= Aloïse Moudileno-Massengo =

French-Congolese politician and lawyer (1933–2020)

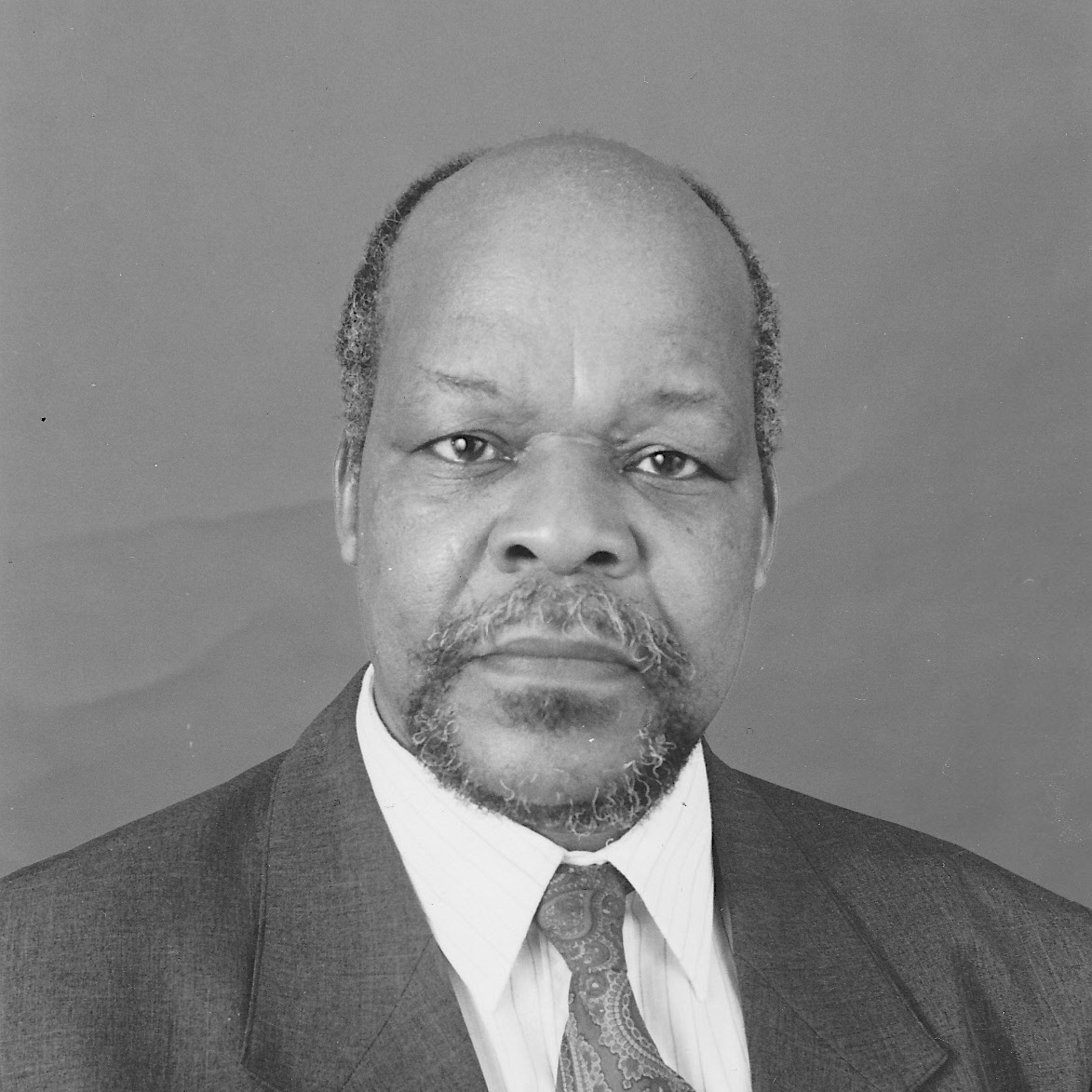

Vice President of the People's Republic of the Congo
- In office December 1971 – August 1972
- President: Marien Ngouabi
- Preceding: Ange Édouard Poungui
- Preceded by: Alfred Raoul

Personal details
- Born: 11 March 1933 Vindza District, People's Republic of the Congo
- Died: 6 January 2020 (aged 86) Nancy, France
- Citizenship: People's Republic of the Congo, France
- Education: Nancy-Université; Ohio University
- Occupation: Lawyer
- Known for: First Congolese lawyer in France

Aloïse Moudileno-Massengo (11 March 1933 – 6 January 2020) was the first Congolese lawyer in France. He later became a minister in the People's Republic of the Congo under Alphonse Massamba-Débat and then Marien Ngouabi, as well as serving as Vice President of the Republic of the Congo.

== Early life ==
Aloïse Moudileno-Massengo was born on 11 March 1933 in the Vindza, N'Ko in the department of the Pool, the second child of a family of the Lari community.

In 1947, he attended the Kindamba primary school and in 1948. After getting his BEPC in 1953, he attended the lycée Augagneur de Pointe-Noire. In 1956, he received his Baccalaureate in Philosophy from the Academy of Bordeaux.

Following his admittance into the higher education system in France, he did his preparatory courses at the Lycée Poincaré of Nancy, where he attended courses in the ENFOM, or École Nationale de la France d'Outre Mer. The passing of the Deferre Policy in 1956 shook up relations between France and its overseas territories, and the last class of student-administrators was accepted in 1956.

In autumn 1957 he enrolled in the Nancy-Université law school. In 1963, he received his law degree.

== Law career ==
On 20 January 1964 The Nancy Bar Association rejected his request to integrate in a decision reached by the Council of the Order because of his citizenship status. Moudileno-Massengo filed and won a suit against the Nancy bar. The decision was reached by the court of appeals and was recorded as precedent on 4 March 1964.

In 1964, Moudileno-Massengo became the first Congolese lawyer participating in a French bar association, as well as the first black member of the Nancy bar, where he would practice until 1966.

Moudileno-Massengo returned to the Congo at the end of 1966. There, on 13 January 1967, Moudileno-Massengo was named defense attorney in the Appeals Court of Brazzaville by a decree of the "Keeper of the Seals" and the Minister of Justice.

He kept ties with the new African elite opposed to neocolonialism. He was the editor in chief of The Congolese Student, the journal of The Federation of Students of Francophone Black Africa. He attended as a lawyer the United Nations Conference on the Rights of Treaties in Vienna, Austria from March to May 1968.

In 1968, he left the Brazzaville bar to politics.

== Politics ==
In August 1968, Moudileno-Massengo was nominated for Keeper of the Seals, Minister of Justice and of Labor, by president Alphonse Massamba-Débat. At the age of 35, along with Ambroise Noumazalaye, Claude-Ernest Ndalla, Justin Lekoudzou and Pierre Nzé, he became part of the young intelligentsia trained in French universities and shaped politically by the anti-colonialist circles of the Association des Étudiants Congolais in France and the FEANF, whose rise within the party in power and the state apparatus contributed to the renewing of the ruling class.

As Minister of Justice, Moudileno-Massengo fought to improve prison conditions and preserve their dignity. In August 1968, he sent all prison wardens rules forbidding practices that would humiliate or debase prisoners. He also attempted to promote rehabilitation through education and began to set up reading spaces throughout prisons.

During a Marxism–Leninism change in government, Moudileno-Massengo became the vice president of the Board of State and vice president of the Republic. During the 1972 Republic of the Congo coup attempt, Moudileno-Massengo was arrested by the leaders of the coup and incarcerated in a Makala prison, but was later released.

Moudileno-Massengo led diplomatic missions throughout Africa, Asia, and Europe. He represented the PCT at the funeral of Ghanaian ex-president Kwame Nkrumah in Conakry in May 1972. His popularity lessened due to Ngouabi concentrating power into his own hands.

== Exile ==
In August 1972, during a mission to East Germany, Moudileno-Massengo resigned his position.

On 12 August 1972 Congolese radio presented him as having "abandoned his duties" and as being "on the run" in a foreign country. His letter of resignation, addressed to Ngouabi on 5 August 1972, revealed the extent of their political differences. His decision was criticized by his political rivals, but also by his mentor, Jacques Opangault, who feared a breakdown of the fragile North-South relationship. Pongui replaced him as vice president and Alexandre Denguet replaced him as Garde des Sceaux and Minister of Labor. In 1976, he organized and led an opposition movement outside the country to the presidency of Joachim Yhombi-Opango. Moudileno-Massengo opposed the presidency Denis Sassou-Nguesso.

In 1985, the United States Department of Commerce recognized the MPC as the principal opposition party in exile. It also emphasized its minimal impact because of Sassou-Nguesso's ability to weaken the opposition and to control the armed forces. He did this by hiring important opposers and his family members into key positions in the government.

== Paperwork ==
In 1990, Moudileno-Massengo published a document named Call to the Nation, which was signed by the principal opposition parties both within the country and in exile. Among the 84 other parties and political associations, he took part in the Sovereign National Conference established in February 1991 in his capacity as leader of the MPC. Moudileno-Massengo was part of the delegation that supported André Milongo.

In April 1992, Moudileno-Massengo was named First Deputy Director General to Elf-Congo at the demand of the Congolese State, one of the company's shareholders. This nomination happened because the recalibration of the Congo and the oil companies that had been demanded by the National Conference. The management of the country's oil was traded in unbalanced arranges.

On 22 January 1993, approximately 15 political parties, including the Mouvement Patriotique Congolais, signed the founding document of the Democratic Centre. Led by Moudileno-Massengo, this party proposed a massive reform of the financing of political parties in order to reduce corruption and stop nepotism. The proposal was rejected by the party in power.

== Death ==
Moudileno-Massengo died on 6 January 2020 in Nancy, France.

== Works ==
- République populaire du Congo : une escroquerie idéologique ou Au cœur du long drame. 1, Les Faits, G. P. Maisonneuve et Larose, 1975.
- Procès de Brazzaville, le réquisitoire, Paris, [5 février 1978], L'Harmattan, 1986.
- Devant un observatoire à Paris : dimanche 18 novembre 2001, éditeur [Nancy] (5 rue Duc-Raoul, 54000), 2001
- Ntoumi : l'alibi, le démenti, le défi, Nancy (5 rue Duc-Raoul, 54000), 2002.
- Le temps du dialogue et de la reconstruction: Congo-Brazzaville, Nancy (5 rue Duc-Raoul, 54000), 2002
