= Republic of the Congo nationality law =

Congolese Nationality Code

Parliament of the Republic of the Congo
- Long title: Code de la nationalité congolaise Loi No. 3561 du 20 juin 1961
- Enacted by: Government of the Republic of the Congo
- Status: Current legislation

Congolese nationality law is a legal statute regulated by the Constitution of the Republic of the Congo. It determine who is, or is eligible to be, a national of the Republic of the Congo. The legal means to acquire nationality, formal legal membership in a nation, differ from the domestic relationship of rights and obligations between a national and the nation, known as citizenship. Congolese nationality is typically obtained under the principle of jus soli, i.e. by birth in the Republic of the Congo, or jus sanguinis, born abroad to parents with Congolese nationality. It can be granted to persons with an affiliation to the country, or to a permanent resident who has lived in the country for a given period of time through naturalization.

== Acquisition of nationality ==
Nationality can be acquired in the Republic of the Congo at birth or later in life through naturalization.

=== By birth ===
Those who acquire nationality at birth include:

- Children born anywhere who have at least one parent who is a Congolese national by birth;
- Children born to foreigners in the Republic of the Congo, who are still residing in the Congo at majority may obtain nationality of origin by request;
- Children born in the country to parents who are stateless; or
- Abandoned children or orphans discovered in the territory whose parents are unknown.

=== By naturalization ===
Naturalization can be granted to persons who have resided in the territory for a sufficient period of time to confirm they understand the customs and traditions of the society. General provisions are that applicants have good character and conduct; have no convictions that resulted in a sentence of one or more years; have good mental and physical health; have sufficient means to sustain themselves economically; and have resided in the country for ten years. There are no provisions in the Nationality Law for children who have been adopted by Congolese parents. (Note: British academic, Bronwyn Manby, states that upon approval an applicant for naturalization must renounce any other nationality. However the amendment to the Nationality Code passed in 2011 and effective as of 20 January 2002, does not require renunciation.) Besides foreigners meeting the criteria, other persons who may be naturalized include:

- The wife of a Congolese national automatically acquires Congolese nationality upon marriage after five years residency;
- Minor children can be automatically naturalized when their parent acquires nationality; or
- Persons who have performed exceptional services to the nation can be naturalized without meeting a residency requirement.

== Loss of nationality ==
Congolese nationals cannot be denaturalized, if they were born in the territory, but can renounce their nationality pending approval by the state. Those who have previously lost their nationality may reacquire it if they are residing in the country, are not under arrest, and were not previously expelled from the country. Nationality may be lost in the Republic of the Congo for failure to perform military obligations; performing actions indicating one is a national of another state; serving in the government or military of another state; committing serious crimes, disloyal acts, or crimes against the state; or for fraud, misrepresentation, or concealment in a naturalization petition.

== Dual nationality ==
Dual nationality is typically allowed in the Republic of the Congo since 2002.

== History ==
=== African kingdoms (1400–1880) ===
In the region, inhabitants were typically arranged in lineage groups, known as kanda. From the early fifteenth century, a political system evolved where in a single person was elected and began representing multiple kanda rather than his own kin to establish cooperation in trade and taxation, so that goods could safely pass among them. Marriage was used to create alliances among various groups and solidify cooperation. As the networks begin kanda grew and power accumulated, weaker groups were absorbed and became subjugated to the ruler. Governors ruled chiefdoms throughout the region extracting tributes, passing a portion on to the main ruler. By the time Diogo Cão, a Portuguese explorer, first established contact with the Kingdom of Kongo in 1483 it was the most powerful kingdom in the region. Portuguese chroniclers noted other lesser kingdoms in the region including the Kakongo, Ngoyo (later Loango), and Vungu Kingdoms to the north of the Congo River; the Tio Kingdom on the coast near present-day Brazzaville; and the Matamba and Ndongo Kingdoms in the south, in what is now Angola. Each of these kingdoms had centralized governments and relied on trade networks with each other for their economic stability.

Initially the Portuguese were interested in mineral resources, but quickly turned to the slave trade. In 1491, they sent a fleet including priests, soldiers and builders, who after making their way to the capital, baptized king Nzinga a Nkuwu, who took the name João, and five of his leading chieftains. João's son Nzinga Mbemba, who took the name Afonso I, was also baptized that year. Afonso became a committed Christian and used Christianity to expand and consolidate his reign when he succeeded his father in 1506. In 1509, Afonso used Portuguese troops to assist in subduing the territories to the north of Nsundi, which included Nsanga and Masinga, two copper producing towns which were aligned with the Tio Kingdom. Throughout his reign Afonso was involved in the slave trade with the Portuguese, who needed the labor for their Brazilian plantations. Upon Afonso's death, the kingdom weakened and saw a succession of short-lived monarchs reign between 1545 and 1568, when Jaga warriors invaded the kingdom.

In the 1620s the Dutch began trading in the region at a time when the economic and political power were shifting from the centralized government to the provinces. Different factions of the kingdom established relationships with varying European powers throughout the early seventeenth century. A succession dispute in 1665, plunged the kingdom into civil war eventually fracturing the kingdom. Though Pedro IV of Kongo was able to restore the unified kingdom in 1715, by proposing that succession shift through various kinship groups, the peace was insecure and war reignited in 1730. By the mid-eighteenth century British and French traders had developed ports in the region and diverted much of the trade to ports under their control. The chiefs of the Kongo became increasingly less important and their authority disintegrated.

Having established themselves on the coast and in the river estuaries, by 1875, the French embarked on a plan to explore the interior of the region. Pierre Savorgnan de Brazza, who had been a student at the French Naval Academy of Borda in Brest, volunteered for the project. Traveling down the Ogooué River, he explored the region for three years making contacts with the local people. In 1880, he began a second exploration with the goal of securing the area for France. After arriving at the confluence of the Ogooué and Mpassa Rivers, he founded Franceville and proceeded down the Lefini River to the Congo River. When he arrived in the lands of the Teke people, de Brazza signed a treaty with their ruler Makoko securing a large tract of land along the right bank of the Stanley Pool in exchange for protection against the British explorer Henry Morton Stanley, who had made enemies in the region.

=== French colonial period (1880–1960) ===
De Brazza was entrusted with opening the area and secured the ratification of the agreement in 1882, which officially established the colony of French Congo. By 1885, the slave trade had been replaced by commerce in dye-making plants, ivory, and rubber. De Brazza was appointed commissioner general of France's possessions of French Congo and Gabon in 1886. In 1891, the two were incorporated into one entity and in 1894 de Brazza granted a large concession to the French trading house of Daumas Béraud and the Societe du Haut Ogooué (Society of Upper Ogooué) in Gabon, granting them a monopoly on trade in exchange for governing the region. De Brazza left the Congo in 1897, but his successors continued using corporate trade concessions to manage affairs in the French possessions licensing forty companies. On 29 December 1903, France issued a decree placing Gabon, Moyen-Congo (Middle Congo, the previous colony of French Congo), the newly established territories of Ubangi-Shari and Chad under French Congo's commissioner general at Brazzaville. Gabon was granted a lieutenant-governor in Libreville to oversee its administration. In 1910, these colonies were federated into French Equatorial Africa.

In 1848, slavery was abolished throughout the French Empire and the Civil Code was extended to all of the French citizens in the colonies. Under the Civil Code, women were legally incapacitated and paternal authority was established over their children. Upon marriage, a woman married to a French man automatically acquired the same nationality as her spouse. Illegitimate children were barred from inheritance and nationality could only be transmitted through a father. Non-citizen nationals were governed by traditional laws concerning marriage and inheritance which placed the well-being of the community above individual rights. These laws prevented a wife from being treated as a slave, required her husband to support her, and entitled her kin to a bride price, to compensate them for the loss of her fertility to their kinship group and secure the legality of the union. Having paid the price for the marriage contract, she and her offspring belonged to the kinship network of her husband and could be inherited if her husband died.

The French Nationality Law of 1889 codified previous statutory laws, changing the French standard from jus sanguinis to jus soli and was extended to the French West Indies. Under its terms, women who would become stateless by the rule to acquire their spouse's nationality were allowed to retain their French nationality upon marriage. The Nationality Law was modified in 1897 when it was extended to the remainder of the French colonies. Clarification in the 1897 decree included that bestowing nationality by birth in French territory only applied to children born in France, restoring descent requirements for the colonies. Under the Code de l'indigénat (Code of Indigenous Status) promulgated for Algeria in 1881 and extended to French Equatorial Africa in 1910, nationals in the new colonies followed customary law. On 23 May 1912, a decree was issued specifically addressing the status of French Equatorial Africans. Under its terms, native persons born in Equatorial Africa were nationals of France but not citizens and were subject to the Indigenous Code. Upon reaching the age of twenty-one, they could be naturalized; however, the law was explicit that neither a wife nor the children of a naturalized Equatorial African automatically derived his French nationality. Only if the spouses were married under French law and the children registered in the Civil Registry could they acquire the status of the husband or father. (Note: Yerri Urban, a public law lecturer at the University of the French Antilles notes that at the time the law went into effect, there were no provisions to allow native Africans to register births in the European Civil Registry.) To naturalize Equatorial Africans had to be able to both read and write French and had to have served in the French military service or have been decorated with the Legion of Honor.

Following the end of World War I France passed a law, "Décret N°. 24 on 25 March 1915 that allowed subjects or protected persons who were non-citizen nationals and had established domicile in a French territory to acquire full citizenship, including the naturalization of their wives and minor children, by having received the cross of the Legion of Honor, having obtained a university degree, having rendered service to the nation, having attained the rank of an officer or received a medal from the French army, who had married a Frenchwoman and established a one-year residency; or who had resided for more than ten years in a colony other than their country of origin. A 14 January 1918 decree written for Equatorial Africa and French West Africa was aimed to provide naturalization for decorated veterans of the war and their families, providing they had not previously been denied their rights nor participated in actions against French rule.

In 1927, France passed a new Nationality Law, which under Article 8, removed the requirement for married women to automatically derive the nationality of a husband and provided that her nationality could only be changed if she consented to change her nationality. It also allowed children born in France to native-born French women married to foreigners to acquire their nationality from their mothers. When it was implemented it included Guadeloupe, Martinique and Réunion but was extended to the remaining French possessions for French citizens only in 1928. Under Article 26 of the 1928 decree was the stipulation that it did not apply to natives of the French possessions except in Algeria, Guadeloupe, Martinique, and Réunion. A decade later, the legal incapacity of married women was finally invalidated for French citizens. In 1939, France determined that marriage and inheritance were too significant to continue being dealt with in native courts. That year, the Mandel Decree was enacted in French West Africa as well as French Equatorial Africa. Under its terms child marriage was discouraged. It established the minimum age at marriage as fourteen for women and sixteen for men, invalidated marriages wherein spouses did not consent, and nullified levirate marriage without approval of the woman.

At the end of World War II, a statute issued on 7 March 1944 granted French citizenship to those who had performed services to the nation, such as serving as civil servants or receiving recognitions. The Constitution of 1946 granted French citizenship to all subjects of France's territories without having to renounce their personal status as natives. Under its terms, Moyen-Congo was classified as an Overseas Territory within the French Union. In 1945, a new Code of French Nationality was passed, which conferred once again automatic French nationality on foreign wives of French men, but allowed mothers who were French nationals to pass their nationality to children born outside of France. It expressly applied to Algeria, French Guiana, Guadeloupe, Martinique and Réunion and was extended to the Overseas Territories in 1953, but in the case of the latter had distinctions for the rights of those who were naturalized.

In 1951 the Jacquinot Decree strengthened the provisions in French West and Equatorial Africa of the Mandel decree removing women who were twenty-one years old, or divorced, from control by a father or guardian and establishing specific rules for the payment and determining the amount of a bride price. In 1958, French Equatorial Africa was dissolved under pressure for autonomy by the African colonies and the French Congo gained self-governance within the French Community. With the passage of the 1958 French Constitution, nationality provisions were standardized for France, Overseas Departments, and Overseas Territories. Article 86 excluded the possibility for independence of the colonies. The French Constitution was amended on 1960 to allow states to maintain membership in the Community even if they were independent republics. In July 1960, negotiations in Paris set terms for independence and a transfer of power.

=== Post-independence (1960–present) ===
Full independence of the Republic of the Congo was granted on 17 August 1960. The first constitution (Loi N° 22–61, 2 March 1961) since independence was approved by referendum in 1961. Under its terms, Congolese nationals were to be defined by law. On 20 June the Nationality Code (Loi N° 35–61) was adopted, establishing the definitions to acquire Congolese nationality. Under its terms a child could derive nationality from either parent, or if the parent was unknown or stateless and they were born within the territory. Wives of Congolese nationals automatically obtained the nationality of their spouse upon marriage and foreigners were allowed to naturalize after a residency period of ten years. There were no provisions for the husband of a Congolese national woman to gain nationality through marriage. A new constitution was promulgated in 1963 to establish a parliamentary government with a presidential style system. In 1968 a coup d'état led to adoption of a socialist constitution and the country was renamed as the People's Republic of the Congo in 1969.

After the dissolution of the Soviet Union in 1991, the country began a transformation to a multi-party democratic republic, restored its former name, and promulgated a new constitution in 1992, based upon the French model. On 30 September 1993, the Nationality Code was amended (Loi N°. 2–93) waiving the residency requirement for the wife and both adult and minor children to acquire nationality when an applicant was naturalized and for foreigners who had performed exceptional services to the nation. The Constitution of 2002 allowed Congolese to acquire dual nationality. On 3 October 2011, the Nationality Code was amended (Loi N°. 32-2011), effective from 20 January 2002, repealing the requirement for applicants being naturalized to renounce other nationality. In 2016 a proposal was under consideration to merge the Nationality Code with the Family Code, but no proposals had been adopted by 2018.
