= Ambroise Noumazalaye =

Prime Minister of the Republic of the Congo (1933–2007)

Ambroise Édouard Noumazalaye (September 23, 1933 – November 17, 2007) was a Congolese politician who was Prime Minister of Congo-Brazzaville from 1966 to 1968, under President Alphonse Massamba-Débat. Later in life he served as Secretary-General of the Congolese Labour Party (PCT) and was a supporter of President Denis Sassou Nguesso. He served as President of the Senate from 2002 to 2007.

== Political career ==
Noumazalaye was born in Brazzaville. At the constitutive congress of the National Movement of the Revolution (MNR) on June 29 – July 2, 1964, he was elected as the party's First Secretary-General. Following the resignation of Prime Minister Pascal Lissouba in April 1966, Noumazalaye was appointed as his successor, at the head of a government approved by the MNR on April 19 and announced on May 6, in which Noumazalaye also served as Minister of Planning. He served as Prime Minister until January 12, 1968, when President Massamba-Débat decided that it was unnecessary to have a Prime Minister and that he would assume the duties of the office himself.

Later in 1968, Noumazalaye was a member of the National Council of the Revolution (CNR) as Secretary in charge of organization, but he was excluded from the CNR in December 1968. He joined the Political Bureau of the ruling PCT when it was expanded from eight to ten members at the party's extraordinary congress held on March 30 – April 1, 1970. At an extraordinary session of the PCT Central Committee held on December 27–31, 1971, he was retained as a member of the Political Bureau, in charge of the Plan, when it was reduced to five members.

Following a failed coup against President Marien Ngouabi on February 22, 1972, Noumazalaye was one of those arrested; he was sentenced to death along with 12 others on March 25, 1972, but Ngouabi commuted the death sentences to life in prison on the same day.

Later, under Sassou Nguesso's presidency, Noumazalaye was elected to the Central Committee of the PCT in 1984 and also became Minister of Industry and Crafts in August 1984. He was elected as Secretary-General of the PCT at its Fourth Extraordinary Congress on December 4–7, 1990. Following the first round of the 1992 presidential election, Noumazalaye, representing the PCT, signed an agreement with Pan-African Union for Social Democracy (UPADS) Secretary-General Christophe Moukouéké and National Alliance for Democracy (AND) National Coordinator Stéphane Maurice Bongho-Nouarra on August 11, 1992. This agreement provided for an alliance between the PCT and UPADS, for the PCT to participate in the second round campaign of UPADS candidate Pascal Lissouba, and for the PCT to receive posts in a future government under Lissouba. However, following Lissouba's victory, the PCT went into opposition after receiving a smaller than expected number of ministerial posts. Under Lissouba's presidency, from 1992 to 1997, Noumazalaye was Secretary-General of the opposition United Democratic Forces (FDU) coalition, which supported Sassou Nguesso.

After Sassou Nguesso returned to power in 1997, Noumazalaye was elected as a Senator from Likouala Region in 2002, and when the Senate opened on August 10, 2002, Noumazalaye was elected as its president. He served in that position until his death five years later. He was re-elected as Secretary-General of the PCT at its Fifth Extraordinary Congress in December 2006, and he also served as Interim President of the FDU coalition around the same time. On April 24, 2007, he signed an agreement on behalf of the PCT with the Congolese Movement for Democracy and Integral Development (MCDDI), led by Bernard Kolélas, in which the two parties formed an alliance for future elections.

Noumazalaye died in November 2007 in Paris. Following his death, an official three-day mourning period was declared for Noumazalaye, beginning on November 22, 2007. His body was returned to Congo on November 23, and it was interred in the Marien Ngouabi Mausoleum on November 24.

== See also ==
- Cold War§Competition in the Third World
- People's Republic of the Congo

Political offices
Preceded by Pascal Lissouba	Prime Minister of Congo-Brazzaville; 1966–1968	Succeeded by Alfred Raoul
