= People's Republic of the Congo =

1969–1992 communist state in Central Africa

Coordinates: 4°16′S 15°17′E

People's Republic of the Congo République populaire du Congo (French)
- 1970–1991
- Flag Emblem
- Motto: "Travail, Démocratie, Paix" (French) "Work, Democracy, Peace"
- Anthem: "Les Trois Glorieuses"
- Capital: Brazzaville
- Common languages: French, Kituba, Lingala
- Religion: State atheism
- Government: Unitary communist state
- Head of State
  - 1969–1977: Marien Ngouabi
  - 1977: Joachim Yhombi-Opango (acting; Military Committee of the Congolese Party of Labour)
  - 1977–1979: Joachim Yhombi-Opango
  - 1979: Jean-Pierre Thystère Tchicaya (acting; Presidium of the Central Committee of the Congolese Party of Labour)
  - 1979–1992: Denis Sassou-Nguesso
- Prime Minister
  - 1973–1975: Henri Lopes (first)
  - 1991–1992: André Milongo (last)
- Historical era: Cold War
  - Trois Glorieuses: 13–15 August 1963
  - Established: 31 December 1970
  - Disestablished: 15 March 1991
- Currency: CFA franc (XAF)
- Calling code: +242
- ISO 3166 code: CG
Preceded by	Succeeded by
Republic of the Congo	Republic of the Congo
- Today part of: Republic of the Congo

The People's Republic of the Congo (French: République populaire du Congo) was a communist state in Central Africa that was established in 1969 following a military coup the previous year, replacing the Republic of the Congo and remaining in place until political reforms in 1992.

The People's Republic of the Congo was founded in December 1969 as the first Marxist–Leninist state in Africa, three months after the government of Alphonse Massamba-Débat was overthrown in the September 1968 coup d'état. The ruling Congolese Party of Labour (French: Parti congolais du travail, PCT) appointed Marien Ngouabi as president, who established the Congo as a one-party communist government aligned with the Soviet Union. Ngouabi was assassinated in 1977 and succeeded by Joachim Yhombi-Opango until he was overthrown in 1979. Denis Sassou Nguesso succeeded Yhombi-Opango, confirmed the PCT's rule in the Congo with a new constitution, formed closer relations with France, and allowed greater foreign investment in the country.

The People's Republic of the Congo transitioned into a multi-party system following the dissolution of the Soviet Union in 1991, restoring the country's earlier name and flag, and ceased to exist by March 1992. André Milongo was appointed as transitional prime minister while Sassou remained as president.

== History ==
=== Background ===
Alphonse Massamba-Débat, who became the president of the Republic of the Congo in 1963, was the first African head of state who proclaimed himself openly a Marxist. He established a single-party system in 1964 around his own political group, the National Movement of the Revolution. Massamba-Débat was elected Secretary General of the National Movement of the Revolution while Ambroise Noumazalaye became its First Secretary. The Congolese single party was backed by a well-armed popular militia, the Défense Civile, headed by Ange Diawara. However, by 1968 mounting protests led Massamba-Débat to imprison one of its leaders, Captain Marien Ngouabi.

=== Proclamation ===
Seeing that the militant leftist opposition was not giving up, Massamba-Débat ended up yielding and proclaimed an amnesty, freeing Marien Ngouabi, among other political prisoners in mid-1968. Following the amnesty Massamba-Débat relinquished his power in September giving way to a period of instability. Finally on 31 December 1968 Marien Ngouabi became the head of state. The new leader officially proclaimed a socialist-oriented state in the form of a "people's republic" on 31 December 1969. The administration became strongly centralized in Brazzaville and the main government posts were taken over by cadres of the Congolese Workers' Party (French: Parti congolais du travail, PCT) after abolishing the national assembly of the previous republic. The Marxist–Leninist PCT held a constitutive congress in the capital from 29 to 31 December 1969, becoming the sole party of the new state. Marien Ngouabi further introduced a number of communist policies—such as nationalizing the means of production—in the succeeding years. Ngouabi was assassinated in 1977 and was succeeded by colonel Joachim Yhombi-Opango, who ruled until February 1979, when Denis Sassou Nguesso rose to power.

In the same manner as other African communist states of the Cold War era, the People's Republic of the Congo shared close ties with the Soviet Union. This association remained strong after Ngouabi's assassination in 1977. However, the PCT government also maintained a close relationship with France throughout its existence.

=== Transition ===
In mid-1991, the Sovereign National Conference removed the word populaire ("people's") from the country's official name, while also replacing the flag and anthem that had been used under the PCT government. The Sovereign National Conference ended the PCT government, appointing a transitional Prime Minister, André Milongo, who was invested with executive powers. Sassou Nguesso was allowed to remain in office in a ceremonial capacity during the transitional period.

== Demographics ==
in 1971, the population was estimated to be "over 900,000" with the majority of the population in southern regions. The People's Republic of the Congo had 2,153,685 inhabitants in 1988. There were 15 ethnic groups, although most people were Kongo, Sangha, Mbochi, or Teke. 8,500 Europeans were present as well, mostly of French extraction. French was the official language, but other recognized languages included Kituba (also known as Monokituba) and Lingala. Most of the population was centered in urban areas, such as Brazzaville. Literacy was 80%, but infant mortality was also high.

== Events and emblems ==
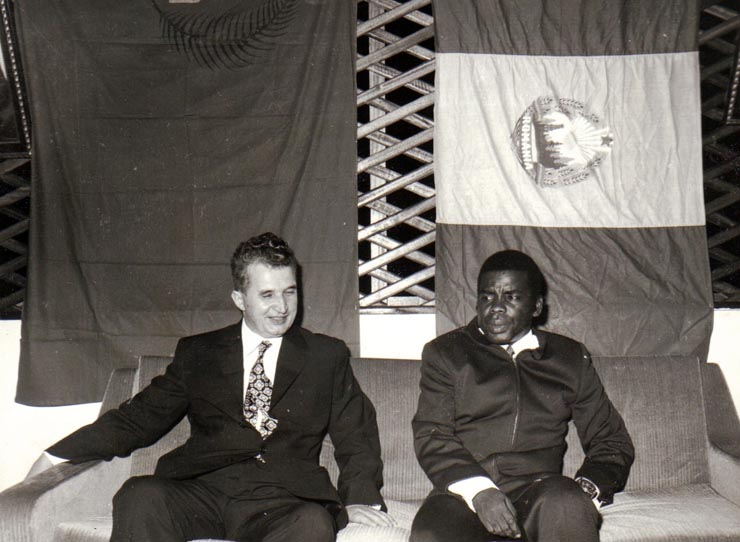
President Marien Ngouabi with Romania's leader Nicolae Ceaușescu (1972)

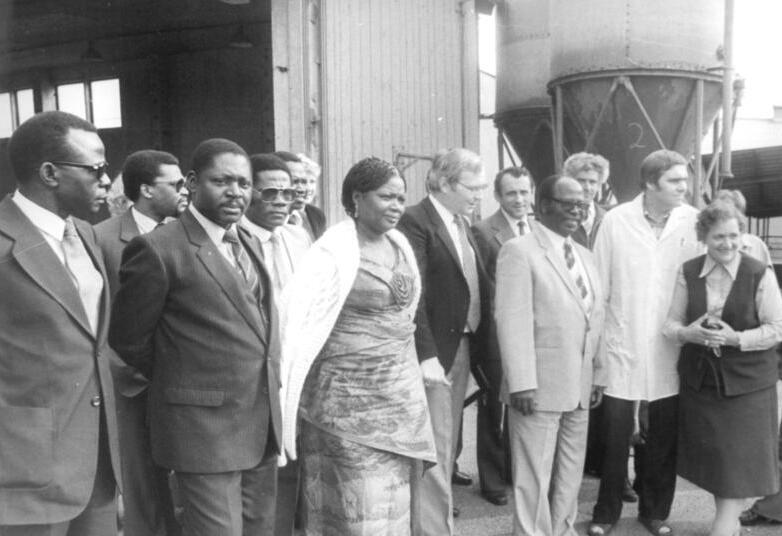
A PR Congo delegation during an official visit to East Germany (1982)

Flag of the PR Congo Army (1970–1992)

Roundel of the PRC Air Force (1970–1992)

== See also ==
- Cold War & Competition in the Third World
