= List of presidents of the Republic of the Congo =

President of the Republic of the Congo
- Président de la République du Congo (French)
- Coat of arms of the Republic of the Congo

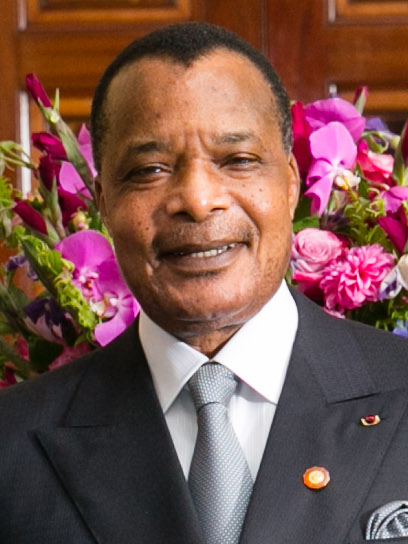
- Incumbent; Denis Sassou Nguesso since 25 October 1997
- Type: Head of state; Formerly head of government (Note: 1960–1963; 1969–1973; 1997–2005; 2009–2016)
- Residence: Presidential Palace, Brazzaville
- Term length: Five years, renewable twice
- Constituting instrument: Constitution of the Republic of the Congo
- Formation: 15 August 1960; 66 years ago
- First holder: Fulbert Youlou
- Salary: US$108,400 annually
- Website: Official Website

This page lists the presidents of the Republic of the Congo (French: Président de la République du Congo), the head of state of Republic of the Congo, since the formation of the post of in 1960, to the present day.

A total of six people have served as President of the Republic of the Congo (not counting one acting/interim head of state and two collective presidencies). Additionally, one person, Denis Sassou Nguesso, has served on two non-consecutive occasions.

== Term limits ==
The new constitution in 2015 removed the age limit, reduced the length of presidential term from seven years to five, and extended term limits from two to three terms.

== List of officeholders ==
Political parties

Democratic Union for the Defense of African Interests (UDDIA)
National Movement of the Revolution (MNR)
Congolese Party of Labour (PCT)
Pan-African Union for Social Democracy (UPADS)

Other affiliations

Military

Status

Denotes Acting/Interim Head of State

=== Republic of the Congo (1960–1969) ===
No.	Portrait	Name (Birth–Death)	Term of office			Political party	Elected	Cabinet(s)	Ref.
No.	Portrait	Name (Birth–Death)	Took office	Left office	Time in office	Political party	Elected	Cabinet(s)	Ref.
1		Fulbert Youlou (1917–1972)	15 August 1960	15 August 1963 (deposed)	3 years	UDDIA	—		
1		Fulbert Youlou (1917–1972)	15 August 1960	15 August 1963 (deposed)	3 years	UDDIA	1961		
2		Alphonse Massamba-Débat (1921–1977) (Note: Styled as Chairman of the National Council of the Revolution until 19 December 1963.)	16 August 1963	4 September 1968 (deposed)	5 years, 19 days	MNR	—	—N/a	
2		Alphonse Massamba-Débat (1921–1977)	16 August 1963	4 September 1968 (deposed)	5 years, 19 days	MNR	1963	—N/a	
–		Alfred Raoul (1938–1999) acting	5 September 1968	1 January 1969	118 days	Military (MNR)	—	—N/a	
3		Marien Ngouabi (1938–1977)	1 January 1969	31 December 1969	364 days	Military / PCT	—	—N/a	

=== People's Republic of the Congo (1969–1992) ===
No.	Portrait	Name (Birth–Death)	Term of office			Political party	Elected	Cabinet(s)	Ref.
No.	Portrait	Name (Birth–Death)	Took office	Left office	Time in office	Political party	Elected	Cabinet(s)	Ref.
(3)		Marien Ngouabi (1938–1977)	31 December 1969	18 March 1977 X	7 years, 77 days	Military / PCT	—	Ngouabi	
(3)		Marien Ngouabi (1938–1977)	31 December 1969	18 March 1977 X	7 years, 77 days	Military / PCT	—	—N/a	
(3)		Marien Ngouabi (1938–1977)	31 December 1969	18 March 1977 X	7 years, 77 days	Military / PCT	1974	—N/a	
–		Military Committee of the PCT; Chairman: Joachim Yhombi-Opango (1939–2020)	18 March 1977	3 April 1977	16 days	Military / PCT	—	—N/a	
4		Joachim Yhombi-Opango (1939–2020)	3 April 1977	5 February 1979 (resigned)	1 year, 308 days	Military / PCT	—	—N/a	
–		Presidium of the Central Committee of the PCT; Chairman: Jean-Pierre Thystère Tchicaya (1936–2008)	5 February 1979	8 February 1979	3 days	PCT	—	—N/a	
5		Denis Sassou Nguesso (born 1943)	8 February 1979	15 March 1992	13 years, 36 days	Military / PCT	1979	—N/a	
5		Denis Sassou Nguesso (born 1943)	8 February 1979	15 March 1992	13 years, 36 days	Military / PCT	1984	—N/a	
5		Denis Sassou Nguesso (born 1943)	8 February 1979	15 March 1992	13 years, 36 days	Military / PCT	1989	—N/a	

=== Republic of the Congo (1992–present) ===
No.	Portrait	Name (Birth–Death)	Term of office			Political party	Elected	Cabinet(s)	Ref.
No.	Portrait	Name (Birth–Death)	Took office	Left office	Time in office	Political party	Elected	Cabinet(s)	Ref.
(5)		Denis Sassou Nguesso (born 1943)	15 March 1992	31 August 1992	169 days	PCT	—	—N/a	
6		Pascal Lissouba (1931–2020)	31 August 1992	25 October 1997 (deposed)	5 years, 55 days	UPADS	1992	—N/a	
(5)		Denis Sassou Nguesso (born 1943)	25 October 1997	Incumbent	29 years, 21 days	PCT	—	National Unity	
(5)		Denis Sassou Nguesso (born 1943)	25 October 1997	Incumbent	29 years, 21 days	PCT	2002	Sassou I	
(5)		Denis Sassou Nguesso (born 1943)	25 October 1997	Incumbent	29 years, 21 days	PCT	—	—N/a	
(5)		Denis Sassou Nguesso (born 1943)	25 October 1997	Incumbent	29 years, 21 days	PCT	2009	Sassou II	
(5)		Denis Sassou Nguesso (born 1943)	25 October 1997	Incumbent	29 years, 21 days	PCT	—	Sassou III	
(5)		Denis Sassou Nguesso (born 1943)	25 October 1997	Incumbent	29 years, 21 days	PCT	—	Sassou IV	
(5)		Denis Sassou Nguesso (born 1943)	25 October 1997	Incumbent	29 years, 21 days	PCT	2016	—N/a	
(5)		Denis Sassou Nguesso (born 1943)	25 October 1997	Incumbent	29 years, 21 days	PCT	2021	—N/a	
(5)		Denis Sassou Nguesso (born 1943)	25 October 1997	Incumbent	29 years, 21 days	PCT	2026	—N/a	

== Latest election ==
Candidate	Party	Votes	%
Denis Sassou Nguesso	Congolese Party of Labour	2,509,456	94.90
Mavoungou Zinga Mabio	Alliance for Democratic Alternation in 2026	37,141	1.40
Uphrem Dave Mafoula	Independent	27,254	1.03
Destin Gavet	Republican Movement	23,060	0.87
Joseph Kignoumbi Kia Mboungou	La Chaine	22,744	0.86
Vivien Romain Manangou	Independent	15,994	0.60
Nganguia Engambé Anguios	Party for the Action of the Republic	8,694	0.33
Total		2,644,343	100.00
Valid votes		2,644,343	98.60
Invalid/blank votes		37,578	1.40
Total votes		2,681,921	100.00
Registered voters/turnout		3,155,751	84.99
Source: Constitutional Court

== See also ==
- Politics of the Republic of the Congo
- List of prime ministers of the Republic of the Congo
- Vice President of the Republic of the Congo
