= Henri Lopes =

Congolese writer, diplomat, and politician (1937–2023)

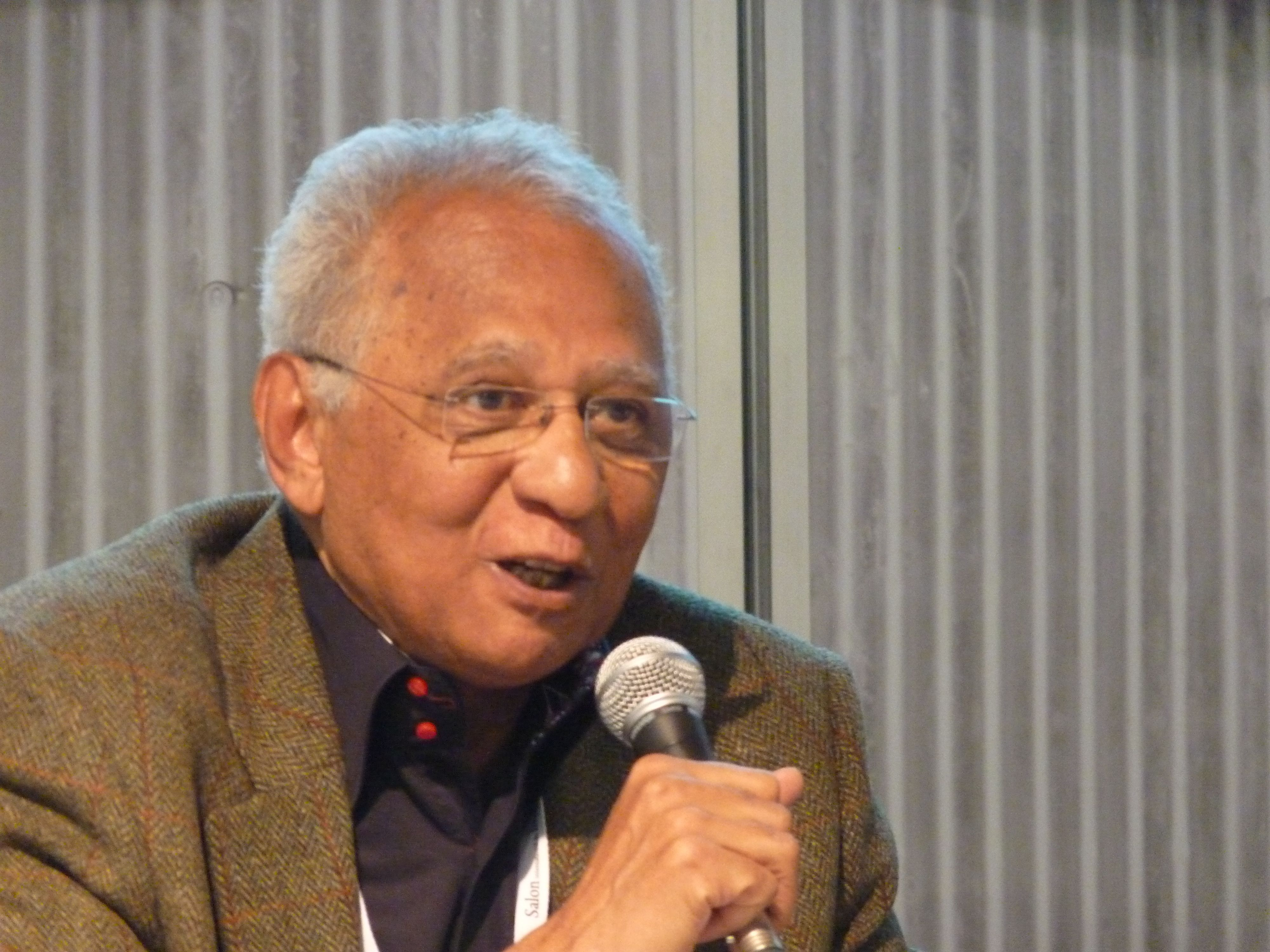
- Lopes in 2012

Prime Minister of the People's Republic of the Congo
- In office 28 July 1973 – 18 December 1975
- President: Marien Ngouabi
- Preceded by: Alfred Raoul
- Succeeded by: Louis Sylvain Goma

Ambassador of the Republic of the Congo to France
- In office 26 October 1998 – 12 July 2016
- President: Denis Sassou-Nguesso
- Succeeded by: Rodolphe Adada

Personal details
- Born: 12 September 1937 Léopoldville, Belgian Congo (now Kinshasa, Democratic Republic of the Congo)
- Died: 2 November 2023 (aged 86) Suresnes, France
- Party: Congolese Party of Labour
- Education: Sorbonne

Henri Lopes (12 September 1937 – 2 November 2023) was a Congolese writer, diplomat, and politician. He was Prime Minister of Congo-Brazzaville from 1973 to 1975, and served as Congo-Brazzaville's Ambassador to France from 1998 to 2016.

== Early life and education ==
Lopes was born across the Congo River in Léopoldville (now Kinshasa), the capital of the Belgian Congo (now the Democratic Republic of the Congo), on 12 September 1937. He received his primary education in Brazzaville and Bangui in Central African Republic, then went to France in 1949 for his secondary and higher education. While there, he was a member of the Executive Committee of the Federation of Black African Students and was President of the Association of Congolese Students from 1957 to 1965. Returning to Congo in 1965, he was a history professor at the École normale supérieure d'Afrique Centrale in Brazzaville from 1965 to 1966, then Director-General of Education from 1966 to 1968.

== Political and diplomatic career ==
Under President Marien Ngouabi, Lopes became Minister of National Education in January 1969 until becoming Minister of Foreign Affairs in December 1971. He was included on the five-member Political Bureau of the Congolese Labour Party (PCT) in December 1972. Subsequently, he was Prime Minister from 1973 to 1975. He visited China in early 1975, but could not meet with Chairman Mao Zedong because Mao was ill. Lopes and his government resigned following a meeting of the PCT Central Committee in December 1975, and Louis Sylvain Goma was appointed to replace him.

After working as political director of the party newspaper Etumba from 1975 to 1977, Lopes was reappointed to the government as minister of finance on 5 April 1977; he served in that position until Justin Lekoundzou was appointed to replace him in December 1980. Subsequently, he worked at UNESCO as Assistant Director-General for Culture and Deputy Director-General for Africa from 1981 to 1998.

On 26 October 1998, Lopes presented his credentials as Congo-Brazzaville's Ambassador to France; while posted in Paris, he was additionally accredited as Ambassador to the United Kingdom, Portugal, Spain, and the Vatican City.

In 2002, Lopes was a candidate for the post of Secretary-General of the international organization La Francophonie, but he withdrew his candidacy under pressure on the night before the vote, which was held on 20 October 2002 and resulted in the unanimous election of Senegal's Abdou Diouf.

In mid-2015, it was reported that Lopes planned to retire from his post as Ambassador to France, which he did later that year.

== As a writer ==
In addition to his political and diplomatic career, Lopes was an author. His most recognised work is the satirical novel Le Pleurer-rire ("The Laughing Cry", 1982). Other works include the short-story collection Tribaliques ("Tribaliks," 1971), as well as the novels La Nouvelle romance (1975) and Sans tam-tam (1977). His last novel, Le Méridional (2015), was praised as "a fine portrayal of the life of an African long residing in France, narrated by a writer whose life bears some resemblances to Lopes's own".

Tribaliques received the Grand prix littéraire d'Afrique noire in 1972, and in 1993 Lopes received the Grand prix de la francophonie of the Académie française for his entire body of work.

In November 2015, he delivered the keynote address at the 22nd International African Writers' Day Conference, organized by the Pan African Writers' Association (PAWA) on the theme "Celebrating the life and works of Chinua Achebe; the coming of age of African Literature?", in Accra, Ghana. During the conference Lopes received the award of Honorary Membership of PAWA, alongside other honorees who included the late Kwame Nkrumah, Emeritus Professor Ekwueme Michael Thelwell, Dr Margaret Busby, James Currey, Professor Jophus Anamuah-Mensah, Dr Joyce Rosalind Aryee and others.

Lopes also wrote the words to "Les Trois Glorieuses", which served as the national anthem of the People's Republic of the Congo from 1970 to 1991.

Mr. Lopes published his memoir in 2018, “Il est déjà demain” (“It is Already Tomorrow”).

== Death ==
Henri Lopes died in Suresnes, France, on 2 November 2023, at the age of 86.

== Selected bibliography ==
- Il est déjà demain (Paris: JC Lattès, 2018, ISBN 9782709660624)
- Le Méridional (Éditions Gallimard, 2015, ISBN 978-2070148271)
- Une enfant de Poto-Poto (Éditions Gallimard, 2012, ISBN 978-2070136087)
- Ma grand-mère bantoue et mes ancêtres les Gaulois. Simples discours (Paris: Éditions Gallimard, ISBN 978-2070715879)
- Le Lys et le Flamboyant (Paris: Seuil, 1997, ISBN 978-2020200967)
- Le chercheur d’Afriques (Paris: Seuil, 1990, ISBN 978-2020849609)
- Le Pleurer-rire (Présence Africaine, 1982, ISBN 978-2708704046)
  Translated into English by G. Moore as The Laughing Cry: An African Cock and Bull Story (Readers International, 1987, ISBN 978-0930523336)
- Sans tam-tam (Éditions CLE, 1977, ISBN 978-2723500135)
- La Nouvelle romance (Yaoundé: CLE, 1975, ISBN 978-2723604727)
- Tribaliques (Yaoundé: CLE, 1971, ISBN 9782266012850)
  Translated into English as Tribaliks: Contemporary Congolese Stories (Heinemann African Writers Series, 1987, ISBN 978-0435907624)

== Selected awards ==
- 1972: Grand prix littéraire d'Afrique noire for Tribaliques
- 1992: Grand prix de la francophonie
- 2002: Honorary doctorates from University of Paris XII and the Université Laval
- 2013: Honorary doctorate from University of Sonfoniah, Guinea
- 2015: Officer of the Légion d'Honneur

Political offices
Vacant Title last held by Alfred Raoul	Prime Minister of Congo-Brazzaville; 1973–75	Succeeded by Louis Sylvain Goma
