= List of prime ministers of the Republic of the Congo =

Prime Minister of the Republic of the Congo
- Premier Ministre de la République du Congo (French)
- Coat of arms of the Republic of the Congo

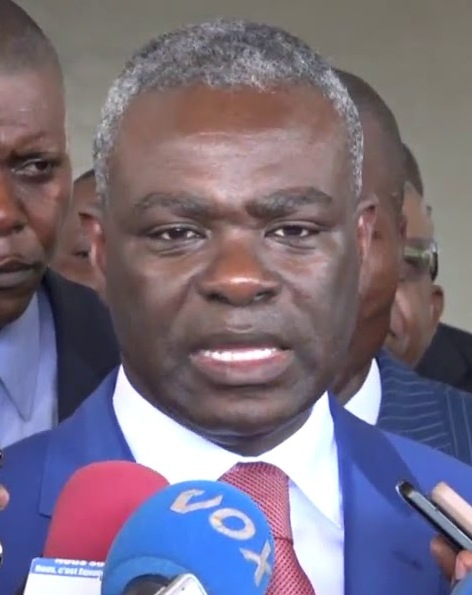
- Incumbent; Anatole Collinet Makosso since 12 May 2021
- Type: Head of government
- Appointer: President of the Republic of the Congo
- Formation: 16 August 1963; 63 years ago
- First holder: Alphonse Massamba-Débat

This page lists the prime ministers of the Republic of the Congo (French: Premier Ministre de la République du Congo), the head of government of Republic of the Congo, since the formation of the post in 1963, to the present day.

A total of seventeen people have served as Prime Minister of the Republic of the Congo (not counting one acting prime minister). Additionally, one person, Louis Sylvain Goma, has served on two non-consecutive occasions.

The incumbent prime minister is Anatole Collinet Makosso, since 12 May 2021.

== List of officeholders ==
Political parties

National Movement of the Revolution (MNR)
Congolese Party of Labour (PCT)
Pan-African Union for Social Democracy (UPADS)
Rally for Democracy and Development (RDD)
Union of Democratic Forces (UFD)
Congolese Movement for Democracy and Integral Development (MCDDI)

Other affiliations

Military
Independent

Status

Denotes Acting Prime Minister

=== Republic of the Congo (1963–1969) ===
No.	Portrait	Name (Birth–Death)	Term of office			Political party	Elected	Cabinet(s)	Ref.
No.	Portrait	Name (Birth–Death)	Took office	Left office	Time in office	Political party	Elected	Cabinet(s)	Ref.
1		Alphonse Massamba-Débat (1921–1977)	16 August 1963	19 December 1963	125 days	MNR	—		
1		Alphonse Massamba-Débat (1921–1977)	16 August 1963	19 December 1963	125 days	MNR	1963		
2		Pascal Lissouba (1931–2020)	24 December 1963	15 April 1966	2 years, 112 days	MNR	—		
3		Ambroise Noumazalaye (1933–2007)	6 May 1966	12 January 1968	1 year, 251 days	MNR	—		
4		Alfred Raoul (1930–1999)	4 August 1968	30 December 1969	1 year, 148 days	Military	—		
Post abolished (31 December 1969 – 28 July 1973)

=== People's Republic of the Congo (1973–1992) ===
No.	Portrait	Name (Birth–Death)	Term of office			Political party	Elected	Cabinet(s)	Ref.
No.	Portrait	Name (Birth–Death)	Took office	Left office	Time in office	Political party	Elected	Cabinet(s)	Ref.
5		Henri Lopes (1937–2023)	28 July 1973	18 December 1975	2 years, 143 days	PCT	—		
6		Louis Sylvain Goma (born 1941)	18 December 1975	7 August 1984	8 years, 233 days	PCT	—		
6		Louis Sylvain Goma (born 1941)	18 December 1975	7 August 1984	8 years, 233 days	PCT	1979		
7		Ange Édouard Poungui (1942–2026)	7 August 1984	7 August 1989	5 years	PCT	1984		
8		Alphonse Poaty-Souchlaty (1941–2024)	7 August 1989	3 December 1990	1 year, 118 days	PCT	1989		
–		Pierre Moussa (born 1941) acting	3 December 1990	8 January 1991	36 days	PCT	—		
(6)		Louis Sylvain Goma (born 1941)	8 January 1991	8 June 1991	151 days	PCT	—		
9		André Milongo (1935–2007)	8 June 1991	15 March 1992	281 days	Independent	—		

=== Republic of the Congo (1992–present) ===
No.	Portrait	Name (Birth–Death)	Term of office			Political party	Elected	Cabinet(s)	Ref.
No.	Portrait	Name (Birth–Death)	Took office	Left office	Time in office	Political party	Elected	Cabinet(s)	Ref.
(9)		André Milongo (1935–2007)	15 March 1992	2 September 1992	171 days	Independent	1992		
10		Stéphane Maurice Bongho-Nouarra (1937–2007)	2 September 1992	6 December 1992	95 days	UPADS	—		
11		Claude Antoine Dacosta (1932–2007)	6 December 1992	23 June 1993	199 days	Independent	—		
11		Claude Antoine Dacosta (1932–2007)	6 December 1992	23 June 1993	199 days	Independent	1993		
12		Joachim Yhombi-Opango (1939–2020)	23 June 1993	27 August 1996	3 years, 65 days	RDD	—		
13		Charles David Ganao (1926–2012)	27 August 1996	8 September 1997	1 year, 12 days	UFD	—	Ganao	
14		Bernard Kolélas (1933–2009)	8 September 1997	15 October 1997 (deposed)	37 days	MCDDI	—	Kolélas	
Post abolished (15 October 1997 – 7 January 2005)
15		Isidore Mvouba (born 1954)	7 January 2005	15 September 2009	4 years, 251 days	PCT	—	Mouamba I	
15		Isidore Mvouba (born 1954)	7 January 2005	15 September 2009	4 years, 251 days	PCT	—	Mouamba II	
15		Isidore Mvouba (born 1954)	7 January 2005	15 September 2009	4 years, 251 days	PCT	2007	Mouamba III	
Post abolished (15 September 2009 – 23 April 2016)
16		Clément Mouamba (1943–2021)	23 April 2016	12 May 2021	5 years, 20 days	PCT	—	Mouamba I	
16		Clément Mouamba (1943–2021)	23 April 2016	12 May 2021	5 years, 20 days	PCT	2017	Mouamba II	
17		Anatole Collinet Makosso (born 1965)	12 May 2021	Incumbent	5 years, 187 days	PCT	—	Makosso I	
17		Anatole Collinet Makosso (born 1965)	12 May 2021	Incumbent	5 years, 187 days	PCT	2022	Makosso I	
17		Anatole Collinet Makosso (born 1965)	12 May 2021	Incumbent	5 years, 187 days	PCT	—	Makosso II	

== See also ==
- Politics of the Republic of the Congo
- List of presidents of the Republic of the Congo
- Vice President of the Republic of the Congo
