= Barthélemy Kikadidi =

Congolese military officer and assassin

Barthélemy Kikadidi (1944 – 13 February 1978) was a Congolese military officer who was responsible for the assassination of Marxist president Marien Ngouabi.

A Kongo man, he previously served as a captain, but ended his service prior to assassinating Ngouabi. Backed by Alphonse Massamba-Débat, he impersonated as a fabricated military officer who had recently returned from Europe, and led multiple men to attack Ngouabi, on 18 March 1977; all of this was accused, but never proven. Following this, Congolese government officials closed the borders and asked the people to find him, giving him a death sentence in a trial in absentia. Kikadidi hid with the help of taximan Joseph Kifouani, who drove him to a hideout near Brazzaville. He was killed by police on 13 February 1978.
