= Alfred Raoul =

President of Congo-Brazzaville from 1968 to 1969

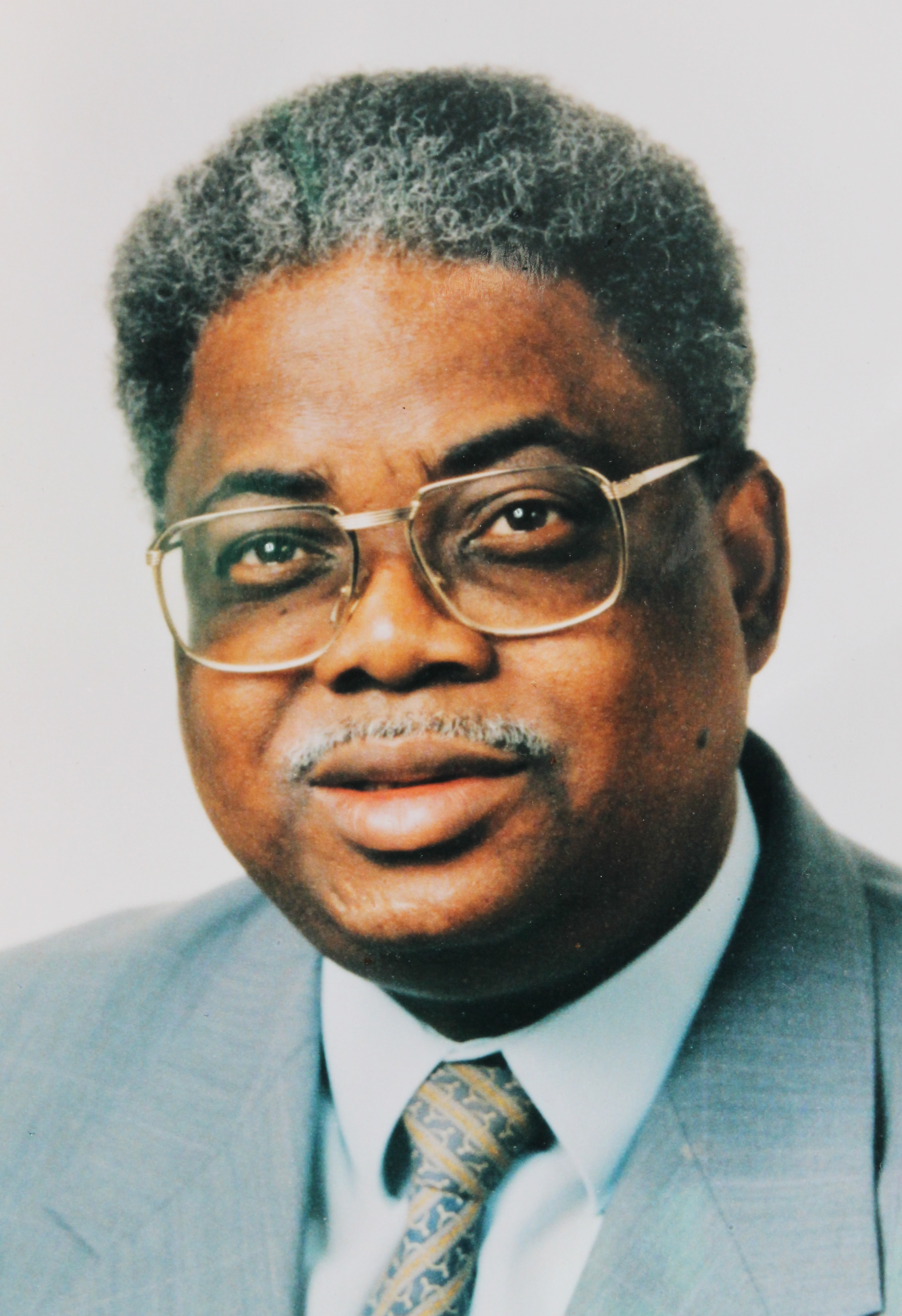

President of the Republic of the Congo
- In office 5 September 1968 – 1 January 1969
- Preceded by: Alphonse Massamba-Débat
- Succeeded by: Marien Ngouabi

Vice President of the Republic of the Congo
- In office January 1970 – December 1971
- Succeeded by: Aloïse Moudileno-Massengo

Prime Minister of the Republic of the Congo
- In office 4 August 1968 – 30 December 1969
- Preceded by: Ambroise Noumazalaye
- Succeeded by: Henri Lopes

Personal details
- Born: 15 December 1938 Pointe-Noire, French Equatorial Africa
- Died: 16 July 1999 (aged 60) Paris, France
- Resting place: Pointe-Noire
- Spouse: Emilienne Raoul
- Children: 2

Military service
- Rank: General Corps (Congo)

Alfred Raoul (15 December 1938 – 16 July 1999) was President of the Republic of the Congo from 5 September 1968 to 1 January 1969, and the Prime Minister of the Republic of the Congo from August 1968 to December 1969.

He was Vice President of the People's Republic of Congo from January 1970 to December 1971.

He was married to Émilienne Raoul.

== Military career ==
He did his secondary studies at the Victor-Augagneur high school in Pointe-Noire, and left the Congo in 1959 to join the army.

Political offices
Preceded by Ambroise Noumazalaye	Prime Minister of Congo-Brazzaville; 1968–1969	Succeeded by Position abolished
Preceded by Alphonse Massamba-Débat	President of the Republic of the Congo; 1968–1969	Succeeded by Marien Ngouabi
