= 1963 Republic of the Congo parliamentary election =

Parliamentary elections were held in the Republic of the Congo on 11 December 1963. They followed a constitutional referendum on 8 December, which approved a constitution that made the country a one-party state. Although it did not come into force until July 1964, the National Movement of the Revolution was the sole party to contest the election, and won all seats. Voter turnout was 91.7%.

== Results ==
Party	Votes	%	Seats
National Movement of the Revolution	439,635	100.00	55
Total	439,635	100.00	55
Valid votes	439,635	88.94	
Invalid/blank votes	54,644	11.06	
Total votes	494,279	100.00	
Registered voters/turnout	539,219	91.67	
Source: Nohlen et al.
