= Coat of arms of the Congo =

Coat of arms of the Congo may refer to:

- Coat of arms of the Republic of the Congo, a shield with a red lion holding a torch
- Coat of arms of the Democratic Republic of the Congo
