= Pierre Anga =

Congolese army officer and rebel leader (1940–1988)

Pierre Anga (1940 – 6 September (or 7 July) 1988) was a Congolese military officer and rebel leader. He was an opposition figure to Congolese President Denis Sassou Nguesso—a nephew.

== Biography ==
Born 1940, and from Owando, Anga was ranked lieutenant. He formed part of the Military Committee of the Congolese Party of Labour which for the period between 18 March 1977, to 3 April 1977, acted in place of the Presidency after Marien Ngouabi—a nephew—was assassinated. During their rule, Anga demanded a high-ranking position, which caused him to be removed from the Committee. In a 1977 or 1978 document, he accused Nguesso of wanting to overthrow Ngouabi, and that he assassinated him, as well as cardinal Émile Biayenda. To avoid persecution, he and his family armed themselves and hid at Mange—a settlement 30 kilometers from Owando. Nguesso ordered his search, and paratroopers were deployed near his area. Anga, a member of the M 22 movement, disagreed with Nguesso's politics. He was arrested in 1979, but later released due to coersion of his family.

While on house arrest in Ikongono, 25 kilometers from Owando, he escaped and recruits a group of around thirty people to fight alongside him. Congolese security forces destroyed his house, but Anga escaped via tunnel. On 6 September 1987, a group of three to six soldiers were sent to arrest Anga for his involvement in the 1987 Republic of the Congo coup attempt, all of whom were murdered. Anga himself was also murdered on 6 September, at age 47 or 48, when more soldiers reached him. Official reports state he died on 7 July.

== See also ==
- List of people assassinated in Africa
- List of heads of state of the Republic of the Congo
