= 1966 Republic of the Congo coup attempt =

1966 Republic of the Congo coup d'état attempt
Date	June 27 - July 6, 1966
Location	Republic of the Congo
Result	Coup fails: Alphonse Massamba-Débat returns from Madagascar and remains in power

Belligerents
Government of the Republic of the Congo (Cuba) Cuban military mission	Army faction

For ten days in June and July 1966, an attempted coup took place in the Republic of the Congo. The coup was sparked following the demotion of Marien Ngouabi (the future President) who was accused of insubordination. Ngouabi's elite unit of paratroopers took over part of the capital, Brazzaville and were successful at cutting of the city's telecommunications and transportation.

A group of over 200 Cuban army troops, then resident in Brazzaville, protected the government's radio station as well as the Congolese government against the rebelling paratroopers. When President Alphonse Massamba-Débat returned to the country on 3 July he was greeted at the airport by members of his government and not by the military, which was customary.

Soviet, American, West German, Belgian, and French diplomats who were present all agreed that the Cuban army's presence in the capital had prevented the overthrow of the regime.
