= National Movement of the Revolution =

National Movement of the Revolution Mouvement national de la révolution
- First Secretary: Ambroise Noumazalaye
- Founder: Alphonse Massamba-Débat
- Founded: 29 June 1964 (61 years, 46 days)
- Dissolved: 29 December 1969 (55 years, 228 days)
- Split from: Democratic Union for the Defense of African Interests
- Succeeded by: Congolese Party of Labour
- Newspaper: Etumba
- Youth wing: Youth of the National Movement of the Revolution
- Ideology: Scientific socialism
- Political position: Left-wing

The National Movement of the Revolution (French: Mouvement national de la révolution, abbreviated MNR) was a political party in the Republic of the Congo. MNR was founded at a congress held June 29 to July 6, 1964. MNR was instituted as the sole legal political party in the country on July 20, 1964, according to the Law No. 25-65. Pre-existing political parties were ordered to fuse into the MNR. MNR adopted scientific socialism as its ideological foundation. Ambroise Noumazalaye was the First Secretary of the party.

MNR was a mass party. It had two central leading organs, a Central Committee and a Political Bureau. The Political Bureau executed the decisions of the Central Committee. It also gave the President approval regarding the appointment of ministers in the government of the Republic. The leftwing faction of party was based in the northern areas of the country. MNR published the journal Etumba.

In August 1964, a founding congress of the Youth of the National Movement of the Revolution (JMNR) was held. JMNR soon went beyond the control of the party, and on June 20, 1965 a new paramilitary structure National Civilian Defense Corps (Defense civile) was formed. The Defense civile was put under the direct control of the MNR.

In the summer of 1966 MNR moved to politicize the armed forces. A law was passed on June 22, 1966, which transformed the Congolese Armed Forces into the National People's Army (APN). A High Command of the APN was formed jointly by the government and the MNR. The High Command was led by a political commission, consisting of civilians and led by an officer party member. The lieutenant Marien Ngouabi, later the president of the country, became the APN representative in the MNR Central Committee.

In the same year 1966 a political dispute erupted between the President Alphonse Massamba-Débat and the leftwing of the MNR. As a result, in the summer of 1967 a Permanent Commission of the MNR was formed. The task of the Permanent Commission was to control the day-to-day work of the government.

In December 1969 MNR was substituted by a new party, the Congolese Party of Labour (PCT). PCT based itself on the MNR charter from 1966, but unlike MNR, PCT was a vanguard party.

== Electoral history ==
=== Presidential elections ===
Election	Party candidate	Votes	%	Result
1963	Alphonse Massamba-Débat	1,078	100%	Elected ✓

=== National Assembly elections ===
Election	Party leader	Votes	%	Seats	+/–	Position	Result
1963	Alphonse Massamba-Débat	439,635	100%	55 / 55	▲55	▲1st	Sole legal party

== See also ==
- Cold War in the Third World
- People's Republic of the Congo
