= 1963 Republic of the Congo presidential election =

Indirect presidential elections were held in the Republic of the Congo on 19 December 1963 after President Fulbert Youlou had been overthrown in the Trois Glorieuses uprising on 15 August. Alphonse Massamba-Débat was the only candidate, and was elected unopposed.

== Results ==
Candidate	Party	Votes	%
Alphonse Massamba-Débat	National Movement of the Revolution	1,078	100.00
Total		1,078	100.00
Valid votes		1,078	99.81
Invalid/blank votes		2	0.19
Total votes		1,080	100.00
Registered voters/turnout		1,089	99.17
Source: Sternberger et al.
