= Constitution of the Republic of the Congo =

Basic law governing the Republic of the Congo

The Constitution of the Republic of the Congo is the basic law governing the Republic of the Congo. In it, it is stated that the Republic of the Congo is a pluralistic, multi-party democracy. A presidential system since 2009, the president's term was originally 7 years, which has now been reduced to five after a 2015 constitutional referendum that instituted a new Constitution, which also reinstated the position of Prime Minister and moved the country to a semi-presidential system. The Council of Ministers – the government – is appointed by the President.

The country's parliament is bicameral, made up of a National Assembly and a Senate.

The chief court is the Supreme Court. In addition, Congo has a Constitutional Court which rules on constitutional matters.

Congo is divided into 12 départements (counties or regions), each of which has its own local council.

The old and new constitutions both reference several important texts with reference to basic human rights:

- The UN Charter
- The Universal Declaration of Human Rights
- The African Charter on Human and People's Rights
- The 1991 Congolese Charter of National Unity and the Charter of Rights and Freedoms

Congo is a decentralised, secular and democratic republic.

== The 2015 referendum ==
A constitutional referendum was held on 25 October 2015 on a proposal to change the constitution. The new constitution included the following changes:

- Abolishing the death penalty.
- Extending the right to run for president to three terms, while simultaneously reducing the presidential term from seven to five years.
- Eliminating the maximum age limit of 70 years for the presidency, and reducing the minimum age from 40 to 30 years.
- Reinstating the position of Prime Minister, abolished in 2009.
- Reforming the Constitutional Court. Previously entirely nominated by the president, its nine members are now nominated by the chairs of the National Assembly and Senate, the Chief Justice of the Supreme Court, and the President, for four-year terms renewable twice.
- Creates a number of consultative bodies (these are in addition to existing bodies including the Economic, Social and Environmental Council; the Mediator of the Republic; the National Committee for Human Rights; and the Superior Council for Freedom of Communication). They are able to call government officials to testify on issues relevant to their purview:
  1. The National Council for Dialogue
  2. The Consultative Council for Women
  3. The Consultative Council for People Living with Handicaps
  4. The Consultative Council for Youth
  5. The Consultative Council for Traditions and Religions
  6. The Consultative Council for NGOs and Civil Society
- Giving greater powers to local authorities and affirming that Congo is a “decentralised state”.
