= 1963 Republic of the Congo constitutional referendum =

- 8 December 1963

Results
Choice	Votes	%
Yes	419,893	86.09%
No	67,825	13.91%
Valid votes	487,718	98.67%
Invalid or blank votes	6,561	1.33%
Total votes	494,279	100.00%
Registered voters/turnout	539,219	91.67%

A constitutional referendum was held in the Republic of the Congo on 8 December 1963. The new constitution created a one-party state and set the presidential term limit at two terms. It was approved by 86% of voters, with a 91.7% turnout.

== Results ==
Choice	Votes	%
For	419,893	86.1
Against	67,825	13.9
Invalid/blank votes	6,561	–
Total	494,279	100
Registered voters/turnout	539,219	91.7
Source: African Elections Database
