= Raymond Damase Ngollo =

Congolese general and politician

Raymond Damase Ngollo (25 March 1936, in Ngabe – 9 August 2017) was a Congolese General. He was a member of the Military Committee of the Congolese Labour Party which briefly ruled the Republic of Congo between 18 March 1977 and 3 April 1977. Ngollo was a Minister of Defence and founded the Rally for Democracy and Republic (RDR).
