= Military Committee of the Congolese Party of Labour =

The Military Committee of the Congolese Party of Labour (French: Comité Militaire du Parti Congolais du Travail) was a military Committee which briefly ruled the People's Republic of the Congo between 18 March 1977 and 3 April 1977.

== Membership in 1977 ==
- Col. Joachim Yhombi-Opango, Head of State
- Maj. Denis Sassou Nguesso, Defense Minister
- Maj. Louis Sylvain Goma, Prime Minister
- Maj. Raymond Damase Ngollo
- Maj. Pascal Bima
- Maj. Jean-Michel Ebaka
- Maj. Martin M'Bia
- Capt. François-Xavier Katali, Interior Minister
- Capt. Nicholas Ockongo
- Capt. Florent Ntsiba
- Lt. Pierre Anga

== See also ==
- List of heads of state of the Republic of the Congo
