= 1968 Republic of the Congo coup d'état =

Overthrown of Alphonse Massamba-Débat

Date	September 4, 1968
Location	Republic of the Congo
Result	Coup succeeds: Alphonse Massamba-Débat arrested

Belligerents
Government of the Republic of the Congo	Army faction Prime Minister Alfred Raoul

On September 4, 1968, following several days of violent clashes, Alphonse Massamba-Débat's government was overthrown by the military who forced Massamba-Débat to resign. Alfred Raoul then became the acting head of state until January 1969 when Marien Ngouabi, the chairman of the same party that had brought Massamba-Débat to power, assumed control.
