= Joachim Yhombi-Opango =

Congolese politician (1939–2020)

Prime Minister of the Republic of the Congo
- In office 23 June 1993 – 27 August 1996
- President: Pascal Lissouba
- Preceded by: Claude Antoine Dacosta
- Succeeded by: Charles David Ganao

4th President of the People's Republic of the Congo
- In office 4 April 1977 – 5 February 1979
- Vice President: Denis Sassou-Nguesso; Louis-Sylvain Goma
- Preceded by: Marien Ngouabi
- Succeeded by: Jean-Pierre Thystère Tchicaya

Personal details
- Born: Jacques Joachim Yhombi-Opango; 12 January 1939 Owando, Cuvette Region, French Equatorial Africa
- Died: 30 March 2020 (aged 81) American Hospital of Paris, Neuilly-sur-Seine, France
- Party: Rally for Democracy and Development (from 1990)
- Other political affiliations: Congolese Party of Labour (until 1979)
- Spouse: Marie-Noëlle Yhombi-Opango (?–2020; his death)

Jacques Joachim Yhombi-Opango (12 January 1939 – 30 March 2020) was a Congolese politician. He was an army officer who became Congo-Brazzaville's first general and served as Head of State of the People's Republic of the Congo from 1977 to 1979. He was the President of the Rally for Democracy and Development (RDD), a political party, and served as Prime Minister from 1993 to 1996. He was in exile from 1997 to 2007.

== Early life ==
Yhombi-Opango was born on 12 January 1939 in Fort Rousset (now Owando) in the Cuvette Region, in the north of the Congo. He married Marie-Noëlle Ngollo, with whom he had several children.

== Career ==
Under President Marien Ngouabi, Yhombi-Opango was Army Chief of Staff (with the rank of major); he was suspended from that position on 30 July 1970, but subsequently restored to it. He was a member of the ruling Congolese Labour Party (PCT) and was associated with the party's right wing. Leftist elements in the PCT claimed in a broadcast on Voice of the Revolution radio on 22 February 1972 that Yhombi-Opango was trying to take power in a rightist coup and that he had ordered the arrest of members of the PCT Political Bureau. This claim was part of an unsuccessful leftist coup attempt led by Lieutenant Ange Diawara. Yhombi-Opango became a member of the Central Committee of the PCT in 1972. He was then promoted to the rank of Colonel and became a member of the PCT's Political Bureau in January 1973. He served as Secretary-General of the Council of State until being moved to the post of Council of State delegate in charge of Defence on 9 November 1974.

=== President ===
Following the assassination of Ngouabi in March 1977, Yhombi-Opango became Head of State. He served in office for nearly two years until being forced to resign in February 1979. Accused of attempting to form a "rightist faction" in the PCT, he was subsequently held in detention for several years by his successor, President Denis Sassou Nguesso. In addition to being placed under house arrest, he was expelled from the PCT and his property was confiscated in 1979; furthermore, he was demoted from the rank of general to that of private, according to an announcement on 20 October 1979. Sassou Nguesso announced Yhombi-Opango's release when the former was sworn in for a second term as president on 10 November 1984, citing "the interest of national unity and peace".

In July 1987, 20 officers were arrested for allegedly plotting a coup, and a commission investigating the plot implicated Yhombi-Opango, along with Captain Pierre Anga. In September 1987, Yhombi-Opango was arrested in connection with this plot. Sassou Nguesso announced his release, along with all other political prisoners, on 14 August 1990, in a move marking the 30th anniversary of Congolese independence. At the February–June 1991 National Conference, some delegates accused Yhombi-Opango and Sassou Nguesso of complicity in Ngouabi's assassination.

=== Prime minister ===
Afterward, Yhombi-Opango was the candidate of his party, the Rally for Democracy and Development (RDD), in the August 1992 presidential election, taking sixth place with 3.49% of the vote. In his native Cuvette Region, he placed second, with 27% of the vote, behind Sassou Nguesso. He allied with President Pascal Lissouba and Lissouba's party, the Pan-African Union for Social Democracy (UPADS), in the first round of the 1993 parliamentary election, held in May, and after the election, Lissouba appointed him as Prime Minister on 23 June 1993. The opposition contested the results, however, and a severe political dispute erupted, with the opposition setting up a rival government. Yhombi-Opango resigned on 13 January 1995 so that Lissouba would be free to consult other parties in the formation of a new government; he was promptly reappointed as Prime Minister, with a new government—including four members of the opposition Union for Democratic Renewal (URD)—being named on 23 January.

Some members of UPADS who were from Lissouba's own Téke ethnic group called for Yhombi-Opango's resignation in 1996 because they wanted the Prime Minister to be a Téke as well. As a result, Yhombi-Opango resigned on 23 August 1996; Lissouba appointed Charles David Ganao to replace him on 27 August.

Sassou-Nguesso's visit to Owando, Yhombi-Opango's political stronghold, in May 1997 led to an outbreak of violence between his supporters and those of Yhombi-Opango. Following this incident, a civil war began in June, leading to Lissouba's ouster in October 1997; Yhombi-Opango supported Lissouba during the war, serving as leader of the Presidential Majority, and after Sassou-Nguesso's victory, he fled into exile in Côte d'Ivoire and France.

=== Exile ===
In December 2001, Yhombi-Opango joined two other exiled politicians, Lissouba and Bernard Kolélas, in rejecting the electoral process begun under Sassou-Nguesso, saying that it was not transparent. Along with Lissouba and Kolélas, he called for a passive boycott of the January 2002 constitutional referendum.

Yhombi-Opango was sentenced in absentia to 20 years of hard labor for embezzlement in late December 2001. Also convicted in this trial were Lissouba (who received a 30-year sentence) and three other former members of the government (former prime minister Claude Antoine Dacosta, former Minister of Finance Nguila Mougounga Nkombo, and former Minister of Oil Benoit Koukebene). The charge of embezzlement was based on an accusation that Lissouba, Yhombi-Opango, and the others made a corrupt deal with Occidental Petroleum to sell oil to the company for 150 million US dollars in 1993; the sum was said to amount to less than a fourth of the oil's actual value. The money from this deal was allegedly never placed in the Treasury; instead, part of the money was said to have been placed in a private bank account in Belgium, while the remainder was said to have been used for electoral campaigning. Claudine Munari, who had been Director of the Cabinet, said in defense of the accused that there was no alternative to the deal and that the money was used to pay wage arrears and organize the 1993 parliamentary election. The accused were also charged with misappropriating public funds, but this charge did not result in a conviction.

A dispute in the RDD leadership emerged in 2005. Yhombi-Opango, still in exile, asked the party leadership in Congo-Brazzaville to approach the governing PCT, but Saturnin Okabé, who led the party in Yhombi-Opango's absence, refused to do so. Yhombi-Opango reacted angrily to this refusal.

=== Return ===
An amnesty for Yhombi-Opango was approved by the Congolese Council of Ministers on 18 May 2007. He returned to Congo-Brazzaville on 10 August 2007, and a thousand of his supporters were present to welcome him. At a meeting of the RDD Steering Committee on 8 September 2007, Yhombi-Opango reassumed the leadership of the party from interim president Saturnin Okabé and Secretary-General Martial Mathieu Kani. On this occasion, Yhombi-Opango announced his intention to reorganize the party and improve its position on the national political scene.

Yhombi-Opango and his wife divided their time between Congo and France from 2007 until he died in 2020.

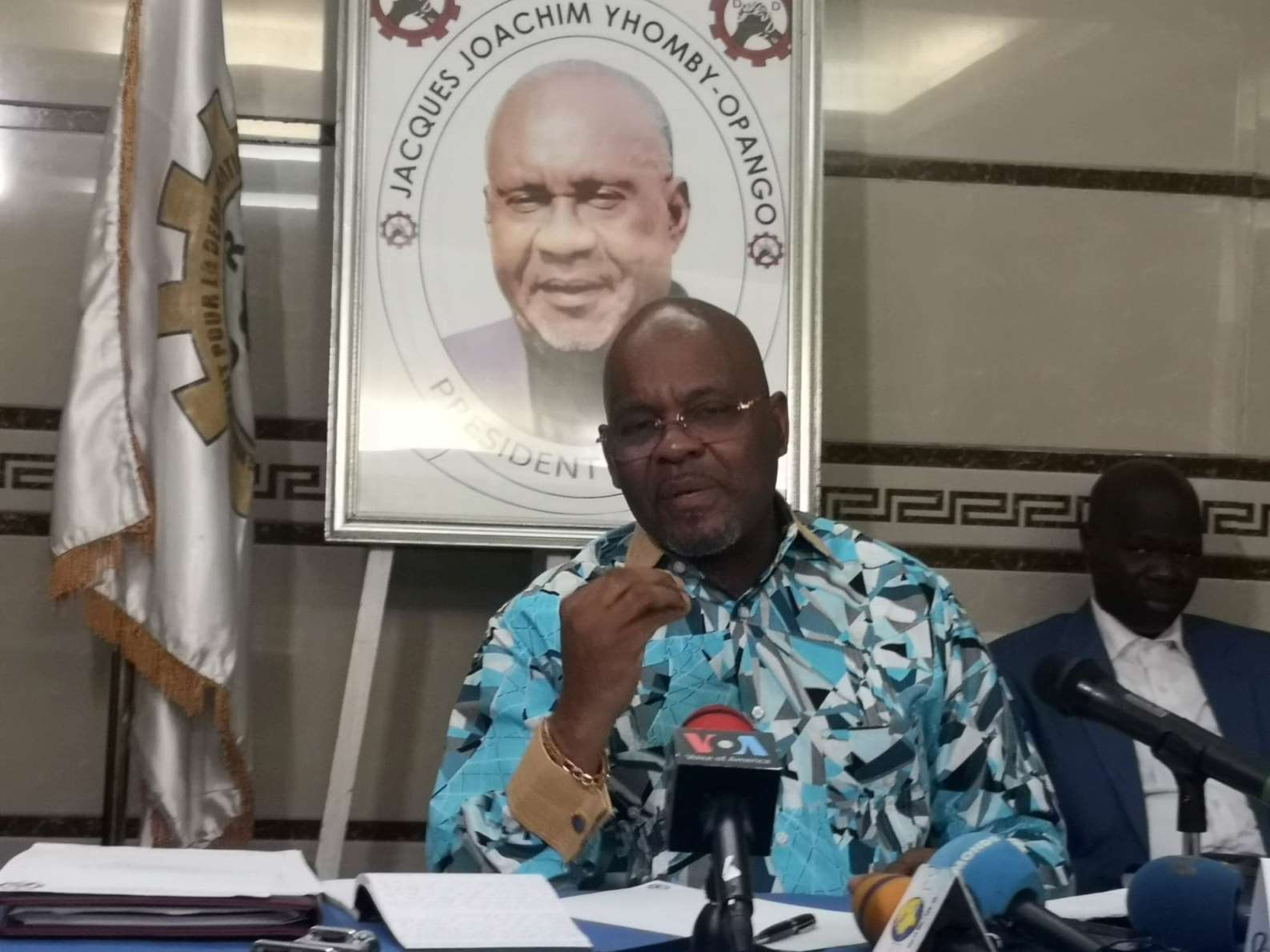
Yhombi-Opango's son Jean-Jacques, a vice president of the RDD

== Personal life ==
Yhombi-Opango spent over a year in France for medical reasons before returning to Brazzaville on 1 June 2013.

Joachim Yhombi-Opango died on 30 March 2020, at the American Hospital of Paris in Neuilly-sur-Seine, France, from COVID-19 at the age of 81. His son, Jean-Jacques Yhombi Opango, first confirmed his death during a phone call with Agence France-Presse. Télé Congo, the country's national television station, re-confirmed the information during its evening news show.

He was buried in Owando, Congo, on 31 October 2020.

Political offices
Preceded by Military Committee of the Congolese Labour Party	President of the People's Republic of the Congo; 1977–1979	Succeeded by Denis Sassou Nguesso
Preceded by Claude Antoine Dacosta	Prime Minister of Congo-Brazzaville; 1993–1996	Succeeded by Charles David Ganao
