= Telephone numbers in the Republic of the Congo =

Telephone numbers in the Republic of the Congo use the country calling code +242, with 00 as the international call prefix and 0 as the domestic trunk prefix. Telephone numbers have nine-digit national significant numbers, and calls from outside the country use +242 followed by the nine-digit number. Fixed-line numbers use geographic area codes beginning with 22, including separate allocations for Brazzaville and Pointe-Noire and for other areas of the country, while mobile numbers use prefixes including 01, 04, 05, and 06. The numbering plan also includes ranges beginning with 8 for value-added services and three-digit service numbers for police, fire, child-helpline, and customer services.

== Dialing codes and prefixes ==
Country Code: +242
International Call Prefix: 00
Trunk Prefix: 0

== Calling formats ==
To call in the Republic of the Congo, the following format is used:

- yy zz xxxxx Calls within Republic of the Congo
- +242 yy zz xxxxx Calls from outside Republic of the Congo

The NSN length is nine digits.

== List of area codes in the Republic of the Congo ==
LIST OF AREA CODES
Area Code	Area City
22 21	Cuvette (Basin, West Basin)
22 22	Likouala
22 22	Sangha
22 23	Pool
22 24	Plateaux
22 25	Lekoumou
22 25	Bouenza
22 25	Niari
22 28	Brazzaville
22 29	Pointe-Noire

LIST OF MOBILE PREFIXES
Area Code	Usage
01	Equateur Telecom Congo (GSM)
04	Warid Congo (GSM)
05	Celtel-Congo (GSM)
06	MTN-Congo (GSM)

VALUE ADDED SERVICES
NDC	NSN	Usage	Additional information
8 00XX XXXX	9 digits	Green number and other services	Digital mobile (GSM, UMTS) telephonic services
8 1XX XXXXX	9 digits		Shared cost
8 300 XXXXX	9 digits	Internet access	Internet Provider (ISP)
8 8XX XXXXX	9 digits		Shared revenue
8 900 XXXXX	9 digits	Future Services	NGN services

SERVICE NUMBERS
NDC	Usage	NSN Length	Usage
112	constabulary	3 digits	Mobile and fixed service
116	Child helpline	3 digits	Mobile and fixed service
117	police	3 digits	Mobile and fixed service
118	firemen	3 digits	Mobile and fixed service
111	customer service	3 digits	Mobile service

LIST OF OLD MOBILE PREFIXES
Area Code	Usage	Changed to
44, 442	Mobile Phones - CYRUS	04 44, 04 442
52, 53, 55	Mobile Phones - Celtel Congo	05 52, 05 53, 05 55
66, 67	Mobile Phones - Libertis Telecom	06 66, 06 67
