= Cabinet of the Republic of the Congo =

The Cabinet of the Republic of the Congo governs the nation.

== Current cabinet ==
The current government is that of Anatole Collinet Makosso which has been in place since 15 May 2021.
