= Mbosi people =

The Mbochi (or M'Boshi) are a Bantu ethnic group in Central Africa. Their language originates from the regions of the African Great Lakes where they began, after a long migration from the east to the centre, over the years, until 1850. This central African ethnic group as a population is concentrated in the northern region of the Republic of the Congo. The current Congolese president, Denis Sassou-Nguesso, as well as many senior government officials, belong to this group. Mbochi is the traditional language spoken in the northern regions of la Cuvette (districts of Boundji; Ngoko; d'Owando, d'Oyo; Bokouélé; Tongo; Tchikapika and of Mossaka) also in the region of the Plateaux (districts of Olombo; Abala, Allembé and Ogogni).
