= Coat of arms of the Republic of the Congo =

National coat of arms

- Armiger: Republic of the Congo
- Adopted: 1960 (readopted in 1991)
- Crest: A special forest crown. On the circle or of the forest crown: "République du Congo" in letters gules upon a scroll or.
- Shield: Or, a fess wavy Vert, a lion rampant Gules, armed and langued Vert, overall, maintaining a torch Sable flamed Gules.
- Supporters: Two war elephants sable tusked or, issuing from the flanks of the shield
- Compartment: A tree trunk gules
- Motto: Unité, Travail, Progrès "Unity, Work, Progress"

The coat of arms of the Republic of the Congo has a shield with a rampant red lion holding a torch. The background color of the shield is gold with a green, wavy, horizontal stripe along the middle. A golden crown sits above the shield. Two large African war elephants support the shield. A banner with the national motto "Unité, Travail, Progrès" (lit. 'Unity, Work, Progress'; translated from "La Congolaise") is draped from a bar supporting the war elephants. The arms were adopted in 1960 and readopted in 1991 after having been replaced with a simpler, unheraldic symbol during the People's Republic of the Congo era from 1970 to 1991.

== Official description ==
The coat of arms is described as follows:

- Or, a fess wavy vert, a lion gules, armed and langued vert, overall, maintaining a torch sable flamed gules.
- A special forest crown.
- The shield is supported by two war elephants sable tusked or, issuing from the flanks of the shield and sustained on a tree trunk gules.
- On the circle or of the forest crown: "République du Congo" in letters gules upon a scroll or.
- Motto "Unité-Travail-Progrès" in letters gules upon a scroll or.

== Historical symbols ==
Seal of the Republic of the Congo (1958–1963)

Emblem of the People's Republic of the Congo (1970–1991)
