= Alphonse Massamba-Débat =

President of Congo-Brazzaville from 1963 to 1968

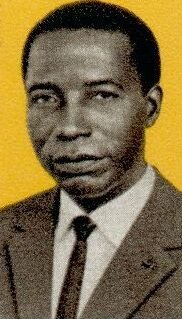
- Massamba-Débat in 1965

2nd President of the Republic of the Congo
- In office 16 August 1963 – 4 September 1968
- Preceded by: Fulbert Youlou
- Succeeded by: Alfred Raoul

1st Prime Minister of the Republic of the Congo
- In office 16 August 1963 – 19 December 1963
- Succeeded by: Pascal Lissouba

Presidents of the National Assembly of Congo
- In office 1 July 1959 – 1961
- Preceded by: Christian Jayle
- Succeeded by: Marcel Ibalico

Personal details
- Born: 11 February 1921 Nkolo, French Equatorial Africa
- Died: 25 March 1977 (aged 56) Brazzaville, People's Republic of the Congo
- Cause of death: Executed by Shooting
- Party: National Movement of the Revolution; Chadian Progressive Party
- Other political affiliations: Congolese Progressive Party; Democratic Union for the Defense of African Interests
- Spouse: Marie Massamba-Debat

Alphonse Massamba-Débat (February 11, 1921 – March 25, 1977) was a political figure of the Republic of the Congo who led the country from 1963 until 1968 in a one-party system.

== Biography ==
=== Early life ===
He was born in the small village of Nkolo, Boko District, French Equatorial Africa, in 1921, into a Kongo family. He attended missionary school and primary schooling at the Boko Regional School. He then received training as a teacher at the Edouard Renard school in Brazzaville. By the age of 13, he was a teacher and went to teach in Chad from 1945 to 1948. By 1940, he had joined the anti-colonialist Chadian Progressive Party and served as the general secretary of the Association for the Development of Chad in 1945. In 1947, he moved back to Congo and was principal of a school in Mossendjo from 1948 to 1953, then in Mindouli from 1953 to 1956. He was also the headmaster of Bakongo Secular School in Brazzaville in 1957 and joined the Congolese Progressive Party (PPC).

=== Career ===
By 1957, Massamba-Débat had joined Fulbert Youlou's Democratic Union for the Defense of African Interests party (UDDIA), stopped teaching and became the Minister of Education and two years later he was elected to national assembly. In 1959, he was made president of the assembly and remained in power, later serving as minister of state and of planning but he began to criticize the administration of Youlou, Congo's first president, whom many perceived to be overly reliant on France.

When President Fulbert Youlou was deposed in a coup d'état on August 15, 1963, the presidency was suspended. Massamba-Débat, Chairman of the National Council of the Revolution, was declared Prime Minister the next day, and the National Council of the Revolution was declared the only legal political party in the country. Massamba-Débat was elected President on December 19, 1963, with Pascal Lissouba standing in as the new Prime Minister.

==== Congo under Massamba-Débat (1963–1968) ====
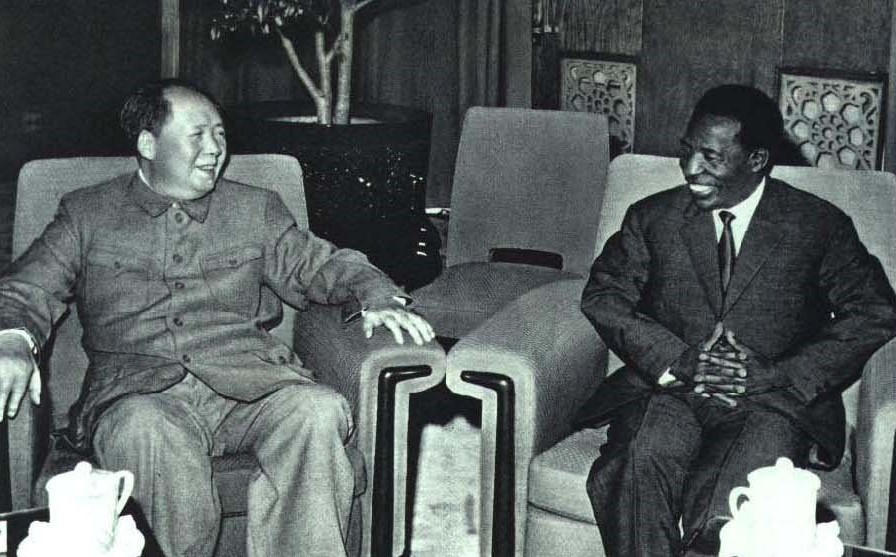
Massamba-Débat meeting with Mao Zedong in 1964.

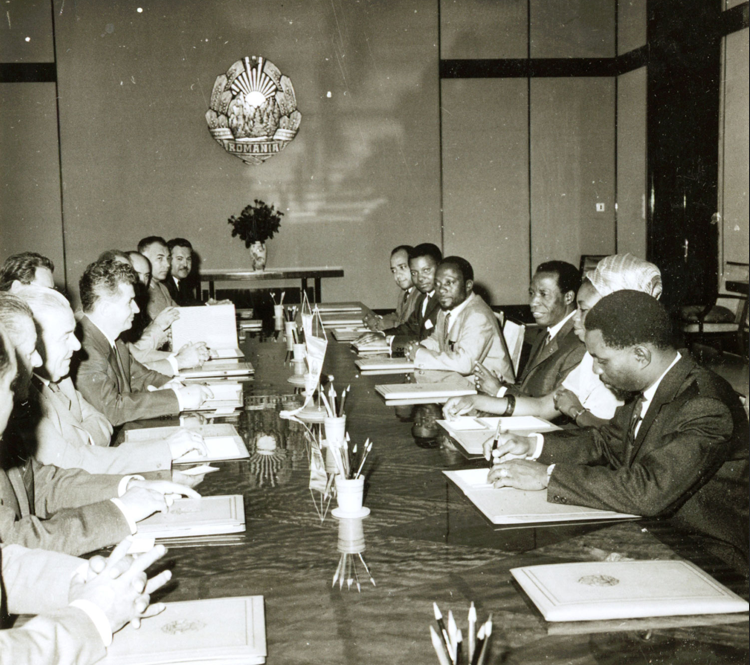
Massamba-Débat meeting with Romania's Nicolae Ceaușescu, 1968

The government of Massamba-Débat attempted to undertake a political economic strategy of "scientific socialism." By July 1964 Massamba-Débat's government had declared one-party rule under the National Movement of the Revolution and a campaign of nationalizations began. Internationally Massamba-Débat aligned his country with the USSR and Communist China and he allowed nominally communist guerrillas to base themselves on Congolese territory.

Under Massamba-Debat the Congo was ideologically aligned more with countries of a socialist nature, especially Cuba and China, while moving away from capitalist countries. Che Guevara went to meet Massamba-Débat in January 1965 and diplomatic relations were severed with the United States. Relations were strained with the neighboring Democratic Republic of the Congo, whose political path was increasingly influenced by Mobutist ambitions. Consequently, the Tshombe government expelled the citizens of Congo-Brazzaville who lived in the former Belgian Congo.

On the economic and social level, Massamba-Débat led a healthy and rigorous management. Under his presidency, the Congo began to industrialize and the standard of living of the Congolese improved. Some large production units with large workforces were built: the textile factory of Kinsoundi, the palm groves of Etoumbi, the match factory of Bétou, the shipyards of Yoro, etc. Health centers were created as well as school groups (colleges and elementary school). The country's school enrollment rate became the highest in Black Africa. At the same time, Brazzaville became a center for left-wing exiles from all over Central Africa.

Massamba-Débat also attempted to form popular militia units in 1966 with the help of the Cuban army. For 10 days in June and July 1966, members of the military attempted to overthrow his government after he had attempted to place the military under a single command. In the failed coup attempt, several hundred Cuban troops sheltered members of Massamba-Débat's government and he was eventually able to return to power after giving in to some of the coup leaders demands.

On August 5, 1968, the new National Council of the Revolution (CNR) was formed, along with a new government, with 40 members including Massamba-Débat.

In July 1968, he arrested Captain Ngouabi, dissolved the National Assembly and the Political Bureau of the MNR and suspended the 1963 Constitution. This resulted in a confrontation between supporters of the Civil Defense and part of the army. He was then forced to amnesty all political prisoners and deal with his opponents. Following the coup tensions remained between Massamba-Débat's administration and the military and on September 4, 1968 Massamba-Débat's government was overthrown by Marien Ngouabi, the chairman of the same party that had brought Massamba-Débat to power.

==== Life under house arrest ====
Following the bloodless coup of 1968 Massamba-Débat was forced to leave politics and Massamba-Débat returned to his home town. A few hours after Ngouabi's assassination Massamba-Débat was placed under arrest. When Ngouabi was murdered in 1977, many people were arrested and tried for plotting the assassination, including Massamba-Débat. Massamba-Débat was executed on the night of March 25, 1977, by firing squad.

== See also ==
- Cold War§Competition in the Third World
- People's Republic of the Congo

Political offices
Preceded by Fulbert Youlou post abolished, 1959–1963	Prime Minister of the Republic of the Congo; 1963	Succeeded by Pascal Lissouba
Preceded by Fulbert Youlou	President of the Republic of the Congo; 1963–1968	Succeeded by Alfred Raoul
