= Marien Ngouabi =

President of Congo-Brazzaville from 1969 to 1977

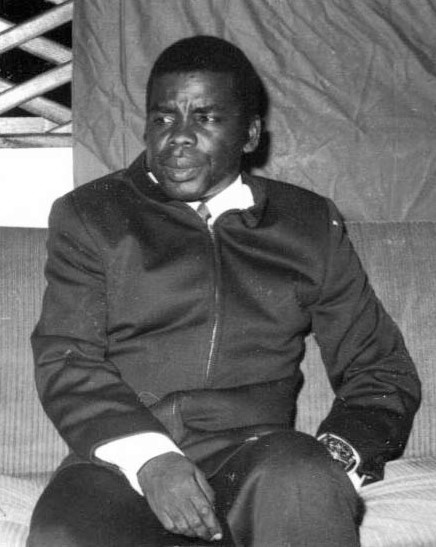
- Ngouabi in 1972

4th President of the People's Republic of the Congo
- In office 1 January 1969 – 18 March 1977
- Vice President: Ange Diawara; Aimé Portella; Alfred Raoul; Aloïse Moudileno-Massengo; Ange-Édouard Poungui
- Preceded by: Alfred Raoul
- Succeeded by: Joachim Yhombi-Opango

Personal details
- Born: December 31, 1938 Ombellé, Cuvette, French Equatorial Africa
- Died: March 18, 1977 (aged 38) Brazzaville, People's Republic of the Congo
- Cause of death: Assassination
- Party: Congolese Party of Labor
- Other political affiliations: National Movement of the Revolution
- Spouse: Clotilde Ngouabi
- Relations: Pierre Anga (uncle)
- Education: École spéciale militaire de Saint-Cyr

Military service
- Allegiance: People's Republic of the Congo
- Branch/service: Armed Forces of the Republic of the Congo
- Rank: General of the army

Flag of the Congo Army (1970–1992) used during Ngouabi's rule

Marien Ngouabi (December 31, 1938 – March 18, 1977) was a Congolese politician and military officer who served as the fourth President of the People's Republic of the Congo from 1969 until his assassination in 1977.

== Early life and education ==
Marien Ngouabi was born on December 31, 1938, at the village of Ombellé, Cuvette Department, in Kouyou territory to Dominique Osséré m'Opoma and Antoinette Mboualé-Abemba. He is originally from a kuyu humble family. From 1947 to 1953, he went to primary school in Owando. On 14 September 1953, he went to study at the Ecole des enfants de troupes Général Leclerc in Brazzaville and in 1957, he was sent to Bouar, Oubangui-Chari (now the Central African Republic).

== Political career ==
After serving in Cameroon as a member of the second battalion of the tirailleurs with the rank of Sergeant (1958–1960), Ngouabi went to the Ecole Militaire Préparatoire in Strasbourg, France, in September 1960 and then to the Ecole Inter-armes at Coëtquidan Saint-Cyr in 1961. He returned to Congo in 1962 as Second Lieutenant and was stationed at the Pointe-Noire garrison. He was assigned to the Pointe-Noire garrison as a deputy commander of an infantry battalion. In 1963, Ngouabi was promoted to the rank of Lieutenant.

=== Rise to power ===
In 1965, he created the first battalion of paratroopers in the Congo Republic. Known for his leftist views, in April 1966 Ngouabi was demoted to the rank of soldier second class when he refused to be posted again at Pointe-Noire, after rebelling against the army's inflexibility in politics and voicing strong criticism to the president. President Alphonse Massamba-Débat had Ngouabi and Second Lieutenant Eyabo arrested on July 29, 1968.

Ngouabi's arrest provoked discontent among the military, and on July 31, Ngouabi was freed by soldiers from the Civil Defense. The National Revolutionary Council (CNR), headed by Ngouabi, was created on August 5, 1968. On 1 October 1968, he was promoted to the rank of Commanding Officer, a rank he held until his death. Massamba-Débat, whose powers had been curtailed by the CNR, resigned on September 4, and Prime Minister Alfred Raoul served as acting head of state until December 31, 1968, when the CNR formally became the country's supreme authority and Ngouabi, as head of the CNR, assumed the presidency.

=== Head of state ===
Once in power, President Ngouabi changed the country's name to the People's Republic of the Congo, declaring it to be Africa's first Marxist–Leninist state, and founded the Congolese Workers' Party (Parti Congolais du Travail, PCT) as the country's only legal political party.

Ngouabi was a Mbochi from the north and his regime shifted control of the country away from the south. Such moves created opposition among the population in the highly politicized environment of Brazzaville. Bureaucratic centralism, repression, the "mechanism" of the party apparatus, and Ngouabi's tribalist orientation towards Mbochi and La Cuvette immigrants created opposition within the Communist Party itself, especially its youth organization. In the fall of 1971, students that went on strike in Brazzaville and Pointe Noire were severely repressed by the authorities. The situation in the country was severely destabilized. There was an attempted coup in February 1972 that triggered a series of 'purges' of the opposition. It is claimed that Ngouabi was under French pressure to annex the oil-rich Cabinda enclave, a part of Portuguese Angola, and his refusal to act cost him the French support. There is some speculation that the French financed several coups in order to remove Ngouabi from power. Starting in February 1973, the army began military operations in the Goma Tse-tse region to dismantle the M22 insurgency led by former army members led by Vice President Ange Diawara. During the same month, Ngouabi denounced another attempted Diawara coup and arrested 45 people, including Pascal Lissouba and Sylvain Bemba, Minister of Information. His trial took place from March 16 to 23. Several sentences were pronounced, while Lissouba was acquitted.

The M22 business abruptly ended on April 24, 1973, with the capture and execution of the maquis. The bodies of Diawara, Ikoko and Bakekolo were toured around Brazzaville and exhibited by Ngouabi in person during a popular gathering held at the Stade de la Révolution. The lack of consideration for the lifeless bodies of the Maquis caused considerable disapproval nationally due to the cultural sensitivity surrounding the reverential treatment of dead bodies. He visited the People's Republic of China in July 1973.

Ngouabi was re-elected to his post as Chairman of the PCT Central Committee on December 30, 1974; he was additionally elected as Permanent Secretary of the PCT. He was then sworn in as president for another term on January 9, 1975. Also in 1975, he signed an economic aid pact with the Soviet Union.

On March 23, Lieutenant General Pierre Kinganga, in exile in Kinshasa in neighbouring Zaire since his alleged June 1969 coup attempt, disembarked in Brazzaville at the head of a commando attempting to overthrow the regime. His attempt failed and he was shot dead near the national radio station he had just taken. His body and that of his command members who fell with him remained exposed for a long time in front of the radio building. Several enthusiastic young supporters who had joined Kinganga's column were also armed. Captain Augustin Poignet, also involved, managed to escape to Kinshasa. A week later, 3 accomplices (Miawouama, Nkoutou and Mengo), sentenced by a court-martial, were executed. The command members and accomplices in the army and gendarmerie were convicted by the revolutionary court. After the events, Marien Ngouabi denounced the involvement of the CIA and President Mobutu Sese Seko of Zaire (now Democratic Republic of the Congo) in the coup.

Following this attempt, the PCT met in an extraordinary congress from March 30 to April 2, 1970. The Political Bureau was expanded to 10 members, to the benefit of Ambroise Noumazalaye and Captain Sassou N'Guesso. The Gendarmerie, whose loyalty was not complete during the events, was dissolved and its members joined the army. The Council of State was reorganized.

On August 29, 1970, former Minister Stéphane-Maurice Bongo-Nouarra was arrested for a counter-revolutionary conspiracy. He was sentenced to 10 years of forced labour.

== Assassination and aftermath ==
On March 18, 1977, at 14:30 hours, Ngouabi was shot and killed in Brazzaville led by Barthélemy Kikadidi. He was 38 years old. Those accused of taking part in the assassination were tried and some were executed, including Kikadidi and Massamba-Débat. He was buried in Marien Ngouabi Mausoleum, Brazzaville, Republic of the Congo.

In the aftermath of the assassination, the Military Committee of the Party (CMP) was named to head an interim government with the conservative Colonel Joachim Yhombi-Opango to serve as Head of State.

Political offices
Preceded by Alfred Raoul	President of the People's Republic of the Congo; 1969–1977	Succeeded by Military Committee of the Congolese Labour Party
