= Republic of the Congo =

Country in Central Africa

République du Congo (French)
(in national languages)
| Lingala | Republíki ya Kongó |
| Kituba | Repubilika ya Kôngo |
- Flag Coat of arms
- Motto: "Unité, Travail, Progrès" (French) (English: "Unity, Work, Progress")
- Anthem: "La Congolaise" (French); Besi Kôngo (Kongo) (English: "The Congolese")
- Capital and largest city: Brazzaville; 4°16′S 15°17′E
- Official languages: French
- Recognised national languages: Kituba; Lingala
- Ethnic groups: 41% Bakongo; 16.9% Bateke; 13.1% Mbochi; 5.6% Sangha; 2% Mbenga Pygmies; and others
- Religion (2025): 87.2% Christianity; 8.1% no religion; 2.7% Islam; 0.4% traditional faiths; 1.6% others
- Demonyms: Congolese; Congo
- Government: Unitary semi-presidential republic under an authoritarian dictatorship
  - President: Denis Sassou Nguesso
  - Prime Minister: Anatole Collinet Makosso
  - President of Senate: Pierre Ngolo
  - President of the National Assembly: Isidore Mvouba
- Legislature: Parliament
  - Upper house: Senate
  - Lower house: National Assembly

Independence from France
  - Kingdom of Loango: c. 1550 - c. 1883
  - French Congo: 1882 - 1910
  - Administrated under French Equatorial Africa: 1910 - 1958
  - Republic established: 28 November 1958
  - 1968 coup: 4 September 1968
  - Establishment of the People's Republic of the Congo: 31 December 1969
  - Disestablishment of the People's Republic: 15 March 1992
  - First Civil War: 1993 - 1994
  - Second Civil War: 1997 - 1999
  - Referendum: 25 October 2015
  - Current constitution: 2015

Area
  - Total: 342,000 km^{2} (132,000 sq mi) (64th)
  - Water (%): 3.3

Population
  - 2023 estimate: ▲6,228,784 (116th)
  - 2023 census: 6,142,180
  - Density: 19/km^{2} (49.2/sq mi) (212th)
- GDP (PPP): 2025 estimate
  - Total: ▲$42.760 billion (140th)
  - Per capita: ▲$6,590 (143rd)
- GDP (nominal): 2025 estimate
  - Total: ▲$15.281 billion (141st)
  - Per capita: ▲$2,360 (151st)
- Gini (2011): 48.9 high inequality
- HDI (2023): ▲0.649 medium (138th)
- Currency: Central African CFA franc (XAF)
- Time zone: UTC+1 (WAT)
- Calling code: +242
- ISO 3166 code: CG
- Internet TLD: .cg

The Republic of the Congo, (Note: French: République du Congo, Lingala: Republíki ya Kongó) also commonly known as the Congo Republic, Congo-Brazzaville, or simply Congo, (Note: Its name from 1971 to 1997, the period during which the neighboring Democratic Republic of the Congo was officially named Zaire.) is a country located on the western coast of Central Africa to the west of the Congo River. It is bordered to the west by Gabon, to the northwest by Cameroon, to the northeast by the Central African Republic, to the southeast by the Democratic Republic of the Congo, to the south by the Angolan exclave of Cabinda.

The region was dominated by Bantu-speaking tribes at least 3,000 years ago, who built trade links leading into the Congo River basin. From the 13th century, the present-day territory was dominated by a confederation led by Vungu which included Kakongo and Ngoyo. The Tio Kingdom emerged in the 14th century, and Loango in the 16th century. In the late 19th century France colonised the region and incorporated it into French Equatorial Africa. The Republic of the Congo was established on 28 November 1958 and gained independence from France in 1960. It was a Marxist–Leninist state from 1969 to 1992, under the name People's Republic of the Congo (PRC). After the introduction of multi-party elections in 1992, the democratically elected government was overthrown during the civil war, after which Denis Sassou Nguesso, who had previously served as president from 1979 to 1992, returned to office in 1997. He has remained president since then.

The Republic of the Congo is a member of the African Union, the United Nations, La Francophonie, the Economic Community of Central African States, and the Non-Aligned Movement. It is the fourth-largest oil producer in the Gulf of Guinea, providing the country a degree of prosperity, with political and economic instability in some areas and unequal distribution of oil revenue nationwide. Its economy is dependent on the oil sector and economic growth slowed after the post-2015 drop in oil prices.

== Etymology ==
It is named after the Congo River whose name is derived from Kongo, a Bantu kingdom that occupied its mouth around the time the Portuguese first arrived in 1483 or 1484. The kingdom's name derived from its people, the Bakongo, an endonym said to mean "hunters" (Kongo: mukongo, nkongo).

During the period when France colonised it, it was known as the French Congo or Middle Congo. The Republic of the Congo, or simply the Congo, is a distinct country from the Democratic Republic of the Congo, also known as the DR Congo. Brazzaville's name derives from the colony's founder, Pierre Savorgnan de Brazzà, an Italian nobleman whose title referred to the town of Brazzacco, in the Italian comune of Moruzzo in Friuli-Venezia Giulia, whose name derived from the Latin Brattius or Braccius, both meaning literally "arm".

== History ==
Bantu-speaking peoples, who founded tribes during the Bantu expansions, mostly displaced and absorbed the earlier inhabitants of the region, the Pygmy people, about 1500 BC. The Bakongo, a Bantu ethnic group that occupied parts of what later became Angola, Gabon, and the Democratic Republic of the Congo, formed the basis for ethnic affinities and rivalries among those countries.

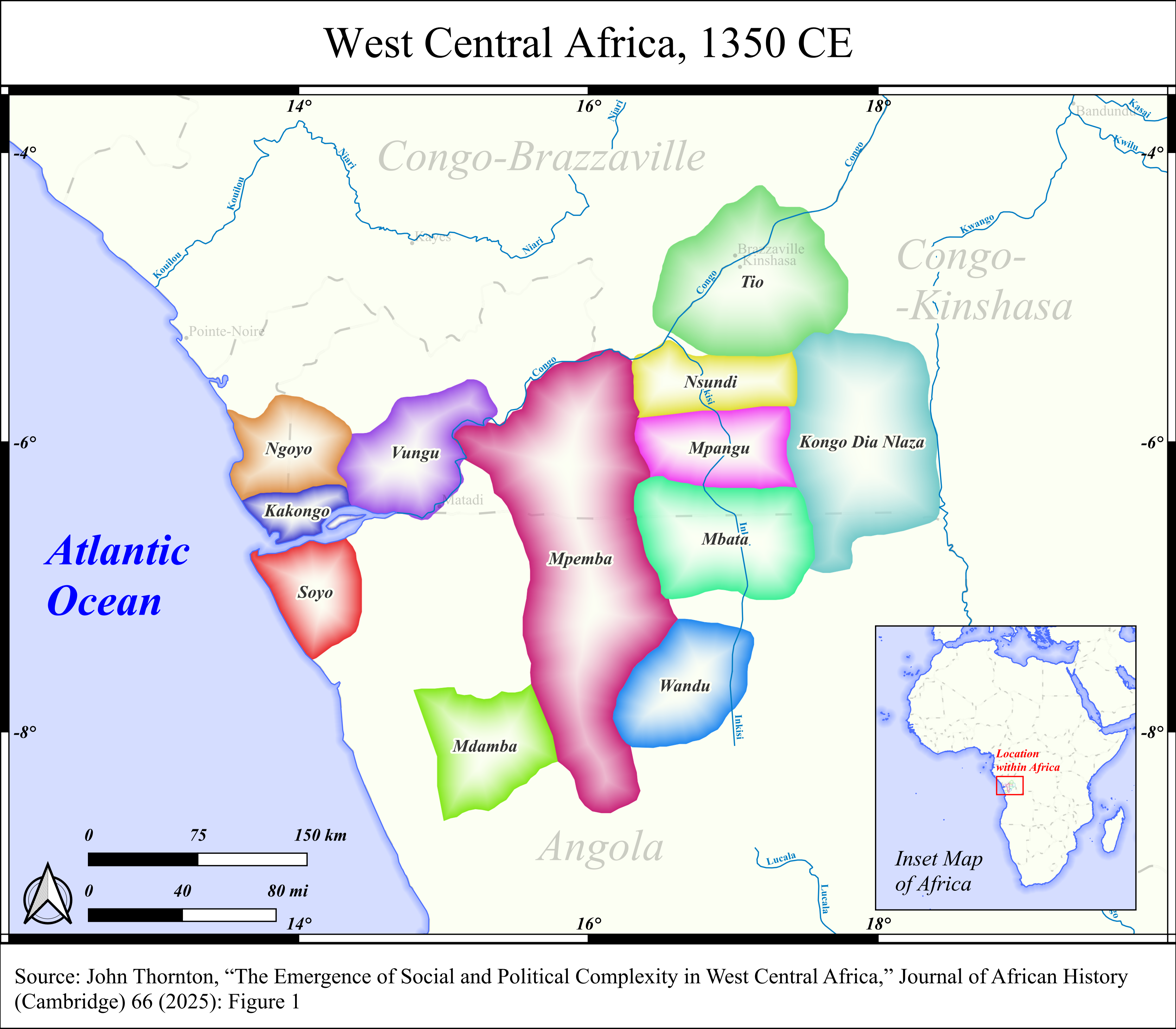
States of the western Congo Basin, c. 1350

By the 13th century, there were three main federations of states in the western Congo Basin. In the east were the Seven Kingdoms of Kongo dia Nlaza, considered to be the oldest and most powerful, which likely included Nsundi, Mbata, Mpangu, and possibly Kundi and Okanga. South of these was Mpemba which stretched from modern-day Angola to the Congo River. It included various kingdoms such as Mpemba Kasi and Vunda. To its west across the Congo River was a confederation of three small states; Vungu (its leader), Kakongo, and Ngoyo. Some Bantu kingdoms—including those of the Kongo, the Tio, and Loango—built trade links leading into the Congo Basin. The Tio Kingdom formed in the 14th century; the association of kingship with smithing is believed to have originated among the Tio before spreading to the kingdoms of Loango and Kongo.

The Portuguese explorer Diogo Cão reached the mouth of the Congo in 1484. Commercial relationships grew between the inland Bantu kingdoms and European merchants who traded in commodities, manufactured goods, and people captured and enslaved in the hinterlands. After centuries as a central hub for transatlantic trade, direct European colonization of the Congo River delta began in the 19th century, subsequently eroding the power of the Bantu societies in the region.

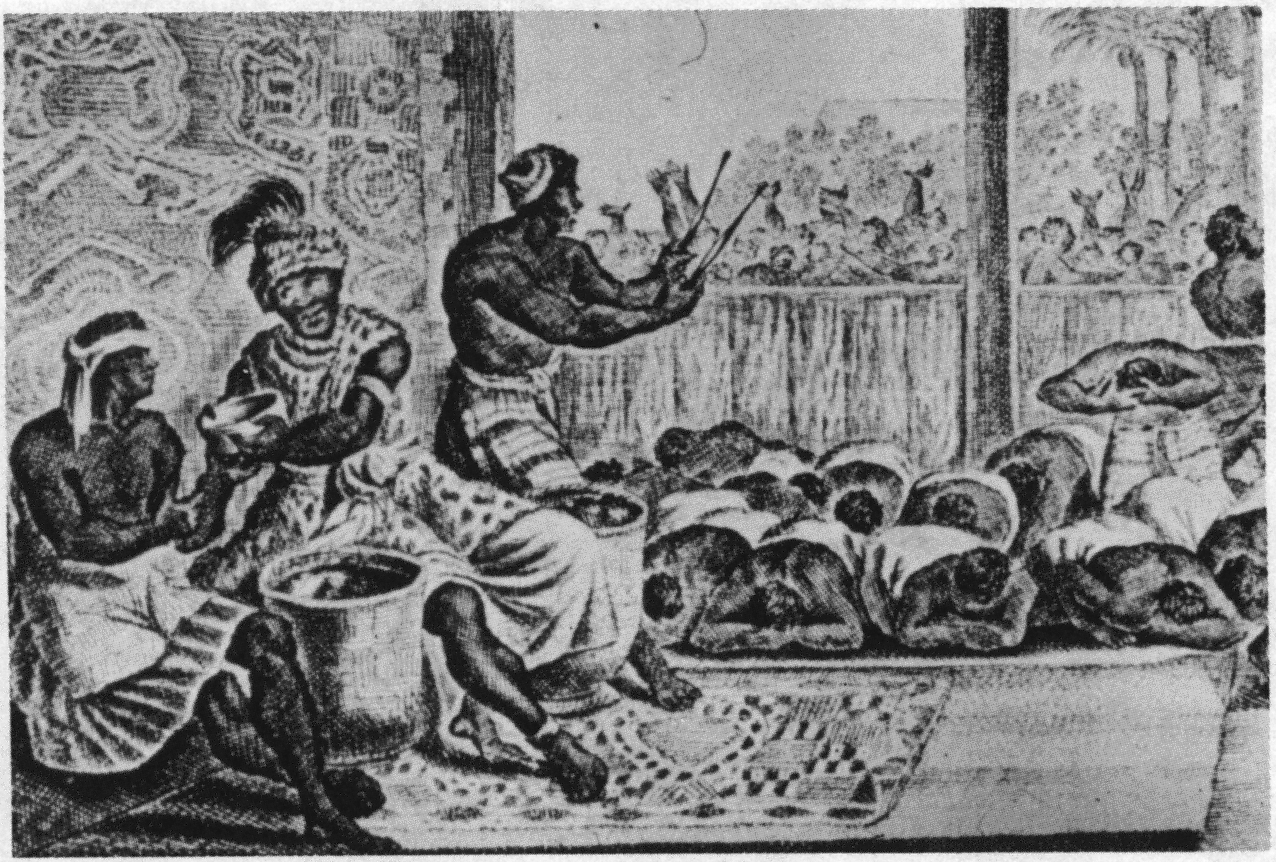
The court of N'Gangue M'voumbe Niambi, from the book Description of Africa (1668)

The area north of the Congo River came under French sovereignty in 1880 as a result of Pierre de Brazza's treaty with Tio King Iloo I. (Note: De Brazza promised benefits of trade and an alliance, which was likely interpreted as military assistance. While some sources attest that Iloo was aware of the condition, Jan Vansina wrote that "it seems clear that he only wanted to cede land for the establishment of a commercial station", and that his desire for an alliance may have been influenced by the hostility of Henry Stanley's expedition a few years earlier.) After the death of Iloo, his widow Queen Ngalifourou upheld the terms of the treaty and became an ally to the colonizers. This Congo Colony became known first as French Congo, then as Middle Congo in 1903.

In 1908, France organized French Equatorial Africa (AEF), comprising the Middle Congo, Gabon, Chad, and Oubangui-Chari (which later became the Central African Republic). The French designated Brazzaville as the federal capital. Economic development during the first 50 years of colonial rule in Congo centered on natural resource extraction. Construction of the Congo–Ocean Railway following World War I has been estimated to have cost at least 14,000 lives.

During the Nazi occupation of France during World War II, Brazzaville functioned as the symbolic capital of Free France between 1940 and 1943. The Brazzaville Conference of 1944 heralded a period of reform in French colonial policy. Congo "benefited" from the postwar expansion of colonial administrative and infrastructure spending as a result of its central geographic location within AEF and the federal capital at Brazzaville. It had a local legislature after the adoption of the 1946 constitution that established the Fourth Republic.

Following the revision of the French constitution that established the Fifth Republic in 1958, AEF dissolved into its constituent parts, each of which became an autonomous colony within the French Community. During these reforms, Middle Congo became known as the Republic of the Congo in 1958 and published its first constitution in 1959. Antagonism between the Mbochis (who favored Jacques Opangault) and the Laris and Kongos (who favored Fulbert Youlou, the first black mayor elected in French Equatorial Africa) resulted in a series of riots in Brazzaville in February 1959, which the French Army subdued.

Elections took place in April 1959. By the time the Congo became independent in August 1960, Opangault, the former opponent of Youlou, agreed to serve under him. Youlou, an avid anti-communist, became the first President of the Republic of the Congo. Since the political tension was so high in Pointe-Noire, Youlou moved the capital to Brazzaville.

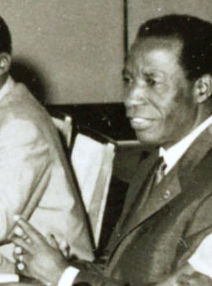
Alphonse Massamba-Débat's one-party rule (1963–1968) attempted to implement a political economic strategy of "scientific socialism".

The Republic of the Congo became fully independent from France on 15 August 1960. Youlou ruled as the country's first president until labor elements and rival political parties instigated a three-day uprising that ousted him. The Congolese military took over the country and installed a civilian provisional government headed by Alphonse Massamba-Débat.

Under the 1963 constitution, Massamba-Débat was elected president for a five-year term. During Massamba-Débat's term in office, the regime adopted "scientific socialism" as the country's constitutional ideology. In 1964, Congo sent an official team with a single athlete at the Olympic Games for the first time in its history. In 1965, Congo established relations with the Soviet Union, the People's Republic of China, North Korea, and North Vietnam. Under his presidency, the Congo began to industrialize. Some large production units with large workforces were built: the textile factory of Kinsoundi, the palm groves of Etoumbi, the match factory of Bétou, the shipyards of Yoro, etc. Health centers were created as well as school groups (colleges and elementary school). The country's school enrollment rate became the highest in Black Africa.

On the night of 14 to 15 February 1965, three public officials of the Republic of the Congo were kidnapped: Lazare Matsocota (prosecutor of the Republic), Joseph Pouabou (President of the Supreme Court), and Anselme Massouémé (director of the Congolese Information Agency). The bodies of two of these men were later found, mutilated, by the Congo River. Massamba-Débat's regime invited some hundred Cuban army troops into the country to train his party's militia units. These troops helped his government survive a coup attempt in 1966 led by paratroopers loyal to future President Marien Ngouabi. Massamba-Débat's regime ended with a bloodless coup in September 1968.

Marien Ngouabi, who had participated in the coup, assumed the presidency on 31 December 1968. One year later, Ngouabi proclaimed the People's Republic of the Congo and announced the renaming of the National Revolutionary Movement to the Congolese Labour Party (PCT). He survived an attempted coup in 1972 and was assassinated on 18 March 1977. An 11-member Military Committee of the Party (CMP) was then named to head an interim government, with Joachim Yhombi-Opango serving as president. Two years later, Yhombi-Opango was forced from power, and Denis Sassou Nguesso became the new president.

Sassou Nguesso aligned the country with the Eastern Bloc and signed a 20-year friendship pact with the Soviet Union. Over the years, Sassou had to rely more on political repression and less on patronage to maintain his dictatorship. The collapse of the Soviet Union in 1991 resulted in the ending of Soviet aid to prop up the regime, and it abdicated power.

Pascal Lissouba who became Congo's first elected president (1992–1997) during the period of multi-party democracy attempted to implement economic reforms with IMF backing to liberalize the economy. In the years 1993 and 1994 the first Republic of the Congo Civil War occurred. In June 1996, IMF approved a three-year SDR 69.5m (US$100m) enhanced structural adjustment facility (ESAF) and was on the verge of announcing a renewed annual agreement when civil war broke out in Congo in 1997.

Congo's democratic progress was derailed in 1997 when Lissouba and Sassou started to fight for power in the civil war. As presidential elections scheduled for July 1997 approached, tensions between the Lissouba and Sassou camps mounted. On 5 June, President Lissouba's government forces surrounded Sassou's compound in Brazzaville, and Sassou ordered members of his private militia (known as "Cobras") to resist. This would begin a four-month conflict that destroyed some of Brazzaville's infrastructure and caused the deaths of tens of thousands of civilians. In October, the Angolan government began an invasion of Congo to install Sassou in power and the Lissouba government fell. After that, Sassou declared himself president.

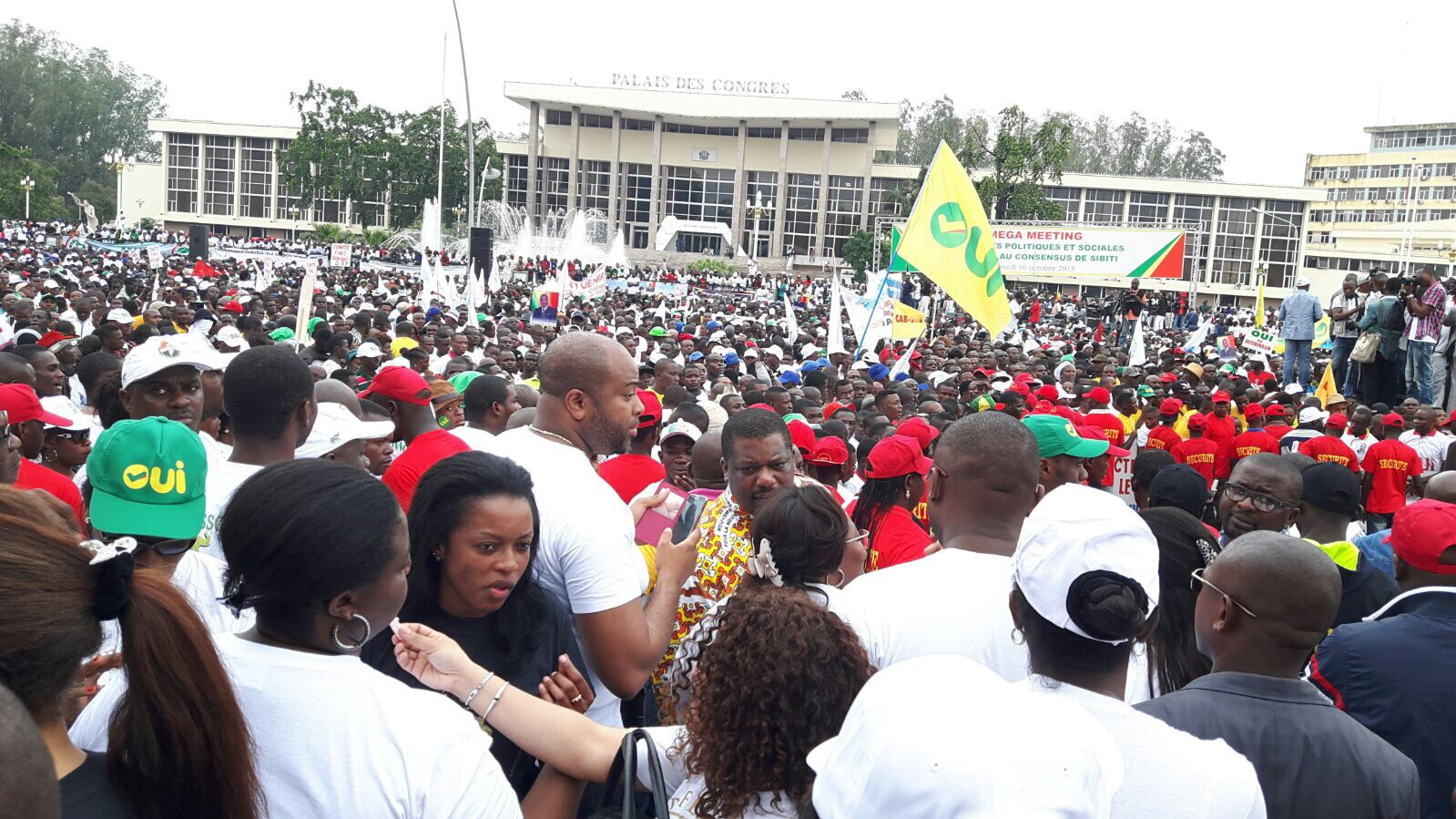
A pro-constitutional reform rally in Brazzaville during October 2015. The constitution's reforms were subsequently approved in a disputed election that saw demonstrations and violence.

In the elections in 2002, Sassou won with almost 90% of the vote cast. His two main rivals, Lissouba and Bernard Kolelas, were prevented from competing. A remaining rival, André Milongo advised his supporters to boycott the elections and then withdrew from the race. A constitution, agreed upon by referendum in January 2002, granted the president new powers, extended his term to seven years and introduced a new bicameral assembly. International observers took issue with the organization of the presidential election and the constitutional referendum, both of which were reminiscent in their organization of the Congo's period of one-party rule. Following the presidential elections, fighting restarted in the Pool region between government forces and rebels led by Pastor Ntumi; a peace treaty to end the conflict was signed in April 2003.

Sassou won the following presidential election in July 2009. According to the Congolese Observatory of Human Rights, a non-governmental organization, the election was marked by "very low" turnout and "fraud and irregularities". In March 2015, Sassou announced that he wanted to run for yet another term in office and a constitutional referendum in October resulted in a changed constitution that allowed him to run during the 2016 presidential election. He won the election which was believed by some to be fraudulent. After violent protests in the capital, Sassou attacked the Pool region where the Ninja rebels from the civil war were based, in what was believed to be a distraction. This led to a revival of the Ninja rebels who launched attacks against the army in April 2016, leading 80,000 people to flee their homes. A ceasefire deal was signed in December 2017.

In 2023, the Forest Massif of Odzala-Kokoua was listed as a natural UNESCO World Heritage Site.

== Geography ==
Natural landscapes range from the savanna plains in the North Niari flooded forests, to the Congo River, to the rugged mountains and forests of Mayombe, and 170 km of beaches along the Atlantic coast.

Climate diagram for Brazzaville

Congo is located in the central-western part of sub-Saharan Africa, along the Equator, lying between latitudes 4°N and 5°S, and longitudes 11° and 19°E. To the south and east of it is the Democratic Republic of the Congo. It is bounded by Gabon to the west, Cameroon and the Central African Republic to the north, and Cabinda (Angola) to the southwest. It has a coast on the Atlantic Ocean.

The southwest is a coastal plain for which the primary drainage is the Kouilou-Niari River; the interior of the country consists of a central plateau between 2 basins to the south and north. Forests are under increasing exploitation pressure. Congo had a 2018 Forest Landscape Integrity Index mean score of 8.89/10, ranking it 12th globally out of 172 countries.

Congo lies within four terrestrial ecoregions: Atlantic Equatorial coastal forests, Northwestern Congolian lowland forests, Western Congolian swamp forests, and Western Congolian forest–savanna mosaic. Since the country is located on the Equator, the climate is more consistent year-round, with the average day temperature a humid 24 °C (75 °F) and nights generally between 16 °C (61 °F) and 21 °C (70 °F). The average yearly rainfall ranges from 1,100 millimetres (43 in) in the Niari Valley in the south to over 2,000 millimetres (79 in) in central parts. The dry season is from June to August, while in the majority of the country, the wet season has 2 rainfall maxima: one in March–May and another in September–November.

In 2006–07, researchers from the Wildlife Conservation Society studied gorillas in "heavily forested" regions centered on the Ouesso District of the Sangha Region. They suggest a population on the order of 125,000 western lowland gorillas whose isolation from humans has been mostly preserved by "inhospitable" swamps.

== Government and politics ==
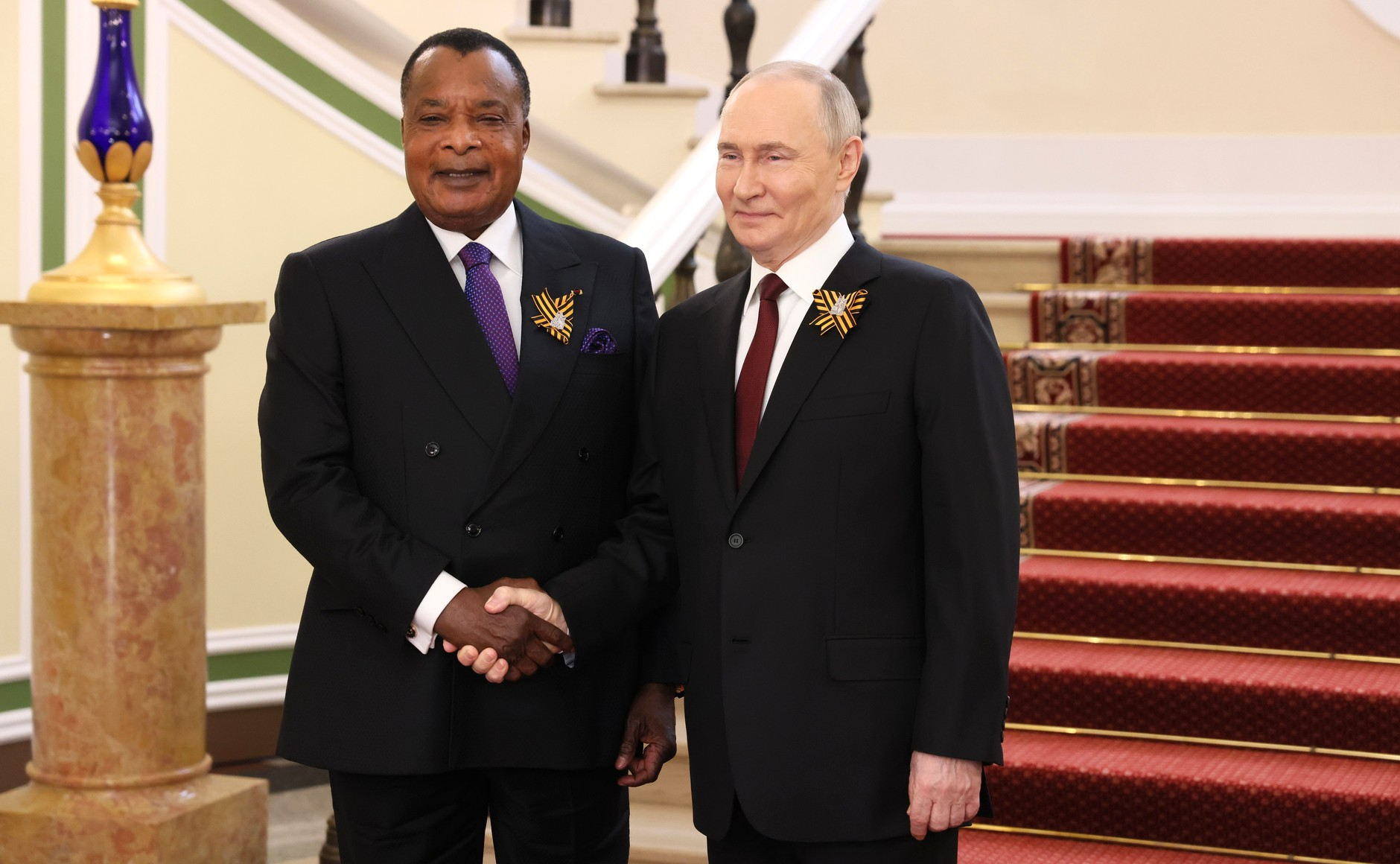
Congo's President Denis Sassou Nguesso with Russian President Vladimir Putin in Moscow, Russia, on 9 May 2025

The government of the republic is a semi-presidential system with an elected president who appoints the Council of Ministers, or Cabinet. The council, including the prime minister, is selected from the elected representatives in Parliament. Since the 1990s, the country has had a multi-party political system that is dominated by President Denis Sassou Nguesso. Sassou Nguesso is backed by his own Congolese Labour Party (French: Parti Congolais du Travail ) as well as a range of smaller parties.

Sassou's regime has seen corruption revelations, with attempts to censor them. One French investigation found over 110 bank accounts and dozens of "lavish properties" in France. Sassou denounced embezzlement investigations as "racist" and "colonial". Denis Christel Sassou-Nguesso, son of Denis Sassou Nguesso, has been named in association with the Panama Papers.

On 27 March 2015, Sassou Nguesso announced that his government would hold a referendum on changing the country's 2002 constitution to allow him to run for a third consecutive term in office. On 25 October, the government held a referendum on allowing Sassou Nguesso to run in the next election. The government claimed that the proposal was approved by 92% of voters, with 72% of eligible voters participating. The opposition who boycotted the referendum said that the government's statistics were false and the vote was a fake one. The election raised questions and was accompanied by civil unrest and police shootings of protesters; at least 18 people were killed by security forces during opposition rallies leading up to the referendum held in October.

=== Administrative divisions ===
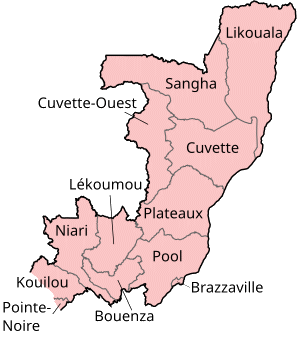
Map of the Republic of the Congo exhibiting its 12 departments

The republic has been divided into 15 departments since the adoption of the corresponding laws in October 2024. Departments are divided into communes and districts. These are as follows:

- Bouenza
- Brazzaville
- Congo-Oubangui
- Cuvette
- Cuvette-Ouest
- Djoué-Léfini
- Kouilou
- Lékoumou
- Likouala
- Niari
- Nkeni-Alima
- Plateaux
- Pointe-Noire
- Pool
- Sangha

=== Human rights ===
Some Pygmies belong from birth to Bantus in a relationship some refer to as slavery. The Congolese Human Rights Observatory says that the Pygmies are treated as property in the same way as pets. On 30 December 2010, the Congolese parliament adopted a law to promote and protect the rights of indigenous peoples. This law is "the first" of its kind in Africa.

== Economy ==
GDP per capita development, 1950 to 2018

The economy is a mixture of village agriculture and handicrafts, an industrial sector based mainly on petroleum, support services, and a government characterized by budget problems and "overstaffing". Petroleum extraction has supplanted forestry as the mainstay of the economy. In 2008, the oil sector accounted for 65% of the GDP, 85% of government revenue, and 92% of exports. The country has untapped mineral wealth.

In the 1980s, rising oil revenues enabled the government to finance larger-scale development projects. GDP grew an average of 5% annually. The government has mortgaged a portion of its petroleum earnings, contributing to a "shortage of revenues". On 12 January 1994, the devaluation of Franc Zone currencies by 50% resulted in an inflation of 46% in 1994, and inflation has subsided since.

Between 1994 and 1996, the economy underwent a difficult transition. The Congo took a number of measures to liberalize its economy, including reforming the tax, investment, labor, timber, and hydrocarbon codes. In 2002–03, Congo privatized banks, telecommunications, and transportation monopolies, to help improve an unreliable infrastructure. By the end of 1996 Congo had made progress in various areas targeted for reform. It made great strides toward macroeconomic stabilization through improving public finances and restructuring external debt. This change was accompanied by improvements in the structure of expenditures, with a reduction in personnel expenditures. Before June 1997, Congo and the United States ratified a bilateral investment treaty designed to facilitate and protect foreign investment. The country also adopted a new investment code intended to attract foreign capital. Despite these success, Congo's investment climate has challenges, offering few meaningful incentives for new investors.

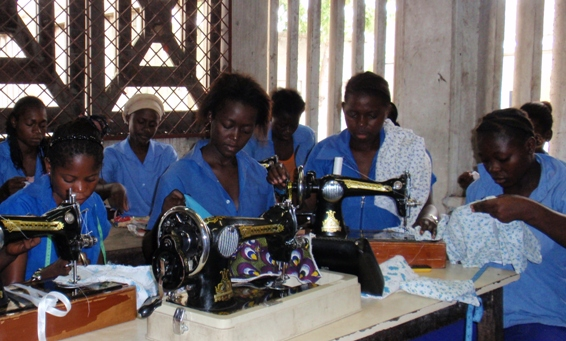
Women learning to sew, Brazzaville

Economic reform efforts continued with the support of international organizations, including the World Bank and the International Monetary Fund. The reform program came to a halt in June 1997 when civil war erupted. When Sassou Nguesso returned to power in October 1997, he publicly expressed interest in moving forward on economic reforms and privatization and in renewing cooperation with international financial institutions. Economic progress was "badly hurt" by slumping oil prices and the resumption of armed conflict in December 1998, which "worsened" the republic's budget deficit.

The administration presides over an "uneasy internal peace" and faces "difficult" economic problems of stimulating recovery and reducing poverty, with record-high oil prices since 2003. Natural gas and diamonds are other exports, while Congo was excluded from the Kimberley Process in 2004 amid allegations that most of its diamond exports were, in fact, being smuggled out of the neighboring Democratic Republic of the Congo; it was re-admitted to the group in 2007.

The Republic of the Congo has untapped base metal, gold, iron, and phosphate deposits. It is a member of the Organization for the Harmonization of Business Law in Africa (OHADA). The Congolese government signed an agreement in 2009 to lease 200,000 hectares of land to South African farmers to reduce its dependence on imports. The GDP of the Republic of the Congo grew by 6% in 2014 and is expected to have grown by 7.5% in 2015.

In 2018, the Republic of the Congo joined the Organization of Petroleum Exporting Countries.

Congo–Ocean Railway was built by forced laborers during the 1930s. Some colonial architectural heritage is preserved. Restoration of architectural works is underway in Brazzaville, for example, at the Basilica of Sainte-Anne du Congo, which was completed in 2011.

== Demographics ==
Population
| Year | Million |
|---|---|
| 1950 | 0.8 |
| 2000 | 3.2 |
| 2021 | 5.8 |

According to the official 2023 census, the population of the Congo numbers 6,142,180 people, up from 3,697,490 recorded by the 2007 census. Its population is concentrated in the southwestern portion, leaving the areas of tropical jungle in the north virtually uninhabited. 70% of its total population lives in urban areas, namely in Brazzaville, Pointe-Noire, or one of the cities or villages lining the 534-kilometre (332 mi), railway which connects the two cities. In rural areas, industrial and commercial activity has declined in some years, leaving rural economies dependent on the government for support and subsistence.

Before the 1997 war, about 9,000 Europeans and other non-Africans lived in Congo, most of whom were French; a fraction of this number remains. Around 300 American immigrants reside in the Congo.

The government 2025 demographic and health survey (DHS) reported the total fertility rate had declined to 3.5 children born per woman, with a rate of 3.0 in urban areas and 5.3 in rural areas. The 2011–12 DHS found the TFR was 5.1 children born per woman, with 4.5 in urban areas and 6.5 in rural areas.

=== Largest cities ===
Largest cities or towns in Republic of the Congo (2023 census)
| Rank | | Department | Pop. |
|---|---|---|---|
| 1 | Brazzaville | Brazzaville | 2,138,236 |
| 2 | Pointe-Noire | Pointe-Noire | 1,398,812 |
| 3 | Dolisie | Niari | 178,172 |
| 4 | Nkayi | Bouenza | 104,083 |
| 5 | Ouésso | Sangha | 75,095 |
| 6 | Kintélé | Pool | 71,629 |
| 7 | Oyo | Cuvette | 63,598 |
| 8 | Bétou | Likouala | 59,563 |
| 9 | Gamboma | Plateaux | 52,652 |
| 10 | Owando | Cuvette | 48,642 |

=== Languages ===
French is the official language of the Republic of the Congo. Kituba and Lingala are recognized as national languages. In addition, Ethnologue recognizes 62 spoken languages in the country. The Kongo are the largest ethnic group and form roughly half of the population. The most significant subgroups of the Kongo are Laari, in Brazzaville and Pool regions, and the Vili, around Pointe-Noire and along the Atlantic coast. The second largest group is the Teke, who live to the north of Brazzaville, with 16.9% of the population. Mbochi live in the north, east and in Brazzaville and form 13.1% of the population. Pygmies make up 2% of Congo's population.

=== Religion ===
Religion in the Republic of the Congo by the Association of Religion Data Archives (2015)
1. Catholic (52.9%)
2. Protestant and other Christian (35.6%)
3. Traditional African religions (4.70%)
4. Other religions (2.30%)
5. No religion (3.00%)
6. Don't know (1.40%)

According to CIA World Factbook, the people of the Republic of the Congo are largely a mix of Catholics (33.1%), adherents of Awakening Churches and Christian Revivalism (22.3%), and other Protestants (19.9%) as of 2007. Followers of Islam make up 1.6%; this is primarily due to an influx of foreign workers into the urban centers.

=== Education ===
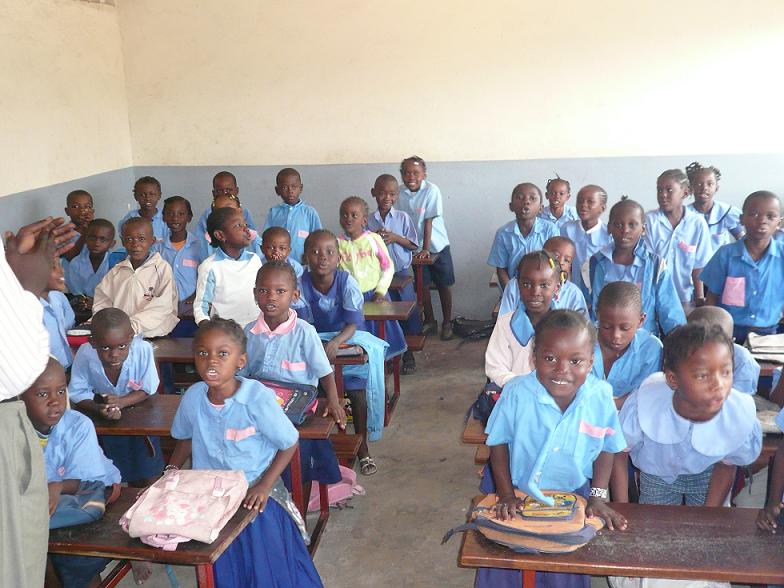
School children in the classroom, Republic of the Congo

Public expenditure of the GDP was less in 2002–05 than in 1991. Public education is theoretically free and mandatory for under-16-year-olds but in practice educational expenses must be borne by parents. In 2005 the net primary enrollment rate was 44%, a drop from 79% in 1991. The investment in education has significantly dropped in recent years, leading to a dip in quality. In 2018, the school completion rate was 66% for girls and 64% for boys. Although the government has made attempts to provide Vocational training and tertiary education, they remain poor and inaccessible to most young adults in the country.

=== Health ===
Public expenditure health was at 8.9% of the GDP in 2004 whereas private expenditure was at 1.3%. As of 2012, the HIV/AIDS prevalence was at 2.8% among 15- to 49-year-olds. Health expenditure was at US$30 per capita in 2004. A proportion of the population is undernourished, and malnutrition is a problem in Congo. There were 20 physicians per 100,000 persons in the 2000s (decade).

As of 2010, the maternal mortality rate was 560 deaths/100,000 live births, and the infant mortality rate was 59.34 deaths/1,000 live births. Female genital mutilation (FGM) is confined to limited geographic areas.

== Culture ==
=== Media ===
Rural Congolese often receive their news via state-run radio; broadcast media is the main source of news for the majority of Congolese. Government-owned and private media are usually pro-government. Programs are broadcast in a variety of languages. Print media is often circulated in Brazzaville and Pointe-Noire. Important news papers include Le Choc, Les Echos du Congo, L'Observateur, and La Semaine Africaine.

=== Sports ===
The most popular sports in the country are basketball, football, rugby union, volleyball, and tennis. Basketball and football are extremely popular amongst the Congolese youth.

== See also ==
- List of people from the Republic of the Congo
- Outline of the Republic of the Congo – Overview of and topical guide to the Republic of the Congo
