= Outline of the Republic of the Congo =

Overview of and topical guide to the Republic of the Congo

The Flag of the Republic of the Congo

The Coat of arms of the Republic of the Congo

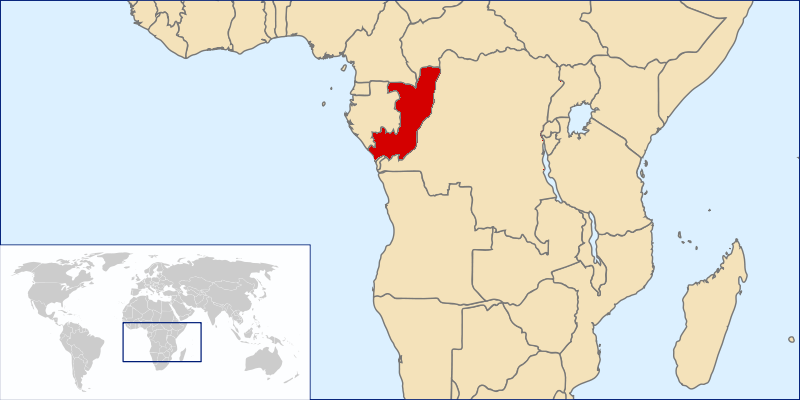
The location of the Republic of the Congo

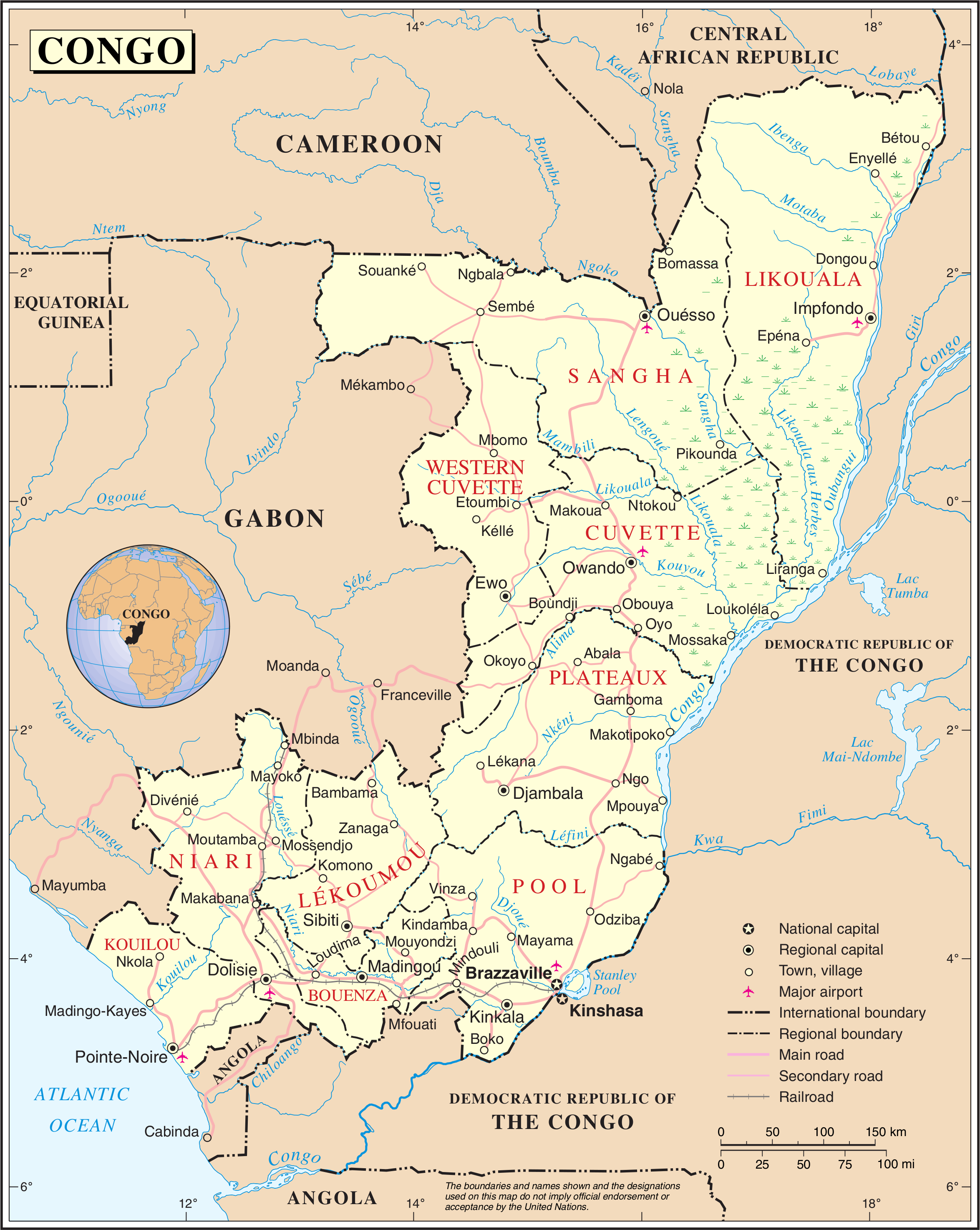
An enlargeable map of the Republic of the Congo

The following outline is provided as an overview of and topical guide to the Republic of the Congo:

Republic of the Congo – also known as Congo-Brazzaville or the Congo, is a sovereign country located in Central Africa. It is bordered by Gabon, Cameroon, the Central African Republic, the Democratic Republic of the Congo, the Angolan exclave province of Cabinda, and the Gulf of Guinea.

The republic is a former French colony. Upon independence in 1960, the former French region of Middle Congo became the Republic of the Congo. After a quarter century of Marxism, Congo became a multi-party democracy in 1992. However, a brief civil war in 1997 ended in the restoration of former Marxist President Denis Sassou Nguesso to power.

== General reference ==
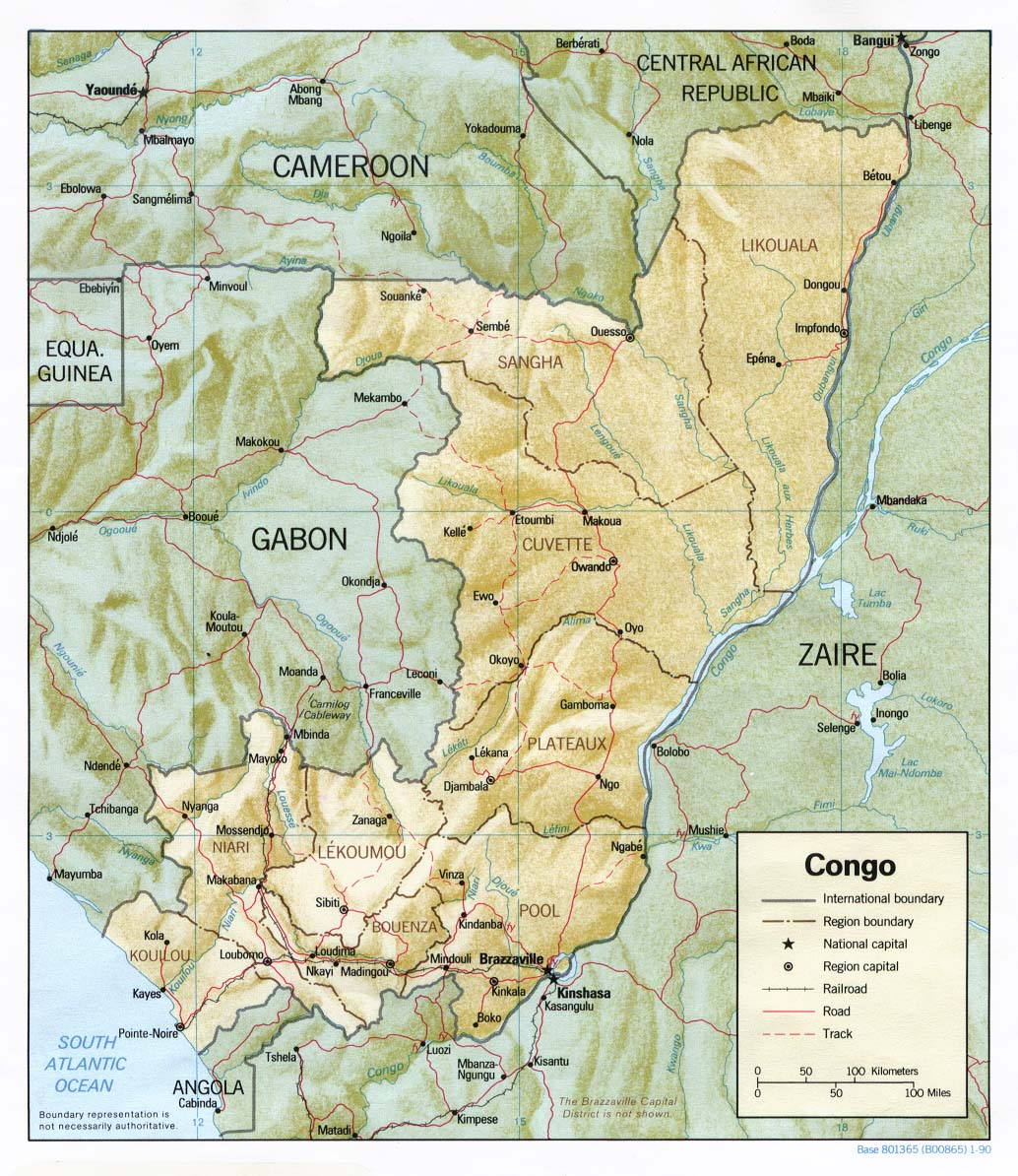
An enlargeable relief map of the Republic of the Congo

- Pronunciation: /ˈkɒŋɡoʊ/
- Common English country names: (The) Republic of the Congo, Congo-Brazzaville or Congo (Congo being ambiguous with Democratic Republic of the Congo)
- Official English country name: (The) Republic of the Congo
- Adjectives: Congolese, Congo
- Demonym(s): Congolese
- International rankings of the Republic of the Congo
- ISO country codes: CG, COG, 178
- ISO region codes: See ISO 3166-2:CG
- Internet country code top-level domain: .cg

== Geography of the Republic of the Congo ==
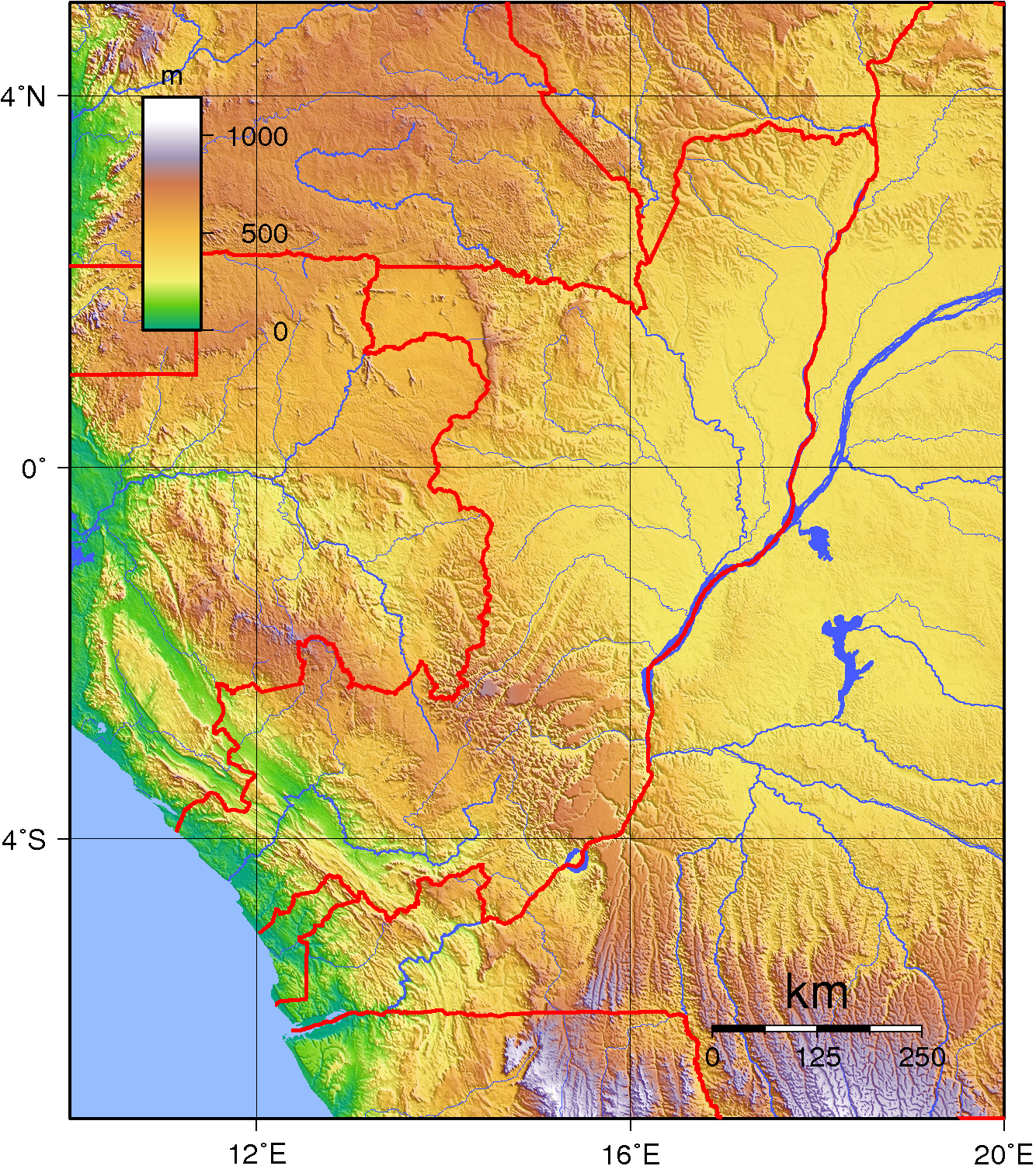
An enlargeable topographic map of the Republic of the Congo

Geography of the Republic of the Congo

- The Republic of the Congo is: a country
- Location:
  - Eastern Hemisphere, on the Equator
  - Africa
    - Middle Africa
  - Time zone: UTC+01
    - Time in the Republic of the Congo
  - Extreme points of the Republic of the Congo
    - High: Mont Nabeba 1,020 m (3,346 ft)
    - Low: South Atlantic Ocean 0 m
  - Land boundaries: 5,504 km

Democratic Republic of the Congo 2,410 km
Gabon 1,903 km
Cameroon 523 km
Central African Republic 467 km
- Central African Republic–Republic of the Congo border
Angola (Cabinda Province) 201 km
- Angola–Republic of the Congo border

- Coastline: Gulf of Guinea 169 km

- Atlas of the Republic of the Congo

=== Environment of the Republic of the Congo ===
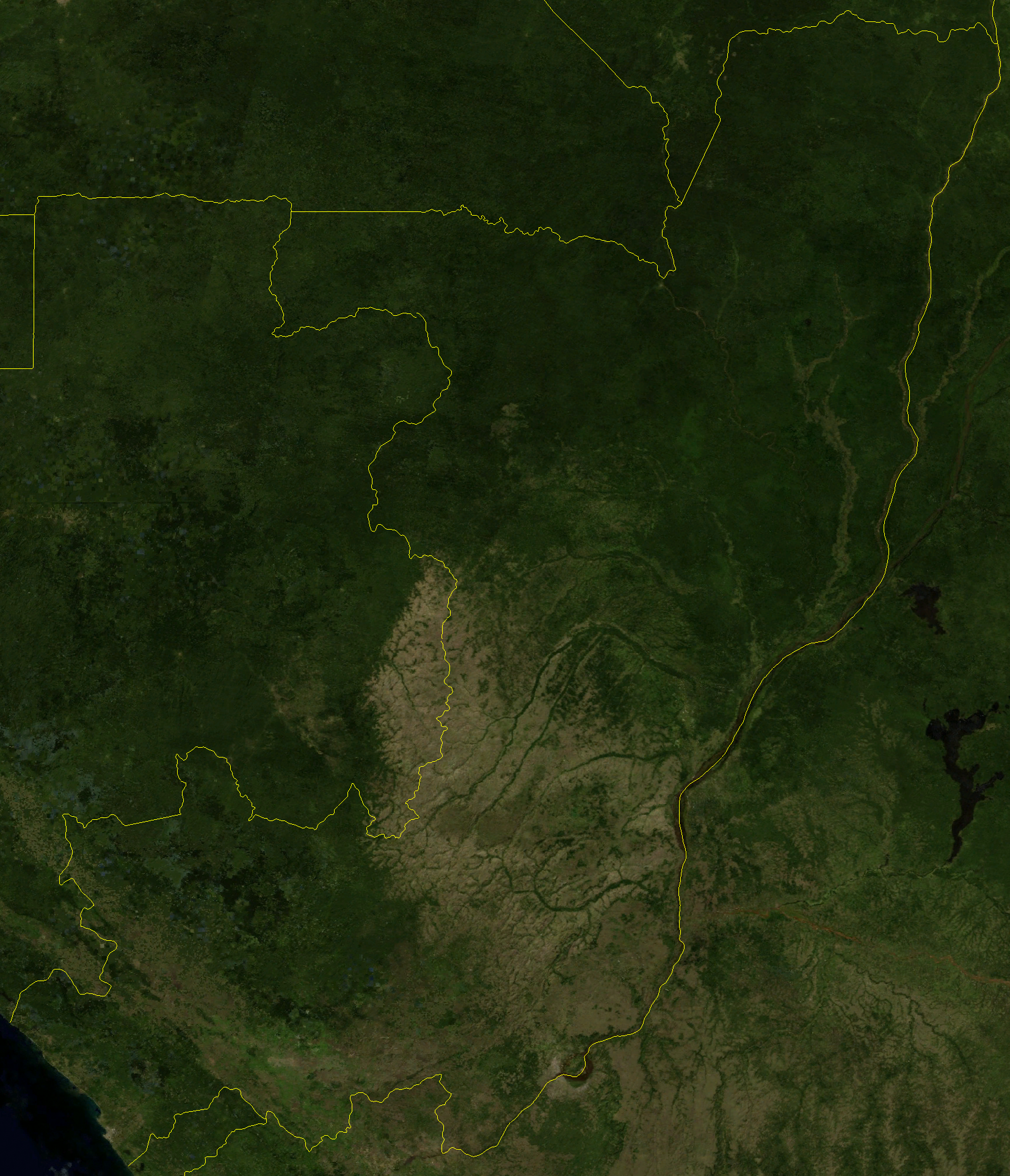
An enlargeable satellite image of the Republic of the Congo

- Climate of the Republic of the Congo
- Ecoregions in the Republic of the Congo
- Geology of the Republic of the Congo
- Wildlife of the Republic of the Congo
  - Fauna of the Republic of the Congo
    - Birds of the Republic of the Congo
    - Mammals of the Republic of the Congo
    - Insects of the Republic of the Congo
      - Butterflies of the Republic of the Congo
      - Moths of the Republic of the Congo

==== Natural geographic features of the Republic of the Congo ====
- Glaciers in the Republic of the Congo: none
- Rivers of the Republic of the Congo
- World Heritage Sites in the Republic of the Congo: None

=== Regions in the Republic of the Congo ===
==== Ecoregions of the Republic of the Congo ====
List of ecoregions in the Republic of the Congo

- Ecoregions in the Republic of the Congo

==== Administrative divisions of the Republic of the Congo ====
===== Departments of the Republic of the Congo =====
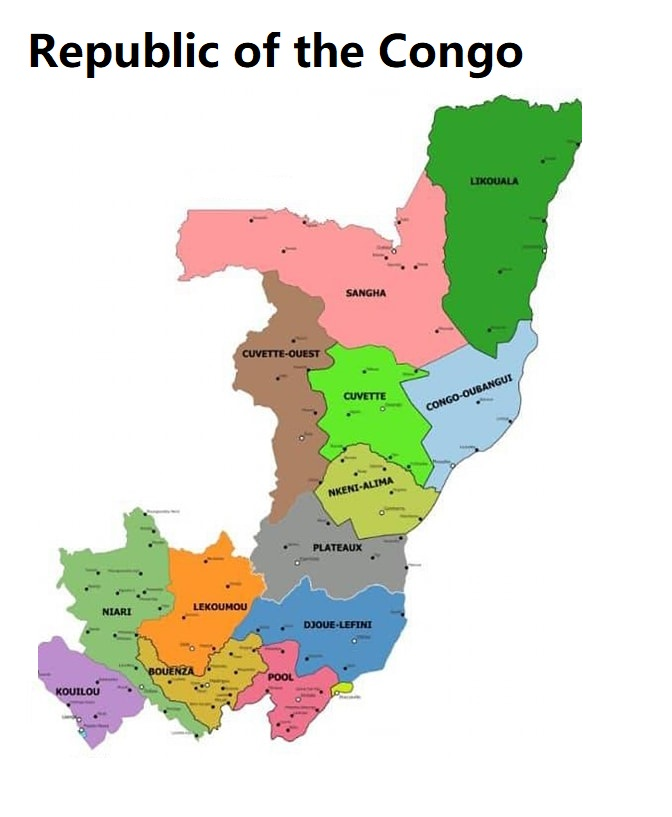

#	Department Name
1	Bouenza
2	Brazzaville
3	Cuvette
4	Cuvette-Ouest
5	Kouilou
6	Lékoumou
7	Likouala
8	Niari
9	Plateaux
10	Pointe-Noire
11	Pool
12	Sangha

Districts of the Republic of Congo

===== Communes of the Republic of the Congo =====
- Capital of the Republic of the Congo: Brazzaville
- Cities of the Republic of the Congo

=== Demography of the Republic of the Congo ===
Demographics of the Republic of the Congo

== Government and politics of the Republic of the Congo ==
- Politics of the Republic of the Congo
  - Form of government: unitary semi-presidential republic
  - Capital of the Republic of the Congo: Brazzaville
  - Political parties in the Republic of the Congo

=== Elections in the Republic of the Congo ===
Elections in the Republic of the Congo

- 2008 Republic of the Congo Senate election
- Parliamentary elections in the Republic of the Congo
  - 1959 Republic of the Congo parliamentary election
  - 1963 Republic of the Congo parliamentary election
  - 1973 People's Republic of the Congo parliamentary election
  - 1979 People's Republic of the Congo parliamentary election
  - 1984 People's Republic of the Congo parliamentary election
  - 1989 People's Republic of the Congo parliamentary election
  - 1992 Republic of the Congo parliamentary election
  - 1993 Republic of the Congo parliamentary election
  - 2002 Republic of the Congo parliamentary election
  - 2007 Republic of the Congo parliamentary election
  - 2012 Republic of the Congo parliamentary election
  - 2017 Republic of the Congo parliamentary election
  - 2022 Republic of the Congo parliamentary election
- Presidential elections in the Republic of the Congo
  - 1961 Republic of the Congo presidential election
  - 1963 Republic of the Congo presidential election
  - 1992 Republic of the Congo presidential election
  - 2002 Republic of the Congo presidential election
  - 2009 Republic of the Congo presidential election
  - 2016 Republic of the Congo presidential election
  - 2021 Republic of the Congo presidential election

=== Branches of the government of the Republic of the Congo ===
- Government of the Republic of the Congo

==== Executive branch of the government of the Republic of the Congo ====
- Head of state: President of the Republic of the Congo, Denis Sassou Nguesso
  - First Lady of the Republic of the Congo
  - Vice President of the Republic of the Congo
- Head of government: Prime Minister of the Republic of the Congo, Anatole Collinet Makosso
- Cabinet of the Republic of the Congo

==== Legislative branch of the government of the Republic of the Congo ====
- Parliament of the Republic of the Congo (bicameral)
  - Upper house: Senate
    - presidents of the Senate of the Republic of the Congo
  - Lower house: National Assembly
    - Presidents of the National Assembly of the Republic of the Congo

==== Judicial branch of the government of the Republic of the Congo ====
- Court system of the Republic of the Congo

=== Foreign relations of the Republic of the Congo ===
- Foreign relations of the Republic of the Congo
  - Republic of the Congo passport
  - Diplomatic missions in the Republic of the Congo
  - Diplomatic missions of the Republic of the Congo
  - Apostolic Nunciature to the Republic of the Congo
  - China–Republic of the Congo relations
  - East Germany–People's Republic of the Congo relations
  - Republic of the Congo–France relations
  - Republic of the Congo–Holy See relations
  - Republic of the Congo–Russia relations
  - Republic of the Congo–South Africa relations
  - Republic of the Congo–Turkey relations
  - Republic of the Congo–United States relations
    - Ambassadors of the Republic of the Congo to the United States
    - Ambassadors of the United States to the Republic of the Congo
  - Republic of the Congo–Yugoslavia relations

==== International organization membership ====
The Republic of the Congo is a member of:

- African, Caribbean, and Pacific Group of States (ACP)
- African Development Bank Group (AfDB)
- African Union (AU)
- Conference des Ministres des Finances des Pays de la Zone Franc (FZ)
- Development Bank of Central African States (BDEAC)
- Economic and Monetary Community of Central Africa (CEMAC)
- Food and Agriculture Organization (FAO)
- Group of 77 (G77)
- International Bank for Reconstruction and Development (IBRD)
- International Civil Aviation Organization (ICAO)
- International Criminal Court (ICCt)
- International Criminal Police Organization (Interpol)
- International Development Association (IDA)
- International Federation of Red Cross and Red Crescent Societies (IFRCS)
- International Finance Corporation (IFC)
- International Fund for Agricultural Development (IFAD)
- International Labour Organization (ILO)
- International Maritime Organization (IMO)
- International Monetary Fund (IMF)
- International Olympic Committee (IOC)
- International Organization for Migration (IOM)
- International Telecommunication Union (ITU)
- International Telecommunications Satellite Organization (ITSO)
- International Trade Union Confederation (ITUC)
- Inter-Parliamentary Union (IPU)
- Multilateral Investment Guarantee Agency (MIGA)
- Nonaligned Movement (NAM)
- Organisation internationale de la Francophonie (OIF)
- Organisation for the Prohibition of Chemical Weapons (OPCW)
- United Nations (UN)
- United Nations Conference on Trade and Development (UNCTAD)
- United Nations Educational, Scientific, and Cultural Organization (UNESCO)
- United Nations Industrial Development Organization (UNIDO)
- United Nations Institute for Training and Research (UNITAR)
- Universal Postal Union (UPU)
- World Confederation of Labour (WCL)
- World Customs Organization (WCO)
- World Federation of Trade Unions (WFTU)
- World Health Organization (WHO)
- World Intellectual Property Organization (WIPO)
- World Meteorological Organization (WMO)
- World Tourism Organization (UNWTO)
- World Trade Organization (WTO)

=== Law and order in the Republic of the Congo ===
- Crime in the Republic of the Congo
  - Human trafficking in the Republic of the Congo
    - Child marriage in Republic of the Congo
- Law of the Republic of the Congo
  - Capital punishment in the Republic of the Congo
  - Constitution of the Republic of the Congo
    - 1963 Republic of the Congo constitutional referendum
    - 1973 Republic of the Congo constitutional referendum
    - 1979 Republic of the Congo constitutional referendum
    - 1992 Republic of the Congo constitutional referendum
    - 2002 Republic of the Congo constitutional referendum
    - 2015 Republic of the Congo constitutional referendum
  - Election law of the Republic of the Congo
  - Human rights in the Republic of the Congo
    - LGBT rights in the Republic of the Congo
    - Freedom of religion in the Republic of the Congo
  - Marriage in the Republic of the Congo
    - Child marriage in Republic of the Congo
    - Polygamy in the Republic of the Congo
  - Visa policy of the Republic of the Congo
    - Visa requirements for Republic of the Congo citizens
- Law enforcement in the Republic of the Congo
  - Capital punishment in the Republic of the Congo

=== Armed Forces of the Republic of the Congo ===
- Armed Forces of the Republic of the Congo
  - Command
    - Commander-in-chief:
    - Military ranks of Republic of the Congo
  - Forces
    - Army of the Republic of the Congo
    - Air Force of the Republic of the Congo

=== Local government in the Republic of the Congo ===
- Local government in the Republic of the Congo

== History of the Republic of the Congo ==
=== History of the Republic of the Congo, by period ===
- Kingdom of Kongo (1390–1914)
- Kingdom of Loango (1550–1883)
- Kongo Civil War (1665–1709)
- Colonization of the Congo Basin (1876–1885)
- Atlantic slave trade
- French Congo (1882–1910)
- French Equatorial Africa (1910–1958)
- Fulbert Youlou
- Trois Glorieuses (1963)
- 1966 Republic of the Congo coup d'état attempt
- 1968 Republic of the Congo coup d'état
- People's Republic of the Congo (1970–1992)
  - 1972 Republic of the Congo coup d'état attempt
  - 1987 Republic of the Congo coup d'état attempt
- 1990s in the Republic of the Congo
  - First Civil War (1993–1994)
  - Second Civil War (1997–1999)
- 2002 Republic of the Congo constitutional referendum
- 2002–2003 conflict in the Pool Department
- 2015 Republic of the Congo constitutional referendum
- Pool War (2016–2017)
- COVID-19 pandemic in the Republic of the Congo (2019–)

==== History of the Republic of the Congo, by year ====
- List of years in Republic of the Congo
  - 1990s in the Republic of the Congo
  - 1998 in the Republic of the Congo
  - 2017 in the Republic of the Congo
  - 2018 in the Republic of the Congo
  - 2020 in the Republic of the Congo
  - 2021 in the Republic of the Congo
  - 2022 in the Republic of the Congo

=== History of the Republic of the Congo, by subject ===
- Wars involving the Republic of the Congo

== Culture of the Republic of the Congo ==
- Cuisine of the Republic of the Congo
- Languages of the Republic of the Congo
- Media in the Republic of the Congo
- Museums in the Republic of the Congo
- National symbols of the Republic of the Congo
  - Coat of arms of the Republic of the Congo
  - Flag of the Republic of the Congo
  - National anthem of the Republic of the Congo
- People of the Republic of the Congo
  - Persons from the Republic of the Congo
    - Republic of the Congo writers
- Public holidays in the Republic of the Congo
- Scouting and Guiding in the Republic of the Congo
- Time in the Republic of the Congo
- World Heritage Sites in the Republic of the Congo: None

=== Art in the Republic of the Congo ===
- Cinema of the Republic of the Congo
  - Republic of the Congo films
- Music of the Republic of the Congo

=== Religion in the Republic of the Congo ===
Religion in the Republic of the Congo

- Christianity in the Republic of the Congo
  - Catholic Church in the Republic of the Congo
    - Apostolic Nunciature to the Republic of the Congo
    - Cathedrals in the Republic of the Congo
    - Catholic dioceses in the Republic of the Congo
  - The Church of Jesus Christ of Latter-day Saints in the Republic of the Congo
- Hinduism in the Republic of the Congo
- Islam in the Republic of the Congo

=== Sports in the Republic of the Congo ===
- Athletics in the Republic of the Congo
  - Republic of the Congo records in athletics
- Basketball in the Republic of the Congo
  - Republic of the Congo men's national basketball team
  - Republic of the Congo men's national under-16 basketball team
  - Republic of the Congo men's national under-18 basketball team
  - Republic of the Congo women's national basketball team
- Football in the Republic of the Congo
  - Football clubs in the Republic of the Congo
- Republic of the Congo at the African Games
  - Republic of the Congo at the 2019 African Games
- Republic of the Congo at the Paralympics
  - Republic of the Congo at the 2016 Summer Paralympics
- Republic of the Congo at the World Aquatics Championships
  - Republic of the Congo at the 2011 World Aquatics Championships
  - Republic of the Congo at the 2013 World Aquatics Championships
  - Republic of the Congo at the 2015 World Aquatics Championships
- Republic of the Congo at the World Championships in Athletics
  - Republic of the Congo at the 2009 World Championships in Athletics
  - Republic of the Congo at the 2011 World Championships in Athletics
  - Republic of the Congo at the 2013 World Championships in Athletics
  - Republic of the Congo at the 2015 World Championships in Athletics
  - Republic of the Congo at the 2017 World Championships in Athletics
  - Republic of the Congo at the 2019 World Athletics Championships
- Rugby union in the Republic of the Congo
  - Republic of the Congo national rugby union team
- Swimming in the Rupublic of the Congo
  - Republic of the Congo records in swimming
- Volleyball in the Republic of the Congo
  - Republic of the Congo women's national volleyball team

==== Republic of the Congo at the Olympics ====
Republic of the Congo at the Olympics

- Flag bearers for the Republic of the Congo at the Olympics
- Republic of the Congo at the Summer Olympics
  - Republic of the Congo at the 1964 Summer Olympics
  - Republic of the Congo at the 1972 Summer Olympics
  - Republic of the Congo at the 1980 Summer Olympics
  - Republic of the Congo at the 1984 Summer Olympics
  - Republic of the Congo at the 1988 Summer Olympics
  - Republic of the Congo at the 1992 Summer Olympics
  - Republic of the Congo at the 1996 Summer Olympics
  - Republic of the Congo at the 2000 Summer Olympics
  - Republic of the Congo at the 2004 Summer Olympics
  - Republic of the Congo at the 2008 Summer Olympics
  - Republic of the Congo at the 2012 Summer Olympics
  - Republic of the Congo at the 2016 Summer Olympics
  - Republic of the Congo at the 2020 Summer Olympics
- Republic of the Congo at the Summer Youth Olympics
  - Republic of the Congo at the 2010 Summer Youth Olympics
  - Republic of the Congo at the 2014 Summer Youth Olympics
  - Republic of the Congo at the 2018 Summer Youth Olympics

== Economy and infrastructure of the Republic of the Congo ==
- Economic rank, by nominal GDP (2007): 122nd (one hundred and twenty second)
- Agriculture in the Republic of the Congo
  - Cassava production in the Republic of the Congo
  - Cannabis in the Republic of the Congo
- Banking in the Republic of the Congo
  - Banks in the Republic of the Congo
- Buildings and structures in the Republic of the Congo
  - Bridges in the Republic of the Congo
  - Museums in the Republic of the Congo
  - Lighthouses in the Republic of the Congo
- Communications in the Republic of the Congo
  - Mass media in the Republic of the Congo
  - Postal system in the Republic of the Congo
    - Postage stamps and postal history of the Republic of the Congo
  - Telecommunications in the Republic of the Congo
    - Internet in the Republic of the Congo
    - Telephone numbers in the Republic of the Congo
- Companies of the Republic of the Congo
- Currency of the Republic of Congo: Franc
  - ISO 4217: XAF
- Energy in the Republic of the Congo
  - Petroleum industry in the Republic of the Congo
  - Power stations in the Republic of the Congo
- Health care in the Republic of the Congo
- Mining in the Republic of the Congo
- Transport in the Republic of the Congo
  - Air transport in the Republic of the Congo
    - Agence nationale de l'aviation civile (Republic of the Congo)
    - Airlines of the Republic of the Congo
      - Defunct airlines of the Republic of the Congo
    - Airports in the Republic of the Congo
- Maritime transport in the Republic of the Congo
  - Lighthouses in the Republic of the Congo
- Rail transport in the Republic of the Congo
  - Railway stations in the Republic of the Congo
- Road transport in the Republic of the Congo
  - Bridges in the Republic of the Congo
  - Vehicle registration plates of the Republic of the Congo

== Education in the Republic of the Congo ==
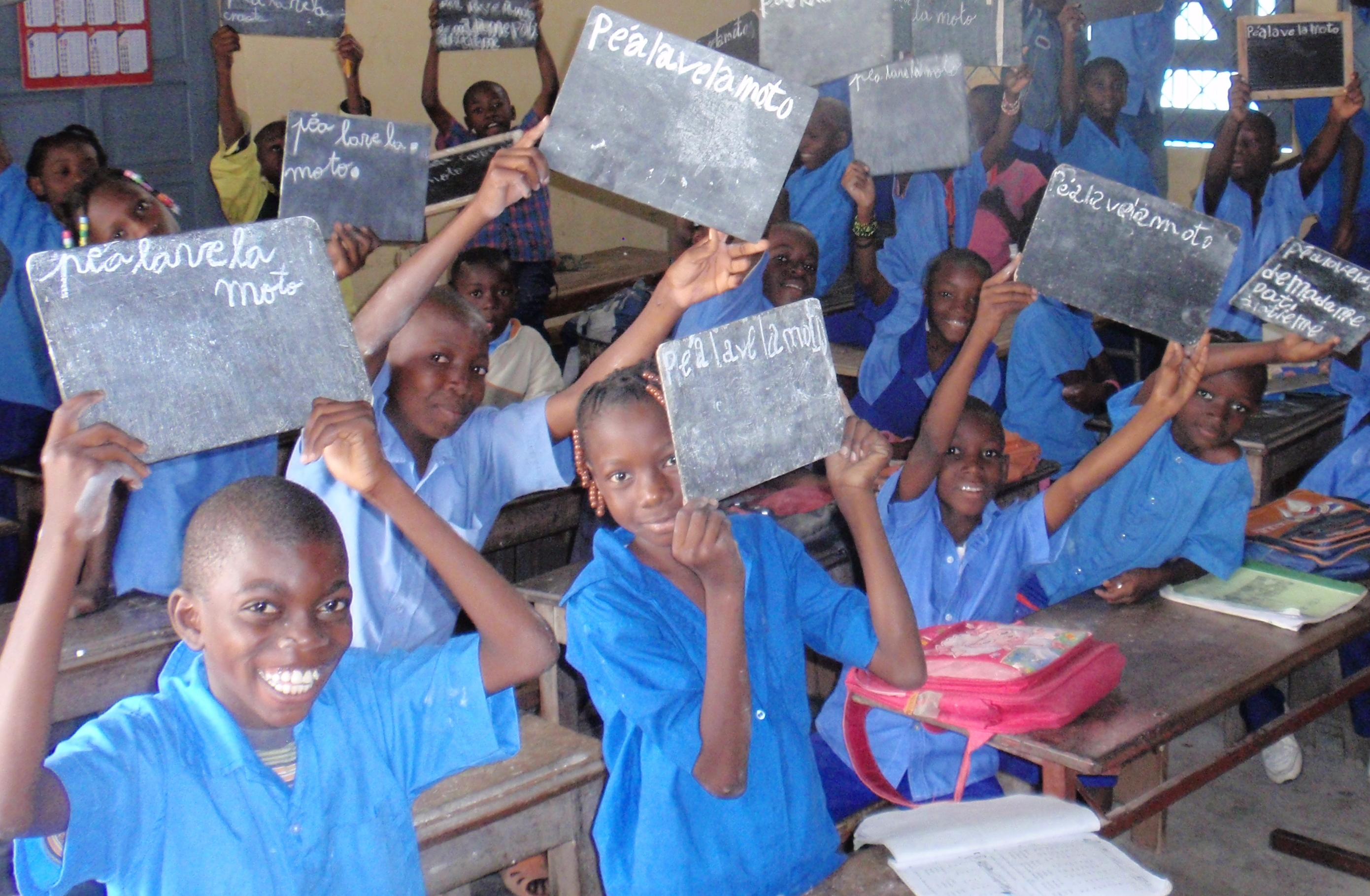

- Universities in the Republic of the Congo

== Health in the Republic of the Congo ==
- COVID-19 pandemic in the Republic of the Congo

== See also ==
Republic of the Congo

- List of Republic of the Congo-related topics
- All pages with titles beginning with Republic of the Congo
- All pages with titles beginning with Congo
- All pages with titles beginning with Congo-Brazzaville
- All pages with titles containing Republic of the Congo
- All pages with titles containing Congo
- All pages with titles containing Congo-Brazzaville
- List of international rankings
- Member state of the United Nations
- Outline of Africa
- Outline of geography
