= Angola–Congo border =

Angola–Congo border may refer to:

- Angola–Democratic Republic of the Congo border
- Angola–Republic of the Congo border.
