= List of companies of the Republic of the Congo =

Location of Republic of the Congo

The Republic of the Congo is a country located in Central Africa. It is bordered by Gabon, Cameroon, the Central African Republic, the Democratic Republic of the Congo and the Angolan exclave of Cabinda. In the early 1980s, rapidly rising oil revenues enabled the government to finance large-scale development projects with GDP growth averaging 5% annually, one of the highest rates in Africa. The government has mortgaged a substantial portion of its petroleum earnings, contributing to a shortage of revenues. The January 12, 1994 devaluation of Franc Zone currencies by 50% resulted in inflation of 46% in 1994, but inflation has subsided since.

== Notable firms ==
This list includes notable companies with primary headquarters located in the country. The industry and sector follow the Industry Classification Benchmark taxonomy. Organizations which have ceased operations are included and noted as defunct.

Notable companies Status: P=Private, S=State; A=Active, D=Defunct
Name	Industry	Sector	Headquarters	Founded	Notes	Status	
Aéro-Service	Consumer services	Airlines	Pointe-Noire	1967	Airline	P	A
Canadian Airways Congo	Consumer services	Airlines	Brazzaville	2004	Airline	P	A
Development Bank of the Central African States	Financials	Banks	Brazzaville	1975	Development bank	S	A
Equaflight	Consumer services	Airlines	Pointe-Noire	1998	Airline	P	A
Equatorial Congo Airlines	Consumer services	Airlines	Brazzaville	2011	Airline, defunct 2016	P	D
Lina Congo	Consumer services	Airlines	Pointe-Noire	1961	Airline, defunct 2002	P	D
Mistral Aviation	Consumer services	Airlines	Brazzaville	2006	Airline	P	A
Société Nationale des Pétroles du Congo	Oil & gas	Exploration & production	Pointe-Noire	1998	State oil & gas	S	A
Trans Air Congo	Consumer services	Airlines	Pointe-Noire	1994	Airline	P	A
Warid Congo	Telecommunications	Mobile telecommunications	Brazzaville	2008	GSM mobile provider	P	A

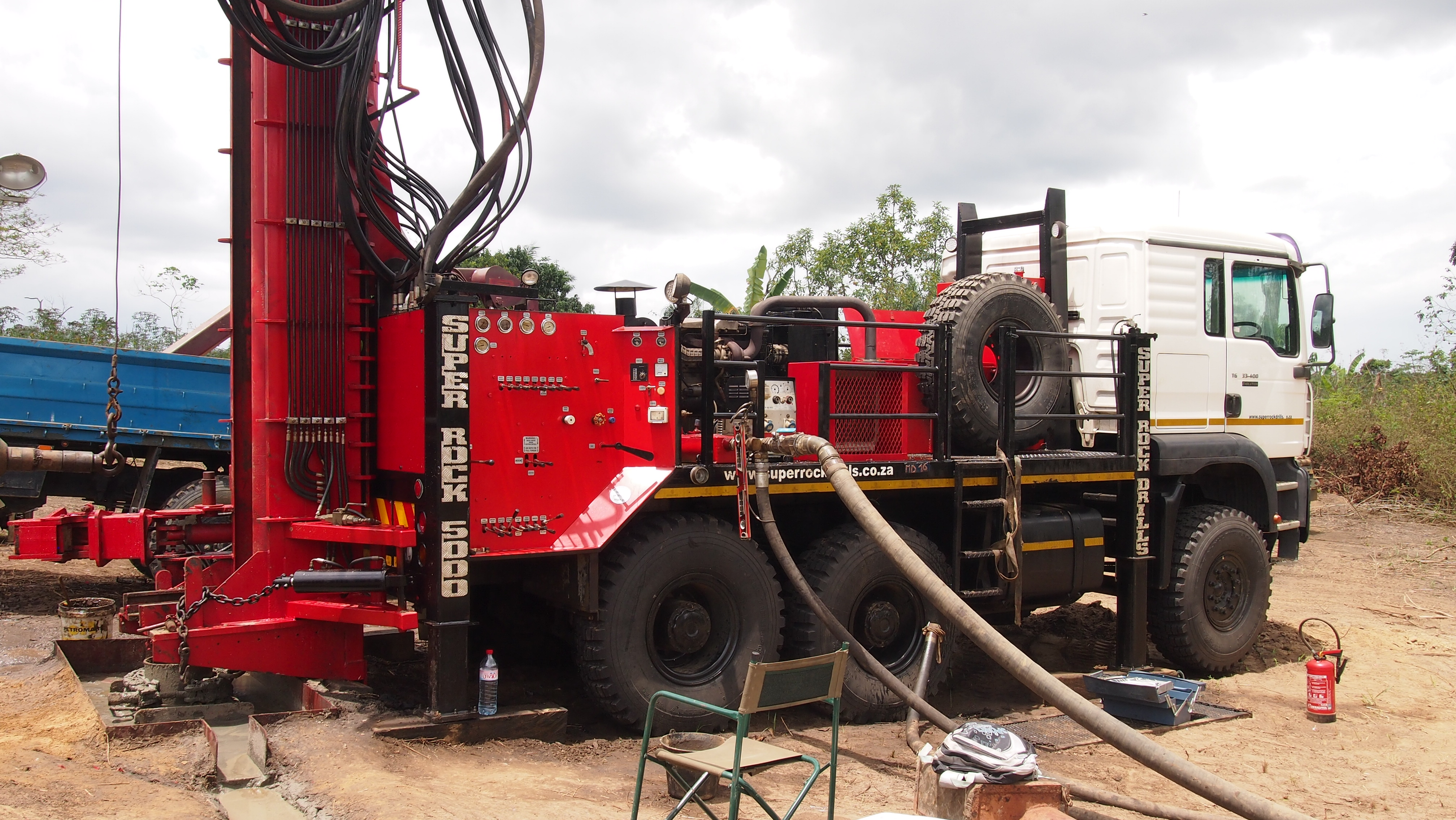
An 8" coring tool fitted to a drilling rig at Cominco Resources' Hinda Mine Site

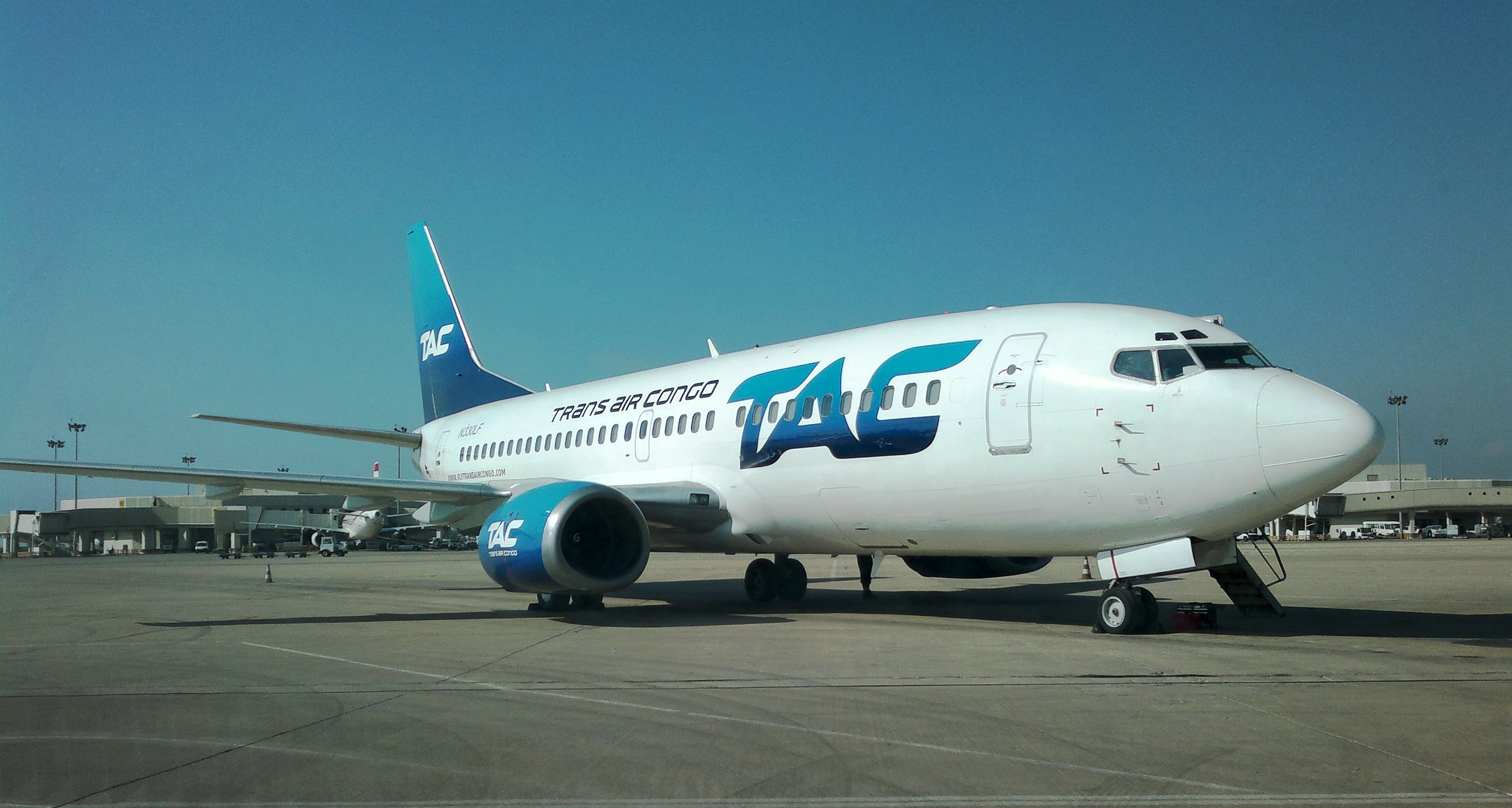
A Trans Air Congo Boeing 737-300

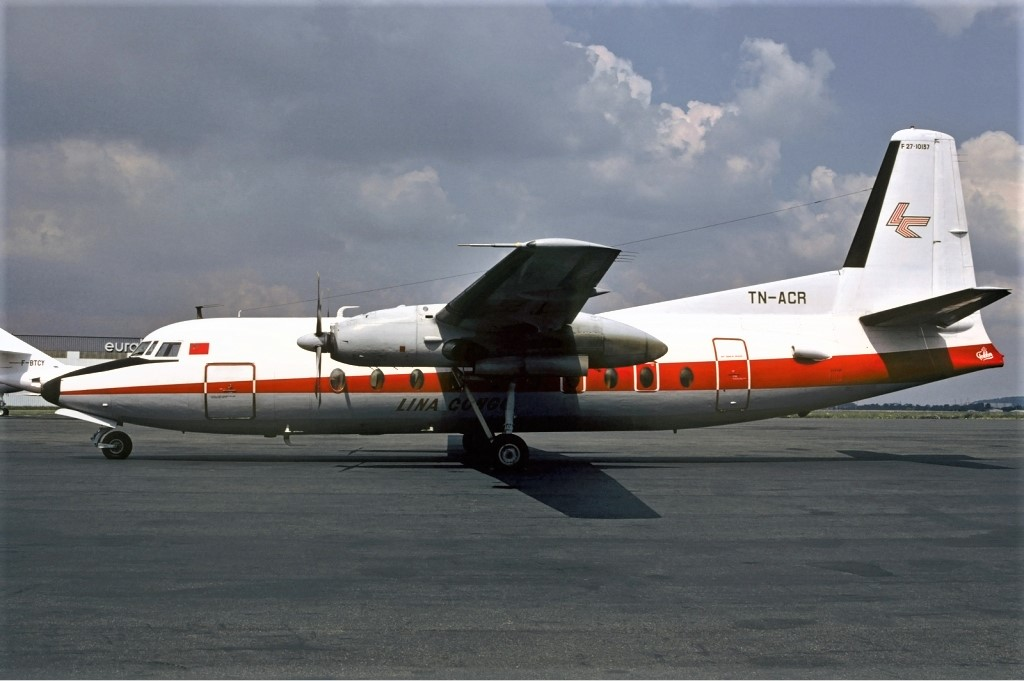
A Lina Congo Fokker F27 Friendship.

== See also ==
- List of airlines of the Republic of the Congo
- List of banks in the Republic of the Congo
- List of supermarket chains in the Republic of the Congo
