= Tsiaki District =

Tsiaki
- District
- Location within Republic of the Congo
- Country: Republic of the Congo
- Region: Bouenza Department

Area
  - Total: 428 sq mi (1,109 km^{2})

Population (2023 census)
  - Total: 10,966
  - Density: 25.61/sq mi (9.888/km^{2})
- Time zone: UTC+1 (GMT +1)

Tsiaki is a district in the Bouenza Department of Republic of the Congo.
