= List of bridges in the Republic of the Congo =

== Major bridges ==
This table presents a non-exhaustive list of the road and railway bridges with spans greater than 100 metres (328 ft) or total lengths longer than 5,000 metres (16,404 ft).

	Name	Span	Length	Type	Carries Crosses	Opened	Location	Province	Ref.
1	Brazzaville–Kinshasa Bridge project	420 m (1,380 ft)	1,695 m (5,561 ft)	Cable-stayed; Composite steel/concrete truss deck, concrete pylons Rail-road bridge	Tripoli–Cape Town Highway; Trans-African Highway 3 Congo River	2028	Brazzaville–Kinshasa	Brazzaville; Democratic Republic of the Congo	(Note: Three sites are envisaged on either side of Mbamu Island: downstream between the two capitals, in N'Gombé or upstream in Maluku. The crossings are then composed either of two cable-stayed bridges with 240 metres (790 ft) main spans on the two waterways or of a single structure with a 420 metres (1,380 ft) main span.)
2	15 August 1960 Bridge	285 m (935 ft)	545 m (1,788 ft)	Cable-stayed; Prestressed concrete deck, concrete pylons 49+81+285+81+49	Route de la Corniche; Ravin de la Glacière	2016	Brazzaville; 4°17′12.0″S 15°16′05.4″E	Brazzaville	
3	Talangaï-Kintélé Viaduct		6,865 m (22,523 ft)	Beam bridge Prestressed concrete	Corniche nord Flood plain of Congo River	2015	Brazzaville; 4°11′35.5″S 15°18′39.3″E	Brazzaville	

== See also ==
- Transport in the Republic of the Congo
- List of rivers of the Republic of the Congo
- Geography of the Republic of the Congo
- List of crossings of the Congo River

== Notes and references ==
- Notes
- References
