= East Germany–People's Republic of the Congo relations =

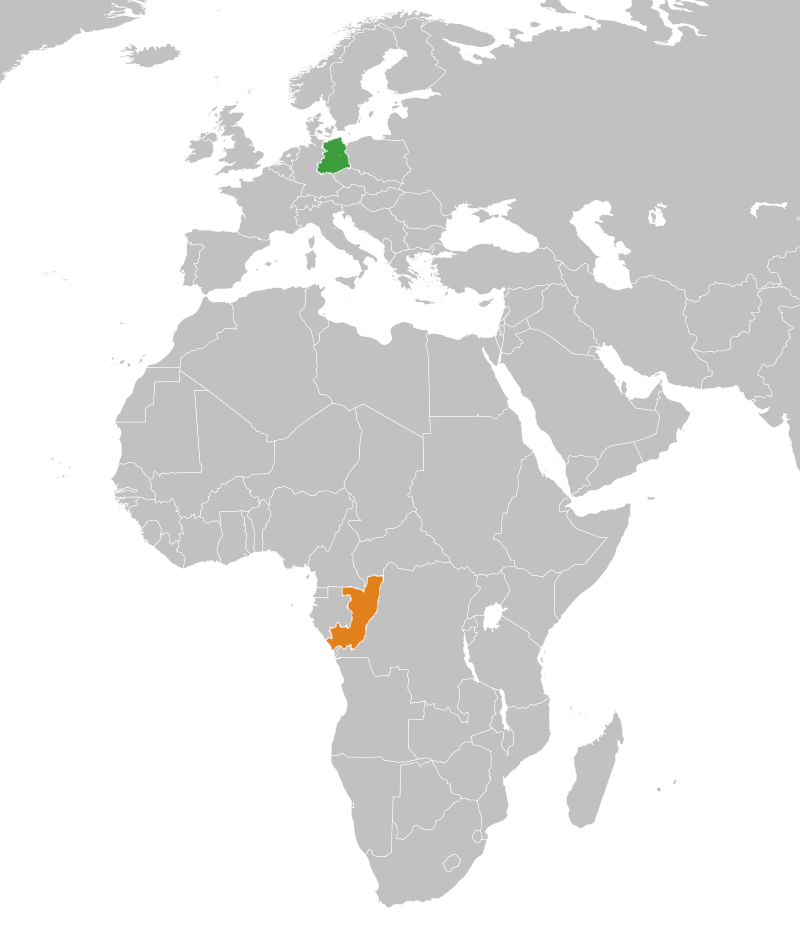

- East Germany: Congo

Diplomatic mission
- Embassy of the German Democratic Republic, Brazzaville: Embassy of the People's Republic of the Congo, East Berlin

East Germany–People's Republic of the Congo relations were the historical bilateral relations between the German Democratic Republic and the People's Republic of the Congo. Formal relations were established on January 5, 1970.

== History ==
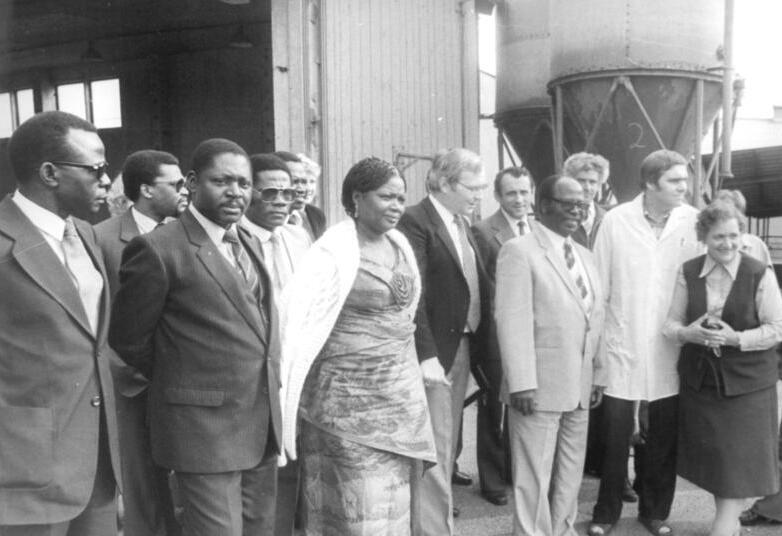
A Congolese delegation during an official visit to the German Democratic Republic, 1982

Immediately following the establishment of diplomatic relations with the Congo, East Germany undertook a multitude of efforts to develop the People's Republic. These efforts included training scholarships, the delivery of advanced technical equipment, the staffing of educational institutions in the country, and the establishment of an information commission to distribute East German and Eastern Bloc information and popular media to the Congolese public (including the distribution of DEFA films). East Germany also provided considerable assistance to the Congolese military and security forces in the 1970s and 1980s. East Germany and the People's Republic of the Congo maintained fully staffed embassies in Brazzaville and East Berlin, respectively.
