= 1990s in the Republic of the Congo =

Republic of the Congo-related events during the 1990s

The 1990s in the Republic of the Congo, starting with a collapse of the People's Republic of the Congo single party government and the promise of multi-party democracy, gradually slid into political controversy, culminating in a 1997-99 Civil War.

After decades of turbulent politics, in 1992 Congo completed a transition to multi-party democracy. Ending a long history of one-party Marxist rule, a specific agenda for this transition was laid out during Congo's national conference of 1991 and culminated in August 1992 with multi-party presidential elections. Sassou-Nguesso conceded defeat and Congo's new president, Professor Pascal Lissouba, was inaugurated on August 31, 1992.

Congolese democracy experienced severe trials in 1993 and early 1994. The President dissolved the National Assembly in November 1992, calling for new elections in May 1993. The results of those elections sparked violent civil unrest in June and again in November. In February 1994 the decisions of an international board of arbiters were accepted by all parties, and the risk of large-scale insurrection subsided.

However, Congo's democratic progress derailed in 1997. As presidential elections scheduled for July 1997 approached, tensions between the Lissouba and Sassou camps mounted. The Congolese army, loyal to President Lissouba, attacked Sassou's compound in Brazzaville on June 5. While the Army said the operation was to search for arms, Sassou used the incident as a casus belli for armed insurrection, igniting a 4-month conflict that destroyed or damaged much of Brazzaville. Lissouba traveled throughout southern and central Africa in September, asking the governments of Rwanda, Uganda, and Namibia for assistance. Laurent Kabila, the new-President of the DRC, sent hundreds of troops into Brazzaville to fight on Lissouba's behalf. About 1,000 Angolan tanks, troops, and MiG fighter jets and arms donated by the French-government bolstered Sassou's rebels. Together these forces took Brazzaville and Pointe-Noire in the morning of 16 October. Lissouba fled the capital while his soldiers surrendered and citizens began looting. France had put its 600 citizens in Brazzaville, mostly oil workers, on alert for evacuation, but ultimately decided against the measure. Soon thereafter, Sassou declared himself president and named a 33-member government.

In January 1998 the Sassou regime held a National Forum for Reconciliation to determine the nature and duration of the transition period. The Forum, tightly controlled by the government, decided elections should be held in about 3 years, elected a transition advisory legislature, and announced that a constitutional convention would finalize a draft constitution. However, the eruption in late 1998 of fighting between Sassou's government forces and an armed opposition disrupted the transitional return to democracy. This new violence also closed the economically vital Brazzaville-Pointe-Noire railroad; caused great destruction and loss of life in southern Brazzaville and in the Pool, Bouenza, and Niari regions; and displaced hundreds of thousands of persons. However, in November and December 1999, the government signed agreements with representatives of many, though not all, of the rebel groups. The December accord, mediated by President Omar Bongo of Gabon, called for follow-on, inclusive political negotiations between the government and the opposition.

== See also ==
- People's Republic of the Congo
