= List of museums in the Republic of the Congo =

This is a list of museums in the Republic of the Congo.

== Museums in the Republic of the Congo ==
- National Museum of the Congo
- Pointe-Noire Museum
- Kinkala Museum

== See also ==
- List of museums
