= 1973 Republic of the Congo constitutional referendum =

A constitutional referendum was held in the People's Republic of the Congo on 24 June 1973. The new constitution was approved by 76.7% of voters with an 83.1% turnout.

== Results ==
Choice	Votes	%
For	411,2742	77.7
Against	188,301	22.3
Invalid/blank votes	30,183	–
Total	559,756	100
Registered voters/turnout	673,223	83.1
Source: Nohlen et al.
