= International rankings of the Republic of the Congo =

These are the international rankings of the Republic of the Congo.

== International rankings ==
Organization	Survey	Ranking	Date
Institute for Economics and Peace	Global Peace Index	106 out of 144	
United Nations Development Programme	Human Development Index	136 out of 182	
Transparency International	Corruption Perceptions Index	162 out of 180	
