= Republic of the Congo–South Africa relations =

- Congo: South Africa

Republic of the Congo–South Africa relations refers to the historical relationship between the Republic of the Congo (Brazzaville) and the Republic of South Africa.

== Anti-apartheid activities ==
The Republic of the Congo was active in opposing apartheid South Africa. In November 1981, the then People's Republic of the Congo hosted a conference entitled "Apartheid and health", which discussed the health implications of racial discrimination and social inequality.

=== Negotiations to end the occupation of Namibia ===
In December 1988, representatives of Angola, Cuba and South Africa signed the Brazzaville Protocol which mandated the withdrawal of Cuban troops from Angola, paving the way for Namibia's independence through the New York Accords.

== Post-apartheid relations ==
In October 2005, a group of South African business leaders visited the Republic of the Congo.

In November 2005, South African President Thabo Mbeki led a delegation of South African politicians and businesspeople to Brazzaville in order to boost bilateral relations. The group included Ministers Mandisi Mpahlwa, Jeff Radebe and Pallo Jordan and Deputy Minister Sue van der Merwe. Mbeki met with Republic of the Congo President Denis Sassou Nguesso on the trip. Mbeki also addressed a joint session of the Parliament of the Republic of the Congo.

In October 2009, the Congolese government signed an agreement to lease 200,000 hectares of land to South African farmers. Most of the land leased to South Africans came from farms which were previously operated by the Congolese government but fell into disuse. The food produced at the farms will mostly be for the domestic market of the Republic of the Congo.

== See also ==
- Foreign relations of the Republic of the Congo
- Foreign relations of South Africa
