= Capital punishment in the Republic of the Congo =

Capital punishment was abolished in the Republic of the Congo in 2015. The country carried out its last execution in 1982. Before the abolition of the death penalty, the Republic of the Congo was classified as "Abolitionist in Practice." The Republic of the Congo is not a state party to the Second Optional Protocol to the International Covenant on Civil and Political Rights.
