= List of banks in the Republic of the Congo =

This is a list of commercial banks in the Republic of the Congo, compiled in 2021.

== List of commercial banks ==
- Bangue Postale du Congo (BPC)
- Banque Congolaise de l'Habitat (BCH)
- Banque Commerciale Internationale (BCI), part of BCP Group
- BGFIBank Congo (BGFI), part of BGFIBank Group
- Crédit du Congo (CDC), part of Attijariwafa Bank Group
- Ecobank Congo, part of Ecobank Group
- Société Générale Congo, subsequently nationalized then acquired by BGFIBank Group
- United Bank for Africa Congo (UBA), part of UBA Group
- La Congolaise de Banque (LCB), part of Bank of Africa Group
- Banque Sino-Congolaise pour l'Afrique (BSCA)
- Mutuelles Congolaises d'Épargne et de Crédit (MUCODEC), a microcredit institution
- Compagnie Financière Africaine (Cofina), a microcredit institution
- Mutuelle pour le Progrès Communautaire (MUPROCOM), a microcredit institution

== See also ==
- Bank of Central African States
- List of companies based in the Republic of the Congo
- List of banks in Africa
