= List of Republic of the Congo records in swimming =

The Republic of the Congo records in swimming are the fastest ever performances of swimmers from the Republic of the Congo, which are recognised and ratified by the Fédération Congolaise de Natation Amateur (FECONAT).

All records were set in finals unless noted otherwise.

== Long Course (50 m) ==
=== Men ===
Event	Time		Name	Club	Date	Meet	Location	Ref
50m freestyle	26.18	h	Rony Bakale	Republic of the Congo	11 September 2015	African Games	Brazzaville, Congo	
100m freestyle	58.33	h	Rony Bakale	Republic of the Congo	8 September 2015	African Games	Brazzaville, Congo	
200 m freestyle								
400 m freestyle								
800 m freestyle								
1500 m freestyle								
50m backstroke	29.48	h	Rony Bakale	Republic of the Congo	6 September 2015	African Games	Brazzaville, Congo	
100m backstroke	1:02.21	h	Rony Bakale	Republic of the Congo	10 September 2015	African Games	Brazzaville, Congo	
200 m backstroke								
50m breaststroke	39.98	h	Kurt Gwenael Oniangue	Republic of the Congo	30 July 2013	World Championships	Barcelona, Spain	
100m breaststroke	1:21.37	h	Andres Dienov Koka	Republic of the Congo	6 September 2015	African Games	Brazzaville, Congo	
200 m breaststroke								
50m butterfly	29.75	h	Andres Dienov Koka	Republic of the Congo	8 September 2015	African Games	Brazzaville, Congo	
100 m butterfly								
200 m butterfly								
200 m individual medley								
400 m individual medley								
4×100 m freestyle relay								
4×200 m freestyle relay								
4×100m medley relay	4:51.13		Emile Rony Bakale (1:04.15); Dienov Andres Koka (1:26.41); Brynich Mibansa (1:11.98); Anauskajynior Ndinga (1:08.59)	Republic of the Congo	11 September 2015	African Games	Brazzaville, Congo	

Legend: # – Record awaiting ratification by FECONAT; WR – World record; AF – African record;
Records not set in finals: h – heat; sf – semifinal; r – relay 1st leg; rh – relay heat 1st leg; b – B final; † – en route to final mark; so – swim-off; tt – time trial

=== Women ===
Event	Time		Name	Club	Date	Meet	Location	Ref
50 m freestyle	32.62	h	Stefan Bellore Sangala	Republic of the Congo	10 September 2015	African Games	Brazzaville, Congo	
100 m freestyle	1:19.10	h	Stefan Bellore Sangala	Republic of the Congo	6 September 2015	African Games	Brazzaville, Congo	
200 m freestyle								
400 m freestyle								
800 m freestyle								
1500 m freestyle								
50 m backstroke								
100 m backstroke								
200 m backstroke								
50m breaststroke	41.66	h	Bellore Sangala	Republic of the Congo	8 September 2015	African Games	Brazzaville, Congo	
100 m breaststroke								
200 m breaststroke								
50 m butterfly								
100 m butterfly								
200 m butterfly								
200 m individual medley								
400 m individual medley								
4×100 m freestyle relay								
4×200 m freestyle relay								
4×100 m medley relay								

Legend: # – Record awaiting ratification by FECONAT; WR – World record; AF – African record;
Records not set in finals: h – heat; sf – semifinal; r – relay 1st leg; rh – relay heat 1st leg; b – B final; † – en route to final mark; so – swim-off; tt – time trial

== Short Course (25 m) ==
=== Men ===
Event	Time		Name	Club	Date	Meet	Location	Ref
50m freestyle	24.16	h	Rony Bakale	Congo	10 April 2008	World Championships	Manchester, Great Britain	
100m freestyle	52.93	h	Rony Bakale	Congo	12 April 2008	World Championships	Manchester, Great Britain	
200 m freestyle								
400 m freestyle								
800 m freestyle								
1500 m freestyle								
50m backstroke	27.46	h	Congo	11 April 2008	World Championships	Manchester, Great Britain		
100m backstroke	59.91	h	Congo	9 April 2008	World Championships	Manchester, Great Britain		
200 m backstroke								
50m breaststroke								
100 m breaststroke								
200 m breaststroke								
50m butterfly	27.07	h	Rony Bakale	Congo	11 April 2008	World Championships	Manchester, Great Britain	
100m butterfly	1:00.81	h	Rony Bakale	Congo	9 April 2008	World Championships	Manchester, Great Britain	
200 m butterfly								
100 m individual medley								
200 m individual medley								
400 m individual medley								
4×50 m freestyle relay								
4×100 m freestyle relay								
4×200 m freestyle relay								
4×50 m medley relay								
4×100 m medley relay								

Legend: # – Record awaiting ratification by FECONAT; WR – World record; AF – African record;
Records not set in finals: h – heat; sf – semifinal; r – relay 1st leg; rh – relay heat 1st leg; b – B final; † – en route to final mark; so – swim-off; tt – time trial

=== Women ===
Event	Time	Name	Club	Date	Meet	Location	Ref
50 m freestyle							
100 m freestyle							
200 m freestyle							
400 m freestyle							
800 m freestyle							
1500 m freestyle							
50m backstroke							
100m backstroke							
200m backstroke							
50 m breaststroke							
100 m breaststroke							
200 m breaststroke							
50 m butterfly							
100 m butterfly							
200 m butterfly							
100 m individual medley							
200 m individual medley							
400 m individual medley							
4×50 m freestyle relay							
4×100 m freestyle relay							
4×200 m freestyle relay							
4×50 m medley relay							
4×100 m medley relay							

Legend: # – Record awaiting ratification by FECONAT; WR – World record; AF – African record;
Records not set in finals: h – heat; sf – semifinal; r – relay 1st leg; rh – relay heat 1st leg; b – B final; † – en route to final mark; so – swim-off; tt – time trial
