= Mistral Aviation =

| IATA | ICAO | Call sign |
|---|---|---|
| – | – | – |
- Founded: 2008
- Ceased operations: 2017
- Hubs: Agostinho-Neto International Airport
- Focus cities: Impfondo, Point Noire, Ouésso
- Fleet size: 2 – Douglas DC-9
- Destinations: 5
- Headquarters: Brazzaville
- Key people: Philippe Salles (Founder)
- Employees: 15

Mistral Aviation was an airline from the Republic of the Congo, which flew five times per week between Brazzaville and Point Noire. Twice between Brazzaville and Impfondo.

== Fleet ==
- 2 – Douglas DC-9
