= Agriculture in the Republic of the Congo =

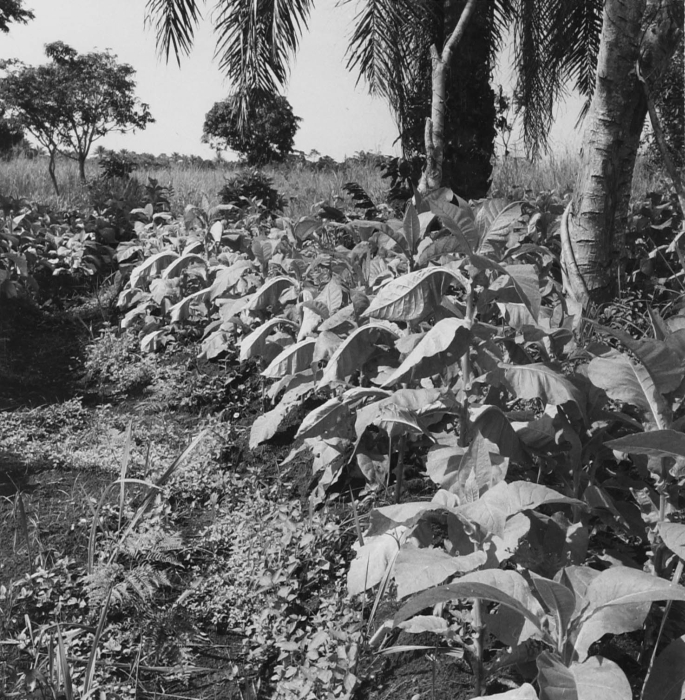
Tobacco plant

Agriculture in the Republic of the Congo is mostly at the subsistence level. Self-sufficiency in food production is yet to be achieved. Cassava (manioc) is the basic food crop everywhere in the country except in the southern region, where bananas and plantains are prevalent. Among the cash crops, the most important are sugarcane and tobacco, though palm kernels, cacao, and coffee are also cultivated to some extent. The main consumption crops are bananas, manioc, peanuts, plantains, sugarcane, and yams. Subsistence agriculture is the country's most significant employer, and it is one of the three most important economic sectors. With the government's efforts since 1987, agricultural production has increased due to "abolishing state marketing boards, freeing prices, launching new agricultural credit institutions and closing down most state farms". The Niari Valley in the south is a notable agricultural area.

== Area ==
A large part of the Republic of the Congo is clad in tropical forest and about one third of the country has poor sandy soils. Of the part used for growing crops, the actual area of cultivated land is only about 50%. According to the World Bank statistics, as of 2012, the agricultural area was 106,000 square kilometres (26,000,000 acres) which was 31% of the total land area of the country. The land used for arable cropping was 530,000 hectares (1,300,000 acres), just 1.6% of the country. The Niari Valley in the south is a notable agricultural area.

== Crops ==
Agriculture is mainly in the peri-urban and remote areas of Congo where the main crops grown are manioc (Cassava), plantains, bananas, peanuts, palm oil, fruits, vegetables, yams, beans, peas and maize. Rice is cultivated in the Niari Valley and in the Djambala District. Exports are limited to sugar, forest based products, coffee, tobacco and rubber, with sugar and timber being profitable items of export.

Despite 30% of the population being involved in agriculture, productivity is low, and agriculture accounts for under 10% of GDP. In 2010, the country imported about $300 million of food including wheat, rice, poultry meat, palm oil and milk products.

== Livestock ==
Livestock husbandry has traditionally been performed on a limited scale in the country, with cattle, sheep, goats, pigs and poultry being reared. In an effort to increase the availability of meat in rural areas, the government instituted a lend-lease system. Farmers would be lent animals by the state with the requirement to pay back the same number of animals at a later date. By 1980, around 22,000 animals were on loan and by 1990, the number of cattle and poultry in the country had quadrupled in the thirty years since independence, though the number of sheep and goats had risen by a more modest amount. In 2000, annual production of meat was 27,000 metric tonnes, but this was still far less than the country's needs.

== Development ==
The timber industry of the country was exploited by the French from the 1940s. Before independence some 80% of the population were involved in agriculture. In the late 1960s forest products were responsible for over 60 percent of total exports from the country, but by the 1980s petroleum accounted for 90 percent of exports. The country is a leading nation in the production of limba and okoumé woods. Tuna, bass, sole, and sardines are caught off Pointe-Noire for commercial purposes, although the fishing industry is relatively small.

Société du Sucre du Niari (SOSUNIARI; Sugar Society of Niarai) developed cane plantations and in 1964, it established a sugar refinery. Société Industrielle et Agricole du Congo (SIACONGO; Industrial and Agricultural Society of Congo) was founded in 1970, about the same time that the government nationalized La société industrielle et agricole du Niari (SIAN). In 1978, Sucrerie du Congo took over management of the sugar sector. Societé Industrielle et Agricole du Tabac (SIAT; Industrial and Agricultural Tobacco Company) was established in 1942, privatized in the 1990s, and was acquired by Imperial Tobacco in 2001. Agriculture accounted for less than 10% of GDP during the 1990s and 2000s, which further declined to 5% in 2008, even though 30% of the work force is engaged in farming and allied fields. A drawback in agriculture operations is that young men often prefer to move to urban areas to obtain work, leaving the task of farming to women and old people. This is one reason for the stagnation in agricultural growth in the country. In recent years, to boost agricultural production the Government of Congo has invited farmers from South Africa to carry out commercial farming in the country on a lease basis. Congo Agriculture, an affiliate of South African farmers union "Agri SA" have ventured into this operation and have established many farms, associating with the local farmers. Initial operation was started in 2011 on a farm of around 80,000 hectares. Although 2000 farmers showed an interest, only 30 farmers participated in the scheme, and as of 2012 less than 20 were reportedly active.

== Bibliography ==
- Leonard, Thomas M. (27 October 2005). Encyclopedia of the Developing World. Psychology Press. ISBN 978-1-57958-388-0.
- Clark, John F.; Decalo, Samuel (9 August 2012). Historical Dictionary of Republic of the Congo. Scarecrow Press. ISBN 978-0-8108-7989-8.
