= Child marriage in Republic of the Congo =

In 2017 in Republic of the Congo, 33% of girls are married off before 18 years old. 6% are married before they turn 15. Republic of the Congo is the 30th highest nation in the world for child marriage. Due to the ethnic cleansing that had occurred in the Democratic Republic of Congo, issues regarding poverty and lack of access to basic resources such as food and water grew in intensity. This resulted in parents who were poverty stricken selling their children in exchange for goods according to a report published by United Nations High Commissioner for Refugees
