= Geography of the Republic of the Congo =

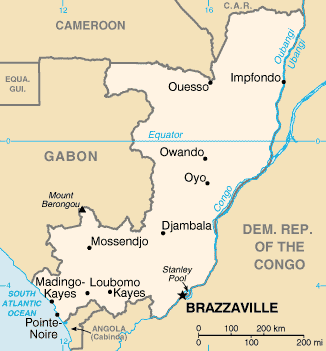
Map of the Republic of the Congo

Location map

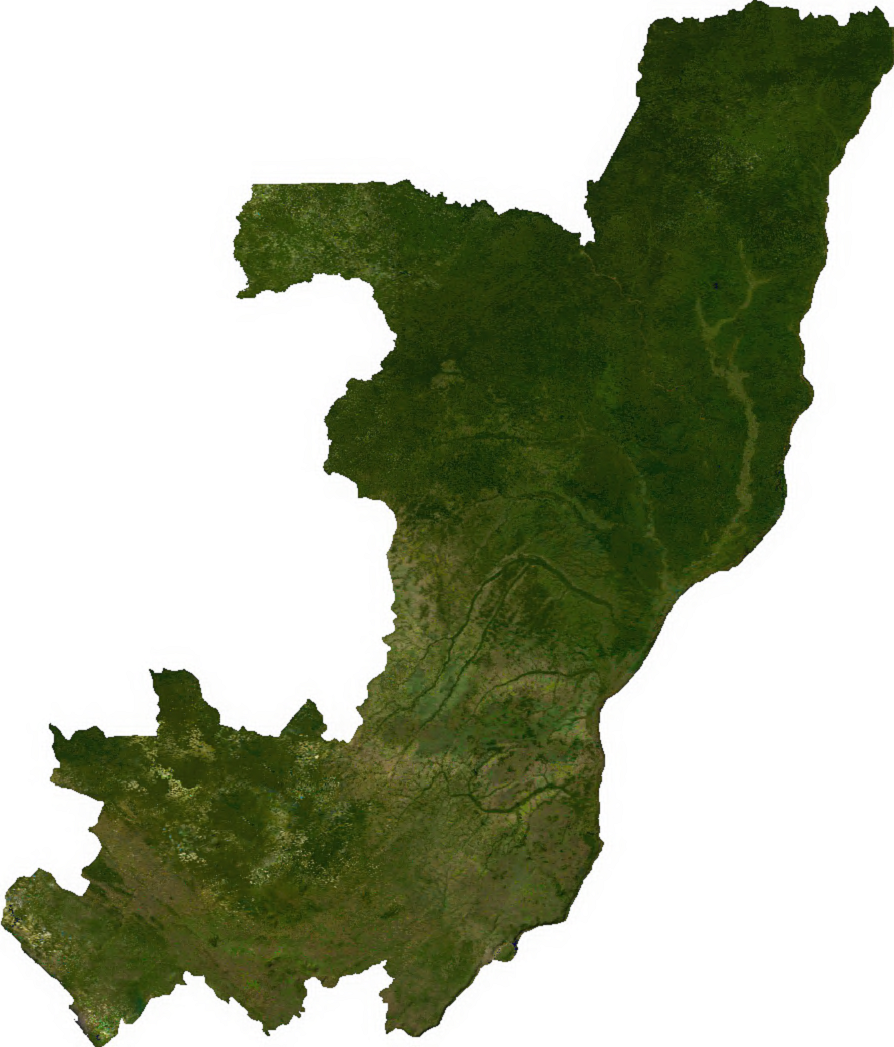
Satellite image of Congo, generated from raster graphics data supplied by The Map Library.

Republic of the Congo map of Köppen climate classification areas.

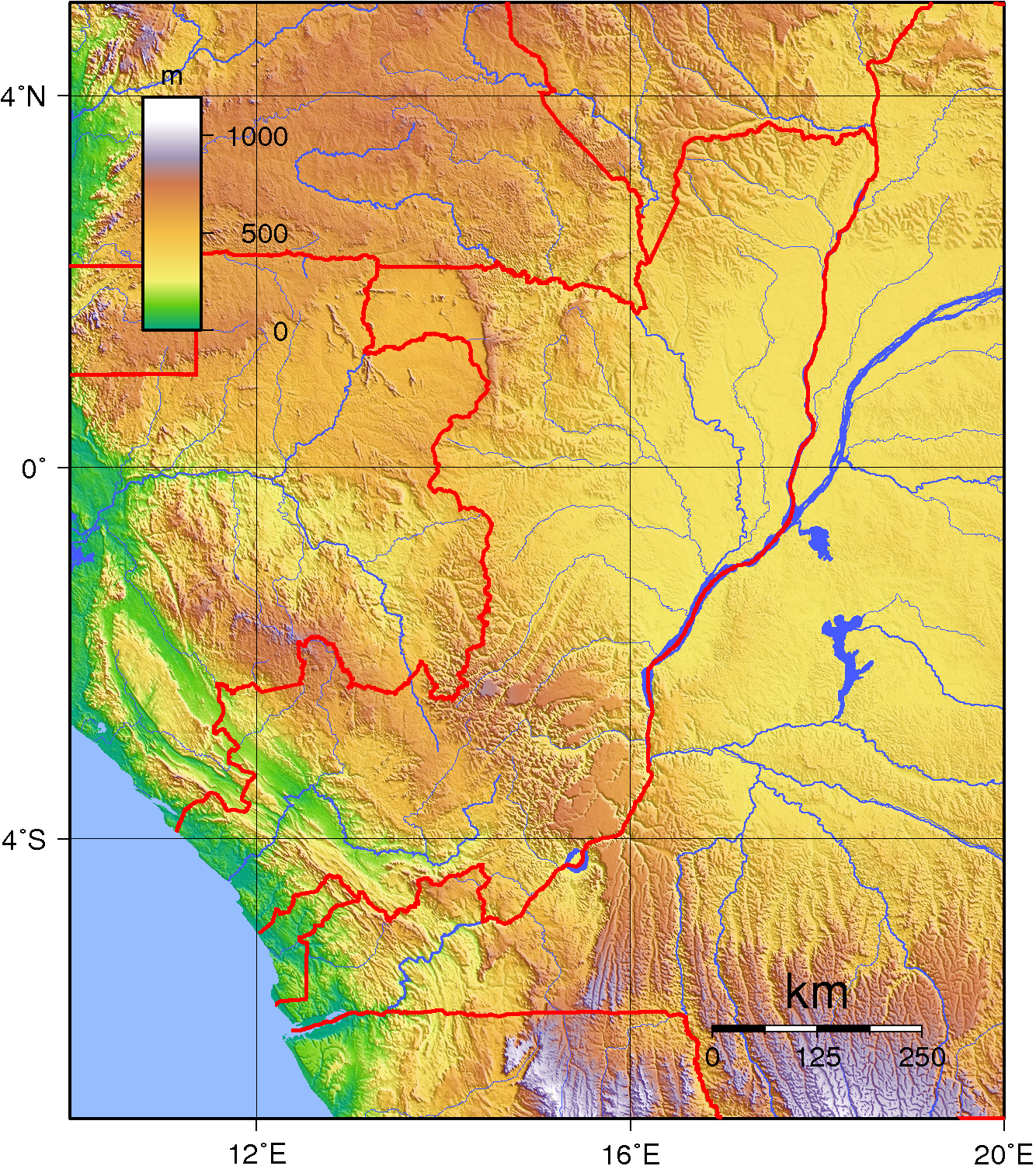
Topography of the Republic of the Congo

The Republic of the Congo is located in the western part of central Africa, on the Equator. Congo has several important ports. The Republic of the Congo covers an area of 342,000 km², of which 341,500 km² is land while 500 km² is water. Congo claims 200 nautical miles (370 km) of territorial sea.

The capital of the Republic of the Congo is Brazzaville, located on the Congo River immediately across from Kinshasa, capital of the Democratic Republic of the Congo. With a metropolitan population of approximately 1.5 million, Brazzaville is by far the largest city in the Republic, having almost twice the population of Pointe-Noire (663,400 as of the 2005 census), the country's second largest city. About 70% of the population lives in Brazzaville, Pointe-Noire, or along the railroad between them.

== Area and boundaries ==
Area
- Total: 342,000 km²
  - country rank in the world: 64th
- Land: 341,500 km²
- Water: 500 km²

Area comparative
- Australia comparative: approximately 1 1/2 times the size of Victoria
- Canada comparative: approximately 1/7 smaller than Newfoundland and Labrador
- United Kingdom comparative: approximately 2/5 larger than the United Kingdom
- United States comparative: approximately twice the size of Florida
- EU comparative: slightly smaller than Germany
Land boundaries
- Total: 5,008 kilometres or 3,112 miles
- Border countries:
  - Cabinda (Angola) (231 kilometres or 144 miles)
  - Cameroon (494 kilometres or 307 miles)
  - Central African Republic (487 kilometres or 303 miles)
  - the Democratic Republic of the Congo (1,229 kilometres or 764 miles)
  - Gabon (2,567 kilometres or 1,595 miles).
Coastline
169 kilometres (105 mi) on Atlantic Ocean

== Physical geography ==
The Republic of the Congo covers an area of approximately 342 000 km², of which about 341 500 km² is land and roughly 500 km² is water, ranking it among the world’s 70 largest countries by area. The country lies on the Equator and extends between latitudes 4° N and 5° S and longitudes 11° E and 19° E.

The terrain transitions from a coastal plain along the Atlantic Ocean in the west to interior plateaus and river valleys further inland. About 70 % of the nation is covered by tropical rainforest. Major topographical features include the Mayombe Mountains and the Niari Valley. The highest point in the country is Mount Nabemba in the Sangha region at approximately 1 020 m above sea level.

== Environment ==
=== Climate ===
Congo is a tropical nation, which means it has a tropical climate. The wet season lasts from March to June and the dry season for the rest of the year. Temperature and humidity are high as in all tropical nations. The rivers of the country are flooded seasonally.

Climate data for Brazzaville (Maya-Maya Airport) 1961–1990, extremes 1932–present
Month	Jan	Feb	Mar	Apr	May	Jun	Jul	Aug	Sep	Oct	Nov	Dec	Year
Record high °C (°F)	37.5 (99.5)	36.3 (97.3)	37.5 (99.5)	36.8 (98.2)	37.3 (99.1)	34.3 (93.7)	33.8 (92.8)	40.2 (104.4)	39.5 (103.1)	38.9 (102.0)	35.8 (96.4)	40.2 (104.4)	40.2 (104.4)
Mean daily maximum °C (°F)	30.5 (86.9)	31.3 (88.3)	31.7 (89.1)	31.8 (89.2)	30.9 (87.6)	28.4 (83.1)	27.0 (80.6)	28.5 (83.3)	30.4 (86.7)	30.8 (87.4)	30.4 (86.7)	30.2 (86.4)	30.2 (86.4)
Daily mean °C (°F)	26.0 (78.8)	26.4 (79.5)	26.7 (80.1)	26.8 (80.2)	26.2 (79.2)	23.8 (74.8)	22.4 (72.3)	23.6 (74.5)	25.5 (77.9)	26.1 (79.0)	25.9 (78.6)	25.8 (78.4)	25.4 (77.7)
Mean daily minimum °C (°F)	21.4 (70.5)	21.5 (70.7)	21.7 (71.1)	21.9 (71.4)	21.6 (70.9)	19.3 (66.7)	17.8 (64.0)	18.8 (65.8)	20.6 (69.1)	21.4 (70.5)	21.4 (70.5)	21.5 (70.7)	20.7 (69.3)
Record low °C (°F)	17.0 (62.6)	14.5 (58.1)	17.7 (63.9)	18.6 (65.5)	17.0 (62.6)	12.7 (54.9)	10.5 (50.9)	10.3 (50.5)	15.2 (59.4)	13.7 (56.7)	18.2 (64.8)	17.7 (63.9)	10.3 (50.5)
Average precipitation mm (inches)	160 (6.3)	137 (5.4)	167 (6.6)	191 (7.5)	118 (4.6)	8 (0.3)	3 (0.1)	4 (0.2)	34 (1.3)	139 (5.5)	261 (10.3)	172 (6.8)	1,394 (54.9)
Average precipitation days (≥ 1.0 mm)	10	8	11	12	8	1	0	0	4	9	14	12	89
Average relative humidity (%)	81	80	79	81	81	79	77	73	71	76	81	82	78
Mean monthly sunshine hours	171	167	192	181	177	141	127	133	145	152	157	154	1,897
Source 1: Deutscher Wetterdienst (humidity, 1951–1990) (Note: Station ID for Brazzaville/ Maya–Maya is 64450 Use this station ID to locate the sunshine duration — note link is 2017 text file download @ archive.org)
Source 2: Meteo Climat (record highs and lows)

Climate data for Pointe-Noire 1982-2012
Month	Jan	Feb	Mar	Apr	May	Jun	Jul	Aug	Sep	Oct	Nov	Dec	Year
Mean daily maximum °C (°F)	30.6 (87.1)	30.9 (87.6)	31.5 (88.7)	31.3 (88.3)	29.7 (85.5)	27.5 (81.5)	25.8 (78.4)	25.7 (78.3)	26.8 (80.2)	28.6 (83.5)	29.3 (84.7)	29.7 (85.5)	29.0 (84.1)
Daily mean °C (°F)	27.5 (81.5)	27.6 (81.7)	27.9 (82.2)	27.7 (81.9)	26.8 (80.2)	24.4 (75.9)	22.9 (73.2)	23.1 (73.6)	24.3 (75.7)	26.2 (79.2)	26.8 (80.2)	26.9 (80.4)	26.0 (78.8)
Mean daily minimum °C (°F)	24.3 (75.7)	24.3 (75.7)	24.4 (75.9)	24.2 (75.6)	23.8 (74.8)	21.4 (70.5)	20.0 (68.0)	20.4 (68.7)	21.8 (71.2)	23.8 (74.8)	24.1 (75.4)	24.0 (75.2)	23.0 (73.5)
Average precipitation mm (inches)	151.8 (5.98)	183.6 (7.23)	154.0 (6.06)	92.7 (3.65)	45.7 (1.80)	2.2 (0.09)	1.7 (0.07)	5.7 (0.22)	17.1 (0.67)	96.6 (3.80)	126.1 (4.96)	153.9 (6.06)	1,031.1 (40.59)
Source: Normales et records pour la période 2000-2016 à Pointe-Noire

Climate data for Ouésso
Month	Jan	Feb	Mar	Apr	May	Jun	Jul	Aug	Sep	Oct	Nov	Dec	Year
Mean daily maximum °C (°F)	31 (88)	32 (89)	32 (90)	33 (91)	31 (88)	30 (86)	29 (85)	29 (85)	30 (86)	31 (87)	31 (87)	30 (86)	31 (87)
Mean daily minimum °C (°F)	21 (69)	21 (69)	22 (71)	22 (71)	22 (71)	21 (70)	21 (69)	21 (69)	21 (69)	21 (69)	21 (69)	20 (68)	21 (70)
Average rainfall mm (inches)	56 (2.2)	79 (3.1)	150 (5.9)	130 (5)	150 (6)	120 (4.6)	79 (3.1)	150 (6.1)	220 (8.7)	230 (8.9)	150 (6)	84 (3.3)	1,598 (62.9)
Source: Weatherbase

=== Ecology ===
The terrain is a variation of coastal plains, mountainous regions, plateaus and fertile valleys. About 70 percent of the country's area is covered by rain forest. The highest point, at 1,020 m, is Mont Nabeba in the Mayumbe mountains. The major rivers are the Congo River at the border with the Democratic Republic of the Congo, and the Kouilou-Niari River.

A 2014 expedition leaving from Itanga village discovered a peat bog "as big as England" which stretches into neighboring Democratic Republic of the Congo.

UNESCO has declared two world biosphere reserves in the country: Odzala in 1977 and Dimonika in 1988.

=== Natural resources ===
Natural resources include petroleum, timber, potash, lead, zinc, uranium, copper, phosphates, gold, magnesium, natural gas, and hydropower.

As of a 2012 estimate, 1.55% of the land is arable, while only 0.20% contains permanent crops. Approximately 20 km² is irrigated (2003 estimation).

=== Environmental issues ===
Environmental issues include the high level of air pollution from vehicle emissions, water pollution from the dumping of raw sewage, tap water not being potable, and deforestation.

Congo is party to the international agreements on Biodiversity, Climate Change, Desertification, Endangered Species, Ozone Layer Protection, Tropical Timber 83, Tropical Timber 94, Wetlands. It has signed but not ratified the Law of the Sea and so on.

=== Forests ===
==== Tree cover extent and loss ====
Global Forest Watch publishes annual estimates of tree cover loss and 2000 tree cover extent derived from time-series analysis of Landsat satellite imagery in the Global Forest Change dataset. In this framework, tree cover refers to vegetation taller than 5 m (including natural forests and tree plantations), and tree cover loss is defined as the complete removal of tree cover canopy for a given year, regardless of cause.

For the Republic of the Congo, country statistics report cumulative tree cover loss of 1,150,323 ha (11,503.23 km^{2}) from 2001 to 2024 (about 4.4% of its 2000 tree cover area). For tree cover density greater than 30%, country statistics report a 2000 tree cover extent of 26,388,421 ha (263,884.21 km^{2}). The charts and table below display this data. In simple terms, the annual loss number is the area where tree cover disappeared in that year, and the extent number shows what remains of the 2000 tree cover baseline after subtracting cumulative loss. Forest regrowth is not included in the dataset.

Annual tree cover loss in the Republic of the Congo, 2001–2024. View chart definition.
Tree cover extent in 2000 minus cumulative tree cover loss in the Republic of the Congo, 2001–2024 (loss-only residual; does not account for gain). View chart definition.

Annual tree cover extent and loss
Year	Tree cover extent (km2) (Note: This residual measure does not include forest regrowth.)	Annual tree cover loss (km2)
2001	263,613.90	270.31
2002	263,370.79	243.11
2003	263,185.65	185.14
2004	263,047.33	138.32
2005	262,858.79	188.54
2006	262,637.25	221.54
2007	262,339.61	297.64
2008	262,165.86	173.75
2009	261,975.12	190.74
2010	261,528.47	446.65
2011	261,244.72	283.75
2012	260,923.28	321.44
2013	260,376.86	546.42
2014	259,647.95	728.91
2015	259,169.72	478.23
2016	258,026.69	1,143.03
2017	257,387.94	638.75
2018	256,760.96	626.98
2019	256,023.39	737.57
2020	255,377.99	645.40
2021	254,796.06	581.93
2022	254,201.81	594.25
2023	253,527.65	674.16
2024	252,380.98	1,146.67

==== REDD+ reference levels and monitoring ====
Under the UNFCCC REDD+ framework, the Republic of the Congo has submitted national forest reference emission levels (FRELs). On the UNFCCC REDD+ Web Platform, the country’s 2016 and 2024 submission packages are both listed as having assessed reference levels; a national REDD+ strategy is listed as reported, while safeguards information and a national forest monitoring system are listed as “not reported”.

The first assessed FREL, technically assessed in 2017, covered the REDD+ activities “reducing emissions from deforestation” and “reducing emissions from forest degradation” at national scale. It used a historical reference period of 2000–2012 and was assessed at 35,475,652 t CO2 eq per year for 2015–2020, including an upward adjustment for national circumstances linked to the country’s high-forest, low-deforestation profile and projected planned deforestation and degradation. The technical assessment reported that this first FREL included biomass and deadwood for deforestation, biomass for forest degradation, and CO2 only.

An updated national FREL was submitted in 2024 and assessed in 2025. It again covered deforestation and forest degradation at national scale, but used a more recent historical reference period of 2017–2021 and was assessed at 31,656,549 t CO2 eq per year after revision during the technical assessment. The technical assessment states that the revised benchmark used updated activity data and national forest-inventory emission factors, and expanded coverage to include biomass, deadwood, litter and, for deforestation, soil organic carbon, while also adding non-CO2 emissions (CH_{4} and N_{2}O) from forest fires.

== Extreme points ==
This is a list of the extreme points of the Republic of Congo, i.e. the points that are farther north, south, east, or west than any other location.

- Northernmost point — unnamed location on the border with Central African Republic immediately south-west of the CAR town of Madoukou, Likouala department
- Easternmost point — Motenge-Bom, Likouala department
- Southernmost point — unnamed headland near the point at which the Congo-Cabinda border enters the Atlantic Ocean, Kouilou department
- Westernmost point — the point at which the border with Gabon enters the Atlantic Ocean, Kouilou department

== See also ==
- Geology in the Republic of the Congo
