= Vehicle registration plates of the Republic of the Congo =

Republic of the Congo
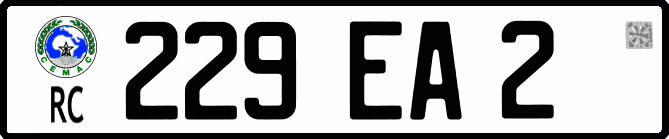
- Congolese regular legal standard number plate.
- Country: Republic of the Congo
- Country code: RCB

Current series
- Size: 520 mm × 110 mm 20.5 in × 4.3 in
- Serial format: Not standard
- Colour (front): Black on white
- Colour (rear): Black on white

The vehicle registration plates of the Republic of the Congo is a legal form requiring the citizens of the Republic of the Congo to have the car registered. Its international road code is RCB, despite unofficially displaying RC on its current plates (which, conversely, is Taiwan's official code).

== Regular license plates ==
The current scheme of regular license plates Congo, based on the French system of FNI, introduced in 1982. It has 123AB4 formats or 123A45, where 123 - number AS - Series 45 - area code. Since 2006, the left side of the plate are the emblem of the Central African economic and Monetary Community (CEMAC).

The current allocation combinations for regional coding was introduced in 1982.

- 1 - Nkayi
- 2 - Lekoumou
- 3 - Ouesso
- 4 - Capital District (Brazzaville)
- 5 - Kouilou
- 6 - Pointe-Noire
- 7 - Likouala
- 8 - Cuvette
- 9 - Nyari
- 10 - Loubomo
- 11 - Bouenza
- 12 - Pool
- 13 - Sanga
- 14 - Plateau

== Other formats ==
=== Diplomatic license plates ===
The diplomatic license plates have repeated the appropriate format French number plates of this type: 123CD45 where 123 - country code or international organization, CD - index diplomatic transport 45 - number. The plates have orange symbols on a green background in the left side of the plate are the emblem of the Central African economic and Monetary Community (CEMAC) and RC code.

=== Temporary license plate imports ===
License plates for foreign NGOs have black characters on a green background and format 123AB4 IT where IT - pointer "temporary import" 123 - number AS - Series 4 - area code. In the left side of the plate are the emblem of the Central African economic and Monetary Community (SEMAS) and RC code.
