= 1987 Republic of the Congo coup attempt =

Failed coup d'état attempt

1987 Republic of the Congo coup d'état attempt
Date	July - September 1987
Location	People's Republic of the Congo
Result	Coup fails: Denis Sassou Nguesso remains in power

Belligerents
Government of the People's Republic of the Congo	Army faction

From July to September 1987, forces loyal to Denis Sassou Nguesso defeated Kouyous forces which attempted to overthrow his regime. Pierre Anga, one of the coup leaders, fled to Owando where he was killed on September 6, 1987 ending the coup.
