= Cassava production in the Republic of the Congo =

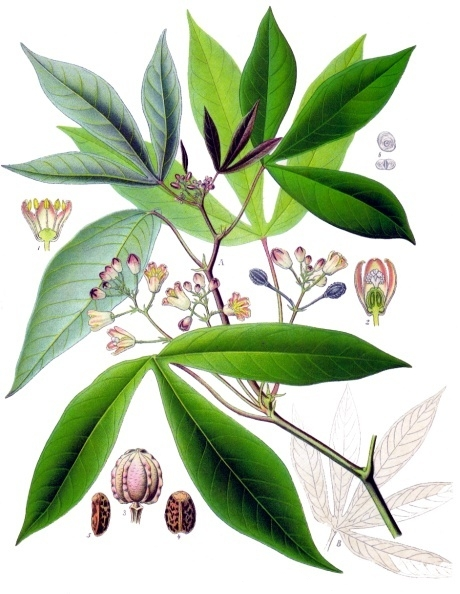
Cassava plant

Cassava (Manihot esculenta, manioca in French language) production is important to the economy of the Republic of the Congo as it is its prime crop. The importance of cassava consumption is reflected in the country's popular song, "The Congolese Love Cassava". It is consumed in several forms, and marketed as paste, cossettes, foufou (flour), and chikwangue. As a staple food crop, cassava is grown in most parts of the country, except the southern region where the crops grown are banana and plantains. Cassava and yams are the primary subsistence crops grown in the country's valleys, with farmers producing five harvests per year. The Republic of the Congo, as of 1996, was the world's second largest consumer of cassava after Zaire, now known as the Democratic Republic of the Congo.

== Production ==
Cassava is the country's main food. Cassava production and consumption have generally matched since the early 1990s. In 1999, cassava accounted for 90% of the country's food output. In 2008, the production reported was 1.09 million tons. However, in recent years production is said to have exceeded consumption. Rural consumption of cassava is far more than the urban consumption, more than double; chikwangue is the preferred variety. Cassava leaves, known as saka-saka or mpondu are used as a substitute in recipes for other greens such as collard, kale, spinach, or turnips. The country occupies 28th position in the ranking of cassava producing countries and its share in total world production is only 0.05%, which in 2013, was 1.25 million tons grown in an area of 160,000 ha.

=== Private sector participation ===
In order to bring better food security in the country private sector participation through a project titled "Cassava value chain development program" was mooted in 2009; this linkage is proposed to strengthen the efforts of the World Bank (WB), Food and Agriculture Organization (FAO) and International Institute of Tropical Agriculture (IITA) working in the country. It was estimated that the business potential in such a venture could be of the order of US$174 million. Such an investment could achieve an annual cassava production rate of 242,000 tons.

=== Processing and derivatives ===
Southern Congo's Bouenza region produces cassava surpluses and has the potential for an industrial cassava value chain. The Mantsoumba factory closed in the 1990s and this potential remains untapped as of 2020.

In the Republic of Congo, cassava processing remains largely artisanal. Cooperatives located in Yamba district process cassava tubers into gari and attiéké using equipment originally designed in West Africa, including mechanical grinders and presses. The 'ProManioc' initiative implemented by the World Food Program with funding from the European Union is disseminating improved techniques.

In the same area, women's groups produce mbala pinda, a cassava and peanut bar. Fresh cassava and peanut butter are mixed, wrapped in leaves and steamed. Chilies and dried fish are added. The mbala pinda are sold at markets and at the roadside. The product has been made in Southern Congo for more than 100 years, dating back to colonial times.

== Bibliography ==
- Dufour, D.; O'Brien, G. M.; Best, Rupert (1996). Cassava flour and starch: progress in research and development. CIAT. ISBN 978-958-9439-88-3.
- Famighetti, Robert (1 November 1999). The World Almanac and Book of Facts: 2000 : the authority since 1868. St Martins Press. ISBN 978-0-88687-847-4.
- Haggett, Peter (2002). Encyclopedia of World Geography. Marshall Cavendish. ISBN 978-0-7614-7306-0.
- Jacob, Jeanne; Ashkenazi, Michael (15 January 2014). The World Cookbook: The Greatest Recipes from Around the Globe [4 Volumes]: The Greatest Recipes from Around the Globe, Revised Edition. ABC-CLIO. ISBN 978-1-61069-469-8.
- McColl, R. W. (1 January 2005). Encyclopedia of World Geography. Infobase Publishing. ISBN 978-0-8160-7229-3.
- Paine, Sarah C.M. (28 January 2015). Nation Building, State Building, and Economic Development: Case Studies and Comparisons. Routledge. ISBN 978-1-317-46409-9.
