= Republic of the Congo–Russia relations =

- Congo: Russia

Republic of the Congo–Russia relations (Russian: Отношения России и Республики Конго) refers to bilateral foreign relations between the Republic of the Congo and Russia. The Republic of the Congo has an embassy in Moscow. Russia has an embassy in Brazzaville.

== Political cooperation ==
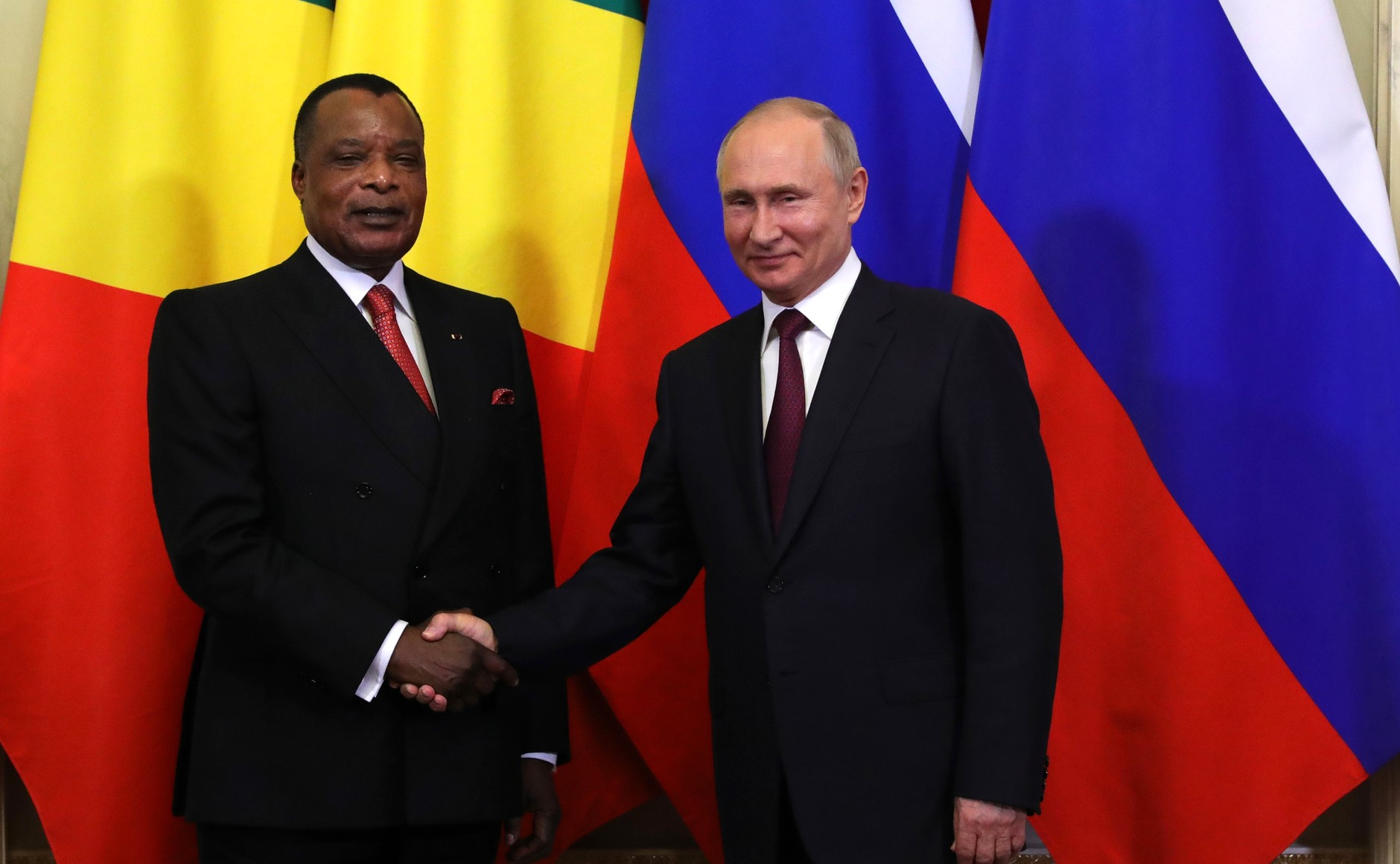
Presidents Vladimir Putin and Denis Sassou Nguesso at the ceremony for exchanging documents signed following Russia-Congo talks, May 2019

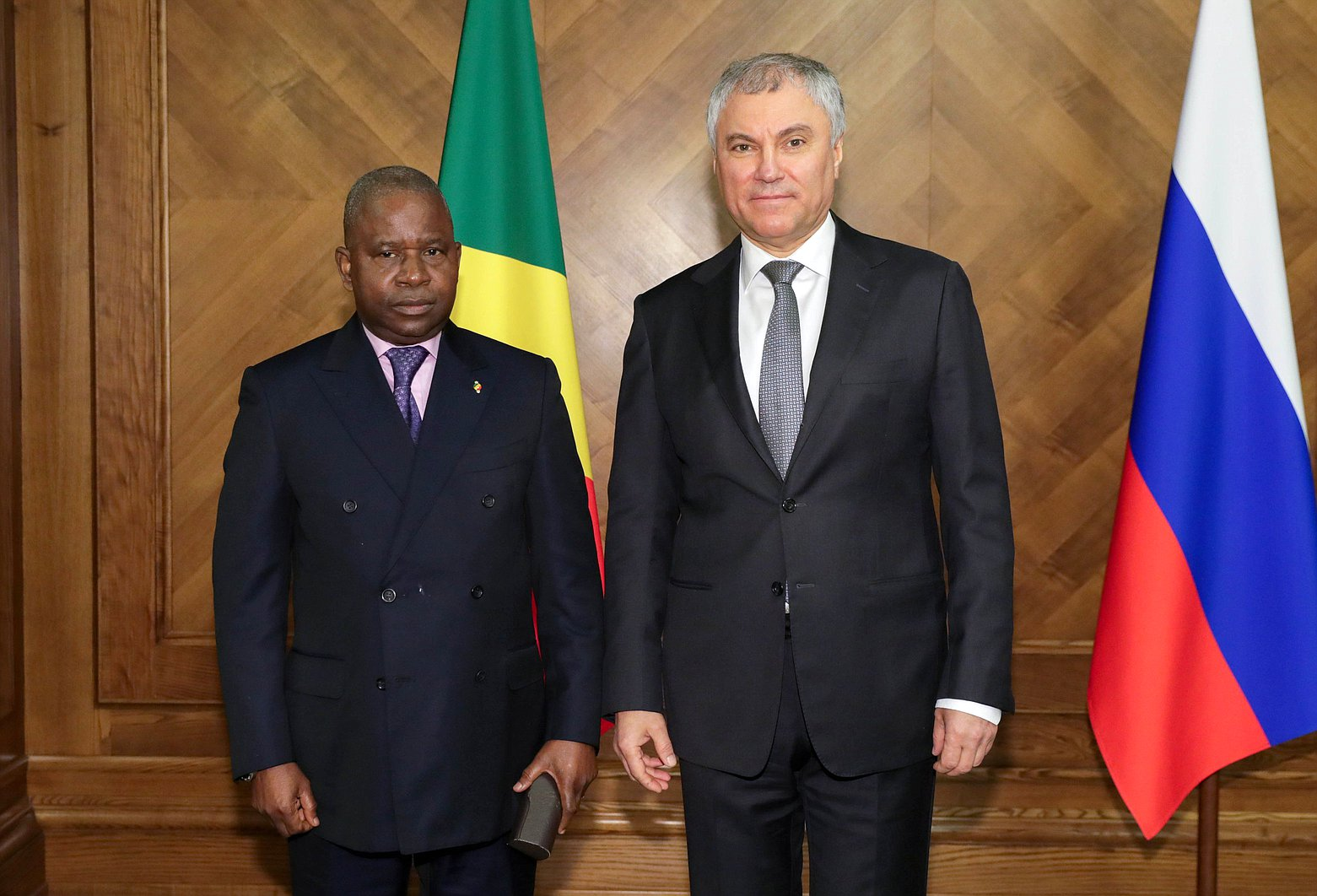
Vyacheslav Volodin and Pierre Ngolo at the “Russia-Africa” parliamentary conference in Moscow on 20 March 2023

Since the establishment of diplomatic relations between the two countries (16 March 1964), the initial goal was to provide a solid legal basis for bilateral cooperation. In that time, over 80 agreements and protocols were agreed upon, including a Treaty of Friendship and Cooperation, an agreement on cultural and scientific cooperation, on air, on economic and technical cooperation, trade, and the establishment of a mixed bilateral commission on economic, scientific and technological cooperation and trade. During the presidency of pro-Western president Pascal Lissouba (1992–1997), the volume of bilateral relations began to decline significantly. In 1997, Denis Sassou-Nguesso returned to the post of head of state and called for the resumption of multi-faceted cooperation with Russia in all fields. In March 2000, inter-ministerial consultations resumed which were then held in September 2001 in Moscow, where, a protocol on consultations between the foreign ministries was signed. The next round of Russian-Congolese ministerial consultations on bilateral relations took place in August 2010 in Brazzaville. During Adada's talks with Sergey Lavrov, they discussed the state and prospects of bilateral relations, the issue of conflicts on the African continent, among other things. In 2004, a delegation of Brazzaville friendship with Africa Federation Council of Russia, headed by S. V. Anohinym was held. The delegation was received by the President of the Senate of the Congo A. E. Numazalaem. During the negotiations, the possibility of expanding parliamentary exchanges and enhance ties between the Federation was discussed. Meetings with other government officials and business leaders of the Congo were also held.

A visit to the Republic of Congo by a Russian parliamentary delegation was led by Deputy Chairman of the State Duma of the Federal Assembly of the Russian Federation M. V. Gerasimovoy. In 2005 was an inter-ministerial consultations on cooperation in the UN Security Council. In 2006, Denis Sassou-Nguesso as Chairman of the African Union took part in the format of an extended dialogue summit of the "Group of Eight" in St. Petersburg.

From April 28 to May 2, 2026, President of the Republic of the Congo Denis Sassou Nguesso conducted a state visit to Moscow, where he was received by Russian Deputy Prime Minister Alexander Novak. Joined by a delegation including the Congolese ministers of defense, foreign affairs, agriculture, mining, and international cooperation, Sassou Nguesso held bilateral talks with Russian President Vladimir Putin on April 29. Discussions focused on key economic cooperation initiatives, notably the construction of a more than 1,000-kilometer oil pipeline extending to Congo's northern Atlantic coast.

== Economic relations ==
Trade and economic cooperation rather actively developed until 1992 two meetings of the Joint Intergovernmental Commission. On account of our loans provided technical assistance in the construction in Congo a number of important industrial and social facilities. At no cost to build a scientific Brazzaville Veterinary Laboratory, the National Printing House, a maternity home. After the start of the internal armed conflict in 1997, bilateral trade relations were suspended. In June of the same year, the representation of Aeroflot in Brazzaville was closed. Certain positive steps outlined in the last period in the field of oil production. Mutual interest in cooperation in the joint exploration and development of oil fields in Congo was demonstrated in June 2006, during a visit to the country head of the Russian oil company "Lukoil Overseas Holding" A. R. Kuzyaevym. Another promising Russian project in Congo are plans for the construction in the city of Pointe-Noire plant for production of primary aluminum (project worked JSC "Russian Aluminum"). However, the implementation of these plans with investments in the $ 2 billion is only possible in case of a relatively cheap source of electricity. In 2006, in Brazzaville, a delegation of IFC "Metropol". This association is interested in projects in the field of gold and base metals, as well as considering the issue of the opening of the bank in Congo. In May 2010, in Brazzaville, a bilateral business forum with the participation of Russian economic operators and local business organizations, in which discussed ways to enhance cooperation in areas such as energy, transport, mining and finance. As a result of the joint forum signed a cooperation agreement between the chambers of commerce of the two countries, aimed at creating favorable conditions for the development of trade and economic relations between Russia and the Republic of Congo. The question of opening a branch of KAMAZ, representative of St.Petersburg telecommunications company "General Satellite", started to register the company, "Fair Pay" (EFT instant payments). In late April and early May 2011 held a business mission to Brazzaville delegation of Russian businessmen, led by director of the department of foreign economic cooperation Russian Chamber of Commerce, Vice Chairman of the Coordination Committee on Economic Cooperation with Africa (sub-Saharan) S. V. Vasiliev. In June 2011, in Moscow, was a Congolese delegation to participate in the international show "Integrated Safety and Security Exhibition 2011", which included a defense and internal affairs. Congolese participated in the meeting in Moscow International Parliamentary Conference "Russia-Africa: Horizons of Cooperation." RK debt to Russia on earlier loans of about $ 170 million. Cooperation in education, science and culture. In recent years, the Congo was allocated 35 scholarships on the state line (30 of them - for a full course of study and 5 - to graduate school and internship). In the 2010/2011 academic year to study in Russian universities was taken 41 Congolese, 4 people - by public organizations ("INKORVUZ", "Roszarubezhcentr 'Association of Foreign Students and PFUR). Commercial (contract) basis to study in Russian universities were recruited 35 citizens of Congo (including 26 – between the Russian company "RACUS" and others - self-signed private contracts with Russian universities). In the Soviet and Russian universities over 7,000 Congolese citizens were trained. About one third of the current government of Congo was graduates of the former USSR and Russia. In Brazzaville exists a Russian Centre of Science and Culture.

== See also ==
- List of ambassadors of Russia to the Republic of the Congo
- Foreign relations of the Republic of the Congo
- Foreign relations of Russia
