= List of ecoregions in the Republic of the Congo =

The following is a list of ecoregions in the Republic of the Congo, according to the Worldwide Fund for Nature (WWF).

== Terrestrial ecoregions ==
by major habitat type

=== Tropical and subtropical moist broadleaf forests ===
- Atlantic Equatorial coastal forests
- Northwestern Congolian lowland forests
- Western Congolian swamp forests

=== Tropical and subtropical grasslands, savannas, and shrublands ===
- Western Congolian forest–savanna mosaic

== Freshwater ecoregions ==
by bioregion

=== West Coastal Equatorial ===
- Central West Coastal Equatorial
- Southern West Coastal Equatorial

=== Congo ===
- Upper Congo Rapids
- Lower Congo Rapids
- Sangha
- Sudanic Congo (Oubangi)

== Marine ecoregions ==
- Gulf of Guinea South
