= La Semaine Africaine =

Congolese newspaper

- Type: Weekly newspaper
- Founded: 1952; 73 years ago
- Language: French
- City: Brazzaville
- Country: Republic of the Congo
- ISSN: 0488-2024
- Website: lasemaineafricaine.info

La Semaine Africaine is a French-language newspaper published in Brazzaville, Republic of the Congo, and serving Central Africa. La Semaine is owned by the Roman Catholic Episcopal Conference of the Congo, but maintains editorial independence. Founded in 1952 as La Semaine de l'AEF, it received its present title in 1960, when the Republic of the Congo gained independence from France. Between 1963 and 1990, it was the only media outlet in the Republic of the Congo not controlled by the state. In 1970, its circulation was greater than 10,000. As of 2023, it is published twice a week. Contributing writers have included Sylvain Bemba, Emmanuel Damongo-Dadet, and Jean Clotaire Hymboud.
