= Wildlife of the Republic of the Congo =

The wildlife of the Republic of the Congo is a mix of species of different kinds of organisms. There are 400 mammal species, 1,000 bird species and 10,000 plant species (3,000 of which are unique to the Republic of the Congo) in the country. Many parts of the country are covered in tropical rainforest, although some of the southern areas have been cleared by logging.

The wider Congo River Basin has earned a global reputation for the variety of wildlife found inside its forests.

== Rainforests ==
A large portion of the Republic of the Congo is tropical rainforest. The forest is split into several sections, the first being low lying branches of large evergreen trees. The next level contains smaller trees and plants. Under that level lies bushes and ferns. The floor of this region consists of mainly ferns, vines, and roots that twist and turn throughout different vegetation. Roughly 69% of the country consists of forest areas.

The Congo Basin was designated as a UNESCO heritage site on July 1, 2012.

== Wildlife ==
=== Flora ===
The Republic of the Congo is home to approximately 10,000 species of tropical plants. Among which thirty percent (3,000) of these species are specific to Congo. Congo plants include some of the most diverse and rich environments and the largest forest areas, with only the Democratic Republic of the Congo being more diverse. There are about 6,000 plant species in the country.

=== Fauna ===
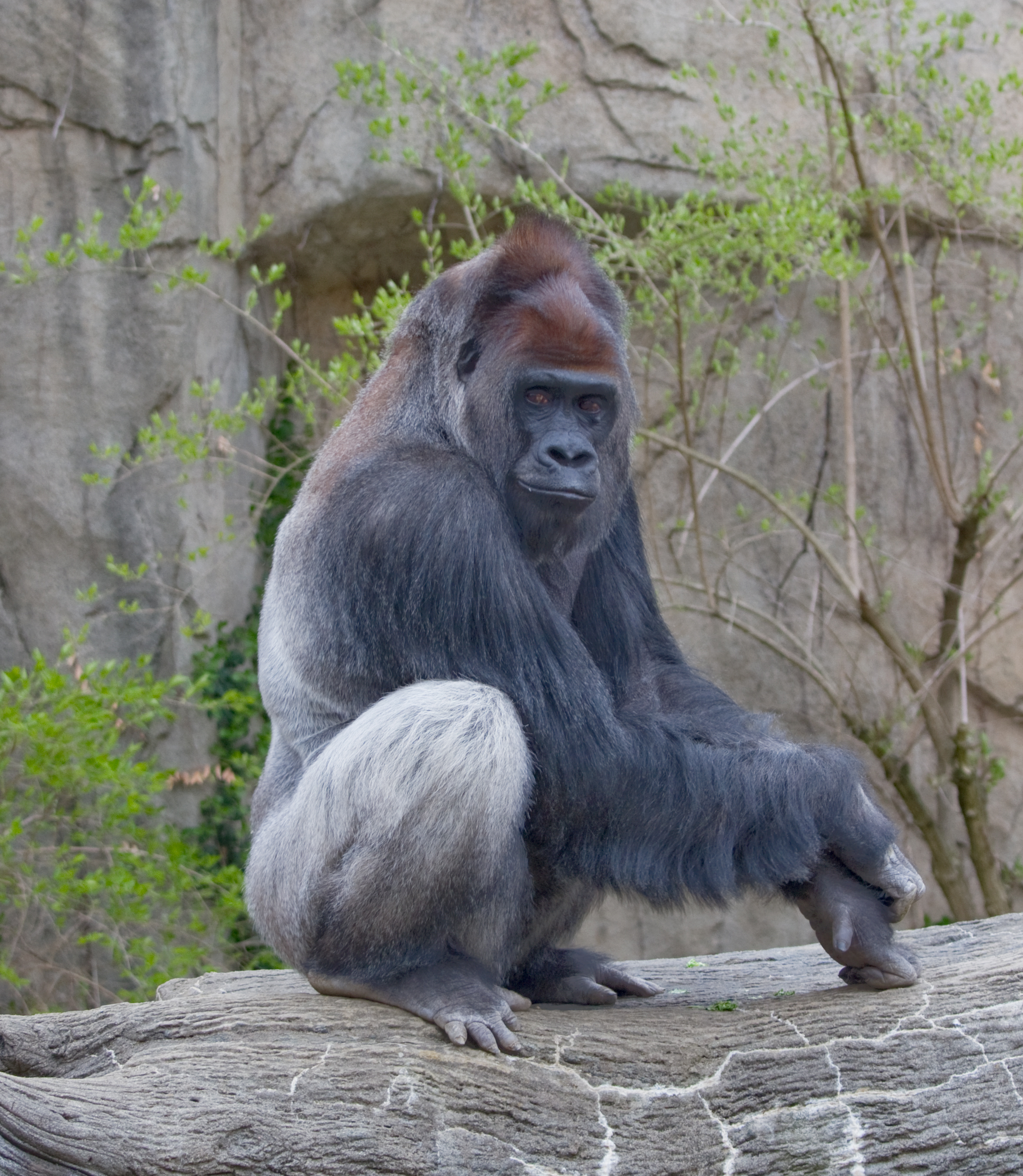
Gorilla gorilla gorilla

Around 2008, researchers from the Wildlife Conservation Society studied gorillas in heavily forested regions centered on the Ouesso district of the Sangha Region. They suggested a population on the order of 125,000 western lowland gorillas (Gorilla gorilla gorilla), whose isolation from humans has been largely preserved by inhospitable swamps.

=== Fish ===
There are around 700 species of fish in the Republic of the Congo.

== See also ==
- Wildlife of the Democratic Republic of the Congo
- List of ecoregions in the Democratic Republic of the Congo
