= Télé Congo =

- Country: Congo
- Broadcast area: Sub-Saharan Africa, Various
- Headquarters: Brazzaville

Programming
- Languages: French, Kituba, Lingala

Ownership
- Owner: Government of the Republic of Congo
- Parent: Radiodiffusion Télévision Congolaise
- Key people: André Ondélé (director general)

History
- Founded: 28 November 1962
- Launched: August 1963

Links
- Website: www.telecongo.tk

Availability analogue, satellite, IP, cable

Terrestrial
- VHF SECAM: channel 1
- Atlantic Bird 3
- NSS 7
- CanalSat Horizons: channel 330

Streaming media
- Bbox: channel 556
- Alice ADSL
- Freebox TV: channel 458
- Orange TV: channel 537
- FR Neufbox TV: channel 566

Télé Congo, derived from Télévision Congolaise, is the national television of the Republic of Congo, from the public broadcaster Radio Télévision Congolaise (RTC). Founded on 27 November 1962 with a three-day experimental service funded by French company OCORA, it started broadcasting operations in August 1963. It is the oldest television network in sub-Saharan Africa. As late as the 1970s, it operated on one transmitter in Brazzaville.

== History ==
In October 1962, the Brazzaville government took a decision at the SORAFOM offices in Paris to establish a three-day experimental period from 27 to 29 November of that year. Up until then, SORAFOM, which was renamed OCORA with the independences of the countries of Françafrique, was dedicated only to radio. The three-day experiment ran from 8:30pm to 11:30pm each evening.

Guy Bernède, the OCORA head who visited Brazzaville in October-November of 1962, returned to Brazaville in February 1963 after a political scandal in Senegal suspended a contract to establish a television station there. This time, he assisted the Congolese team in setting up its regular broadcasts effective March 1963. OCORA delivered air freightened material from France to cover five hours of programming a week, including a half-hour's worth of footage produced by RTF news footage. From April, broadcasts expanded from one night a week to three.

Full transmission commenced in August 1963 on VHF channel 7 in Brazzaville.
