= Radiodiffusion Télévision Congolaise =

- Type: Broadcast
- Country: Congo
- Availability: National
- TV stations: Télé Congo
- Headquarters: Brazzaville
- Broadcast area: Sub-Saharan Africa
- Owner: Government of Republic of the Congo
- Language: French, Kituba, Lingala

The Radiodiffusion Télévision Congolaise is the national broadcaster of the Central African state of Republic of the Congo. Télévision Congolaise is headquartered in the capital city Brazzaville. The comapny edits the national television channel Télé Congo and the national radio station Radio Congo.

== See also ==
- Media of the Republic of the Congo
