= .cg =

Top-level Internet domain for the Republic of the Congo

- Introduced: 14 January 1997
- TLD type: Country code top-level domain
- Status: Active
- Registry: Interpoint Switzerland
- Sponsor: ONPT Congo
- Intended use: Entities connected with the Republic of the Congo
- Actual use: Gets a little bit of use in the Congo
- Registration restrictions: None; Republic of the Congo citizens get one registration free of charge
- Structure: Registrations are made directly at the second level
- Documents: Policy
- DNSSEC: No
- Registry website: nic.cg

.cg is the Internet country code top-level domain (ccTLD) for the Republic of the Congo. It is administered by ONPT Congo and Interpoint Switzerland. Citizens of the Republic of the Congo are entitled to one free domain registration, directly at the second level of .cg. Additional registrations, and registrations by foreigners, have a cost of €225/year as of 2016.
