= France–Republic of the Congo relations =

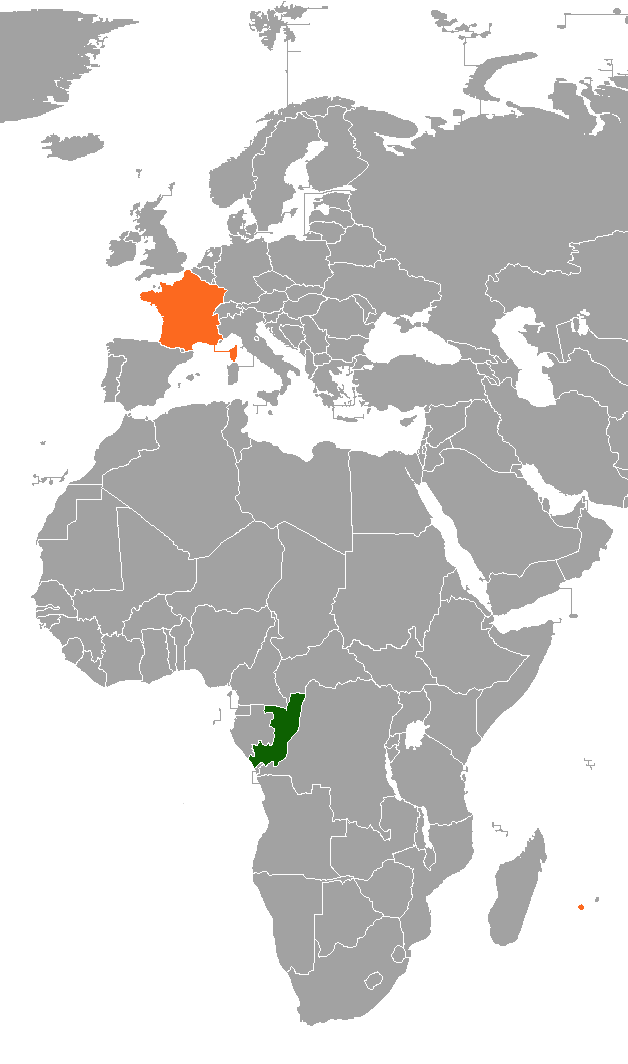
- Congo: France

France–Republic of the Congo relations are the current and historical relationship between the French Republic and the Republic of the Congo. France maintains an embassy in Brazzaville and a consulate in Pointe Noire. France controlled the Republic of the Congo as a colony from the 1880s until the Congo's independence in 1960. Following the collapse of communism worldwide, France has become Congo's most significant external trading partner.

== Colonial relations ==
The area now known as the Republic of the Congo came under French sovereignty in the 1880s. Pierre Savorgnan de Brazza, a French empire builder, competed with agents of Belgian King Leopold's International Congo Association (later Democratic Republic of the Congo) for control of the Congo River basin. Between 1882 and 1891, treaties were secured with all the main local rulers on the river's right bank, placing their lands under French protection. In 1908, France organized French Equatorial Africa (AEF), comprising its colonies of Middle Congo (modern Congo), Gabon, Chad, and Oubangui-Chari (Central African Republic). Brazzaville was selected as the federal capital.

Economic development during the first 50 years of colonial rule in Congo centered on natural resource extraction by private companies. In 1924–34, the Congo-Ocean Railway (CFCO) was built at a considerable human and financial cost, opening the way for growth of the ocean port of Pointe-Noire and towns along its route.

During World War II, the AEF administration sided with Free French President Charles de Gaulle, and Brazzaville became the symbolic capital of Free France from 1940 to 1943. The Brazzaville Conference of 1944 heralded a period of major reform in French colonial policy, including the abolition of forced labor, granting of French citizenship to colonial subjects, decentralization of certain powers, and election of local advisory assemblies. Congo benefited from the postwar expansion of colonial administrative and infrastructure spending as a result of its central geographic location within AEF and the federal capital at Brazzaville.

The Loi Cadre (framework law) of 1956 ended dual voting roles and provided for partial self-government for the individual overseas territories. Ethnic rivalries then produced sharp struggles among the emerging Congolese political parties and sparked severe riots in Brazzaville in 1959. After the September 1958 referendum approving the new French Constitution, AEF was dissolved. Its four territories became autonomous members of the French Community, and Middle Congo was renamed the Congo Republic. Formal independence was granted in August 1960.

== Economic relations ==
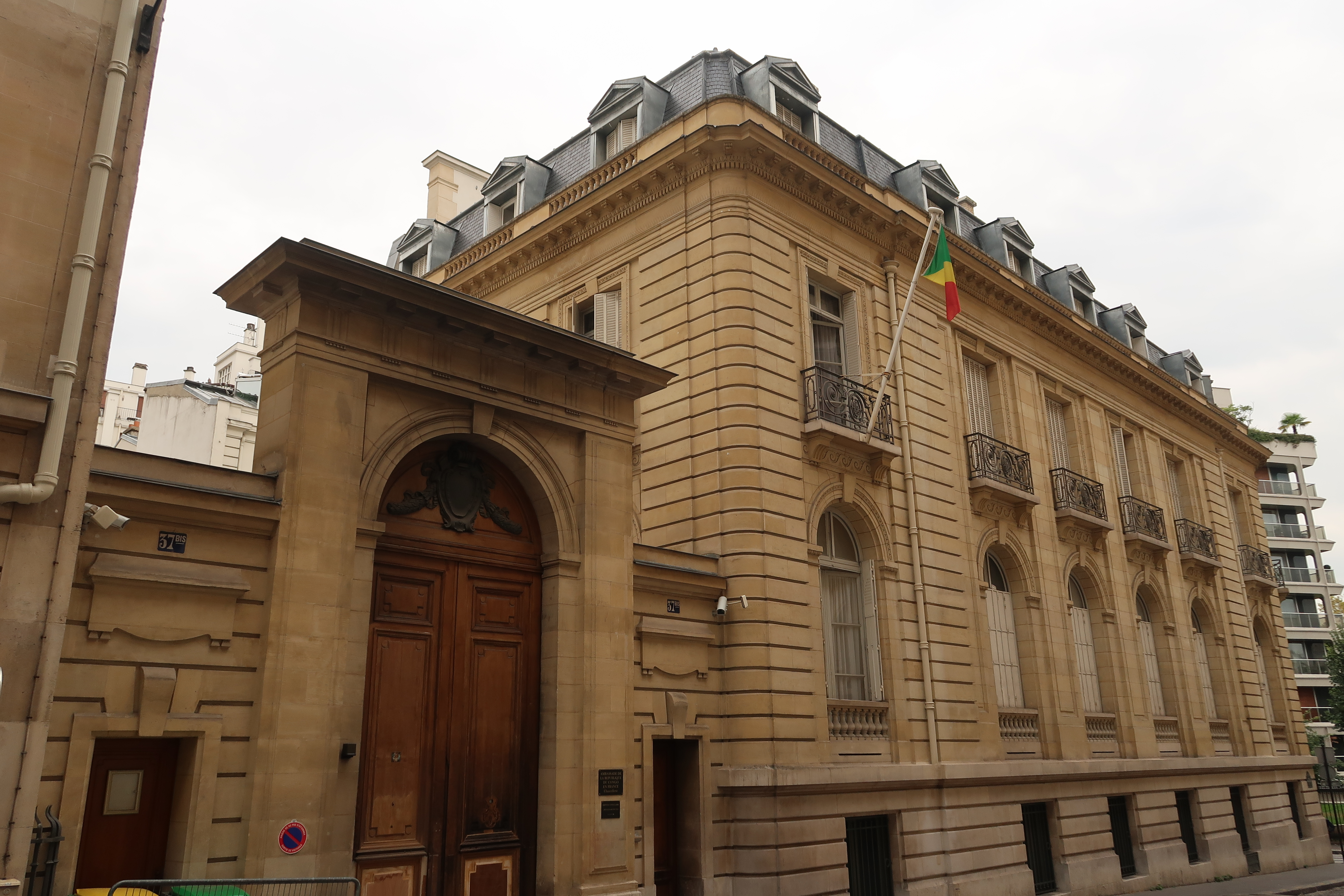
Embassy of Congo in Paris

Following independence, France and Congo maintained a continuing but somewhat subdued relationship, with France offering a variety of cultural, educational, and economic assistance. The principal element in the French-Congolese relationship was the highly successful oil sector investment of the French petroleum parastatal Elf-Aquitaine (now called Total), which entered the Congo in 1968 and has continued to grow. France is now by far Congo's principal external partner, contributing significant amounts of economic assistance, while playing a highly influential role. In 2009, France purchased approximately 9% of Congolese exports, ranking third in total exports; Congo also purchased nearly 21% of its imports from France, which was the most from any one country.
