= Angola–Republic of the Congo border =

International border

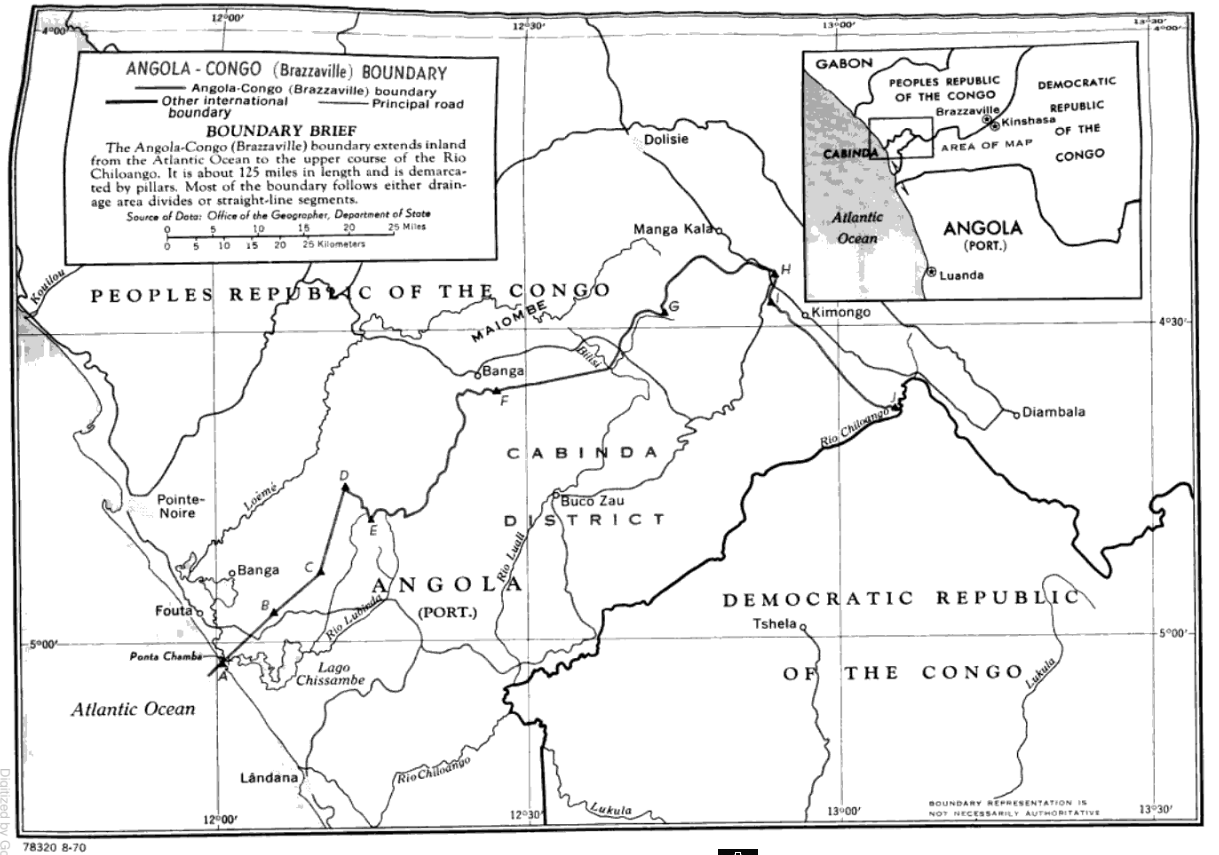
Map of the Angola-Republic of Congo border

The Angola–Republic of the Congo border is 231 km (143 mi) in length and runs from the Atlantic Ocean in the west to the tripoint with the Democratic Republic of the Congo in the east.

== Description ==
The border starts in the west at the Atlantic coast, between Lake Cayo (COG) and Lake Massabi (AGO), proceeding to the north-east via straight line segments and some irregular overland lines. In the vicinity of Manga Missou the border then turns to the south-east via down to the DRC tripoint.

== History ==
Portugal had begun exploring the coast of modern Angola in the 1480s, and over the following century established a number of coastal settlements, gradually expanding into the interior at the expense of the native kingdoms of Kongo, Matamba, Ndongo and others. Portugal had established a tentative presence in what is now Cabinda in 1783, a claim recognised in an Anglo-Portuguese treaty of 22 January 1815. Meanwhile France began settling along the coast of modern Gabon and Congo in the 1830-40s. In the 1880s numerous European powers sought to create colonies in the continent a process known as the Scramble for Africa; this culminated in the Berlin Conference of 1884, in which the European nations concerned agreed upon their respective territorial claims and the rules of engagements going forward. As a result, Portugal's claim to Cabinda was recognised, at the expense of Portugal's giving up a short section of coast to the Congo Free State of Belgian King Leopold II, thereby cutting off Cabinda from mainland Angola. France gained recognition of its coastal settlements, as well as the interior lands explored by Pierre Savorgnan de Brazza for France in Central Africa (roughly equivalent to modern Gabon and the Republic of Congo). France and Portugal signed a border treaty on 12 May 1886 delimiting the western section of the frontier, which was later extended to its current limit by a further treaty of 23 January 1901. France later amalgamated its central African territories into the federal colony of French Equatorial Africa (Afrique équatoriale française, AEF).

France gradually granted more political rights and representation for its African colonies, culminating in the granting of broad internal autonomy to each colony in 1958 within the framework of the French Community. Eventually, in August 1960 France granted French Congo full independence. Portugal however firmly resisted the wave of decolonisation in Africa, making Angola a legal part of Portugal in 1951. Angolan nationalists began fighting for independence in 1961, achieved in 1975 following a revolution in Portugal. Cabinda meanwhile sought to establish a separate state, kick-starting the Cabinda War.

== Settlements near the border ==
=== Angola ===
- Tando Limbo
- Miconge

=== Republic of the Congo ===
- Banga
- Manga Missou
- Tsatou
- Kimongo

== See also ==
- Belgium–Democratic Republic of the Congo relations
- France–Republic of the Congo relations
- Angola–Portugal relations
- Democratic Republic of the Congo–Republic of the Congo relations
- Angola–Democratic Republic of the Congo border
