= Human trafficking in the Republic of the Congo =

Child trafficking in Congo

In 2009, The Republic of the Congo (ROC) was a destination and transit country for children subjected to trafficking in persons for the purposes of forced labor and forced prostitution. Most sources agreed that up to 80 percent of all trafficked children originated from Benin, with girls comprising 90 percent of that group. Togo, Mali, Guinea, Cameroon, Democratic Republic of the Congo, and Senegal were also sources of victims found in the Congolese Republic. Internally trafficked children represented 10 percent of all child victims, the majority of which originated from the Pool region.

Many child victims were subjected to forced labor, including in domestic work, market vending and fishing; girls were also exploited in the sex trade. Child victims generally experienced harsh treatment, long work hours, and almost no access to education or health services; they received little or no remuneration for their work. Other village children, however, lived voluntarily with extended relatives in cities, attend school, and did housework in exchange for food, in a traditional cultural and familial pattern that id not entail abuse.

In 2009, the Government of the Republic of the Congo did not fully comply with the minimum standards for the elimination of trafficking; however, it made significant efforts to do so, despite limited resources. The Senate passed the Child Protection Code in August 2009, which prescribes penalties for trafficking offenders; this law is pending Presidential signature. The government also developed and began implementation of a national anti-trafficking action plan, and the Ministry of Labor investigated nine new cases of child trafficking in 2009. However, eight prosecutions based on child trafficking charges filed previously remained pending and did not come to a conclusion or result in convictions. The government did not identify trafficking victims in 2009. Most of the government’s anti-trafficking activities remain dependent on international donor funding.

The U.S. State Department's Office to Monitor and Combat Trafficking in Persons placed the country in "Tier 3" in 2017. The country was on the Tier 2 Watch List in 2023.

In mid-2024, the ROC is not a party to the 2000 UN TIP Protocol.

== Prosecution (2009) ==
The Government of the ROC demonstrated minimal law enforcement efforts to combat trafficking during the reporting period. The government neither prosecuted trafficking offenses nor convicted trafficking offenders in 2009.

The Child Protection Law, which prohibits and prescribes punishment for child trafficking, was passed by the Senate in August 2009, but was still pending presidential signature at the time of the report. The law was subsequently promulgated on June 14, 2010. Chapter 2, Article 60 of the law prohibits the trafficking, sale, trading, and exploitation of children, while Article 115 prescribes penalties of forced labor and a fine of between 1 million and 10 million CFA francs. Pimping of children is punishable under Penal Code Article 344, but its prescribed penalty of up to two years' imprisonment and a fine was considered insufficiently stringent and not commensurate with penalties prescribed by Congolese law for other serious crimes, such as rape. The trafficking of adults was not covered under Congolese law at the time.

The Ministry of Labor investigated, but did not prosecute, nine new cases of child trafficking in 2009. Eight prosecutions based on child trafficking charges filed one or two years earlier remained pending, and none resulted in a conviction.

The Ministry of Social Affairs sustained partnerships with local NGOs and UNICEF to provide training to 40 of the ministry's investigators on recognizing victims of trafficking and to support judicial clinics. The government also partnered with UNICEF to train police officers to recognize trafficking cases. The government showed no evidence of involvement in or tolerance of trafficking on any level.

== Protection (2009) ==
The ROC government provided minimal protection services to trafficking victims, and did not identify any victims during the reporting period. Investigators employed by the Ministry of Social Affairs reportedly utilized a formal identification and registration process to assist victims of trafficking. The government did not ensure that victims were provided access to care facilities, except through funding of the shelter, Espace Jarot, which provided care for a small number of at-risk children, including trafficking victims; in practice, few victims had access to care facilities.

In partnership with representatives of the consulates of Benin, Togo, and the Democratic Republic of the Congo, police and other law enforcement officials formed a working group to identify trafficking patterns and to facilitate the return of trafficked children to their home countries, but had not yet utilized the group to repatriate any child victims. Foreign victims had the same access to the center as Congolese nationals, though there was no access to legal, medical, or psychological services.

Some legal services were available to trafficking victims through six child judicial clinics hosted by staff from the Ministries of Social Affairs, Justice, and Health; trafficking victims could file administrative claims against their alleged traffickers at these clinics. Though there was at least one clinic located in each region run by government civil servants and lawyers, they were neither open regularly nor operated with regular business hours; it was unknown whether these clinics provided legal services to child trafficking victims during the year. The government offered foreign trafficking victims temporary residency status as an alternative to immediate repatriation, but was not known to have used these provisions in 2009.

Trafficking victims were not usually jailed or otherwise penalized for unlawful acts committed as a direct result of being trafficked. Some victims, however, were detained, arrested, or held in protective custody, and did not benefit from any formal referral process to institutions offering short- or long-term care.

The government encouraged victims to assist in the investigation and prosecution of their traffickers, but many elected not to participate in these law enforcement actions due to fear of possible retribution from traffickers or because they did not consider their offenders guilty. The government did not provide services for repatriated Congolese victims of trafficking.

== Prevention (2009) ==
The government maintained its efforts begun in 2008 to raise awareness and build support for combating human trafficking in the Brazzaville and Pointe Noire areas.

In 2009, the Ministry of Health (MOH), in partnership with UNICEF, launched an anti-trafficking public awareness campaign in Pointe Noire involving not only government officials, but also security and diplomatic staff from the consulates of neighboring countries and leaders from local Muslim and Christian communities. Organizers made full use of banners - the most common advertising medium - to stress the point that human trafficking is illegal and will be punished.

In April 2010, the Minister of Social Affairs and Humanitarian Action co-hosted with UNICEF a conference in Pointe Noire to highlight the problem of trafficking in children. Also during the reporting period, the MOH, with support from UNICEF, also began implementation of the government’s 2009–2010 National Plan of Action. Under this plan, UNICEF trained MOH representatives to serve as trainers; these trainers then presented anti-trafficking workshops to local NGOs.

The government did not monitor migration patterns for trafficking, and it did not take measures to reduce the demand for commercial sex acts during 2009.

== See also ==
- Human rights in the Republic of the Congo
