= Timeline of strikes in 1976 =

Strikes in 1976

A number of labour strikes, labour disputes, and other industrial actions occurred in 1976.

== Background ==
A labour strike is a work stoppage caused by the mass refusal of employees to work. This can include wildcat strikes, which are done without union authorisation, and slowdown strikes, where workers reduce their productivity while still carrying out minimal working duties. It is usually a response to employee grievances, such as low pay or poor working conditions. Strikes can also occur to demonstrate solidarity with workers in other workplaces or pressure governments to change policies.

== Timeline ==
=== Continuing strikes from 1975 ===
- 1975–77 Le Parisien Libéré strike, 29-month strike by Le Parisien Libéré printers in France.
- 1973–76 LIP strikes, at the LIP in France.
- 1975–1976 Pittsburgh teachers' strike
- 1975–80 Sonacotra rent strike, rent strike by immigrant workers in France.
- 1975–1976 Washington Post pressmen's strike

=== January ===
- 1976 Honolulu nurses' strike, 19-day strike by nurses in Honolulu, Hawaiʻi.

=== February ===
- 1976 UNOG strike, strike by United Nations Office at Geneva workers over wages.
- 1976 Warilla High School strike, 4-week strike by Warilla High School teachers in Australia.

=== March ===
- Land Day, general strike in Palestine following moves by the Israeli government to seize Arab-owned land; since annually commemorated.
- March 24 strike, in the Republic of the Congo.
- Vitoria massacre

=== April ===
- 1976 US rubberworkers' strike

=== May ===
- 1976 University of Fribourg strike, 3-week strike by journalism students at the University of Fribourg in Switzerland after the firing of a faculty member.

=== June ===
- 1976 CASAW wildcat strike, wildcat strike by Alcan smelters in Canada.
- Irish bank strikes (1966–1976), third of the related three strikes in Ireland.
- June 1976 protests, including strikes, in the Polish People's Republic, against increase in the price of basic commodities.

=== July ===
- 1976 California cannery strike
- 1976 Seattle nurses strike, in the United States.

=== August ===
- Grunwick dispute, in the United Kingdom.
- 1976 Israeli VAT protests, protests including strikes in Israel against introduction of value added tax and in Palestine against imposition of the tax in the Occupied Palestinian Territories.

=== September ===
- 1976 Colombian doctors' strike, 51-day strike by doctors in Colombia.
- 1976 Dubied strike, by Edouard Dubied & Co workers in Switzerland.

=== October ===
- 1976 Canadian general strike
- 1976 Peruvian fishermen's strike, strike by fishermen in Peru over plans to privatise the Peruvian fishing fleet.

=== November ===
- 1976–77 Roca radiators strike, strike by Roca workers in Spain.

=== December ===
- 1976–77 Palestinian prisoners' protests, series of protests and strikes by Palestinians in Israeli custody.

== List of lockouts in 1976 ==
- 1976 Major League Baseball lockout
