= M 22 =

- Location of Congo-Brazzaville
- Active: 1972-73
- Country: Congo-Brazzaville
- Allegiance: Left-wing
- Role: Guerrilla warfare
- Garrison/HQ: Mountains and jungles of Congo-Brazzaville

Commanders
- Notable commanders: Ange Diawara

M 22 (short for Mouvement 22 de fevrier, 'February 22 Movement') was a political movement in Congo-Brazzaville. It was active in 1972 and 73 before its guerrilla base was compromised and most of its cadre arrested including its leader Ange Diawara.

In 1976 some M 22 members were reincorporated into public life and appointed in positions of power after a pardon by Congo leader, Ngouabi. M22 remained a force in the countries politics until the 1989 party congress when all M 22 presence was removed from the Central Committee.

== History ==
=== Rebellion ===
M 22 emerged from the left wing of the governing Congolese Party of Labour (PCT). The movement was violently suppressed, and the purges against accused associates of the movement had a profound impact on Congolese politics. A majority of the political cadres of the country were purged in the anti-M 22 campaign.

The movement was formed by followers of Ange Diawara, a leader of the left-wing faction of the Congolese Party of Labour, who had led a failed coup attempt against the government of Marien Ngouabi on February 22, 1972. The movement gathered a grouping of former youth militias of the National Movement of the Revolution. After the uprising had been quashed, Diawara and his followers regrouped and formed a guerrilla base in the Pool region. Diawara borrowed inspiration from Che Guevara and the Union of the Peoples of Cameroon. The name 'M 22' was taken from the document Autocritique du M 22 ('Self-criticism of M 22', authored by Diawara), which was circulated clandestinely in Brazzaville. Parallel to the rural guerrilla movement a clandestine urban opposition network (consisting of student activists and militaries) developed, also under the direction of Diawara.

In early 1973 the movement suffered a serious set-back as the guerrilla base was infiltrated. Diawara and other leaders fled to neighbouring Zaire. On February 23, 1973, following fear that a second coup attempt would be made by Diawara on the first anniversary of the 1972 coup, a wave of arrests was made in Brazzaville against supposed conspirators of Diawara. Amongst the arrested were many prominent figures, politicians and leaders of mass organizations. For example, Pascal Lissouba (former Prime Minister) and Sylvain Bemba (at the time the Minister of Information) were among the jailed. Diawara and other M 22 leaders were arrested and executed. Their mutilated corpses were displayed at the national stadium. Bemba admitted complicity in the coup plot at his trial in April and, "because of his international standing", was given a suspended three-year sentence. Lissouba was acquitted of all charges at the trial and would later become the nation's president in 1992.

=== Post-pardon ===
In 1976, some M 22 dissidents were reincorporated into public life, benefitting from a pardon by Ngouabi after the March 24, 1974 general strike. At the time Camille Boungou was the leader of M 22.

In the PCT Central Committee formed in 1979, there were five persons from M 22, Camille Boungou, Lt. Célestin Goma-Foutou (who had also been a member in the 1974 Central Committee), Benoît Moundéllé-Ngolo, Bernard Combo-Matsiona and Alphonse Fongui.

During the latter half of the 1980s, the M 22 opposed the introduction of Structural Adjustment Programmes. At the 1989 party congress, all M 22 presence was removed from the Central Committee. Later, the same year Bernard Combo-Matsiona was elected president of the National Assembly (the last M 22 member in high-ranking position).

== Bibliography ==
Notes

References

- Bazenguissa-Ganga, Rémy (1997). Les voies du politique au Congo: essai de sociologie historique (in French) (1997 ed.). Paris: Karthala. ISBN 2-86537-739-3. - Total pages: 459
- Daloz, Jean-Pascal; Quantin, Patrick (January 1997). Transitions démocratiques africaines: dynamiques et contraintes (1990-1994) (in French) (1997 ed.). Paris: Karthala. ISBN 2-86537-714-8. - Total pages: 313
- Tsiba, Michel-Ange (2009). Pourquoi la violence refuse l'Etat et la République au Congo Brazzaville? (in French) (2009 ed.). Editions Publibook. ISBN 978-2-7483-4717-3. - Total pages: 548
- Rupture-Solidarité, (Organization) (1999). Congo-Brazzaville: dérives politiques, catastrophe humanitaire, désirs de paix (in French) (1999 ed.). Paris: Karthala. ISBN 2-86537-982-5. - Total pages: 239
