= Aimé Emmanuel Yoka =

Congolese politician (1931/1932–2025)

Ministry of Foreign Affairs
- In office 28 December 1980 – 18 April 2025
- President: Sassou Nguesso

Director of the Cabinet of the President
- In office ?–1988
- President: Sassou Nguesso

Minister of Mines, Energy, and Posts and Telecommunications
- In office August 1988 – 1990
- President: Sassou Nguesso

Mayor of Brazzaville
- In office 1997–1999
- President: Sassou Nguesso

Ambassador to Morocco
- In office 1999–2002
- President: Sassou Nguesso

Director of the Cabinet of the President
- In office 22 August 2002 – 22 May 2007
- President: Sassou Nguesso
- Preceded by: Gérard Bitsindou
- Succeeded by: Firmin Ayessa

Minister of State for Justice and Human Rights
- In office 3 March 2007 – 30 April 2016
- President: Sassou Nguesso

Personal details
- Born: 1931 or 1932 Oyo, French Congo, French Equatorial Africa
- Died: 18 April 2025 (aged 93)
- Party: Congolese Party of Labour
- Relatives: Sassou Nguesso (nephew)

Aimé Emmanuel Yoka (1931 or 1932 – 18 April 2025) was a Congolese politician who served in the government of Congo-Brazzaville as Minister of State for Justice from 2007 to 2016. He had earlier been Director of the Cabinet of President Denis Sassou Nguesso from 2002 to 2007.

== Political career ==
Yoka was born at Oyo, located in the north of Congo-Brazzaville; he was the uncle of President Denis Sassou Nguesso and a lawyer by profession.

Under Sassou Nguesso, Yoka was first appointed to the government on 28 December 1980 as Minister-Delegate for Cooperation, working at the Presidency. Subsequently, he was Director of the Cabinet of the President before being appointed as Minister of Mines, Energy, and Posts and Telecommunications in August 1988. He was elected to the Central Committee of the Congolese Labour Party (PCT) for the first time at the PCT's Fourth Ordinary Congress on 26–31 July 1989, and he was retained in his ministerial post in the government appointed on 13 August 1989. He left the government when the PCT's single-party rule collapsed in 1990–1991.

Shortly after the outbreak of the 1997 civil war on 5 June 1997, Yoka was included on the National Mediation Committee. When Sassou Nguesso returned to power in October 1997, ousting President Pascal Lissouba, he scrapped the elected local authorities that had been put in place under Lissouba and directly appointed new local authorities. Sassou Nguesso appointed Yoka as mayor of Brazzaville, the capital; Yoka served in that post from 1997 to 1999, and he was Congo-Brazzaville's Ambassador to Morocco from 1999 to 2002. During that period, Yoka also chaired the commission responsible for drafting the 2002 constitution.

On 19 August 2002, Yoka was again appointed Director of the Cabinet of President Sassou Nguesso, with the rank of Minister; accordingly, he succeeded Gérard Bitsindou in that capacity on 22 August 2002. As Director of the Presidential Cabinet, Yoka was described as "very active and very independent". He was subsequently appointed to the government as Minister of State for Justice and Human Rights on 3 March 2007, and he was succeeded as Director of the Cabinet by Firmin Ayessa on 22 May 2007.

Sassou Nguesso, acting on Yoka's recommendation as Minister of Justice, commuted all death sentences to life in prison with hard labor in August 2007.

After a French group, Zoe's Ark, made an abortive attempt to fly children out of Chad to Europe, causing a major scandal, Yoka announced on 31 October 2007 that the Congolese government was suspending international adoptions. Explaining this decision, he cited the Chadian incident as well as the adoptions of 17 Congolese children by Spanish families, which occurred shortly before the Chadian incident.

Yoka faced criticism from human rights advocates in late 2007 for inaction on a draft law on the protection of indigenous peoples, despite the government's apparent support of it.

Prior to the July 2009 presidential election, Yoka was President of the Preparatory Committee for the National Initiative for Peace (INP), a political association promoting Sassou Nguesso's re-election while stressing the importance of peace. At the association's debut rally in Brazzaville on 28 February 2009, Yoka introduced it to the public, explaining the purpose and approach of the INP. After Sassou Nguesso won re-election, he retained Yoka in his post as Minister of State for Justice and Human Rights on 15 September 2009. The government was also reorganized into four broad sectors, with one minister assigned responsibility for coordinating each of the four sectors; Yoka was one of the ministers chosen as a coordinator and was assigned the sovereignty sector.

In the July–August 2012 parliamentary election, Yoka was elected to the National Assembly as the PCT candidate in Vindza constituency, located in the Pool Department. He won the seat in the second round of voting, receiving 56.05% of the vote.

In the National Assembly on 25 April 2014, opposition leader Pascal Tsaty-Mabiala asked Yoka a question in which he claimed that it was an "open secret" that President Sassou Nguesso wanted the constitution to be changed to enable him to run for another term. Alleging that the goal was being pursued through "shameless manipulation", Tsaty-Mabiala argued that the government should hold a national dialogue on the matter. Yoka replied that such a dialogue would be unnecessary and that it would be simpler for Parliament to debate the constitution, and he accordingly asked Justin Koumba, the President of the National Assembly, to initiate a parliamentary debate on the matter.

After Sassou Nguesso's victory in the March 2016 presidential election, Yoka was dismissed from the government on 30 April 2016. He was succeeded at the Ministry of Justice by Pierre Mabiala on 4 May. Yoka then returned to his seat in the National Assembly.

== Death ==
Yoka died on 18 April 2025, at the age of 93.
