= Adélaïde Moundélé-Ngollo =

Republic of the Congo politician (born 1944)

Yvonne Adélaïde Moundélé-Ngollo (born 1944) is a Congolese politician who has served in the government of Congo-Brazzaville as Minister of Small and Medium-Sized Enterprises since 2007. She was previously Director-General of Hydro-Congo from 1998 to 1999 and Minister of Trade from 2002 to 2007.

== Political career ==
Moundélé-Ngollo was born in Brazzaville. She is the daughter of Édouard Mougany, who was a member of the National Assembly and an ally of President Fulbert Youlou. Her first husband was Ange Diawara, a military officer and early leader of the Congolese Labour Party (PCT), who was executed in 1973 for his role in the 1972 coup plot. She later married another politician, Benoît Moundélé-Ngollo, who served as a government minister, as Mayor of Brazzaville, and as Prefect of Brazzaville.

After holding high-level posts at Hydro-Congo, the national oil exploration and exploitation company (including serving as Director of the Department of Studies and Planning from 1986 to 1994), Moundélé-Ngollo was an Adviser to the Minister of Hydrocarbons from 1994 to 1998. She also attended the United Nations Fourth World Conference on Women as a delegate from Congo-Brazzaville in September 1995. Moundélé-Ngollo was the Director-General of Hydro-Congo from December 1998 to December 1999. She later became a member of the National Executive Bureau of Club 2002, which supports President Denis Sassou Nguesso and is led by his nephew, Willy Sassou Nguesso.

After the May–June 2002 parliamentary election, Moundélé-Ngollo was appointed as Minister of Trade, Consumption, and Supplies on 18 August 2002, and she succeeded Pierre-Damien Boussoukou Boumba in that position on 21 August. In late 2002 and early 2003, she played a key role in peace initiatives regarding the Ninja rebellion, led by Pasteur Ntoumi; a peace agreement was signed on 17 March 2003, and she became a member of the Monitoring Committee of the Convention for Peace and National Reconstruction.

In the June–August 2007 parliamentary election, Moundélé-Ngollo was elected to the National Assembly as the Club 2002 candidate in the first constituency of Mindouli, located in the Pool Region. After placing second with 42.10% of the vote in the first round, she faced Congolese Movement for Democracy and Integral Development (MCDDI) candidate Jean-Claude Massoba in the second round and won the seat. After the election, she was moved from her position as Minister of Trade, Consumption, and Supplies to that of Minister of Small and Medium-Sized Enterprises, in charge of the Craft Industry, on 30 December 2007. Her alternate, Auguste Mpassi-Mouba, took up her seat in the National Assembly.

Mpassi-Mouba died on 16 October 2009, thereby leaving the seat for Mindouli 1 vacant. To resume her seat in the National Assembly, it would have been necessary for Moundélé-Ngollo to resign from the government, and she apparently did not want to do so; consequently, a by-election was called for July 2010 to replace Mpassi-Mouba. Constitutionally, the matter was considered somewhat unclear, as the by-election was being called to replace an alternate while the titular deputy was still alive. Moundélé-Ngollo stood again as a candidate in the by-election; because it was understood that she would remain in the government, her alternate was effectively the real candidate.
