= Claude-Ernest Ndalla =

Congolese politician (born 1937)

Claude-Ernest Ndalla (born 25 May 1937) is a Congolese politician. First coming to prominence as a radical youth leader in 1960s Republic of Congo, he was one of the leading members of the Congolese Labour Party (PCT) in the period immediately following its founding in 1969, but after a few years his career fell into a long decline due to factional struggles within the PCT. Later, he served in the government of Congo-Brazzaville as Minister of Youth Redeployment and Sports from 1997 to 1999, and he has been a Special Adviser to President Denis Sassou Nguesso since 2003.

== Political career in the 1960s and 1970s ==
Ndalla was born in Brazzaville in 1937 and studied mathematics at the University of Toulouse in France. At Toulouse, he was known for his appetite and was nicknamed Graille, or crow. Back in Congo-Brazzaville, he quickly attained a prominent place in the radicalized political scene of the period that followed the August 1963 ouster of Fulbert Youlou, and he started a magazine, Dipanda.

In 1964, Ndalla was included on the executive committee of the Youth of the National Movement of the Revolution (JMNR), the radical youth wing of the ruling National Movement of the Revolution (MNR), and he acquired a reputation as a radical leftist and ideologue. On 6 April 1965, President Alphonse Massemba-Débat appointed Ndalla as Secretary of State at the Presidency in charge of Youth and Civic Education. However, Massemba-Débat dismissed Ndalla from that post in December 1965. In light of Ndalla's prominent identification with the JMNR, his dismissal indicated that the JMNR had lost some influence, but Ambroise Noumazalaye—a strong advocate for the JMNR—was appointed as Prime Minister in April 1966.

Ndalla was the Director of Congolese Radio and Television Broadcasting from 1967 to 1969, and he was appointed as Ambassador to the People's Republic of China in 1969; in the latter post, he was also assigned responsibility for relations with North Vietnam and North Korea. He arrived in Beijing on 24 April 1969 and was received by the Chinese leaders Mao Zedong and Lin Biao at Tiananmen Square on 1 May 1969. He held a reception in Beijing on 15 August 1969 to mark the sixth anniversary of the revolution; various high-ranking Chinese officials, including Premier Zhou Enlai, attended.

Along with various other prominent politicians, including Massemba-Débat and Pascal Lissouba, Ndalla was put on trial by President Marien Ngouabi in 1969 for involvement in the murder of government officials, but he was acquitted on 21 November 1969. He then spent a few weeks at his diplomatic post in Beijing before returning home.

In December 1969, a new ruling Marxist-Leninist ruling party was created under President Ngouabi: the Congolese Labour Party (PCT). Ndalla was one of the party's founding members; he was included in the PCT's original Political Bureau and was designated as First Secretary in charge of Organization, in which capacity he was responsible for managing internal organizational matters. Ndalla represented the far-left faction of the PCT, and his designation as First Secretary bolstered the far-left while positioning him as "Ngouabi's principal rival", as he was effectively the second-ranking figure in the PCT regime. Despite his clear affinity for China and Maoism, Ndalla led a Congolese delegation that visited the Soviet Union in June 1970.

Student protests and a strike led Ngouabi to sideline the PCT's radical leftist leaders, who were associated with Maoism, in November 1971. Ndalla and another high-ranking radical, Ange Diawara, were among those affected by Ngouabi's move. Diawara then led an unsuccessful left-wing coup attempt against Ngouabi on 22 February 1972. Ndalla and the others who supported a far-left, pro-Chinese political line were known as the 22 February Movement (M-22). Implicated in the plot, Ndalla was tried along with 177 others and sentenced to life in prison on 25 March 1972. President Ngouabi later released him as part of an amnesty, along with others from the M-22, in September 1975. Following his release, Ndalla faced difficulties and it took him some time to find work.

President Ngouabi was assassinated under mysterious circumstances in March 1977. Various prominent political figures suspected of disloyalty were immediately brought before a military tribunal and tried for complicity in the assassination. Massemba-Débat was executed, while Ndalla and Lissouba were among those sentenced to life in prison.

== Political career from the 1980s to the 1990s ==
Under Denis Sassou Nguesso, the M-22 was partially rehabilitated and regained influence beginning in 1980, to the point that some M-22 figures were considered part of "the backbone" of the PCT regime. By that time, the M-22 was considerably less radical, although still ideologically Marxist. Like the PCT in general, the M-22 was "clearly dominated by northerners", and it was the northern M-22 leaders, rather than southerners like Ndalla, who most clearly benefited from Sassou Nguesso's favor.

Ndalla was arrested prior to a PCT party congress in 1984. At the time, Sassou Nguesso was trying to assert his authority in the PCT leadership against a hard-line, pro-Soviet faction led by François-Xavier Katali, and it was believed that Sassou Nguesso wanted to prevent Ndalla from encouraging other M-22 southerners to support Katali's faction. The arrest of Ndalla was part of a series of successful moves by Sassou Nguesso in 1984, culminating in his victory over the Katali faction at the party congress.

While in detention, Ndalla was recorded on video saying that Jean-Pierre Thystère Tchicaya, a key figure in the PCT regime, had orchestrated bomb attacks that occurred in Brazzaville in 1982. Those bomb attacks killed nine people and wounded 92 others. Sassou Nguesso used Ndalla's claim as evidence when he launched a sudden attack on Thystère Tchicaya at the 1984 congress. Although Ndalla told a party commission sent to investigate the matter that his incriminating statements were untrue and that he had only made them to avoid being tortured, Thystère Tchicaya was removed from the PCT leadership on the basis of Ndalla's claim.

Ndalla was tried before the Revolutionary Court of Justice for his alleged role in the 1982 bomb attacks and was sentenced to death in August 1986. Ndalla had no right to appeal the decision, which was criticized by international human rights organizations such as Amnesty International and the International Federation of Human Rights on the grounds that the trial was unfair and the evidence of guilt was insufficient. The death sentence was never carried out, however, and Sassou Nguesso commuted Ndalla's sentence to life imprisonment with hard labor as a gesture of clemency to mark the 25th anniversary of the 1963 revolution in August 1988.

Two years later, on the 27th anniversary of the revolution, Sassou Nguesso granted Ndalla and other political prisoners an amnesty on 14 August 1990; he was accordingly released from prison on 15 August. By that time, Sassou Nguesso and the PCT regime were struggling to maintain control of the country amidst increasingly vocal demands for democratic reform, and Ndalla wasted no time in returning to the political stage by adding his voice to those calling for reform. As a delegate to the February–June 1991 Sovereign National Conference, Ndalla criticized the record of the PCT regime.

== Political career since the 1990s ==
Ndalla was associated with opposition leader Bernard Kolélas and his party, the Congolese Movement for Democracy and Integral Development (MCDDI), during the 1990s, and he helped to recruit fighters for the Ninja militia loyal to Kolélas. During the June–October 1997 civil war, Ndalla objected to the MCDDI's moves toward an alliance with President Pascal Lissouba and defected to the side of Denis Sassou Nguesso and his rebel Cobra militia.

The civil war ended in victory for the Cobras on 15 October 1997; Lissouba and Kolélas were ousted and Sassou Nguesso regained control of the country. When Sassou Nguesso formed a government on 2 November 1997, he appointed Ndalla as Minister of Youth Redeployment and Sports, in charge of Civic Instruction. He was not included in the next government, appointed on 12 January 1999; subsequently he was appointed as Political Delegate of the Head of State, in which capacity he acted as Sassou Nguesso's representative.

Ndalla strongly backed Sassou Nguesso when the latter stood as a candidate for the March 2002 presidential election. He was present for the launch of the support committee for Sassou Nguesso's candidacy on 6 February 2002, and on that occasion he elaborated his view that Sassou Nguesso was "a symbol of hope, peace and freedom" by symbolically assigning a positive characteristic to each letter of the name "Sassou", in French: "S is for security (sécurité), A is for joy (allégresse), S is for concern for others (souci des autres), S is for the salvage of the property of the people of Mfilou (sauvetage des biens des gens de Mfilou), O is for organizer of peace (organisateur de la paix), and U is for national unity (unité nationale)". Ndalla subsequently worked on Sassou Nguesso's campaign as head of the coordination of the support committee for the Mfilou district of Brazzaville.

In his capacity as Political Delegate of the Head of State, Ndalla presided over a meeting of the Youth Committee for Peace in the Pool on 24–28 April 2002. The meeting called on the security forces to show restraint in the Pool Region while also urging Ninja rebels to disarm. He was present at the Marien Ngouabi Mausoleum for a ceremony at which the eternal flame commemorating Ngouabi, which had been extinguished during the 1997 war, was rekindled on 11 November 2002.

On 30 January 2003, Sassou Nguesso appointed Ndalla as a Special Adviser to the President. Ndalla accompanied Claude-Alphonse Nsilou, the Minister of Urban Affairs, during the latter's campaign for a seat in the June 2007 parliamentary election, calling on the people of Bacongo's second constituency to give Nsilou a majority in the first round of voting.

Speaking in mid-2007, Ndalla expressed dismay regarding the poor state of Congo-Brazzaville's prison conditions and said that the system needed more money. He also noted that the prisons could cause increased criminalization among inmates, making them more dangerous to society upon release.

On 1 October 2008, Ndalla participated in the founding of the Convention for the Rebirth of Congo (CRC), a pro-Sassou Nguesso political grouping that was created through an agreement signed by five parties, eight associations, and nine individuals. Gabriel Bokilo was designated as President of the CRC, while Ndalla became its First Vice-President. In Bokilo's absence, Ndalla chaired an ordinary session of the CRC National Coordination on 15 November 2008.

At a forum for peace in Congo-Brazzaville, held in Paris in April 2009, Ndalla gave a presentation on "the major political currents in Congo from 1956 to the present day". Drawing on decades of political experience, Ndalla argued in his presentation that democracy had to be developed gradually and consolidated through peace.

In an October 2009 presidential decree, Sassou Nguesso barred top officials from travelling abroad for the remainder of 2009 except in cases of urgency. Speaking to the BBC, Ndalla explained that some officials were taking needless and expensive trips outside the country, sometimes merely for their own pleasure. He said that henceforth travel plans would have to be reviewed and they would be allowed only if they were considered to be worthwhile.

== Poetry ==
Ndalla began writing poetry when he was 12 years old and published several collections of poetry later in life. A dedication ceremony for his works was held on 9 March 2006 in the presence of various literary and academic features, including the foremost Congolese poet, Jean-Baptiste Tati-Loutard.

== Awards and honors ==
As a former Minister of Sports, Ndalla was awarded an honorary medal by the Supreme Council of Sport in Africa in December 2007.
