= Mabiala =

Mabiala is a surname. Notable people with the surname include:

- Charlevy Mabiala (born 1996), Congolese footballer
- Larrys Mabiala (born 1987), French footballer
- Pascal Tsaty Mabiala, Congolese politician
- Pierre Mabiala, Congolese politician
- Youlou Mabiala (born 1947), Congolese musician
