= Pierre Mabiala =

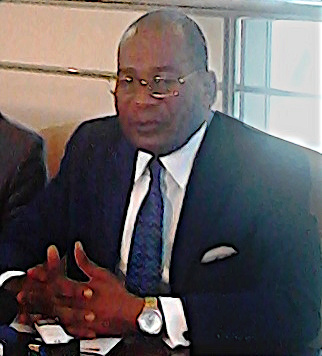
Mabiala in 2016

Pierre Mabiala is a Congolese politician who has served in the government of the Congo-Brazzaville as Minister of Land Affairs since 2017. He serves in Anatole Collinet Makosso's government. Previously he was a Deputy in the National Assembly of Congo-Brazzaville from 2002 to 2007, a Senator from 2008 to 2009, Minister of Land Affairs from 2009 to 2016, and Minister of Justice from 2016 to 2017.

== Political career ==
Mabiala, a native of Niari Department, is a lawyer by profession and worked as a lawyer for the Congolese state in the 1990s. In the May–June 2002 parliamentary election, he was elected to the National Assembly as an independent candidate in Makabana constituency, located in Niari. He won the seat in a second round of voting. Mabiala was one of several deputies elected by the National Assembly to sit on the High Court of Justice in January 2003.

Jean-Pierre Thystere Tchicaya, the President of the National Assembly, and Justin Lekoundzou, the President of the Parliamentary Group of the Presidential Majority, sent a letter to President Denis Sassou Nguesso on 24 March 2007 that called for the creation of an independent national electoral commission. However, the deputies of the Presidential Majority, including Mabiala, unanimously rejected their position at a meeting on 11 April 2007, and after the meeting, Mabiala read a statement on behalf of the deputies explaining that they did not support the call made by Thystere-Tchicaya and Lekoundzou. Shortly afterward, Sassou Nguesso's Congolese Labour Party (PCT) signed an electoral pact with the Congolese Movement for Democracy and Integral Development (MCDDI) on 24 April 2007; Mabiala, a member of the PCT, answered questions from the press regarding the agreement.

In the June–August 2007 parliamentary election, Mabiala stood again as a candidate in Makabana. He received 40.98% of the vote in the first round, well ahead of second-place candidate Nimi Madingou of the opposition Pan-African Union for Social Democracy (UPADS), who received 21.65%. Nevertheless, Madingou won by a large margin in the second round, receiving 66.60% of the vote. Like many other defeated candidates, Mabiala appealed the matter to the Constitutional Court. The Court considered Mabiala's appeal in October 2007, but it was rejected, along with most of the other appeals, on 26 October 2007.

Having lost his seat in the National Assembly, Mabiala instead stood as a candidate of the Rally of the Presidential Majority (RMP), the coalition of parties supporting Sassou Nguesso, in the indirect August 2008 Senate election. He received 78 votes in Niari Region, placing second and therefore winning the second of Niari's six available seats. As part of the customary bureau d'âge, he and Jean-Nicolas Mongala assisted the oldest Senator, Jean-Pierre Nonault, in overseeing the election of the Senate's bureau when the Senate began meeting for its new term on 12 August 2008. The bureau from the previous Senate term was re-elected with only a few changes. In late August 2008, a new Senate commission, the Health, Social Affairs, Family, Gender, and Environment Commission, was created, and Mabiala was elected as its President. Mabiala was included on a Senate commission established in April 2009 to discuss with the government the issue of granting compensation to departmental councillors; although the need to compensate the councillors was agreed upon, no action had been taken to remedy the situation.

During the campaign for the 12 July 2009 presidential election, Mabiala worked on President Sassou Nguesso's re-election campaign as Head of the Department for the Prevention of Litigation and Electoral Disputes; he was also Spokesman for Legal Affairs, a post he shared with Paul Gomez Ollamba. Sassou Nguesso won the election and then appointed Mabiala to the government as Minister of Land Affairs and the Public Domain on 15 September 2009. Legally unable to hold a legislative seat while serving in the government, Mabiala vacated his Senate seat by taking his post in the government, necessitating a new election for the seat.

At the PCT's Sixth Extraordinary Congress, held in July 2011, Mabiala was elected to the PCT's 471-member Central Committee.

In the July–August 2012 parliamentary election, Mabiala was elected to the National Assembly as the PCT candidate in Makabana constituency; he won the seat in the first round with 70.17% of the vote. In the government appointed after the election, on 25 September 2012, Mabiala was retained in his post as Minister of Land Affairs and the Public Domain.

During a visit by Sassou Nguesso to Niari in March 2014, Mabiala and Justin Koumba, who were both prominent natives of Niari, urged the President to embrace a proposal to change the constitution so that he could stand for another presidential term in 2016. Soon afterward, on 6 April 2014, an organization intended to mobilize support for the proposal, the Citizen Front for Changing the Constitution, was established with Koumba as its President and Mabiala as its Vice-President. Mabiala was considered to be acting as a spokesman for Sassou Nguesso in Niari.

Following some widely reported comments by United States President Barack Obama urging African leaders to respect term limits, Mabiala retorted on 29 July 2015 that Obama ignored the "sovereign right of every people" to decide their own affairs. He also condemned opposition leaders who wanted the United States to act against Sassou Nguesso and said that they were effectively seeking a return to colonialism.

After Sassou Nguesso's victory in the March 2016 presidential election, he moved Mabiala to the post of Minister of Justice, Human Rights, and Promotion of Indigenous Peoples on 30 April 2016. He took office on 4 May, succeeding Aimé Emmanuel Yoka.

In the July 2017 parliamentary election, Mabiala stood unopposed as a candidate in Makabana, with no other candidates standing in the constituency. Following the election, he was moved back to his old post as Minister of Land Affairs, with additional responsibility for relations with Parliament, on 22 August 2017.
