= Alexandre Denguet Atiki =

Congolese politician

Alexandre Denguet Atticky (c. 1937 – 30 January 2013) was a Congolese politician. Under the single-party rule of the Congolese Labour Party (PCT), he served in the government of Congo-Brazzaville as Minister of Labour from 1971 to 1975 and was Ambassador to France in the late 1970s. From 2002 to 2012, Denguet Atiki was a Deputy in the National Assembly, and he was also President of the Parliamentary Group of the Presidential Majority from 2007 to 2012.

== Political career ==
Denguet Atticky was born at Owando in Cuvette Department. After studying in Brazzaville, he began working at the National Social Security Fund; subsequently he worked with trade unions. In the late 1960s, he was a member of the Executive Bureau of the Congolese Trade Union Confederation (Confédération Syndicale Congolaise, CSC) and was the CSC's Federal Secretary for Education; in that capacity, he was the workers' delegate representing Congo-Brazzaville at the International Labour Conference. He was also a member of the Economic and Social Council of Congo-Brazzaville. Denguet Atiki was Political Counsellor at the Congolese Embassy to France in the early 1970s, and subsequently he was appointed to the Congolese government as Minister of Labour on 16 December 1971.

Denguet Atticky's ministerial responsibilities were expanded when he was appointed as Minister of Labour and Justice in place of Aloïse Moudileno-Massengo 11 August 1972, and he was also elected to the PCT Central Committee in 1972. Denguet was retained in his post as Minister of Labour and Justice on 30 August 1973.

At a CSC congress in May 1974, Denguet Atticky warned managers that they were required to cooperate with labour unions and that they faced dismissal if they did not. However, he tempered his admonishment to management by warning that "anarchic unionists who try to systematically undermine the authority of directors" would be seriously punished.

Later, on 9 January 1975, Denguet Atticky's portfolios were again modified when he was appointed as Minister of Labour and Social Insurance, in charge of Industry. He was replaced by Pierre Ngaka in December 1975 and subsequently was Director-General of the National Office of Commerce.

Denguet Atticky's political fortunes declined following the assassination of President Marien Ngouabi in March 1977. Ngouabi's successor, Joachim Yhombi-Opango, appointed Denguet Atiki as Ambassador to France later in 1977, and Denguet Atiki presented his credentials to French President Valéry Giscard d'Estaing on 20 October 1977. While posted in Paris, he was additionally accredited as Ambassador to the United Kingdom and Permanent Delegate to UNESCO. He was dropped from the PCT Central Committee in 1979.

Denguet Atticky was Director-General and chairman of the Board of the Congolese Timber Office in the late 1980s. At the PCT's Fourth Ordinary Congress, held on 26–31 July 1989, Denguet Atiki regained a seat on the PCT Central Committee. He was also named as the PCT's Political Commissioner for Kouilou Region at that time.

=== Activities during the 2002–2007 parliamentary term ===
At the time of the March 2002 presidential election, Denguet Atticky supported President Denis Sassou Nguesso and worked as his local campaign director for the Poto-Poto district of Brazzaville. He then stood as the PCT candidate for the third constituency of Poto-Poto in the May 2002 parliamentary election, and he won the seat in the second round of voting, held in June 2002.

In the National Assembly, Denguet Atticky was designated as First Vice-president of the Health, Social Affairs, and Environment Commission on 24 August 2002. He met with his constituents in Poto-Poto in March 2003 to discuss the work of the National Assembly's first session and the establishment of a parliamentary peace committee that was intended to facilitate peace in the Pool Region. Within the ruling party, Denguet Atiki served as President of the PCT's Section 3, based in Poto-Poto.

Meeting with constituents on 11 February 2004, Denguet Atticky discussed the work of the National Assembly's seventh and eighth special sessions; in particular, he explained how government funding was being allotted in Brazzaville and he described two new laws intended to maintain and improve the condition of the country's roads. On 21 September 2004, he condemned vandalism in Poto-Poto, urging the people to be vigilant and vowing that the vandals would be punished. He also used the occasion to discuss draft laws with his constituents and stressed the government's commitment to maintaining peace.

Denguet Atticky discussed the work of the National Assembly's seventh ordinary session at a meeting with constituents on 24 February 2005. He also listened to the people's complaints and assured them that the government was working to address their problems. According to Denguet Atiki, the government was trying to improve educational infrastructure and would be assisted in doing so by a grant of 10 million CFA francs from the International Development Association; he said that some of the money would go towards improving schools in Poto-Poto. Regarding youth unemployment, Denguet Atiki noted the severity of the problem; he said that the government was trying to address it but that more needed to be done.

On 31 May 2005, Denguet Atticky met with his constituents in Poto-Poto to discuss the work of the National Assembly's eighth ordinary session; he particularly noted legislation that he believed would promote economic growth. His constituents raised concerns regarding roads, sanitation, youth unemployment, and payment of pensions. Denguet Atiki said that the government intended to address those issues and he vowed to faithfully speak on behalf of his constituents in the National Assembly.

Prior to the PCT's Fifth Extraordinary Congress, Denguet Atticky and several others were specially added to the Directory of the Preparatory Committee for the Congress on 31 October 2006. The congress was held on 22–29 December 2006. Denguet Atiki also served as the Acting President of the Parliamentary Group of the Presidential Majority in the period leading up to the 2007 parliamentary election. Justin Lekoundzou, the President of the Parliamentary Group, was ill and undergoing medical treatment abroad.

Lekoundzou and Jean-Pierre Thystère Tchicaya, the President of the National Assembly, released a letter on 24 March 2007 calling on President Sassou Nguesso to set up a truly independent electoral commission. Coming from two leading members of the Presidential Majority, the letter was a significant gesture of dissent, as it called into question the government's existing efforts to establish an independent electoral commission. In response to the letter, the deputies of the Presidential Majority, led by Denguet Atiki, held a meeting in Mpila on 11 April 2007 to clarify that they did not endorse the letter. They criticized Lekoundzou and Thystère Tchicaya for acting outside of the parliamentary process and for making a statement that could be perceived as reflecting the broader wishes of the deputies of the Presidential Majority, given their leadership roles.

=== 2007 election and subsequent events ===
Denguet Atticky stood for re-election as the PCT candidate for the third constituency of Poto-Poto in the June 2007 parliamentary election. He received the notably weak score of 17.49% in the first round of voting, placing second behind Alban Olingou Oniangui, an independent candidate who received 32.85%; the two candidates then proceeded to a second round of voting. At a rally in Brazzaville on 17 July 2007, Denguet Atiki and other PCT candidates called on party members to vote for the party's candidates in the second round; the contest was largely being fought between the PCT and its own allies, and the PCT was struggling to win more seats than it had won in the 2002 election. Denguet Atiki said on the occasion that some party members were being manipulated into opposing the PCT.

Despite his relatively poor showing in the first round, Denguet Atticky defeated Oniangui in the second round, held in August 2007; he received 57.36% of the vote. When the National Assembly began meeting for the new parliamentary term in September 2007, Denguet Atiki was chosen as President of the Parliamentary Group of the Presidential Majority.

On 29–31 May 2008, Denguet Atiki led a delegation of deputies on a visit to the Pool Region to review the construction of the Brazzaville–Gangalingolo–Kinkala–Gambari road and the status of the non-operational Djoué hydroelectric dam, as well as the progress of work on the Imboulou hydroelectric dam. He expressed approval for the progress of the road construction, while also listening to various complaints from local people—some of whom wanted the delivery of compensation for the loss of their homes due to the construction—and saying that he would inform the government about their problems. He praised the work on the Imboulou dam and said that President Sassou Nguesso was a "visionary"; according to Denguet Atiki, the progress of the dam disproved the skepticism of those who had dismissed the projects of Sassou Nguesso's development program as "dreams". He declared that the production of electricity through the dam would mark a turning point in Congo-Brazzaville's economic development.

After Sassou Nguesso announced that he would stand for re-election in the July 2009 presidential election, Denguet Atiki issued a statement in his capacity as President of the Presidential Majority Parliamentary Group in which he called on Sassou Nguesso's supporters to campaign vigorously, "highlighting the outstanding merits of our great leader", his domestic achievements, and his experience in foreign affairs. He was the deputy campaign director for the Rally of the Presidential Majority (RMP) coalition in Poto-Poto, working under the local campaign director Charlotte Opimbat. At a rally held together with Opimbat on 7 July 2009, Denguet Atiki stressed the importance of preserving peace and portrayed Sassou Nguesso as the candidate of peace, while suggesting that the opposition candidates were possible threats to national stability: "If a presidential candidate wants to fight, tell him to find a suitable place and start a war with members of his family. As for us, we do not want tribal war in our country."

As part of his constituency activities, Denguet Atiki has donated school supplies to primary schools and medicine to medical centers in Poto-Poto. He donated toys to children at five Poto-Poto preschools on 19 November 2009, while crediting the preschool teachers with playing an important part in the implementation of Sassou Nguesso's program with regard to education.

On 15 April 2011, Denguet Atiki chaired a meeting of PCT deputies that endorsed the party leadership's decision to hold the PCT's Sixth Extraordinary Congress later in the year. He called for a revitalization of the PCT to "contribute to the modernization of Congo" and stressed the importance of social justice, urging party members to ensure that the PCT remained true to its original left-wing ideals, particularly in the context of popular demands for greater democracy in different parts of the world. At the Sixth Extraordinary Congress in July 2011, Denguet Atiki was elected to the PCT's 51-member Political Bureau.

In the July–August 2012 parliamentary election, Jean-Claude Ollingo Oniangué, rather than Denguet Atticky, stood as the PCT's candidate in the third constituency of Poto-Poto, winning the seat in the first round of voting.

Denguet Atticky died in Brazzaville on 30 January 2013. He was 76 years old. He was interred at the Marien Ngouabi Mausoleum in Brazzaville.
