= LGBTQ rights in the Congo =

LGBTQ rights in the Congo could refer to:

- LGBTQ rights in the Democratic Republic of the Congo
- LGBTQ rights in the Republic of the Congo
