= Makosso =

Makosso is a Congolese surname. Notable people with the surname include:

- Anatole Collinet Makosso (born 1965), Republic of the Congo politician
- Francois Luc Makosso (1938–2020), Congolese politician
- René Makosso (born 1979), Congolese swimmer
