= Life Party =

Life Party may refer to:

- Life Party (Republic of the Congo)
- Liberal Party (Japan, 2016), formerly known as the Life Party
