= Bitsindou =

Bitsindou is a surname. Notable people with the surname include:

- David Bitsindou (born 1989), French footballer
- Gérard Bitsindou (1941–2012), Congolese politician
- Scott Bitsindou (born 1996), Congolese footballer
