= Human rights in the Republic of the Congo =

The Republic of Congo gained independence from French Equatorial Africa in 1960. It was a one-party Marxist–Leninist state from 1969 to 1991. Multi-party elections have been held since 1992, although a democratically elected government was ousted in the 1997 civil war and President Denis Sassou Nguesso has ruled for 26 of the past 36 years. The political stability and development of hydrocarbon production made the Republic of the Congo the fourth largest oil producer in the Gulf of Guinea region, providing the country with relative prosperity despite instability in some areas and unequal distribution of oil revenue nationwide.
The Congolese Human Right Observatory claims a number of unresolved and pending issues in the country.
Discrimination against Pygmies is widespread, the result of cultural biases, especially traditional relationships with the Bantu, as well as more contemporary forms of exploitation.

== General situation ==
According to The Congolese Human Right Observatory, notable issues in the country include: unsatisfactory access to water and electricity, the dispossession of indigenous and local communities by multinational corporations in complicity with local authorities, a significant number of political prisoners, repression of foreign journalists via legal proceedings and attacks by police, general limiting of political freedoms, violations of the right to a fair trial, rape and other forms of sexual assault, torture, arbitrary arrests and detentions, summary executions, ill-treatment within prisons, discrimination and marginalization of indigenous peoples in spite of specific laws protecting them, and threats against human rights defenders.

== Status of Pygmies ==
According to some reports, the relation between Pygmies and Bantus in all areas of the country is "strained, lopsided and, some say, abusive". While some claim that the bondage is a "time-honored tradition", others point at the fact that Pygmies can be paid "at the master's whim; in cigarettes, used clothing, or even nothing at all." Pygmies are negatively affected by the actions of landowners, foresters and miners, which severely impacts upon their nomadic lifestyles in the forests of northern Congo.

On 30 December 2010, the Congo parliament adopted a law for the promotion and protection of the rights of indigenous peoples. This law is the first of its kind in Africa, and its adoption is a historic development for indigenous peoples on the continent. However, a report in 2015 suggested that not much changed, with Pygmies still being persecuted as "poachers". A Bayaka woman in Congo said “the ecoguards [anti-poaching squads] make us sit here starving. They have ruined our world. If we try to hunt in the forest they beat us so badly. They even kill us if they see us in the forest.” A 2019 report by the United Nations found that despite the actions of the Congolese government, Pygmies still experienced discrimination and severe social exclusion.

== Media ==
The media is classed as non-free. It is owned or controlled by the government. There is one government-owned television station, three government-owned radio stations, and three private pro-government radio stations, and a government-owned newspaper.

== Historical situation ==
The following chart shows the ROC's ratings since 1972 in the Freedom in the World reports, published annually by Freedom House. A rating of 1 is "free"; 7, "not free".^{1}

Historical ratings
Year	Political Rights	Civil Liberties	Status	President^{2}
1972	7	7	Not Free	Marien Ngouabi
1973	5	6	Partly Free	Marien Ngouabi
1974	5	6	Partly Free	Marien Ngouabi
1975	5	6	Partly Free	Marien Ngouabi
1976	5	6	Partly Free	Marien Ngouabi
1977	7	6	Not Free	Marien Ngouabi
1978	7	7	Not Free	Joachim Yhombi-Opango
1979	7	7	Not Free	Joachim Yhombi-Opango
1980	7	6	Not Free	Denis Sassou-Nguesso
1981	7	6	Not Free	Denis Sassou-Nguesso
1982^{3}	7	6	Not Free	Denis Sassou-Nguesso
1983	7	6	Not Free	Denis Sassou-Nguesso
1984	7	6	Not Free	Denis Sassou-Nguesso
1985	7	6	Not Free	Denis Sassou-Nguesso
1986	7	6	Not Free	Denis Sassou-Nguesso
1987	7	6	Not Free	Denis Sassou-Nguesso
1988	7	6	Not Free	Denis Sassou-Nguesso
1989	7	6	Not Free	Denis Sassou-Nguesso
1990	6	6	Not Free	Denis Sassou-Nguesso
1991	6	4	Partly Free	Denis Sassou-Nguesso
1992	3	3	Partly Free	Denis Sassou-Nguesso
1993	3	3	Partly Free	Pascal Lissouba
1994	4	4	Partly Free	Pascal Lissouba
1995	4	4	Partly Free	Pascal Lissouba
1996	4	4	Partly Free	Pascal Lissouba
1997	7	5	Not Free	Pascal Lissouba
1998	7	5	Not Free	Denis Sassou Nguesso
1999	6	5	Not Free	Denis Sassou Nguesso
2000	6	4	Partly Free	Denis Sassou Nguesso
2001	5	4	Partly Free	Denis Sassou Nguesso
2002	6	4	Partly Free	Denis Sassou Nguesso
2003	5	4	Partly Free	Denis Sassou Nguesso
2004	5	4	Partly Free	Denis Sassou Nguesso
2005	5	5	Partly Free	Denis Sassou Nguesso
2006	6	5	Not Free	Denis Sassou Nguesso
2007	6	5	Not Free	Denis Sassou Nguesso
2008	6	5	Not Free	Denis Sassou Nguesso
2009	6	5	Not Free	Denis Sassou Nguesso
2010	6	5	Not Free	Denis Sassou Nguesso
2011	6	5	Not Free	Denis Sassou Nguesso
2012	6	5	Not Free	Denis Sassou Nguesso
2013	6	5	Not Free	Denis Sassou Nguesso
2014	6	5	Not Free	Denis Sassou Nguesso
2015	6	5	Not Free	Denis Sassou Nguesso
2016	7	5	Not Free	Denis Sassou Nguesso
2017	7	5	Not Free	Denis Sassou Nguesso
2018	7	5	Not Free	Denis Sassou Nguesso
2019	7	5	Not Free	Denis Sassou Nguesso
2020	7	5	Not Free	Denis Sassou Nguesso
2021	7	6	Not Free	Denis Sassou Nguesso
2022	7	6	Not Free	Denis Sassou Nguesso
2023	7	6	Not Free	Denis Sassou Nguesso

== International treaties ==
The ROC's stances on international human rights treaties are as follows:

International treaties
Treaty	Organization	Introduced	Signed	Ratified
Convention on the Prevention and Punishment of the Crime of Genocide	United Nations	1948	-	-
International Convention on the Elimination of All Forms of Racial Discrimination	United Nations	1966	-	1988
International Covenant on Economic, Social and Cultural Rights	United Nations	1966	-	1983
International Covenant on Civil and Political Rights	United Nations	1966	-	1983
First Optional Protocol to the International Covenant on Civil and Political Rights	United Nations	1966	-	1983
Convention on the Non-Applicability of Statutory Limitations to War Crimes and Crimes Against Humanity	United Nations	1968	-	-
International Convention on the Suppression and Punishment of the Crime of Apartheid	United Nations	1973	-	1983
Convention on the Elimination of All Forms of Discrimination against Women	United Nations	1979	1980	1982
Convention against Torture and Other Cruel, Inhuman or Degrading Treatment or Punishment	United Nations	1984	-	2003
Convention on the Rights of the Child	United Nations	1989	1990	1993
Second Optional Protocol to the International Covenant on Civil and Political Rights, aiming at the abolition of the death penalty	United Nations	1989	-	-
International Convention on the Protection of the Rights of All Migrant Workers and Members of Their Families	United Nations	1990	2008	-
Optional Protocol to the Convention on the Elimination of All Forms of Discrimination against Women	United Nations	1999	2008	-
Optional Protocol to the Convention on the Rights of the Child on the Involvement of Children in Armed Conflict	United Nations	2000	-	2010
Optional Protocol to the Convention on the Rights of the Child on the Sale of Children, Child Prostitution and Child Pornography	United Nations	2000	-	2009
Convention on the Rights of Persons with Disabilities	United Nations	2006	2007	-
Optional Protocol to the Convention on the Rights of Persons with Disabilities	United Nations	2006	2007	-
International Convention for the Protection of All Persons from Enforced Disappearance	United Nations	2006	2007	-
Optional Protocol to the International Covenant on Economic, Social and Cultural Rights	United Nations	2008	2009	-
Optional Protocol to the Convention on the Rights of the Child on a Communications Procedure	United Nations	2011	-	-

== See also ==
- Freedom of religion in the Republic of the Congo
- Human trafficking in the Republic of the Congo
- Internet censorship and surveillance in the Republic of the Congo
- LGBT rights in the Republic of the Congo
- Politics of the Republic of the Congo

== Notes ==
1. Note that the "Year" signifies the "Year covered". Therefore the information for the year marked 2008 is from the report published in 2009, and so on.
2. As of January 1.
3. The 1982 report covers the year 1981 and the first half of 1982, and the following 1984 report covers the second half of 1982 and the whole of 1983. In the interest of simplicity, these two aberrant "year and a half" reports have been split into three year-long reports through interpolation.
