= Tié-Tié =

- Arrondissement
- Interactive map of Tié-Tié
- Country: Republic of the Congo
- Department: Pointe-Noire

Area
  - Total: 51.248 km^{2} (19.787 sq mi)

Tié-Tié is the third arrondissement of the ciry of Pointe-Noire in the Republic of the Congo. C'est le plus vaste et le plus peuplé de la commune.

== History ==
The deputy mayors, the delegated mayors or the administrator-mayors who have succeeded one another at the head of this district are: François Kandhot, Justin Mvembe, Jean-Pierre Mafouana, Zéphyrin Mafouana Makosso, Norbert Saya, Antoine Lomba, Edouard Mouketo, Jean-Félix Missamou, Auguste Ngoulou, Albert Moussounda Moufama, Julienne Malanda, Pierre Albert Victor Bayonne, André Guy Edmond Loemba, Ambroise Bayakissa, and Jean Romuald Tchicamboud.

== Toponymy ==
Part of the land in Tié-Tié still bears the name Ndaka-Susu.

In the Fond Tié-Tié district is the old station of the railway line Congo-Ocean Railway (CFCO), which is presently abandoned. It was the first link between the central station of Pointe-Noire and the city.
