= Mayor of Pointe-Noire =

The following is a list of mayors of the city of Pointe-Noire, Republic of the Congo.

== Under colonial administration ==
- Jean Jacoulet (1939-1941)
- Capa Gary (1941-1945)
- Jouvenaux (1945)
- Charles Marmiesse (1945-1947)
- Henry Pouvergne (1947)
- Blanc (1947-1948)
- Dacosta (1948-1950)
- Pertihon (1950-1953)
- Henri Olive (1953-1955)
- Joffre (1955-1956)

== Under congolese administration ==
- Robert Stéphane Tchitchelle (1956-1963)
- Marcel Babindamana (1963-1965)
- Gustave Ondziel (1965-1969)
- Fayette-Tchitembo (1969-1970)
- Prosper Matoumpa-Mpolo (1970-1971)
- Docteur Jacques Bouiti (1971-1973)
- Jean-Pierre Mafouana (1973-1979)
- Zéphirin Mafouana-Makosso (1979)
- Fulgence Milandou (1979-1984)
- Jean-Baptiste Missamou (1984-1990)
- Jean-Pierre Detchissambou (1990-1991)
- Marcel Tchionvo (1991-1992)
- Étienne Boukaka (1992-1993)
- Jean Théodore Pouaboud (1993-1994)
- Jean-Pierre Thystère-Tchicaya (1994-1997)
- François Luc Macosso (1997-2002)
- Jean Christian Akonzo (2002-2003)
- Roland Bouiti-Viaudo (2003-2017)
- Jean-François Kando.since 28 August 2017

== See also ==
- Pointe-Noire
- Timeline of Pointe-Noire
