= Léon Angor =

Congolese diplomat (1928–1993)

Léon Robert Angor (13 July 1928 – 1993) was a Congolese politician and trade union leader. He was a leader of the CASL trade union centre. He was the President of the National Assembly of the Republic of the Congo between 1964 and 1966. Angor was identified as part of the pro-China wing of the ruling National Movement of the Revolution. Under Angor's aegis, the Congolese Trade Union Confederation was formed in March 1964.

In May of 1966, Angor ran for re-election for the presidency of the National Assembly, but was defeated. It was speculated that this election marked a defeat of the pro-China wing and a victory of the pro-Soviet tendency in the party.

Between August and December 1968, Angor was a member of the National Council of the Revolution (the ruling military junta). He later served as ambassador to the United Arab Republic and Gabon.

Angor was born in Brazzaville on 13 July 1928. He died in 1993.
