= Pierre-Damien Boussoukou-Boumba =

Congolese politician

Pierre-Damien Boussoukou-Boumba (born 1945) is a Congolese politician. During the single-party rule of the Congolese Labour Party (PCT), he served in the government of Congo-Brazzaville as Minister of Health from 1979 to 1984, as Minister of Scientific Research from 1984 to 1989, and as Minister of Basic Education from 1989 to 1991. He was Ambassador to the United States in the 1990s and Minister of Small and Medium-Sized Enterprises from 1997 to 2002; subsequently he was a Deputy in the National Assembly of Congo-Brazzaville from 2002 to 2007. Boussoukou-Boumba was also President of the Union for the Defence of Democracy (UDD), a political party, from 1996 to 2011.

== Political career ==
Boussoukou-Boumba, a member of the Bakongo ethnic group, was born in Kibangou, part of Niari Region and located in the south of Congo-Brazzaville. Under President Denis Sassou Nguesso, he was Minister of Health and Social Affairs from 1979 to 1984 and Minister of Scientific Research from 1984 to 1989. He was then appointed as Minister of Basic Education and Literacy on 13 August 1989 and served in that position until 1991. He also joined the Central Committee of the Congolese Labour Party (PCT) in 1989. Boussoukou-Boumba was subsequently appointed as Ambassador to the United States on 12 October 1993 and presented his credentials on 9 December 1993, serving in that post until April 1996.

In 1996, Boussoukou-Boumba became President of the UDD. After Sassou Nguesso returned to power in October 1997, he appointed Boussoukou-Boumba to the government as Minister of Small and Medium-Sized Enterprises and the Craft Industry on 2 November 1997; later, in the government named on 12 January 1999, Boussoukou-Boumba's portfolio was expanded and he was appointed as Minister of Trade, Supplies, Small and Medium Enterprises, and the Craft Industry. In the May–June 2002 parliamentary election, he was elected to the National Assembly as the UDD candidate in Kibangou constituency, winning the seat in a second round of voting. Following the election, he was not retained in the government and was succeeded in his ministry on 21 August 2002. In the National Assembly, he was elected as President of the Legal and Administrative Affairs Commission on 24 August 2002.

Boussoukou-Boumba was again the UDD candidate in Kibangou constituency in the June–August 2007 parliamentary election, facing 15 challengers for the seat. He was initially defeated by an independent candidate, Serge Victor Ignoumba, but on 26 October 2007 the Constitutional Court annulled the election in Kibangou (along with three other constituencies). When the second round of the vote was held over again on 26 December 2007 (it was the last seat to be decided), Boussoukou-Boumba was again defeated by Ignoumba; he received 42.76% of the vote against 57.24% for Ignoumba.

In the August 2008 Senate election, Boussoukou-Boumba stood as a candidate of the Rally of the Presidential Majority (RMP) coalition in Niari Region, but failed to win a seat. There were six available seats in Niari, and he placed eighth, receiving 47 votes from the 130 electors.

Boussoukou-Boumba headed the African Union's observer mission for the January 2011 Central African general election. After the election was held, he gave a positive assessment, describing the vote as "free, democratic, and inclusive". He acknowledged some flaws but said that they were "not likely to jeopardize the credibility of the electoral process".

On 25 June 2011, the UDD merged itself into the PCT in response to the latter party's opening to other parties, a gesture which the PCT made in advance of its Sixth Extraordinary Congress in July 2011. According to Boussoukou-Boumba, a long-time ally of Sassou Nguesso, the decision was intended to assist Sassou Nguesso by bolstering his party; Boussoukou-Boumba also spoke of the need to help in developing and revitalizing the PCT, and he urged UDD members to "remain faithful to our new political party". At the Sixth Extraordinary Congress, held a month later, Boussoukou-Boumba was elected to the PCT's 471-member Central Committee.

Boussoukou-Boumba stood again as a candidate in Kibangou in the July–August 2012 parliamentary election, but was defeated. Standing as a PCT candidate, Boussoukou-Boumba was elected as a local councillor in Kibangou in the September 2014 local elections. In October 2014, he was elected to the Senate as a PCT candidate in Niari, receiving the votes of 60 of the 131 electors.
