= Franklin Boukaka =

Congolese musician

- Born: Franklin Boukaka; 10 October 1940; Brazzaville, French Congo (modern-day Republic of the Congo)
- Origin: Congolese
- Died: 23 February 1972 (aged 31) Brazzaville, Republic of the Congo
- Genres: Congolese rumba; soukous
- Occupations: Baritone; singer; guitarist; songwriter
- Instruments: Guitar vocals
- Years active: 1955–1970s

Franklin Boukaka (October 10, 1940 - about February 23–24, 1972) was a Congolese baritone singer, guitarist, and songwriter who is recognized as a pioneer of Congolese popular music. He performed in bands based in each of "the two Congos," i.e., the countries now named the Republic of the Congo and the Democratic Republic of the Congo; toured worldwide; achieved broad popularity; took outspoken political stances; and is widely believed to have been the victim of an extrajudicial execution during an attempted coup in the Republic of the Congo.

== Early life ==
Franklin Boukaka was born François Boukaka on October 10, 1940, in Brazzaville (the capital of present-day Congo-Brazzavile). His parents were both musicians; his father, Aubin Boukaka, was with the musical ensemble “La Gaieté,” while his mother, Yvonne Ntsatouabaka, was a singer and hostess of funeral vigils and popular celebrations. He was the oldest of eight children, five boys and three girls, and he attended schools in Brazzaville.

== Musical career ==
=== Early groups (Sexy Jazz, Sympathic Jazz, Negro Band, African Jazz/Jazz African, Vox Africa), 1955-62 ===
After finishing school Boukaka joined a series of bands, moving between each of the two capital cities across the Congo River from one another: Brazzaville, and Leopoldville (later Kinshasa), capital of what was then the Belgian Congo and after independence became the Republic of the Congo, then Zaire, and now the Democratic Republic of the Congo.

This progression of bands started in 1955, when at age 14 or 15 he joined the group Sexy Jazz, founded by Miguel Samba, Siscala Mouanga, and Aubert Nganga. In 1957, when Miguel Samba and Siscala Mouanga departed to join a group called Cercul Jazz, Boukaka joined the group Sympathic Jazz, of Alphonse Marie Toukas, and toured Kabinda and Leopoldville.

In November 1958, with a number of other musicians mostly from Brazzaville, including his friend Michel Boyibanda who had been in Sympathic Jazz with him, Boukaka founded Negro Band. According to some sources, Negro Band was founded and always based in Brazzaville, while according to others it was based in Leopoldville during Boukaka's tenure with it, and in 1960 moved across the river to Brazzaville. In either event, Boukaka was certainly working in Leopoldville in 1960, when he joined musicians from African Jazz, including Tabu Ley Rochereau, to perform as "Jazz African" while the band's leader Joseph Kabasele (Le Grand Kallé) was in Brussels for the Round Table Conference on the Belgian Congo's independence. Subsequently, still in Leopoldville, with Jeannot Bombenga and Casino Mutshipule from African Jazz, he founded the band Vox Africa; other members of its first lineup included Papa Noël and Djeskain Massengo.

=== Cercul Jazz, 1962-67 ===
In 1962, his place of employment returned from Leopoldville to Brazzaville where he joined the band Cercul Jazz, which two colleagues from Sexy Jazz had joined five years earlier. Cercul Jazz was founded in 1954 and named after a youth organization with which it was affiliated, Cercule Culturel de Bacongo. Boukaka became a leader of the group, and developed a substantial following. Cercul Jazz under Boukaka developed a distinctive style that, while considered ahead of its time, remained faithful to the style of the ensemble of Congo ("restée fidèle au style de l’orchestre de Bacongo"); its music was described as one of the most beautiful in rumba ("l’un des plus beaux de la Rumba").

In addition to touring their own country, in 1963-64, Cercul Jazz embarked on an African tour, playing in Gabon, Chad, Cameroon and Nigeria. In 1965-66, they spent eight months in Cameroon.

At the same time, Boukaka expanded his songwriting topics beyond "love and nature" to include social issues and politics, or "to analyze and criticize the human soul." His politics were socialist, and he particularly emphasized anti-colonialism and African unity. At the same time, he was willing to criticize post-independence African governments for corruption and nepotism.

In 1967, (Note: 1965 according to the catalog of the Bibliothèque nationale de France (the French national library) at https://data.bnf.fr/fr/14046320/cercul_jazz/, but multiple other sources say 1967.) Cercul Jazz recorded his composition "Pont sur le Congo" (Bridge on the Congo), suggesting that, with colonialism finished, the two Congos ought to unite. Its lyrics included (translated):

Accept this day my prayer
For a united Congo.
If we accept the teachings of Lumumba
Kinshasa and Brazza will get on well together.
Brothers and sisters of the two banks,
Let's join hands and forge the glory
Of our Congo. (Note: Original (Lingala): Boyamba lelo losako na ngai Po na unité oy’a Congo Tolanda mibeko’oh mia Lubamba Pe Kisasa na Brazza To yokana Bakonzi bosala lokumu Ya Congo na biso Source: 8 September 2017 posting on the MBOKAMOSIKA site, "Publié par D'après "Les coulisses de la musique congolaise", de Faugus: Traduction de « Pont sur le Congo » de Franklin Boukaka, d’après « Les coulisses de la musique congolaise », de Faugus Izeidi" at http://www.mbokamosika.com/2017/09/pont-sur-le-congo.html)

"Pont Sur le Congo" became one of Cercul Jazz's best-known songs, but its recommendation was unwelcome to, and went unheeded by, the leaders of the two nations, which had opposing geopolitical alignments, with each leader seeking to undermine the other.

=== As a solo artist and group leader, international performances and recordings, 1967-71 ===
Later in 1967, Boukaka left Cercul Jazz to begin performing and recording under his own name. He organized an ensemble of sanza (thumb piano) players as part of a Congolese folklore troupe that traveled to Paris under French governmental auspices. Boukaka would sing and play guitar, accompanied by two or three sanza players. In Paris Boukaka recorded for French musician Gilles Sala's production company, accompanied by two sanza players and Congolese saxophonist Jean Serge Essous of Les Bantous de la Capital, several songs including "Les Brazzavilloises," about the women of Brazzaville. These recordings were re-issued in the 1980s as the album Survivance.

Subsequently, with his sanza troupe in Brazzaville, Boukaka introduced a new song, "Les Immortels," in which he sings of an old man telling him (translated) "young man, every man must die one day, but not all deaths have the same meaning," (Note: Original (French): "Mon petit, tout homme doit mourir un jour; mais toutes les morts n’ont pas les mêmes significations." Source: afrolegends.com, see footnotes.) and the refrain names sixteen martyrs killed for their beliefs, including Patrice Lumumba, Che Guevara, Malcolm X, Simon Kimbangu, Albert Luthuli, and Andre Matswa. This song has been called prophetic, given that Boukaka was apparently killed for his own convictions a few years later. It may also be seen as an implicit criticism of the political leadership of the two Congos at that time, for failing to live up to the heroic standards of their predecessors.

In 1969, Boukaka performed with his sanza troupe at the Pan-African Cultural Festival in Algiers. His performance of "Les Immortels" was considered a highlight of that major event.

In 1970, Boukaka recorded several songs in Paris, arranged and accompanied on saxophone and piano by Manu Dibango. These sessions have been described as the "artistic zenith" of Boukaka's career. Under the direction of the Cameroonian maestro and with different instrumentation including violins and piano rather than guitars, the music from these sessions radically differed in style from the Congolese popular music, Congolese rumba or soukous, that Boukaka had previously made. The twelve-song album from these sessions, packaged after his death as Franklin Boukaka à Paris, has been called "a work of such power and beauty that it cannot go unremarked." Remarkable tracks on the à Paris album include different, stripped-down arrangements of "Pont sur la Congo" and "Les Immortels," as well as a new rumba called "Likambo Oyo" (this problem). But Boukaka's song that achieved the greatest success, and the one for which he is most remembered and listened to fifty years later, is "Le Bucheron" (the woodcutter; the Kenyan version of the single was titled "Le Bucheron (Africa)"), a complaint about the state of Africa and its poor, the refrain lamenting (translated) "Oh, Africa, where is your independence? ... where is your liberty?" (Note: Original (Lingala): "Eh e Africa, O Lipanda ... O Liberté." Source: June 22, 2018 post on African Nostalgia at https://africannostalgia.blogspot.com/2018/06/franklin-boukaka-le-bucheron-lyrics.html)

In 1970, he toured Guinea, backed by a leading local band, Keletigui Traoré's Keletigui et ses Tambourinis. They performed together at the 1970 version of the Quinzaine Artistique et Culturelle Nationale, the annual Guinean national festival. The Guinean record label Syliphone released three records of him with that band. In one, captioned "Unité Africaine," a live performance most likely from the national festival, Boukaka called for "Africa united and strong" in his Congolese language, Lingala; named African states and leaders in a call-and-response; and then spoke to the crowd in Susu, a language of Guinea that he had learned for the occasion.

In 1971, he served as a "animateur culturel" at UNESCO in Paris, and was praised by its Director-General.

Boukaka also performed internationally in Spain, Germany, the USSR, China, Yugoslavia, Mongolia, and North Korea, according to Guy Menga and Clement Ossinonde.

== Family life ==
Boukaka was married to Antoinette Mouanga, who died after they separated. Two of his popular songs were inspired by her: "Luzolo" and one known as "Antoinette Mouanga" or "Mwanga." "Mwanga," which remains popular and has been covered by several other artists, includes lyrics translated as "Mwanga, no one escapes death, we know it, but the pain caused by your death makes me wonder why you left so soon. Your friends and the whole city of Brazzaville mourn you. Where did Mwanga go? If death had a price, I, Boukaka, I would pay it to spare you." (Note: Original (Lingala) lyrics not available, song here: https://www.youtube.com/watch?v=fxCbbLFtCLY .)

His one child, Malcom Boukaka, was named after Malcolm X.

== Death ==
On February 22, 1972, a group attempted a coup against the People's Republic of the Congo's avowedly Marxist-Leninist government led by Marien Ngouabi, who had taken power himself in a 1968 coup, and was later assassinated in a 1977 coup. Boukaka was involved, and afterward was among the two or three (Note: Three according to the 2000 Stewart book, at p.185. Two according to the article by 2015 article by "Mfumu," who names them: "Certains sont arrêtés, d’autres réussissent à s’enfuir tandis que deux infortunés sont assassinés, Élie Théophile Itsihou, ancien ministre et Franklin Boukaka, artiste congolais de renommée internationale." (translation: Some are arrested, others manage to escape, while two unfortunate people are murdered, Élie Théophile Itsihou, a former minister and Franklin Boukaka, an internationally renowned Congolese artist.)) persons listed as deceased in the failed coup. The circumstances of his death were never explained. Congolese-music historian Gary Stewart reports that "many Congolese suspect he was executed - all the more so because his name had originally turned up on a list of those who had been arrested." Given the lack of information, his exact date of death is unknown; some sources state it as probably February 22, while others say he was killed on the night of 23–24 February.

== Evaluations and remembrance ==
Boukaka has been lauded for his "exceptional musical talent," and specifically "his appealing stage presence, mellow baritone, and increasingly incisive compositions." Gilles Sala, who recorded him in Paris in 1967, said "I liked Franklin Boukaka's voice enormously. He had a beautiful timbre, a very pleasing voice. And then as a composer . . . just like Joseph Kabasele, like Nico, like Franco, they had a very developed sense of popular music."

Boukaka was a key early figure in the development of Congolese popular music, a pioneer of the rumba and soukous that dominated Africa from the 1970s to the 1990s. He was also, metaphorically, a "Pont sur le Congo", working in each of the two politically opposed countries whose capital cities were across that river from each other, and a major participant, in both directions, in the cultural cross-pollenization of that time between Brazzaville and Kinshasa.

Following his death, his music was banned on the radio in Brazzaville. But nearly fifty years later, Boukaka continues to be remembered. More recordings of his music have been issued after his death than while he was alive. Recent newspaper columns, blog posts and other essays from, for example, India, the Netherlands, the United States, and Kenya recall his life and highlight his music, particularly the "timeless" song "Le Bucheron." While at least one Western expert on Congolese music disdains it," perhaps because it is played so much, the song has been the subject of numerous covers and remakes, for example, by John Kazadi of Zimbabwe in 1985, the Nairobi City Ensemble in 2005, Manu Dibango, Aïcha Koné (fr), and Bisso Na Bisso with Passi. That this list includes artists from Southern, East, West, and Central Africa, and both Anglophone and Francophone countries, indicates that musicians have heeded Boukaka's Pan-African message, even if politicians have not.

In 1975, Cameroonian singer Dicky Ndoumbé issued a single titled "Regrette Franklin Boukaka." In 2016, the French publisher La Doxa Éditions published in his memory Franklin, l’insoumis: d'après une idée de Marien Fauney Ngombé (Franklin, the rebellious: based on an idea by Marien Fauney Ngombé). It is a book of fourteen short stories by fourteen authors including Ndèye Fatou Kane, each inspired by a song by Boukaka. In 2019, when a physical bridge over the Congo River was planned, that would connect the long-separated twin capital cities of Brazzaville and Kinshasa, a journalist described it as the delayed fruition of Boukaka's 1967 song "Pont sur le Congo." In Brazzaville, a commemoration of what would have been his 80th birthday was planned for October 10, 2020.

Boukaka's political engagement and opposition to authority have been compared to those of Bob Marley and Fela Kuti. He is referred to as a martyr, and his death at the young age of 32 lamented.

== Discography ==
=== Singles and EPs ===
- Franklin Boukaka, "Ba Yemba Ba Congo" / "Yambi Na Bana Poto" / "Les Brazzavilloises" / "Pasi Na Komona" (Riviera Afrique, 231.305) 1969
- Franklin Boukaka avec Keletigui et ses Tambourinis, "Munu Ngiedi" / "Kitoko Mingi" (Editions Syliphone Conakry, SYL 251) 1970
- Franklin Boukaka avec Keletigui et ses Tambourinis, "M’Bongi Eyi" / "Tata aleleti" (Editions Syliphone Conakry, SYL 252) 1970 [recorded live at the Palais de la Peuple, Guinea]
- Franklin Boukaka avec Keletigui et ses Tambourinis, "Unité Africaine" / "Kitoko Mingi" (Editions Syliphone Conakry, SYL 253) 1971
- Franklin Boukaka, "Le Bucheron" / "Nakoki" (Sonafric, SAF 1518) 1972
- Franklin Boukaka, arrangements et direction orchestre Manu Dibango, "Dia Bikolo" / "Luzolo" (Sonafric, SAF 1528) 1972
- Franklin Boukaka, "Etumba" / "Les Immortels" (Sonafric, SAF 1506) unknown
- Franklin Boukaka, direction orchestre Manu Dibango, "Le Bucheron" / "Likambo Oyo" (Sonafric, SAF 1578) unknown
- Franklin Boukaka, "M'Bongi" / "Ya M'Bamba" (Sonafric, SAF 1711) unknown

=== Albums ===
Numerous recordings of Boukaka's 1955-67 performances with groups including Negro Band, Vox Africa, Cercul Jazz, and possibly others have been issued under the names of those groups, and are not included here. Some of those have been collected on albums issued under his name:

- Franklin Boukaka (EMI Pathe C 064-15992) 1978

[album sometimes known as "Bibi," as the title of its first track. All 11 tracks were originally released by Cercul Jazz on Pathe: track 1 on the Congo? Bolingo! compilation (Pathé CPTX 240.807), tracks 2-5 on Super Cercul Nº 1 (Stenco EG 783), tracks 6-7 on Cercul Interafricain, and tracks 8-11 on Super Cercul Nº 2 (Stenco Pathé EG 799).]

- Franklin Boukaka, Les Merveilles du Passé 1967 (African 360.153) 1986

[compilation of 1960s singles, side 1 with two tracks by Cercul Jazz, and two tracks by Negro Band. Side 2 contains four tracks by Orchestre Negro-Succes, of Bavon Marie-Marie. No source indicates any connection between Boukaka and that group; so, despite the album's name and cover, Boukaka is apparently not on Side 2.]

1967 Paris recording session with Gilles Sala:

- Franklin Boukaka ses Sanzas et Son Orchestre Congolais, Survivance (Gilles Sala GS 8403) 1983

[described as reissue of a 1967 release; 6 tracks, the four on Riviera Afrique 231.305 (above), "Kue Tu Kuenda," and "Couple Ya Bolingo"]

- Franklin Boukaka ses Sanzas et Son Orchestre Congolais, Survivance (Bolibana Collection) (Bolibana Productions BIP 333) 2010?

[same as GS 8403 plus an additional, seventh track, "Rendez-vous à Bamako"]

1970 Paris recording session with Manu Dibango:

- Franklin Boukaka, arrangements et direction orchestre Manu Dibango (Sonafric SAF 50 001) 1970 or 1974

[sometimes known as "Le Bucheron," as the title of its first track]

- Franklin Boukaka à Paris, arrangements et direction orchestre Manu Dibango (Sonafric SAF 50 048) 1977

[reissue of SAF 50 001 with the addition of two tracks, "Etumba" and "Les Immortels," for a total of 12 tracks instead of 10, and a change of one song title from "Nakoki" to the erroneous "Nakoko".]

- Franklin Boukaka à Paris, arrangements Manu Dibango (Sonafric – CD 50048) 1999

[CD reissue of SAF 50 048]

=== Included on compilations ===
- 1er Festival Culturel Africain, Alger 1969, Culture et Arts Congo-Brazzaville (LPL 4779, 4780) 19??

[Eleven tracks by various artists, with two - the first and last - by Franklin Boukaka et les Sanzas: "Les Immortels" and "Mpassi Zi Sakidi"]

- Afrique Varietes (Riviera Afrique – 521.186 T) 1972

[Sixteen tracks by various artists, including five by Franklin Boukaka Ses Sanzas Et Son Orchestre Congolais: the four on Riviera Afrique 231.305, and "Kue Tu Kuenda"]

- Keletigui et ses Tambourinis: The Syliphone Years (Sterns STCD3031-32) 2009

[Includes "M'bongi Eyi" by Franklin Boukaka avec Keletigui et ses Tambourinis]
