= Youth in Movement =

Political party in the Republic of the Congo

Youth in Movement (Jeunesse en Mouvement) is a political party in the Republic of the Congo. In the parliamentary election held on June 24 and August 5, 2007, the party won 1 out of 137 seats.
