= List of presidents of the National Assembly of the Republic of the Congo =

The president of the National Assembly of the Republic of the Congo is the presiding officer of the lower chamber of the legislature of Republic of the Congo.

Name	Period	Party	Notes
Christian Jayle	1958 – 1959		
Alphonse Massemba-Débat	July 1, 1959 – 1961		
Marcel Ibalico	August 9, 1961 – 1963		
Léon Robert Angor	December 12, 1963 – 1966		
André Georges Mouyabi	January 10, 1966 – 1968		
In abeyance	1968 – 1973		
Dieudonné Miakassissa	June 24, 1973 – 1974		
Alphonse Mouissou-Poaty	December 12, 1974 – 1977		
Jean Ganga Zansou	June 1979 – 1989		
Bernard Combo Matsiona	1989 – 1991		
Monseigneur Ernest Kombo	June 1991 – 1992		
André Mouélé	24 September 1992 – 17 November 1992	PCT	
André Nsatouabantou Milongo	June 26, 1993 – 1997	UDR-Mwinda	
Justin Koumba (President of the National Transitional Council)	January 14, 1998 – 2002		
Jean-Pierre Thystère Tchicaya	August 10, 2002 – 2007	RDPS	
Justin Koumba	4 September 2007 – 19 August 2017	PCT	
Isidore Mvouba	19 August 2017 - present	PCT	
