= Martin Parfait Aimé Coussoud-Mavoungou =

Congolese politician and businessman (1959–2022)

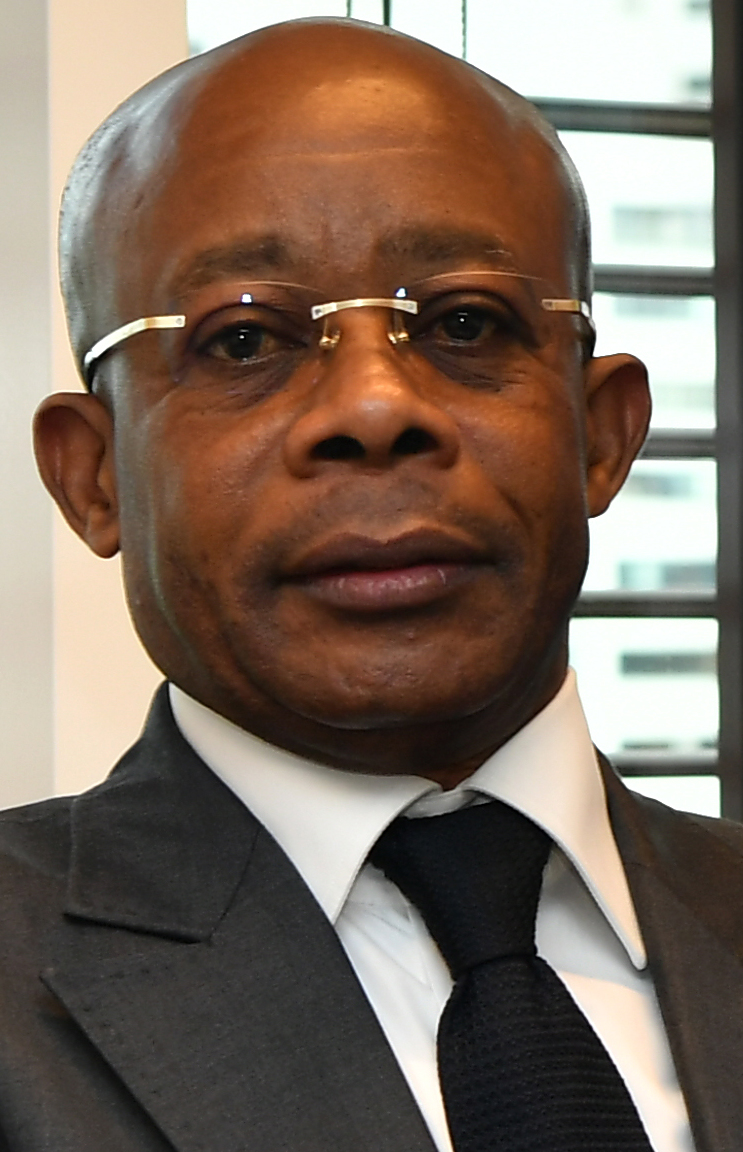
- Coussoud-Mavoungou in 2019
- Born: 12 November 1959; Dolisie, French Congo, French Equatorial Africa, France
- Died: 14 March 2022 (aged 62); Paris, France
- Education: University of Nantes; Marien Ngouabi University; University of Bordeaux 1
- Occupations: Politician; Businessman

Martin Parfait Aimé Coussoud-Mavoungou (12 November 1959 – 14 March 2022) was a Congolese politician and businessman.

== Biography ==
Coussoud-Mavoungou attended primary school in the Kouilou Department before attending a Catholic seminary in Loango. After his baccalauréat, he earned a degree in private law at Marien Ngouabi University in 1980. He then obtained a master's degree in business law from the University of Bordeaux 1 in 1982 and a certificate in maritime and aerospace law from the University of Nantes in 1983. In 1985, he earned a diploma in maritime affairs from the University of Bordeaux, the sixth person from the Republic of the Congo to earn such a degree.

Coussoud-Mavoungou was active in the fields of radiocommunications, maritime meteorology, maritime search and rescue, marine pollution projects, and the Congolese maritime legislative and regulatory systems. In February 1988, he participated in a seminar in Kingston, Jamaica on maritime law.

From 1999 to 2002, Coussoud-Mavoungou was an advisor on maritime and river transport to the Ministry of Transport and Communications. At the same time, he was also administrator of the autonomous port of Pointe-Noire. In addition, he was a substitute member of the National Assembly from 1993 to 1997 and again from 2002 to 2005. He gained the trust of President Denis Sassou Nguesso and held the position of Minister Delegate for the Ministry of State and the Ministry of Transport and Communications. In January 2021, he was appointed permanent secretary on the Interministerial Committee on State Action at Sea and Continental Water.

Coussoud-Mavoungou died following liver surgery in Paris on 14 March 2022, at the age of 62.

== Publications ==
- Pour un système concerté de contrôle des navires en UDEAC (1994)
- Contribution pour une relance et relance et revalorisation de la pêche maritime industrielle au Congo (1994)
- Anatomie d’une hérésie en mer (2002)
- Contribution à la connaissance de l’exploitation des droits de trafic maritimes (2002)
- Le Congo adhère aux conventions maritimes (courrier des transports) (2002)
- Le Congo et le Code ISPS (2004)
- Le Contrôle des marines par l’État du port : Expérience et Contributions Congolaise (2004)
