= Firmin Ayessa =

Congolese politician (1951–2026)

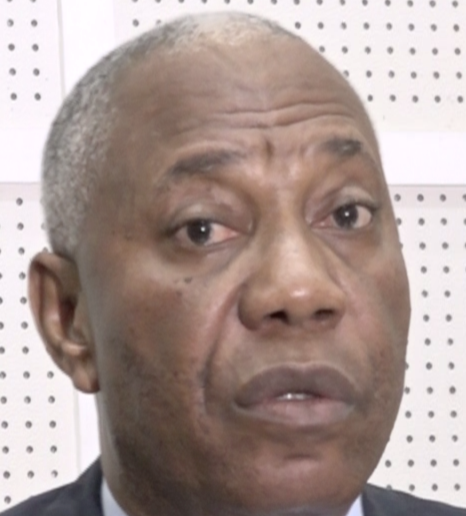
Ayessa in 2018

Firmin Ayessa (2 November 1951 – 17 February 2026) was a Congolese politician who served in the government of Congo-Brazzaville as Deputy Prime Minister for Civil Service, State Reform, Labour, and Social Security from 2017. As a long-time associate of President Denis Sassou Nguesso, Ayessa held a series of key posts at the Presidency of Congo-Brazzaville; he was Director of the Civil Cabinet of the President from 1999 to 2002, deputy director of the Presidential Cabinet from 2002 to 2007, and he was Director of the Presidential Cabinet from 2007 to 2017.

== Life and career ==
Ayessa, an ethnic Mbochi, was born in Ondza, located near Makoua in the north of Congo-Brazzaville. A journalist by profession, he studied in France; after returning to Congo-Brazzaville, he worked on radio and television beginning in 1977. He then served as an adviser at the Congolese embassy in Paris from 1980 to 1983, and he was appointed Director of the Cabinet of the Minister of Communication in 1984. Later, he was Director-General of Audiovisuals. In 1990, he joined the Congolese Labour Party (PCT); he was also elected to the PCT Central Committee in 1990.

He served as Director of the Congolese Information Agency (ACI) in the early 1990s. He was also editor-in-chief of Aujourd'hui ("Today"), a daily newspaper that described itself as "private and independent of political parties", when it launched on 23 March 1991. The paper launched immediately prior to the opening of the 1991 National Conference, in which the PCT lost power. Later in 1991, Théodore Kiamossi, who had resigned from the PCT, was appointed to replace Ayessa as Director of the ACI; Ayessa was then appointed Communications Adviser to President Denis Sassou Nguesso. He remained in the latter post until 1992, when Sassou Nguesso was defeated in a multiparty presidential election and left office.

In March 1997, he was elected to the Higher Council for the Freedom of Communication. Sassou Nguesso regained power at the end of the June–October 1997 civil war, and he then appointed Ayessa to the government as Minister for the Organization of the National Forum and Relations with the National Transitional Council, on 2 November 1997. Ayessa was subsequently appointed Director of the Civil Cabinet of the President, with the rank of Minister-Delegate, on 18 January 1999. He was deputy director of Sassou Nguesso's campaign for the March 2002 presidential election, working under Isidore Mvouba, the campaign director.

In the May 2002 parliamentary election, Ayessa was elected to the National Assembly as the PCT candidate in Makoua constituency, located in Cuvette Region; he received 70.80% of the vote and won the seat in the first round. He was then moved from his post as Director of the Civil Cabinet to the post of deputy director of the Cabinet of the President, Head of the Department of Communication, and Spokesman of the President on 19 August 2002. Having held a succession of high-level posts under Sassou Nguesso, Ayessa was considered an influential adviser to the President.

Ayessa spent nearly five years as deputy director of the President's Cabinet, working under Aimé Emmanuel Yoka. After Yoka was moved to the post of Minister of Justice, President Sassou Nguesso appointed Ayessa to succeed Yoka as Director of the President's Cabinet, with the rank of Minister of State, on 15 May 2007. He officially succeeded Yoka at a ceremony on 22 May 2007. Ayessa also stood again as the PCT candidate in Makoua in the June 2007 parliamentary election; he won the seat in the first round with 99.59% of the vote.

In early June 2009, Ayessa was designated as Sassou Nguesso's National Campaign Director for the July 2009 presidential election. Sassou Nguesso easily won the election amidst an opposition boycott.

He presided over the ceremony at which the Ninja militia leader Pasteur Ntoumi, who had earlier led a rebellion against the government, was installed in his office as Delegate-General for the Promotion of the Values of Peace and Repair of the Ravages of War in December 2009. At the ceremony, Ayessa expressed a spirit of reconciliation, congratulating Ntoumi and welcoming the opportunity to work with him.

At the PCT's Sixth Extraordinary Congress, held in July 2011, Ayessa was elected to the PCT's 51-member Political Bureau. In the July–August 2012 parliamentary election, Ayessa again stood as the PCT candidate in Makoua. He won the seat in the first round with 72.75% of the vote.

Acting as Sassou Nguesso's personal representative, Ayessa headed Congo-Brazzaville's delegation to the swearing in of Catherine Samba-Panza as transitional President of the Central African Republic on 23 January 2014. He praised Samba-Panza and reaffirmed Congo-Brazzaville's commitment to efforts to stabilize and improve the situation in the Central African Republic, which was plagued by violence and disorder.

Ayessa was national director of Sassou Nguesso's campaign for the March 2016 presidential election. In the July 2017 parliamentary election, Ayessa stood unopposed as a candidate in Makoua, with no other candidates standing in the constituency. After 10 years as Director of the Cabinet of the President, he was instead appointed to the government as Deputy Prime Minister for the Civil Service, State Reform, Labour and Social Security on 22 August 2017.

Ayessa died in Istanbul on 17 February 2026, at the age of 74.
