= François Luc Macosso =

Congolese politician (1938–2020)

Minister of Justice
- In office 3 April 1965 – 20 September 1968
- Preceded by: Pascal Okiemba-Morlende
- Succeeded by: Aloyse Moudileno-Massengo

Director of the Security Police
- In office 21 September 1968 – 7 June 1970

Ambassador of the Republic of Congo to the European Economic Community, Benelux, and Scandinavia
- In office 8 July 1970 – 25 February 1983

Dean of Marien Ngouabi University
- In office 26 February 1983 – 11 November 1997

Mayor of Pointe-Noire
- In office 11 November 1997 – 30 July 2002
- Preceded by: Jean-Pierre Thystère Tchicaya
- Succeeded by: Roland Bouiti-Viaudo

Personal details
- Born: 18 October 1938 Madingo-Kayes, French Congo
- Died: 8 April 2020 (aged 81) Pointe-Noire, Republic of the Congo
- Occupation: Politician

François Luc Macosso (18 October 1938 – 8 April 2020) was a Congolese politician.

== Biography ==
Macosso was born in Madingo-Kayes. He and his family were part of the Yema clan. After he studied banking, he became director of the Ponténégrine branch of the Banque Nationale de Développement du Congo. After the fall of Fulbert Youlou in 1963, Macosso was elected to the National Assembly.

In April 1965, Macosso was appointed as the Minister of Justice by Pascal Lissouba and Alphonse Massamba-Débat. In September 1968, he was appointed Director of the Security Police. On 8 July 1970, he was appointed Ambassador to the Benelux and Scandinavian countries, as well as the European Economic Community. He held this position for thirteen years. After this, he became Dean of Marien Ngouabi University.

Following the Congolese Civil War, Macosso was elected Mayor of Pointe-Noire, replacing Jean-Pierre Thystère-Tchicaya, who had been appointed to the National Transitional Council.

During his time leading Pointe-Noire, hundreds of thousands of people fled to the city to get away from the Civil War. The population increased from 500,000 to 1,000,000 in just two years. One of the main scourges combatted by Mayor Macosso was the commercial exploitation of children for sex. He created the party Movement of Citizens of the City of Pointe-Noire, which later merged with Jean-Baptiste Tati Loutard's Movement Action Renewal, close in ideology to the Congolese Party of Labor. Macosso was succeeded in Pointe-Noire by Roland Bouiti-Viaudo.

From 2013 to 2016, Macosso worked in the cabinet of the President. He was considered a strong cultural activist, particularly with the Legacy and Memories Foundation.

François Luc Macosso died on 8 April 2020 at the age of 81 in Pointe-Noire.

== Awards ==
- Knight of the Congolese Order of Merit
