= Justin Koumba =

Congolese politician

President of the National Assembly of Congo
- In office 14 January 1998 – 2002
- Preceded by: André Milongo
- Succeeded by: Jean-Pierre Thystère Tchicaya
- In office 4 September 2007 – 19 August 2017
- Preceded by: Jean-Pierre Thystère Tchicaya
- Succeeded by: Isidore Mvouba

Justin Koumba (born 5 April 1947) is a Congolese politician who was President of the National Assembly of Congo-Brazzaville from 2007 to 2017. He was an official at the United Nations and served in the government of Congo-Brazzaville as Minister of National Education in 1992; subsequently, he was President of the National Transitional Council from 1998 to 2002 and President of the National Human Rights Commission from 2003 to 2007.

== Political career ==
Koumba was born at Gango in Kibangou District, located in Niari Department. He worked as an official at the United Nations beginning in 1976. During the 1991–1992 transition to multiparty elections, Koumba was appointed to the transitional government headed by Prime Minister André Milongo as Minister of National Education on 26 January 1992. He was retained as Minister of National Education in a cabinet reshuffle on 21 May 1992, and was additionally given responsibility for science, technology, youth, sports, culture, and the arts. The transitional period ended later in 1992; Koumba then returned to the UN and became UNESCO's representative for Central Africa and the Great Lakes countries.

Following President Denis Sassou Nguesso's return to power in the June–October 1997 civil war, a National Reconciliation Forum was held in January 1998; at the conclusion of the forum, Koumba was elected as President of the National Transitional Council (CNT), a 75-member body that was to act as the provisional parliament, on 14 January 1998. Although Koumba was a southerner, the CNT was mostly composed of northerners, in line with the political dominance of northerners under Sassou Nguesso. The body, in place from 1998 to 2002, was critically characterized as an "embarrassingly compliant rubber stamp".

Speaking on Radio France Internationale in May 2000, Koumba alleged that former Prime Minister Bernard Kolelas, a political enemy of Sassou Nguesso who was living in exile, was a murderer. He also claimed that Kolelas had prisons built at his home and asserted that he had proof of these crimes. Kolelas denied Koumba's accusations.

Koumba was the President of the Alliance for Congo (l'Alliance pour le Congo, APC), which was established in 2001 and supported Sassou Nguesso. Prior to this, he was never a member of any political party. After the CNT, headed by Koumba, had been in place for more than four years, a parliamentary election was held in May–June 2002 in order to replace it with an elected National Assembly. Koumba stood in the election as the APC candidate for Banda constituency in Niari, and he won the seat in the first round with 58.70% of the vote. He did not attend the first meeting of the National Assembly, at which Jean-Pierre Thystère Tchicaya was elected as President of the National Assembly, on 10 August 2002.

A year later, on 13 August 2003, he was one of 45 members of the National Human Rights Commission appointed by Sassou Nguesso, and on 2 September 2003, he was elected by the Commission as its President.

On 26 May 2007, the APC announced its merger with Sassou Nguesso's Congolese Labour Party (PCT). After resigning from his post as President of the National Human Rights Commission, Koumba stood in the June–August 2007 parliamentary election as the PCT candidate in Banda constituency and was re-elected to the National Assembly. After receiving 36.70% of the vote in the first round, Koumba faced Action Movement for Renewal candidate Jean-Claude Moussavou in the second round; he defeated Moussavou and won the seat. At the opening session of the National Assembly's new parliamentary term on 4 September 2007, Koumba was elected as the President of the National Assembly. He was the only candidate and received 121 votes from the 129 deputies participating in the vote. Koumba's election was in accordance with a custom that the post should be held by a southerner, and he was viewed as more reliably loyal to President Sassou Nguesso than the previous head of the legislature, Thystère Tchicaya.

As Congo-Brazzaville marked its 50th year of independence in 2010, Koumba said at the opening of the National Assembly's ninth ordinary session in mid-2010 that "after half a century of political sovereignty, we must now achieve economic sovereignty." In October 2010, Koumba visited Iran and met with Iranian President Mahmoud Ahmadinejad, saying that he hoped for greater cooperation between the two countries. He also visited the mausoleum of Ayatollah Ruhollah Khomeini and praised Khomeini for his leadership of the 1979 Iranian Revolution.

=== Activities since 2012 ===
In the July–August 2012 parliamentary election, Koumba was re-elected to the National Assembly as the PCT candidate in Banda constituency; he won the seat in the first round, receiving 62.71% of the vote. When the National Assembly began meeting for its new parliamentary term, the deputies re-elected Koumba as President of the National Assembly on 5 September 2012. He was the only candidate for the post, receiving 135 votes from the 138 deputies who voted.

Alexandre-Ferdinand Nguendet, President of the National Transitional Council of the Central African Republic, met with Koumba on 5 June 2013 to receive Koumba's advice on managing the work of a transitional parliament, given that Koumba had headed Congo-Brazzaville's own transitional parliament from 1998 to 2002. On 2 December 2013, Koumba met with Claude Bartolone, the President of the National Assembly of France, in Paris. They discussed parliamentary cooperation as well as the unstable and violent situation in the Central African Republic. Central African Prime Minister André Nzapayéké met with Koumba in Brazzaville on 14 February 2014 to discuss the situation in his country and to express gratitude to the Congolese people for the role played by Congo-Brazzaville in the crisis.

During a visit by Sassou Nguesso to Niari in March 2014, Koumba, together with Pierre Mabiala, urged the President to embrace a proposal to change the constitution so that he could stand for another presidential term in 2016. Soon afterward, on 6 April 2014, an organization intended to mobilize support for the proposal, the Citizen Front for Changing the Constitution, was established with Koumba as its President. Koumba said that the new organization's goal was to mobilize popular support for the proposal to get the government to act on it. Contrary to the widespread perception that Sassou Nguesso was ultimately behind the initiative, Koumba stressed that they were not acting according to Sassou Nguesso's instructions.

In late April 2014, Koumba called on deputies to reflect on state institutions and suggested that those institutions might no longer be ideally suited to the country's situation. He said that he was "confident that we will, in sincerity and harmony, find solutions compatible with the requirements of the evolution of our society". Koumba opened an African regional meeting of the Parliamentary Assembly of the Francophonie that was held in Brazzaville on 26–28 May 2014. He said on the occasion that "the role of parliamentarians is crucial to governance in Africa, because we have the power to legislate. The people who elected us based their hopes on our capacity for involvement and adaptation in different situations."

In the July 2017 parliamentary election, he was re-elected to the National Assembly as the PCT candidate in Banda, winning the seat in the first round with 99% of the vote. When the National Assembly began meeting for the new parliamentary term on 19 August 2017, Isidore Mvouba was elected to succeed Koumba as President of the National Assembly.
