= Washington State Nurses Association =

U.S. professional organization

WSNA
- Washington State Nurses Association
- Founded: 1908
- Headquarters: Seattle, Washington, United States
- Location: United States
- Members: 18,000+
- Key people: David Keepnews, PhD, JD, RN, FAAN, Executive Director
- Parent organization: American Nurses Association; American Federation of Teachers
- Affiliations: Washington State Labor Council, AFL–CIO
- Website: www.wsna.org

Founded in 1908, the Washington State Nurses Association (WSNA) is the professional organization representing more than 20,000 registered nurses in the U.S. state of Washington. WSNA is a constituent organization of the American Nurses Association (ANA) and is affiliated with ANA, AFT Healthcare and the AFL–CIO.

David Keepnews is the Executive Director of the Association. The WSNA's first strike (and the longest nurses strike in U.S. history to that point) began in September 1976.

== Primary mission ==
The Washington State Nurses Association provides leadership for the nursing profession and promotes quality health care for consumers through education, advocacy and influencing health care policy in the state of Washington.

== Publications ==
- The Washington Nurse

== Washington State Nurses Foundation ==
This foundation was established in 1982 to provide awards, grants, and scholarships to support the advancement of nursing in Washington state.

== WSNA Political Action Committee (PAC) ==
The WSNA-PAC is the nonpartisan political action committee of the WSNA. Established in 1972, WSNA-PAC was one of the first state Nurses-PACs in the country. The PAC's activities include educating and assisting nurses for political action, identifying and supporting nurse candidates for elected state office, raising funds, and interviewing and endorsing candidates for state office who are supportive of nursing issues.

== See also ==
- Labor unions in the United States
- Labour movement
- List of nursing organizations

== Archives ==
- Washington State Nurses Association Records. 1911–1980. 77.45 cubic feet.
- King County Nurses Association Records. 1908–1990. 35.39 cubic feet.
