= Ndèye Fatou Kane =

Senegalese novelist (born 1986)

Ndèye Fatou Kane (born 23 November 1986 in Dakar) is a Senegalese novelist and feminist.

== Biography ==
She is the granddaughter of Senegalese writer Cheikh Hamidou Kane. She studied transport and international logistics.

In 2014, she released her first novel, Le Malheur de vivre, prefaced by her grandfather. It is a narrative of a Senegalese's life between France and Senegal, between urban lifestyle and Pulaar culture, and a tragic love story.

In 2016, she participated in a short story collection titled Franklin l'insoumis and dedicated to musician Franklin Boukaka. It is made of fourteen short stories written by fourteen different authors. In 2018, Kane released her essay Vous avez dit féministe ? ("You said 'feminist'?") in which she analysed the feminist movements across Africa. She also writes on social networks about African women, inspired by her fellow citizens Awa Thiam and Mariama Bâ. In 2018, she was awarded the Under-35 Youth Prize of the Francophone countries.
