= Ange Diawara =

Congolese politician and military leader (1941–1973)

Vice President of the Council of National Revolution
- In office Sept 1968 – Jan 1969
- President: Marien Ngouabi
- Preceded by: Jacques Opangault
- Succeeded by: Himself as First Vice President

First Vice President
- In office Jan 1969 – March 1969
- Preceded by: Himself
- Succeeded by: Alfred Raoul

Personal details
- Born: 1941 Sibiti, French Congo
- Died: April 1973 (aged 31–32) People's Republic of the Congo
- Cause of death: Execution
- Party: Congolese Party of Labour
- Spouse: Adélaïde Mougany
- Profession: Politician, Militar

Ange Diawara (1941 – April 1973) was a Congolese politician and military leader. He orchestrated the 1972 coup attempt and subsequently led the M 22 rebel movement until his capture and execution.

The son of a chief, Diawara was born in Sibiti to a Congolese mother and a Congolese father with Malian origins. He received higher education in Cuba and the Soviet Union. When the National Revolutionary Council (CNR) was established in August 1968, Diawara became the First Vice-president of the CNR Executive Board in charge of Defense and Security; he was subsequently a founding member of the Congolese Party of Labour (PCT) in December 1969 and became Secretary of the CNR Executive Board in charge of Defense and Security. He was included on the PCT Political Bureau, formed on December 31, 1969, as First Political Commissar to the Army, and was a government minister. He was the Minister of Equipment, Agriculture, Water Affairs, and Forestry, and on June 13, 1971, he was additionally assigned the Development portfolio. When the PCT Political Bureau was reduced to five members in December 1971, Diawara remained a member of the Bureau and was placed in charge of the Permanent Commission of the Army.

Diawara was a prominent figurehead of the left wing of the PCT which decried the leadership's "tribalization, embourgeoisement and bureaucratization". He has been described as a "Maoist-Guevarist". By 1970, he managed to acquire the support of the Mobutu regime in Zaire to foment an insurrection in Goma Tsé-Tsé. Along with other leftist members of the PCT's Bureau, such as Claude-Ernest Ndalla and Jean-Baptiste Ikoko, he orchestrated a failed coup d'état against President Ngouabi on 22 February 1972. After more than a year of evading capture, Diawara was captured in Kinshasa and secretly extradited by the Zairese authorities in April 1973. He was tortured and executed along with other conspirators shortly afterwards. The bodies of Diawara and Ikoko were publicly exhibited in the Stade de la Révolution.

Diawara was married to Adélaïde Mougany.
