= Ministry of Justice (Republic of the Congo) =

The Ministry of Justice of the Republic of the Congo (Congo Brazzaville) manages the court system and is composed of the following:

- The cabinet
- The departments attached to the firm
- The general inspection of the courts and services related to the judicial body
- The General Secretariat for Justice
- The general directorates

== List of ministers (Mainly post-1960 upon achieving independence) ==
- Pascal Okiemba-Morlende (1963-1964)
- François Luc Macosso (1965-1968)
- Aloyse Moudileno-Massengo (1968–1972)
- Alexandre Denguet (1972–1975)
- Antoine Kaine (1975)
- Pierre Ngaka (1976–1977)
- Alphonse Mouissou-Poaty (1977–1978)
- Andre Mouelle (1979)
- Victor Tamba-Tamba (1979–1980)
- Dieudonne Kimbembe (1981–1989)
- Alphonse Nzoungou (1989–1991)
- Jean Martin M'Bemba (1992)
- Jean Francois Tchibinda Kouangou (1993–1995)
- Joseph Ouabari (1995–1997)
- Pierre Nze (1997–1999)
- Jean Martin M'Bemba (1999–2007)
- Aimé Emmanuel Yoka (2007–2016) [referred to as the Minister of State, Minister of Justice, Minister of Justice and Human Rights]
- Pierre Mabiala (2016–present)

== See also ==
- Justice ministry
- Garde des Sceaux, ministre de la Justice (république du Congo) [Minister of Justice, Minister of Justice (Republic of the Congo)]
- Republic of the Congo
