= March 24 strike =

Strike in the republic of Congo

On March 24, 1976, the Congolese Trade Union Confederation (CSC) organized a major strike. The strike was called in the back-drop of a helicopter accident in which the president, Marien Ngouabi, was injured. The CSC demanded the rehabilitation of the Central Committee of the Congolese Party of Labour.

The strike was violently repressed by the regime. Several key personalities, such as Pascal Lissouba (former Prime Minister), Pierre Nzé (former second-in-command in the party hierarchy), Anatole Kondo (general secretary of CSC) and Jean-Jules Okabando (leader of the Congolese Socialist Youth Union), were arrested. However, there had been no clear linkages between Lissouba and the other three arrested personalities. Once Ngouabi reassumed power from the interim leader, Jean-Pierre Thystère-Tchicaya, the four were sent for re-education in the villages and spared from imprisonment.
