= Prostitution in Mali =

Prostitution in Mali is legal, but third party activities such as procuring are illegal. Prostitution is common in Malian cities. UNAIDS estimate there to be 35,900 prostitutes in the country. Prostitution is on the rise, many having turned to prostitution because of poverty.

In the capital, Bamako, many prostitutes are from Nigeria and other West African countries. In July and August there is an influx of students from various areas of West Africa who work as prostitutes during the summer vacation. There are also many Chinese bars in the country where prostitution occurs. It is estimated that the Chinese sex workers send 2 billion Cfa back to China annually. Many Nigerian prostitutes work in the area around the Morila Gold Mine.

In early 2012, rebel and Islamic extremist groups occupied northern Mali prompting the United Nations Multidimensional Integrated Stabilization Mission in Mali (MINUSMA) to be sent to the country. The influx of military personnel caused a rise in the demand for prostitution. In the Gao Region, prostitutes from Burkina Faso, Niger, Côte d'Ivoire and Cameroon came to the area to service the needs of the UN personnel.

The cities of Bamako, Kayes, Ségou, Mopti, Timbuktu, Gao and Sikasso have a problem with teenage prostitution and sex tourism.

== Sex trafficking ==
Mali is a source, transit, and destination country for women and children subjected to sex trafficking. Internal trafficking is more prevalent than transnational trafficking; women and girls from other West African countries, particularly Nigeria, are exploited in prostitution and sex trafficking throughout Mali. Nigerian authorities estimate more than 5,000 Nigerian girls are victims of sex trafficking in Mali. Some members of Mali's black Tuareg community are subjected to slavery practices rooted in traditional relationships of hereditary servitude and reports indicate it is worsening. Other Africans transiting Mali to Europe, primarily via Algeria and Libya and less so via Mauritania, are vulnerable to trafficking. Nigerian traffickers fraudulently recruit Nigerian women and girls with promises of taking them to Europe but exploit them in sex trafficking in Mali. Malian women and girls are victims of sex trafficking in Gabon, Libya, Lebanon, and Tunisia.

The United Nations Multidimensional Integrated Stabilization Mission in Mali (MINUSMA) investigated 23 cases of conflict-related sexual violence, including forced prostitution and sexual slavery, in Gao, Timbuktu, Kidal, and a refugee camp in Mauritania in 2016. MINUSMA investigated four members of GATIA, three members of the Mali Defense and Security Forces (MDSF), and civilians in these cases, although it did not report any prosecutions or convictions for trafficking offenses.

Law 2012-023 Relating to the Combat against Trafficking in Persons and Similar Practices criminalizes all forms of trafficking of adults and children. The law prescribes penalties of five to 10 years imprisonment, and a maximum of 20 year imprisonment for cases involving aggravating circumstances.

The United States Department of State Office to Monitor and Combat Trafficking in Persons ranks Mali as a 'Tier 2 Watchlist' country.
