= Prostitution in Togo =

Prostitution in Togo is legal and commonplace. Related activities such as solicitation, living off the earnings of prostitution or procuring are prohibited. Punishment is up to 10 years imprisonment if minors or violence is involved.

Sex trafficking, child prostitution and HIV are problems in the country. However, the country has recently introduced some government codes, and has also started enforcing existing codes, such as a child code protecting the rights of children throughout the country, in order to help combat some of these problems.

== Overview ==
In 2014, it was estimated there were 10,284 sex workers in the country. A 2011 survey found 51% worked in bars and 26% in brothels. About half of the country's sex workers are in Lomé. According to research published in 2015, between 2005 and 2015, prostitution in the country increased 180%, and that three quarters of the prostitutes are Togolese, and Ghanaian women 15%. It is not uncommon for prostitutes travel between Togo and neighbouring countries to find work.

There are reports of brothels and prostitutes working in various parts of Lomé, including Décor and Kodjoviakopé (near Aflao across the Ghanaian border). The nationalities of the prostitutes include Togolese as well as Nigerians, Liberians, Ghanaians and Ivorian nationals. Many sex workers in the city have regular taxi drivers who run them around and wait while the woman is with a client. Hotel managers may also offer special rates if the sex worker brings clients there regularly.

In 2017 it was reported that a number of university students were turning to prostitution for financial reasons.

== History ==
=== German colonial period ===
During the late 19th and early 20th centuries the country formed part of the protectorate of Togoland in the German Empire. Prostitution grew with German colonisation, initially along the coast (especially in Lomé) and then spreading inland as colonisation advanced into the interior. In Lomé, Aného and Atakpamé, African prostitutes serving only European males were required to live in designated areas known as kasernierung. A brothel was built in Lomé in 1909 to replace the kasernierung area. Initially it housed 40 prostitutes.

=== French colonial period ===
Following the defeat of Germany in World War I and subsequent French control of the country, prostitution continued to flourish. The large number of single, or married men away from home, colonists and troops created the demand for prostitution. As in other French colonies, military brothels (Bordel militaire de campagne) were set up around where troops were stationed.

== Gender inequality ==
Experts convened by the United Nations found that typically "all the responsibility" of the problems that are faced in the sex industry are usually placed on women. In response to the issues noted by this committee, the government of Togo has declared that July 31 is Women's Day throughout the country. Additionally, this may have been what encouraged them to enact on some of their new policies, such as actively enforcing laws that protect children against the sex trade. This committee noted that sex was a two-person act and that the men who are typically the demand market for sex workers need to be examined too and held accountable for their actions.

== Sexual health ==
HIV and syphilis are problems in the country. Sex workers and their clients are high risk groups, especially as condom use is inconsistent, although there are 11 different prevention programmes distributing condoms throughout the country.

HIV prevalence has dropped amongst sex workers: 29.5% in 2005, 13.1% in 2011 and 11.7% in 2015. (National adult HIV prevalence was 2.1% in 2016.) However, prevalence rates vary across the country; although the average amongst sex workers was 13.1% in 2011, it ranged from 19.5% in Lomé to 7.8% in the Savanes and Kara Regions.

A study in 2008 noted that as many as 60% of long truck drivers in Togo that were having sexual relations with sex workers were not using a condom during sex. Additionally, around 50% of the truck drivers interviewed stated that they had not been tested for HIV, which is a concerning statistic considering the prevalence of sexually transmitted diseases in Togo.

A study in 2011 found 2.2% of sex workers were infected with syphilis, and 2.3% of clients. This also varied by region with those in Lomé having the highest rate of infection at 3.1%.

Homosexual men, women, and couples do not receive the same access to the ability to be diagnosed and treated for a potential case of HIV/AIDS that heterosexual couples receive.

== Human rights concerns ==
In the 2000s concerns were raised internationally about child prostitution in Togo. Togolese law explicitly prohibits the sexual exploitation of children and child prostitution, although it is not effectively enforced. NGO organizations such as UNICEF have intervened to try to get child prostitutes off the streets. There are also reports of women being trafficked for prostitution.

Another issue in Togo is that the laws do not protect well against child trafficking, and these children are usually sold in to the sex industry. Togo does not enforce the law that prevents selling children into sex slavery, and there is also no statutory rape law in Togo. Since 2007 the Togolese government has done a better job of raising awareness for people in Togo about the issues of child sexual exploitation and child prostitution. They released a code in 2007 which protected the rights of children in certain areas of life, and this code led to the eventual release of hundreds of child sex workers throughout the country of Togo, after they improved their efforts to enforce this code. Once these children were rounded up, they were properly taken care of, and tested for a variety of medical issues, mostly of mostly sexual health aspects.

== Sex trafficking ==
Togo is a source, transit and, to a lesser extent, destination country for women, and children subjected to sex trafficking. The western border of the Plateau region, which provides easy access to major roads leading to Lome, and Accra, Ghana, was a primary source for trafficking victims during the reporting period. Most Togolese victims are children exploited within the country. Traffickers bring children from rural areas to Lome, where they are exploited in child sex trafficking. Girls from Ghana are exploited in sex trafficking in Togo. From September to April, many Togolese adults and children migrate in search of economic opportunities to Benin, Burkina Faso, Niger, and Mali, where many are subjected to sex trafficking. Togolese women have been fraudulently recruited for employment in Saudi Arabia, Lebanon, the United States, and Europe, where they are subjected to forced prostitution.

The United States Department of State Office to Monitor and Combat Trafficking in Persons ranks Togo as a "Tier 2 Watch List" country.

In 2005, in a raid in the capital city Lome, over 200 people were arrested in an operation designed to reduce child prostitution. The government had previously announced on the radio its commitment to address the issue. The government's minister for child protection, Agneley Christine Mensah, said that the children who had been arrested would be taken into care and helped "to acquire new trades and skills so that they can be integrated into normal social and economic life".
