= 1976 Seattle nurses strike =

Labor dispute in Washington, United States

The 1976 Seattle nurses strike was a labor dispute between registered nurses represented by the Washington State Nurses Association and Seattle, Washington-area hospitals. More than 1,500 nurses went on strike for more than two months at 15 hospitals. Lasting 65 days, it was the longest nurses strike in U.S. history to that point. The strike was intersected with the feminist movement as many of the younger, university-educated nurses and largely female nurses rejected being yelled at by doctors and other issues of workplace harassment on top of other concerns about wages, staffing and the closed shop.
