= Kibangou District =

Coordinates: 3°26′S 12°07′E

Kibangou
- District
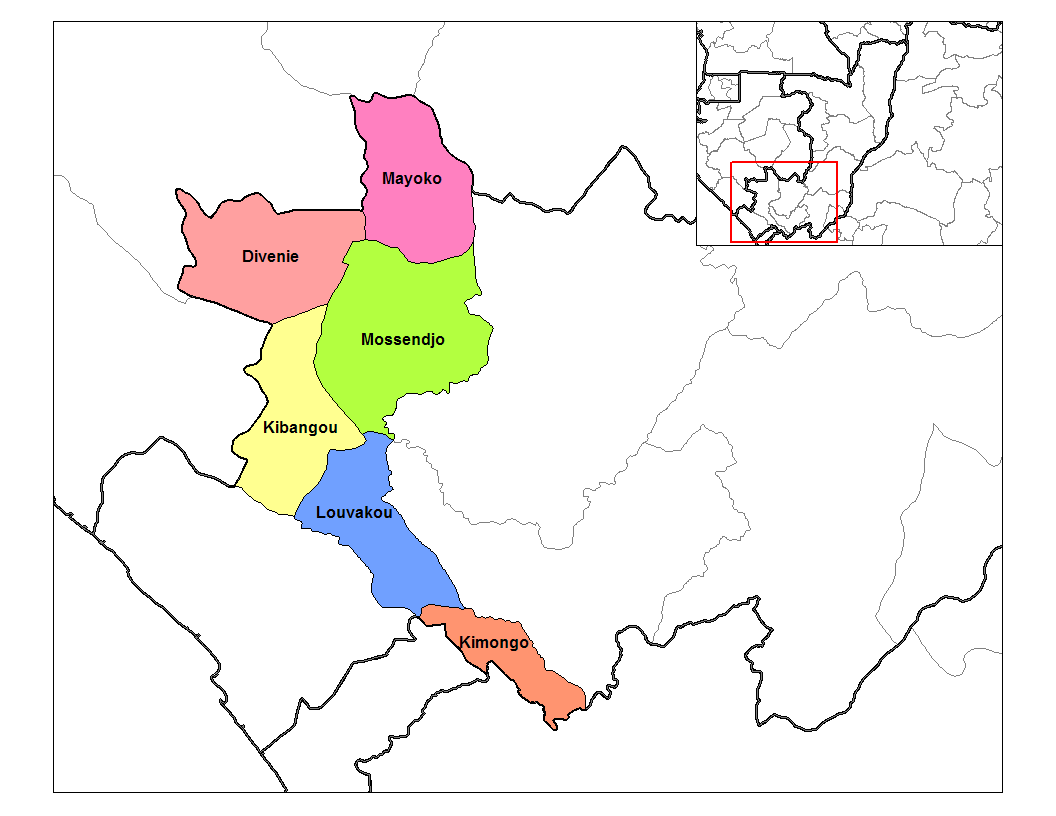
- Kibangou District in the region
- Country: Republic of the Congo
- Region: Niari Region

Area
  - Total: 1,453 sq mi (3,762 km^{2})

Population (2023 census)
  - Total: 13,430
  - Density: 9.246/sq mi (3.570/km^{2})
- Time zone: UTC+1 (GMT +1)

Kibangou (can also be written as Kibangu) is a district in the Niari Region of south-western Republic of the Congo. The capital lies at Kibangou.
