= LGBTQ rights in the Republic of the Congo =

- Republic of the Congo
- Legal status: Legal since 1940, unequal age of consent
- Gender identity: Unknown
- Military: Yes
- Discrimination protections: Limited protection based on sexual orientation.

Family rights
- Recognition of relationships: No
- Adoption: No

Lesbian, gay, bisexual, transgender, and queer (LGBTQ) people in the Republic of the Congo face legal challenges not experienced by non-LGBTQ residents. Homosexuality is legal in the Republic of the Congo, but same-sex couples and households headed by same-sex couples are not eligible for the same legal protections as opposite-sex couples, with reports of discrimination and abuse towards LGBTQ people.

== Laws regarding same-sex relationships ==
Same-sex relationships have been legal in the Republic of the Congo since 1940. The text of the 1940 Penal Code, as amended in 2006, only prohibits same-sex sexual behaviour with a person younger than 21 years. There is an unequal age of consent, with it being 18 for opposite-sex sexual activity. Same-sex marriage is explicitly banned under Section 2, Article 127 of The Republic of Congo Family Code. The code explicitly defines marriage as a public act establishing a lasting union between a man and a woman.

=== Enforcement ===
The unequal age of consent is not used for arrests. Instead, police have used the Penal Code to solicit bribes from young men they perceive as gay. Police have also lied and said same-sex sexual activity is generally illegal in order to solicit bribes. These abuses are rarely reported due to fear of police interaction with the country's LGBTQ community; however, these abuses are investigated when reported.

== Recognition of LGBTQ+ people and families ==
There is no legal recognition of same-sex unions. A married couple must be together for at least five years to adopt a child jointly. Since there is no same-sex marriage, gay and lesbian people are limited to adopting as a single person. There is no legally recognized way to change one's gender identity.

== Discrimination protections ==
There is no broad legal protection against discrimination based on sexual orientation or gender identity. There are no laws against hate crimes nor against discrimination in education, healthcare, housing, or employment. There are no laws against conversion therapy or surgeries on intersex children intended to make their bodies fit expected norms. There are no regulations against men who have men donating blood, though those who do so are likely to face discrimination. There are no laws regarding the exclusion or inclusion of gay people serving in the military.

Some limited protections based on sexual orientation regarding personal data are in place. Article 19 of Law No. 27-2020 on the Fight against Cybercrime states that, without a legal exception or expressed consent, no one can place or store personally data which directly or indirectly reveals "the person's ethnic origin, political, philosophical, or religious opinions, or trade union membership, or relating to the person's health or sexual orientation." Nonconsentually storing data on one's sexual orientation or any of the other aforementioned characteristics is punishable by one to five years in prison, a fine of one million to ten million CFA francs, or both.

Articles 8, 10 and 15 of Decree No. 2025-66 relating to the Personal data of Air Passengers protects sexual orientation. Law No. 29-2019 on the Protection of Personal Data protects a person's sexual life as sensitive and personal data in Articles 4, 14 and 40.

== Living conditions ==
The U.S. Department of State's 2010 Human Rights Report found that was no significant gay or lesbian community presence due to social stigma. Despite the existence of such stigma, no cases of violence or discrimination were reported to non-governmental organizations or news media. Instances of discrimination may have been unreported.

In 2022, violence towards LGBTQ+ people rose due to forced confinement during the COVID-19 pandemic. Increasing economic hardship further contributed to the increase in violence that year. Most violence was committed by family members. State authorities and regular citizens have committed violence against LGBTQ+ people in 2022 and 2023. Reported violence against LGBTQ people is punished by law enforcement. In a survey conducted from 2021 to 2023, 73 percent of Congolese people in Brazzaville said they would dislike or strongly dislike having a homosexual neighbor.

In 2023, Outright International identified the presence of LGBTQ civil societies in the Republic of the Congo, but they have been unable to gain legal recognition. In 2020, a non-governmental organization was denied legal registration until references to the organization's focus on the LGBTQ+ community were removed.

== Summary table ==
Same-sex sexual activity legal	Yes (Since 1940)
Equal age of consent	No (Since 1947)
Anti-discrimination laws in hate speech and violence	No
Anti-discrimination laws in employment	No
Anti-discrimination laws in the provision of goods and services	No
Same-sex marriage	No
Recognition of same-sex couples	No
Step-child adoption by same-sex couples	No
Joint adoption by same-sex couples	No
Gays and lesbians allowed to serve openly in the military	Yes
Right to change legal gender	No
Conversion therapy made illegal	No
Access to IVF for lesbians	No
Commercial surrogacy for gay male couples	No
MSMs allowed to donate blood	Yes

== See also ==
- Human rights in the Republic of the Congo
- LGBT rights in Africa
