= Kibangou =

- Location in the Republic of the Congo
- Coordinates: 3°28′56″S 12°19′4″E
- Country: Republic of the Congo
- Department: Niari
- District: Kibangou

Kibangou (also Kibangu) is a town in the Niari Department of the Republic of the Congo. Located on National Road 3, its population was 2,127 at the 2007 census and 6,426 in 2015.
