= Prostitution in Senegal =

Prostitution in Senegal is legal and regulated. Senegal has the distinction of being one of the few countries in Africa to legalize prostitution, and the only one to legally regulate it. The only condition that it is done discreetly. Prostitution was first legalised in 1966. UNAIDS estimate that there are over 20,000 prostitutes in the country. The average age for a sex worker in Senegal is 28 years old and female.

There are reports of police and security forces extorting money in return for overlooking infringements of prostitution regulations. Sex workers report that they are targeted by police for bribes or free sex whether they are registered or not.

Senegal has gained a reputation as a sex tourism destination since the 1970s and since the early 2000s it has also gained a reputation for female sex tourism.

== Legal situation ==
It has been legal since 1969 to sell sex as long as prostitute has registered, is over 21 years old, has a regular medical check-up, and can present an up-to-date carnet sanitaire (medical report card) to the police upon request. Estimates of the number of prostitutes who are registered vary from 8 to 25%.

Solicitation is prohibited by article 318 of the Penal Code, and 3rd party involvement, such as procuring and brothel keeping, is prohibited by articles 323 - 325.

Illegal foreign prostitutes are subject to arrest, as are pimps and underage prostitutes. Underage prostitution typically makes use of adult pimps. The maximum sentence for procuring a minor for prostitution is five years' imprisonment and a fine of 4 million CFA francs (approximately US$7,600), but the law is not generally enforced effectively.

== Health concerns ==
The regulation of prostitution was enacted in 1969 to try to control the spread of STIs through regular medical check-ups and treatment. Police monitor the sex workers to ensure they attend regular health checks. Although the law requires two examinations per months, clinics cannot cope and this has been reduced to once a month. Any sex worker who tests positive for an infection has their carnet sanitaire suspended until treated.

In 1993 the Senegalese sex worker organisation Association for Women at risk from AIDS (AWA) was formed out of an AIDS prevention scheme at Dakar polytechnic. AWA provide support and advice to sex workers, including at the clinics, and distribute condoms.

UNAIDS reported 6.6% HIV prevalence and 9.7% syphilis infections amongst sex workers in 2016.

== Sex trafficking ==
Senegal is a source, transit, and destination country for women and children subjected to sex trafficking. Senegalese boys and girls are also subjected to sex trafficking. Internal trafficking is more prevalent than transnational trafficking. Reports indicate most Senegalese sex trafficking victims are exploited within Senegal, particularly in the southeastern gold-mining region of Kédougou. West African women and girls are subjected to sex trafficking in Senegal, including for child sex tourism for sex tourists from France, Belgium, and Germany, among other countries.

There are reports that the entry of foreign prostitutes into the country being professionally organized. In 2016, judges convicted four sex traffickers under the pimping statute, acquitted one alleged sex trafficker, and convicted a fifth trafficker for an unknown type of exploitation. Sentences upon conviction ranged from two to three years imprisonment and fines.

The United States Department of State Office to Monitor and Combat Trafficking in Persons ranks Senegal as a "Tier 2 Watch List" country.
