= Life Party (Republic of the Congo) =

Political party in the Republic of the Congo

The Life Party (French: Parti la Vie) is a political party in the Republic of the Congo. In the parliamentary election held on 24 June and 5 August 2007, the party won 1 out of 137 seats.
