= Bernard Combo-Matsiona =

Congolese politician, engineer and minister (1939–2012)

- Bernard Combo-Matsiona, Minister of Health and Social Affairs (1986–1989)

Minister of Labor, Civil Service and Social Welfare
- In office 1981–1987

Minister of Health and Social Affairs
- In office 1987–1989

President of the National Assembly
- In office 1989–1991
- Preceded by: Jean Ganga Zansou
- Succeeded by: Ernest Kombo

Senator, Pool Department
- In office 2009–2012

Personal details
- Born: 17 December 1939 Brazzaville, French Equatorial Africa (now the Republic of the Congo)
- Died: 28 March 2012 (aged 72) Paris, France
- Party: Congolese Party of Labour
- Occupation: Agronomist, politician, minister

Bernard Combo-Matsiona (17 December 1939 – 28 March 2012) was an agronomist, politician, cabinet minister, president of the National Assembly and senator of the Republic of Congo.

== Early years ==
Bernard Combo-Matsiona was born of 17 December 1939 in Poto-Poto, Brazzaville, French Equatorial Africa. He was educated in Poto-Poto at the Saint-Vincent A et B primary schools between 1946 and 1852, where he earned a certificate of primary and elementary studies. He then studied at the Chaminade Secondary School in Brazzaville from 1954 to 1958. Combo Matsiona entered the agricultural school in Sainte-Livrade-sur-Lot in Lot-et-Garonne, France, in 1960 and graduated with an agricultural baccalauréat in 1963. That year he was admitted to the Institut Supérieur Agricole in Paris. He graduated in 1966 with as an agricultural works engineer (Ingénieur des Travaux Agricoles).

== Political activism ==
In parallel with his studies, Combo Matsiona was intensely active in politics. In 1963 he joined the Association of Congolese Students (Association des Étudiants Congolais: AEC) in France, where he became the Executive Secretary, in charge of external relations. In this role he participated from 29 June to 2 July 1964 in the Founding Congress of the National Movement of the Revolution (MNR). Combo Matsiona returned to France after the congress for a professional internship at the National Institute of Agronomy and at the Center for Tropical Agronomy Studies until in 1967.

At the age of 28 Combo Matsiona returned to the Congo in November 1967. In 1968, he was appointed Regional Director of Agriculture for Pool Department and Political Commissioner for Camp Lumumba of the National Civil Defense Corps. A year later he held the position of director of the rural renewal action (Action de rénovation rurale: ARR) and in July 1969 became the first President of the Congolese Socialist Youth Union (Union de la Jeunesse Socialiste Congolaise: UJSC) at the end of the constitutive congress.

From 29–31 December 1969 he participated in the Constitutive Congress of the Congolese Party of Labour (Parti Congolais du Travail : PCT) and was elected substitute member of the Central Committee. At the end of the Extraordinary PCT Congress, in 1970 he became a full member of the PCT Central Committee In 1975, he was appointed Director of Studies and Planning at the General Directorate of Agriculture, a position he held until 1979, when he was appointed Director General of the Coffee and Cocoa Office (Office du Café et du Cacao: O.C.C).

== Government career ==
Combo Matsiona began his government career in 1981 at the age of 42. As Minister of Labor, Civil Service and Social Welfare from 1981 to 1987 he was involved in setting up mechanisms that could ensure good social security for workers. He was one of the initiators of the law establishing the Congolese Family Code. As Minister of Health and Social Affairs from 1987 to 1989, it was under his authority that the General Hospital was transformed into the Brazzaville University Hospital Center (CHUB).

Combo Matsiona became President of the National Assembly at the age of 50, holding office from 1989 to 1991. In this position he took part in the Sovereign National Conference of 1991. With the introduction of multi-party politics in the Congo, he joined Bernard Kolélas and the Congolese Movement for Democracy and Integral Development (MCDDI) in 1992. He was appointed political advisor to the founding president of MCDDI. He took an active part in the merger of the PCT with the URD and therefore in the creation of the URD-PCT. In 2006 he was promoted to member of the National Executive Board of MCDDI.

Bernard Combo Matsiona was elected senator of the MCDDI in 2009, following the by-election organized in the Pool Department. He joined the Education, Culture, Science and Technology commission in which he worked until his last days. He died in his second year of office, leaving a family eight children.
