= Justin Lekoundzou =

Congolese politician (1941–2021)

Justin Lekoundzou Itihi Ossetoumba (1941 – 25 November 2021) was a Congolese politician. He was a founding member of the Congolese Labour Party (PCT), and during the PCT's single-party rule he held important party and government positions in the 1970s and 1980s. He served in the government again from 1997 to 2002 and was elected to the National Assembly of Congo-Brazzaville in 2002.

== Political career ==
Lekoundzou was born in Boundji, located in the Cuvette Region of northern French Congo. Under Marien Ngouabi, he was included on the five-member Executive Committee of the ruling National Revolutionary Council (CNR) as President of the Organization Commission on 21 June 1969. When the PCT was founded in December 1969, he became a member of its Political Bureau and was assigned responsibility for state enterprises; he remained on the Political Bureau until December 1971. Lekoundzou was then Minister of Industry, Mines, and Tourism from December 1971 to 30 August 1973. He was also director of the Pointe-Noire oil refinery for a time.

In 1979 Lekoundzou was again elected to the PCT Political Bureau; at that point the body consisted of ten members, and he was assigned responsibility for planning and the economy. Lekoundzou was Minister of Finance from December 1983 until he was instead appointed Minister of Rural Development on 21 August 1987; he held the latter post until he was replaced in the government named on 13 August 1989. Also in 1989, he was assigned responsibility for organization in the PCT Political Bureau and became the regime's second-ranking figure, under President Denis Sassou Nguesso. In the multiparty 1992 parliamentary election, he was elected to the National Assembly as a PCT candidate.

After Sassou Nguesso returned to power in October 1997 at the end of the 1997 civil war, Lekoundzou was appointed Minister of State for Reconstruction and Urban Development on 2 November 1997. After a little more than a year, he was instead appointed Minister to the Presidency in charge of National Defense on 12 January 1999. In the May 2002 parliamentary election, Lekoundzou was elected to the National Assembly as the PCT candidate in Boundji constituency; he received 58.09% of the vote and won the seat in the first round. Following the election, Jacques-Yvon Ndolou was appointed to replace Lekoundzou as Minister to the Presidency in charge of National Defense on 18 August 2002; Ndolou succeeded Lekoundzou in that position on 21 August. Lekoundzou was then chosen as President of the Parliamentary Group of the Presidential Majority on 24 August 2002.

=== Factionalism and political activities in the 2000s ===
Leading the conservative faction of the PCT, Lekoundzou opposed moves by the reformist faction in the party, led by PCT Secretary-General Ambroise Noumazalaye, to transform it into a broader party in the mid-2000s. In doing so, he was apparently also at odds with President Sassou Nguesso, who favored the reform initiative. Lekoundzou and his supporters dominated the PCT Central Committee, while Noumazalaye and his supporters dominated the Political Bureau; their differing visions for the future of the party produced an extended round of intra-party squabbling.

On 31 January 2006, Lekoundzou was flown to France for emergency medical treatment due to a "cerebral affliction", while one of his aides also fell ill; some suspected that they were victims of poisoning. Although it was widely believed that Lekoundzou would die, he survived and returned home to a hero's welcome later in 2006. His return initiated an escalation of the intra-party dispute; trying to gain the upper hand, Lekoundzou called for a party congress, and his faction held its own congress in October 2006. The situation was at least superficially resolved by December 2006, when a party congress involving both factions was held; Lekoundzou was elected to the Political Bureau, but the power of the conservatives in general was weakened. In an early 2007 interview, Sassou Nguesso said that Lekoundzou, who had been living in France for some months, was there for health reasons as far as he knew, not as a result of any bitterness between them.

Together with Jean-Pierre Thystère Tchicaya, the President of the National Assembly, Lekoundzou (who was still President of the Parliamentary Group of the Presidential Majority, but was out of the country due to illness) sent a letter to President Sassou Nguesso on 24 March 2007. In this letter, Lekoundzou and Tchicaya urged the establishment of an independent national electoral commission to oversee the 2007 parliamentary election. The members of the Presidential Majority Parliamentary Group were critical of the approach employed by Lekoundzou and Tchicaya, however.

Lekoundzou was still in France due to illness when the June 2007 parliamentary election was held, but he nevertheless stood for re-election to the National Assembly as the PCT candidate in Boundji constituency. Although he was unable to campaign, he was easily re-elected; he won his seat in the first round with 68.82% of the vote. He did not attend the opening session of the National Assembly on 4 September 2007.

As part of his opposition to the "renovation" of the PCT, Lekoundzou founded the "Marien Ngouabi and Ethics" Association; this association has had a difficult relationship with the rest of the PCT and the authorities. The association's spokesman, Jean-Pierre Lokénia, was arrested on 6 May 2008, and in response, Lekoundzou—who was ill and being treated in Cotonou, Benin—said that he was considering returning to Congo to take Lokénia's place as a prisoner. His wife, Emilienne Lekoundzou, said that the association was founded only as a means of organizing PCT conservatives and was not hostile to the government; she also said that Lekoundzou had obtained Sassou Nguesso's approval before founding the association. On 17 May 2008, the association held its constitutive general assembly and elected Lekoundzou as Honorary President, entrusted with the guidance of the organization, while Marion Madzimba Ehouango was elected as its Executive President and Lekoundzou's wife was elected as Deputy Secretary-General.

He died in Brazzaville on 25 November 2021.
