= 1972 Republic of the Congo coup attempt =

Attempted coup against President Marien Ngouabi

1972 People's Republic of the Congo coup d'état attempt
- Part of the Cold War
Date	February 22, 1972
Location	People's Republic of the Congo
Result	Coup fails: Marien Ngouabi remains in power

Belligerents
People's Republic of the Congo Supported by: North Korea; Soviet Union; Cuba; East Germany	Pro-Ange Diawara faction

On February 22, 1972 a radical-left faction of the ruling PCT attempted a coup against Congolese president Marien Ngouabi. The coup was led by Ange Diawara, along with other Politburo members including Claude-Ernest Ndalla and Jean-Baptiste Ikoko. Joachim Yhombi-Opango was instrumental in ending the coup. The musician Franklin Boukaka was killed in the coup, as was former Minister Élie Théophile Itsihou.

After more than a year of evading capture, Diawara was captured in Kinshasa. He was extradited by the Zairian authorities in April 1973 and executed along with other conspirators shortly afterwards. The bodies of Diawara and Ikoko were publicly exhibited in the Stade de la Révolution.
