= Gérard Bitsindou =

Republic of the Congo politician (1941–2012)

Gérard Bitsindou (15 November 1941 – 26 August 2012) was a Congolese political figure who was President of the Constitutional Court of Congo-Brazzaville from 2003 to 2012. He previously served as Secretary-General of the Presidency from 1980 to 1991 and as Minister for the Contrôle d'Etat from 1997 to 2002.

== Life and career ==
A member of the Lari ethnic group, Bitsindou was born in Mbandza-Ndounga, located in the Pool Region. He was Director of Labour at the Ministry of Labour and the Civil Service before becoming Secretary-General of the Presidency under President Denis Sassou Nguesso; he held the latter post from 1980 to 1991. After Sassou Nguesso returned to power in the 1997 civil war, he appointed Bitsindou as Minister for the Contrôle d'Etat on 2 November 1997. He was subsequently moved to the post of Minister at the Presidency for the Cabinet of the Head of State and the Contrôle d'Etat on 12 January 1999.

In the May–June 2002 parliamentary election, Bitsindou was elected to the National Assembly as an independent candidate from Mbandza-Ndounga constituency; he won the seat in the first round with 54.86% of the vote. He was not included in the government named on 18 August 2002; his ministerial duties were split between two successors, and he handed over control of his ministry on 22 August 2002. A few months later, he was appointed as President of the Constitutional Court by President Sassou Nguesso on 29 January 2003.

Bitsindou was sworn in for another term as President of the Constitutional Council on 15 June 2012, but he died in Paris two months later, on 26 August 2012. His death came at a time when the Constitutional Court was responsible for reviewing legal complaints regarding the July–August 2012 parliamentary election. He was buried at Madibou in Brazzaville on 6 September 2012.
