= Jean-Pierre Thystère Tchicaya =

Congolese politician (1936–2008)

Head of State of the People's Republic of the Congo Acting
- In office 5 February 1979 – 8 February 1979
- Preceded by: Joachim Yhombi-Opango
- Succeeded by: Denis Sassou Nguesso

President of the National Assembly of the Republic of the Congo
- In office 10 August 2002 – 2007
- Preceded by: Justin Koumba (President of the Transitional Council)
- Succeeded by: Justin Koumba

Leader of the Rally for Democracy and Social Progress
- In office 29 October 1990 – 20 June 2008
- Preceded by: Position established
- Succeeded by: Bernard Batchi (Interim)

Mayor of Pointe-Noire
- In office August 1994 – October 1997
- Succeeded by: François Luc Makosso

Personal details
- Born: 7 January 1936 Pointe-Noire, French Congo
- Died: 20 June 2008 (aged 72) Paris, France
- Party: Rally for Democracy and Social Progress (from 1990)
- Other political affiliations: Congolese Party of Labour (until 1980s)

Jean-Pierre Thystère Tchicaya (January 7, 1936 – June 20, 2008) was a Congolese politician. He was briefly acting head of state of Congo-Brazzaville in February 1979 and was President of the National Assembly from 2002 to 2007. He also led a political party, the Rally for Democracy and Social Progress (RDPS), from 1990 to 2008.

== Early career ==
Born in January 1936 in Pointe-Noire, he was a member of an ethnic Vili former royal family of the Kingdom of Loango. Tchicaya studied at an elementary school in Pointe-Noire from 1944 to 1950. Between 1950 and 1957, he studied in Brazzaville, where he earned a Bachelor's Degree in Philosophy. He was sent to study in France in 1957, where he studied École Normale Supérieure in Saint-Cloud. He also obtained a Bachelor's Degree in History Education and worked on a doctorate at Paris-Sorbonne University before being recalled back to Congo in 1965. While in France, he married a Frenchwoman, Blanche Marie Duran in 1961 and had four children: Dominique, Jean Marc, Patricia and Jean Pascal. After he returned, he worked as a director at the Lycée Chaminade (1965–1967), the place where he completed his secondary studies and the École Normale Supérieure de l'Afrique Centrale (1967–1970).

== Political career under single-party rule ==
Tchicaya, a founding member of the Congolese Labour Party (PCT), became Minister of Vocational and Technical Education in December 1971, and in August 1973 his portfolio was expanded to include higher education; he held that post until December 1974. Also during that period, he temporarily assumed responsibility for the portfolio of information, culture, arts, and sports on March 2, 1973 following the arrest of Sylvain Bemba.

Joining the Central Committee of the PCT in December 1972, he held leading posts in the PCT during the 1970s. From December 1974 to December 1975, he was President of the PCT Central Commission of Control and Verification. As a political commissar of Pool region, he also became a member of the Special Revolutionary General Staff that was formed on 12 December 1975. He was included on the Council of State announced on January 8, 1976. He served briefly as acting head of state during the transition from Yhombi-Opango to Sassou Nguesso. Shortly after Denis Sassou Nguesso became president in early 1979, Tchicaya was elected as Vice-President by an extraordinary PCT party congress on March 31, 1979. In February 1983, he was named as president of the Banque Commerciale Congolaise and later accused by Claude-Ernest Ndalla of treason and plotting against the regime. From March 1979 to July 1984, he was a member of the PCT Political Bureau in charge of ideology and education and was the second ranking leader of the PCT. He was removed from all his positions in the party, including his seat on the Central Committee, and was placed under house arrest for two years in 1984. Although this decision was not officially explained, some speculated that Tchicaya was believed to have been involved in 1982 bomb attacks in Brazzaville. In August 1986, the Revolutionary Court of Justice sentenced Claude-Ernest Ndalla to death for those bomb attacks; Tchicaya was also tried, along with ten others, and he was given a five-year suspended sentence. He was subsequently amnestied in 1988.

== Political career after 1990 ==
After splitting from the PCT, Tchicaya was part of the opposition National Union for Democracy and Progress (UNDP; Union National pour la Démocratie et le Progrès) at the beginning of the transition to multiparty democracy, but he left the UNDP to found another opposition party, the RDPS, on October 29, 1990. He was a delegate at the 1991 Sovereign National Conference, and at the Conference he famously declared "never again!" (plus jamais ça!).

Standing as the RDPS candidate in the August 1992 presidential election, he placed fifth with 5.78% of the vote. His best showing was in Kouilou Region (which includes Pointe-Noire, the country's second-largest city and economic capital), where he obtained 28% of the vote and placed second behind Pascal Lissouba. Tchicaya backed Bernard Kolélas of the Congolese Movement for Democracy and Integral Development (MCDDI) in the second round, but Lissouba defeated Kolélas.

After President Lissouba lost his parliamentary majority, he dissolved the National Assembly in preparation for a new parliamentary election. This led to a political crisis and the formation of a new government under Prime Minister Claude Antoine Dacosta that incorporated both Lissouba's supporters and members of the Union for Democratic Renewal (URD)–PCT opposition coalition. In this government, appointed on 25 December 1992, Tchicaya was Minister of Mines, Energy and Hydrocarbons. Dacosta's "60/40" government remained in place until the time of the May–June 1993 parliamentary election, in which Tchicaya won a seat in the National Assembly. The URD-PCT opposition coalition rejected the election results as fraudulent and formed a rival government in which Tchicaya was prime minister; he was also named Minister of National Defense and Minister of Hydrocarbons in the rival government. From 1993 to 1997 he was President of the URD Parliamentary Group. He was elected as Mayor of Pointe-Noire in July 1994, serving as Mayor from August 1994 to October 1997.

During the 1997 civil war, Tchicaya was the Second Vice-President of the National Mediation Committee, which was chaired by URD leader Bernard Kolélas and established in June 1997. After Kolélas was appointed prime minister, he formed a government on September 14, 1997 that included Tchicaya as Minister of State for Decentralization and Regional Development; this government fell only one month later, on October 14, 1997, when rebel forces loyal to former president and PCT leader Denis Sassou Nguesso captured Brazzaville. A few days later, Tchicaya announced the support of the RDPS for Sassou Nguesso.

At the end of the transitional period that followed the war, Tchicaya was elected to the National Assembly in the 2002 parliamentary election as the RDPS candidate in Pointe Noire's Mvou Mvou constituency; he won the seat in the first round with 68.55% of the vote. Following the parliamentary election, Tchicaya was elected as President of the National Assembly on August 10, 2002; he received 122 votes from the 128 deputies who voted. Additionally, when the Pan-African Parliament began meeting in March 2004, he became one of Congo's five members.

Tchicaya was critical of the way the 2007 parliamentary election was organized. Together with Justin Lekoundzou, the President of the Parliamentary Group of the Presidential Majority, Tchicaya sent a letter to President Sassou Nguesso on March 24, 2007. In this letter, Tchicaya and Lekoundzou urged the establishment of an independent national electoral commission to oversee the election. In the election, Tchicaya was re-elected as the RDPS candidate from Mvou Mvou 1 constituency in Pointe-Noire. He faced seven challengers and prevailed with 55.20% of the vote when the election was held over again in his constituency in July 2007 due to problems that plagued the first attempt. When the National Assembly held its first meeting of the new parliamentary term on September 4, 2007, Justin Koumba of the PCT was elected to succeed Tchicaya as President of the National Assembly.

== Death ==
Tchicaya was falsely reported to have died in Paris in October 2007. He subsequently died at the Georges Pompidou European Hospital in Paris on June 20, 2008. Prime Minister Isidore Mvouba described Tchicaya as a "great statesman" and a "worthy son of our country", and he said that Tchicaya had "always shown great consistency in his commitment to the values of the Republic and democracy" as a deputy in the National Assembly. Tchicaya's body was returned to Brazzaville from Paris on July 4, and he was the subject of an official tribute in the Palace of the Parliament on July 5. His body was then taken to Pointe-Noire on July 5 for his funeral and burial. This was marked by some disorder. Youths in the second arrondissement of Pointe-Noire initially refused to allow his coffin to be transferred from the Kokolo Copa Stadium to the Franco Anselmi Stadium, which was the site of the funeral, although they surrendered it after negotiations. Some looting and arrests occurred. After the funeral on July 7, he was buried at his family cemetery of Mboukou, located in the city's third arrondissement, Tié-Tié.

Political offices
Preceded by Joachim Yhombi-Opango	Head of State of the People's Republic of Congo; 1979	Succeeded by Denis Sassou Nguesso
