= 2026 in the Republic of the Congo =

- Decades: 2000s; 2010s; 2020s
- See also: Other events of 2026; History of the Republic of the Congo

Events in the year 2026 in the Republic of the Congo.

== Incumbents ==
- President: Denis Sassou Nguesso
- Prime Minister: Anatole Collinet Makosso
- Cabinet: Anatole Collinet Makosso's government

== Events ==
- 26 January – Two executives of Hemla Africa Holding, a subsidiary of Norwegian energy firm PetroNor E&P, are charged with paying $25 million in bribes to president Sassou Nguesso and his family.
- 10 March – Jean-Guy Blaise Mayolas, president of Fédération Congolaise de Football, is convicted in absentia in Brazzaville of embezzlement, money laundering, and forgery related to misused FIFA funds; he and his family receive life sentences.
- 15 March – 2026 Republic of the Congo presidential election: Denis Sassou Nguesso is reelected to a fifth term as president with 94.82% of the vote.
- 16 April – Denis Sassou Nguesso is inaugurated for a new five-year term as president at a ceremony in Kintélé.
- 25 May – The government announces visa-free entry to citizens of all African nations effective 2027.
- 24 August – Prince Harry officially steps down from the board of African Parks, after the wildlife charity acknowledged human rights abuses by its rangers against members of the Baka community in Odzala-Kokoua National Park.
- 27 October – Confirmed cases of ebola in the Republic of the Congo surpass 10,000.

== Holidays ==
- 1 January – New Year's Day
- 6 April – Easter Monday
- 1 May – Labour Day
- 14 May – Ascension Day
- 25 May – Whit Monday
- 10 June – Reconciliation Day
- 15 August – National day
- 1 November – All Saints' Day
- 28 November – Republic Day
- 25 December – Christmas Day

== Deaths ==
- 17 February – Firmin Ayessa, 74, MP (since 2002).
- 18 February – Philippe Mvouo, 74, politician.
- 28 April – Ange Édouard Poungui, 84, prime minister (1984–1989).
- 11 July – Jean-Paul Pigasse, 86, French-born journalist, director-general of ADIAC (since 1997).

== See also ==
- African Continental Free Trade Area
