= 2027 in the Republic of the Congo =

- Decades: 2000s; 2010s; 2020s
- See also: Other events of 2027; History of the Republic of the Congo

Events in the year 2027 in the Republic of the Congo.

== Incumbents ==
- President: Denis Sassou Nguesso
- Prime Minister: Anatole Collinet Makosso
- Cabinet: Anatole Collinet Makosso's government

== Events ==
=== Scheduled ===
- July: 2027 Republic of the Congo parliamentary election.

== Holidays ==
- 1 January – New Year's Day
- 28 March – Easter Monday
- 1 May – Labour Day
- 14 May – Ascension Day
- 16 May – Whit Monday
- 10 June – Reconciliation Day
- 15 August – National day
- 1 November – All Saints' Day
- 28 November – Republic Day
- 25 December – Christmas Day

== See also ==
- African Continental Free Trade Area
