= 2020 in the Republic of the Congo =

- Decades: 2000s; 2010s; 2020s
- See also: Other events of 2020; History of the Republic of the Congo

Events in the year 2020 in the Republic of the Congo.

== Incumbents ==
- President: Denis Sassou Nguesso

== Events ==
- March 14 – First confirmed case of COVID-19 in the Republic of the Congo
- August 25 – Guyvanho, nicknamed "the butcher of Nouabale Ndoki", was sentenced to 30 years in prison for ivory trafficking and attempted murder of park rangers.

== Deaths ==
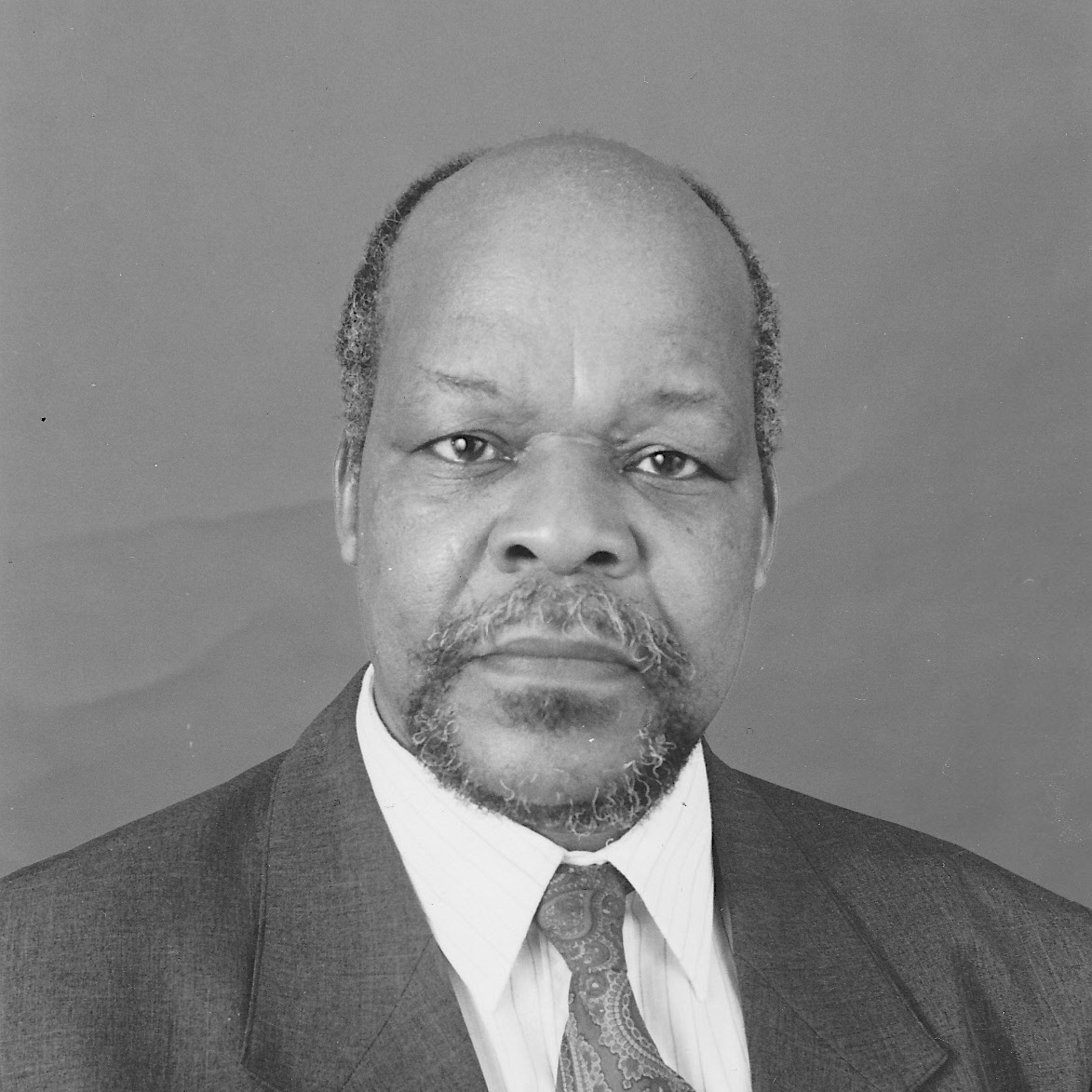
Aloïse Moudileno-Massengo

- 6 January – Aloïse Moudileno-Massengo, politician and lawyer, vice President (b. 1933).
- 19 March – Aurlus Mabélé, singer and composer (b. 1953).
- 28 March – Jean-Claude Ganga, sports administrator (b. 1934).
- 30 March – Joachim Yhombi-Opango, politician, President and Prime Minister (b. 1939).
- 8 April – François Luc Macosso, politician (b. 1938).
- 23 June – Jean-Michel Bokamba-Yangouma, trade unionist and politician.
- 24 August – Pascal Lissouba, 88, Congolese politician, President (1992–1997) and Prime Minister (1963–1966), complications from Alzheimer's disease.
- 23 December – King Makosso IV, 76, King of Loango (since 2009).

== See also ==
- COVID-19 pandemic in the Republic of the Congo
- 2020 in Middle Africa
