= COVID-19 pandemic in Congo =

COVID-19 pandemic in Congo may refer to:

- COVID-19 pandemic in the Democratic Republic of the Congo
- COVID-19 pandemic in the Republic of the Congo
