= 2021 in the Republic of the Congo =

- Decades: 2000s; 2010s; 2020s
- See also: Other events of 2021; History of the Republic of the Congo

Events in the year 2021 in the Republic of the Congo.

== Incumbents ==
- President: Denis Sassou Nguesso
- Prime Minister: Anatole Collinet Makosso
- Cabinet: Anatole Collinet Makosso's government

== Events ==
COVID-19 pandemic in the Republic of the Congo

- 1 January – Six militia members are killed during clashes between the Nduma Defense of Congo-Renovated and Mai-Mai Kabido in Bukumbirwa.
- 4 January – Twenty-two people are killed during an Allied Democratic Forces mass stabbing at a village in North Kivu, Democratic Republic of the Congo.
- 10 January – At least six park rangers in the Virunga National Park in Rutshuru, North Kivu, Democratic Republic of the Congo, are killed in an ambush. A Mai-Mai militia is suspected to have committed the attack.
- 12 January – A barge travelling from Kisangani to the town of Basoko in Tshopo, Democratic Republic of the Congo, sinks in the Congo River. Local authorities report that at least six people were killed and 19 others are missing.
- 7 February – The health ministry of the Democratic Republic of the Congo announces a "resurgence" of the Ebola virus in the country's eastern side, after it was reported that a woman there died from the disease four days prior. The announcement comes three months after the World Health Organization declared an end to the Kivu Ebola outbreak in the country's Équateur province.
- 11 February – The Democratic Republic of Congo reports its second death of the Ebola virus outbreak in North Kivu province.
- 14 February – Militants of the Islamic State's Central Africa Province raid the town of Ndalya in the Ituri Province of the Democratic Republic of the Congo, killing 11 civilians and three members of the armed forces.
- 15 February –
  - 2021 Congo River disaster: A passenger barge crashes and capsizes on the Congo River in Mai-Ndombe Province, Democratic Republic of the Congo, killing at least 60 people, while 240 others are reported missing. At least 300 people have been rescued from the river.
  - An Ebola vaccination campaign begins in the city of Butembo, in the eastern Democratic Republic of the Congo. Health workers are the first to be vaccinated.
- 23 February – Suspected ADF militants kill 13 people during two attacks in Beni, North Kivu, Democratic Republic of the Congo.
- 25 February – Seven civilians are killed by CODECO militiamen in Banyari Kilo sector, Djugu Territory, Democratic Republic of the Congo.
- 26 February –
  - Six gunmen open fire on a World Food Programme convoy in North Kivu, Democratic Republic of the Congo, killing Italian ambassador Luca Attanasio, a carabiniere and their driver.
  - An NGO vice-president met with 70 members of the Twa and Bantu in Nyunzu, Democratic Republic of the Congo, to ensure lasting peace in the Nyunzu Territory.
  - The Allied Democratic Forces (ADF) kill three civilians in an ambush on the Beni-Kasindi road. Congolese and MONUSCO troops positioned nearby then clashed with the ADF, forcing them to retreat.
- 28 February – Ten civilians are killed, of whom eight have been decapitated and two shot, in two ADF overnight attacks in Boyo and Kainama, Democratic Republic of the Congo.
- 21 March – 2021 Republic of the Congo presidential election. Provisional results show that President Denis Sassou Nguesso was re-elected with more than 88% of the vote. However, Mathias Dzon, who came in third, alleged vote-rigging and called for annulation of the results. The party of Guy Brice Parfait Kolélas, who died hours after the polls closed, alleged fraud based on vote tally sheets at three polling stations.
- 15 May – Anatole Collinet Makosso's government is established.

== See also ==
- African Continental Free Trade Area
- COVID-19 pandemic in Africa

== Deaths ==
- 10 January – Christopher Maboulou, footballer (born 1990).
- 12 February – Bernard Nsayi, 78, Roman Catholic prelate, Bishop of Nkayi (1990–2001).
- 22 March – Guy Brice Parfait Kolélas, 61, politician, deputy (since 2007); COVID-19.
