= 2017 in the Republic of the Congo =

- Decades: 1990s; 2000s; 2010s; 2020s
- See also: Other events of 2017; History of the Republic of the Congo

This is a list of events in the year 2017 in the Republic of the Congo.

== Incumbents ==
- President: Denis Sassou Nguesso

== Events ==
- Ongoing since April 2016 – the Pool War
- 16 July – Republic of the Congo parliamentary election, 2017

=== Sport ===
- Congo at the 2017 World Championships in Athletics

== Deaths ==
- 7 May – Auguste Batina, politician (b. 1936).
- 9 August – Raymond Damase Ngollo, general (b. 1936)
