= History of the Congo =

History of the Congo can refer to:

- History of the Republic of the Congo
- History of the Democratic Republic of the Congo
