= 2022 in the Republic of the Congo =

- Decades: 2000s; 2010s; 2020s
- See also: Other events of 2022; History of the Republic of the Congo

Events in the year 2022 in the Republic of the Congo.

== Incumbents ==
- President: Denis Sassou Nguesso
- Prime Minister: Anatole Collinet Makosso
- Cabinet: Anatole Collinet Makosso's government

== Events ==
Ongoing — COVID-19 pandemic in the Republic of the Congo

- 31 July – 2022 Republic of the Congo parliamentary election: The second round of the parliamenentary election takes place.

== See also ==
- African Continental Free Trade Area
- COVID-19 pandemic in Africa

== Deaths ==
- 10 January – Martin Parfait Aimé Coussoud-Mavoungou, politician (born 1959)
- 23 July – Henri Elendé, Olympic high jumper (born 1941)
