= Sardoine Mia =

Congolese painter (born 1998)

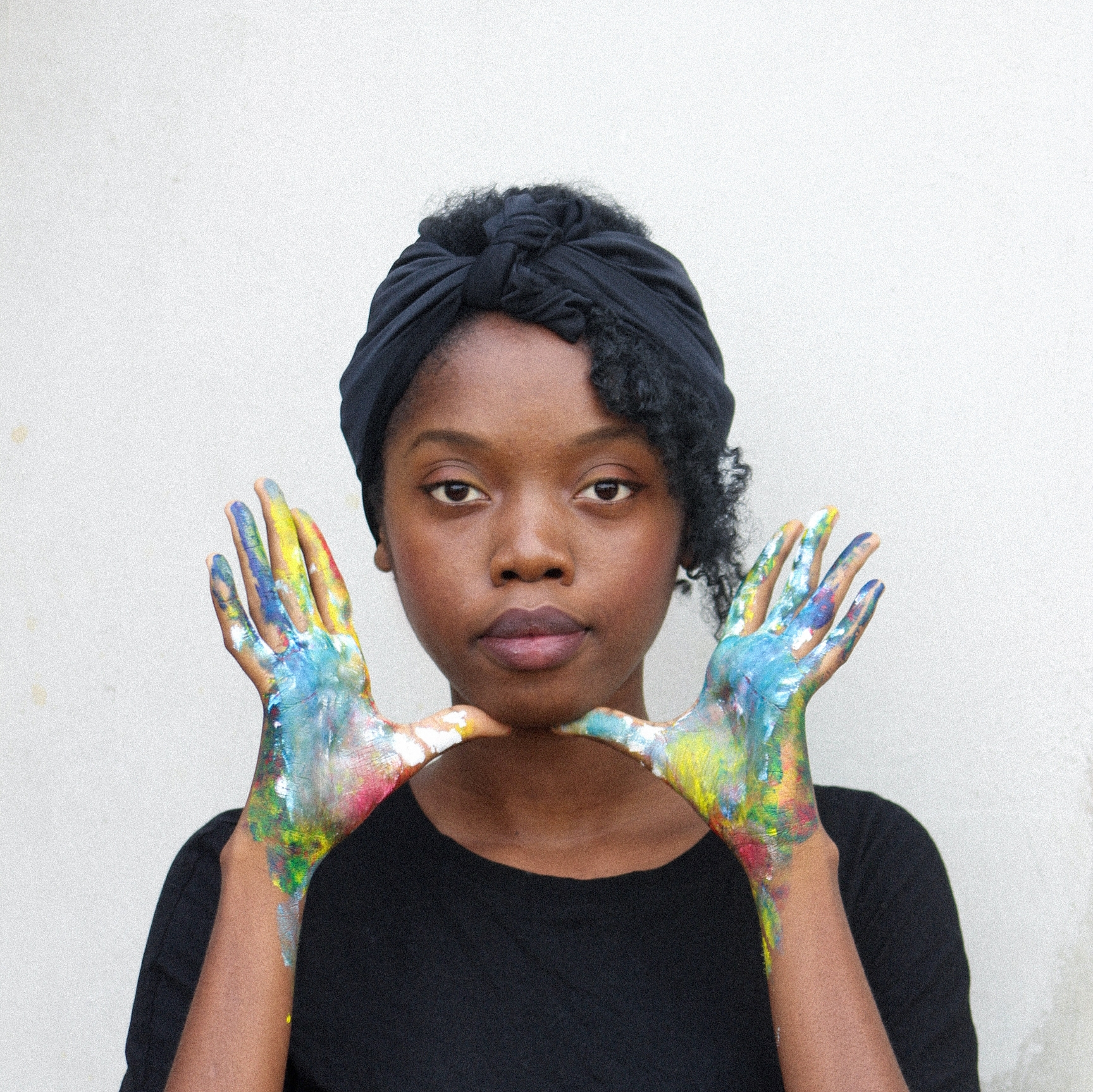
- Self-portrait in 2020
- Born: 30 May 1998 (age 27); Pointe-Noire, Republic of the Congo
- Style: Contemporary art
- Website: www.sardoine.art

Sardoine Bible Miambanzila (Note: French pronunciation: [saʁdwan bibl mjɑ̃bɑ̃zila].) (born 30 May 1998), better known as Sardoine Mia, (Note: French pronunciation: [saʁdwan mia].) is a Congolese visual artist whose work draws on her experiences living in Brazzaville. She was the recipient of an award by the Prince Claus Fund in 2021, and was awarded the Faces of Peace Art Prize in 2022.

== Life and career ==
Born in Pointe-Noire, Republic of the Congo in 1998, Mia spent her childhood in Brazzaville and draws inspiration from her experiences of living there. Her father was a musician and her mother was a seamstress. She was a rebellious teenager and used art to support her mental health. She has spoken publicly about the support her sister has given to her career.

Describing herself as a self-taught artist, her contemporary art practice spans the mediums of painting, drawing and installation. Her work is textural, with the surfaces of many paintings resembling concrete. She began her professional life in the contemporary art centre Les Ateliers Sahm. She subsequently was an artist-in-residence for the Swiss institution Arbeitsgruppe Gästeatelier Krone Aarau. The resultant exhibition of her works was held in Brazzaville in 2021 and was entitled Elle se branche où la prise de conscience ("Where does my awareness come from?") This body of work was partly inspired by the COVID-19 pandemic. In 2021 her work also featured in the group exhibition M'ke, which focussed on women's lives and experiences, at Kub'art Gallery. Mia has lived in France since 2021, citing readier access to artistic opportunities and travel routes as her reasons for emigration.

In 2020 Mia was nominated the Adicom Award for Young Talent – these awards celebrate digital creativity in Francophone Africa. Other nominees from the Republic of Congo alongside Mia were musician Natty Stelle Kokolo, entrepreneur Emmanuel Nkete, and digital consultants Biberic Lokwa and Restra Poaty. In 2021, she was awarded the Dutch Prince Claus Seed Award. In 2022 she was awarded the Faces of Peace Art Prize, by Contemporary Art Curator Magazine.

== Awards ==
- 2017: International Contemporary Art Meeting Prize
- 2021: Prince Claus Seed Award, awarded by the Prince Claus Fund, Netherlands
- 2022: Faces of Peace Art Prize, Contemporary Art Curator Magazine, Spain
