= 2023 in the Republic of the Congo =

- Decades: 2000s; 2010s; 2020s
- See also: Other events of 2023; History of the Republic of the Congo

Events in the year 2023 in the Republic of the Congo.

== Incumbents ==
- President: Denis Sassou Nguesso
- Prime Minister: Anatole Collinet Makosso
- Cabinet: Anatole Collinet Makosso's government

== Events ==
Ongoing — COVID-19 pandemic in the Republic of the Congo

- 4 January – Severe flooding is reported in the north of the country.
- 20 November – 2023 Brazzaville Stampede: Thirty-seven people are killed and several others are injured in a stampede at a stadium in Brazzaville, during a military recruitment event.

== See also ==
- African Continental Free Trade Area
- COVID-19 pandemic in Africa
