= 2019 in the Republic of the Congo =

- Decades: 1990s; 2000s; 2010s; 2020s
- See also: Other events of 2019; History of the Republic of the Congo

Events in the year 2019 in the Republic of the Congo.

== Incumbents ==
- President: Denis Sassou Nguesso

== Events ==
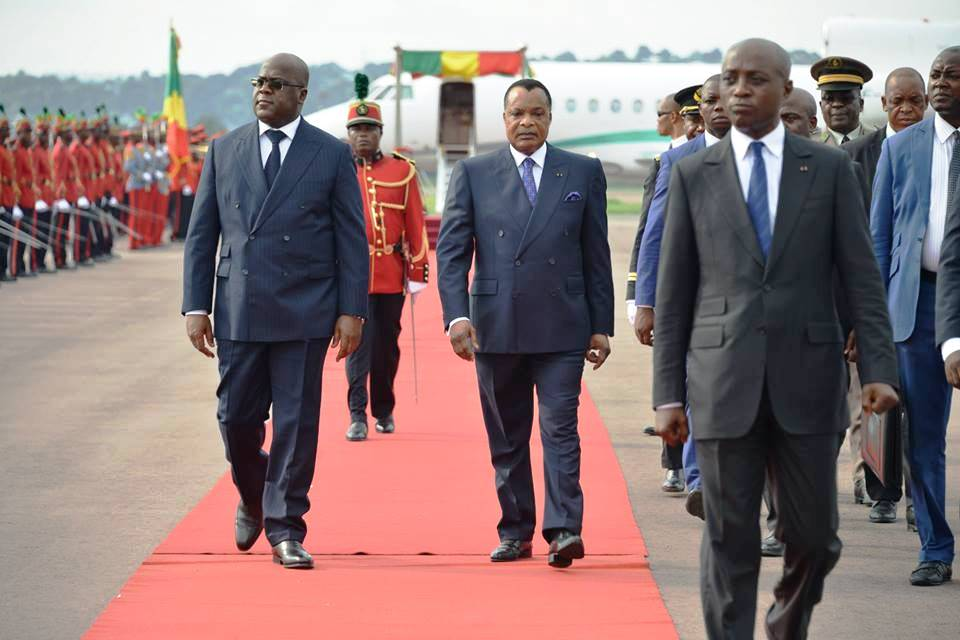
7 February 2019: President Félix Tshisekedi (Democratic Republic of the Congo) and president Denis Sassou Nguesso (Republic of the Congo) at Brazzaville airport

- 7 February: President Félix Tshisekedi (Democratic Republic of the Congo) and president Denis Sassou Nguesso (Republic of the Congo) meet
- October: 2019–2020 Congo River floods: Torrential rains causes floods along the Congo and Ubangi rivers causing the displacement of thousands of people.

== Sports ==
- 19 August: Republic of the Congo at the 2019 African Games.
