= 2025 in the Republic of the Congo =

- Decades: 2000s; 2010s; 2020s
- See also: Other events of 2025; History of the Republic of the Congo

Events in the year 2025 in the Republic of the Congo.

== Incumbents ==
- President: Denis Sassou Nguesso
- Prime Minister: Anatole Collinet Makosso
- Cabinet: Anatole Collinet Makosso's government

== Events ==
- 6 February – FIFA imposes an indefinite suspension on the Congolese Football Federation, citing interference by third parties in the affairs of the organisation amid an ongoing conflict with the Ministry of Sport.
- 11 May – Lassy Mbouity, the leader of the opposition Les Socialistes Congolais party, is abducted in Brazzaville.
- 4 June – US President Donald Trump issues a proclamation barring Congolese nationals from entering the United States.
- 29 November – Deposed Guinea-Bissau president Umaro Sissoco Embaló goes into exile in the Republic of the Congo from Senegal following the 2025 Guinea-Bissau coup d'état.

== Holidays ==
- 1 January – New Year's Day
- 21 April – Easter Monday
- 1 May – Labour Day
- 29 May – Ascension Day
- 9 June – Whit Monday
- 10 June – Reconciliation Day
- 15 August – National day
- 1 November – All Saints' Day
- 28 November – Republic Day
- 25 December – Christmas Day

== See also ==
- African Continental Free Trade Area
