= Les Dépêches de Brazzaville =

Republic of the Congo newspaper

- Owner: Jean-Paul Pigasse
- Language: French
- Website: lesdepechesdebrazzaville.fr

Les Dépêches de Brazzaville is a French-language daily newspaper in the Republic of the Congo. It is published by ADIAC, owned by Jean-Paul Pigasse.

== Description ==
Les Dépêches de Brazzaville is published by the Central African News Agency (Agence d'information d'Afrique centrale). The daily newspaper is published Monday through Friday, has a circulation of approximately 10,000 copies, and is distributed throughout the country.

Les Dépêches de Brazzaville maintains offices in Paris, France, and Kinshasa, Democratic Republic of the Congo (DRC), and covers news from across the Central African region.

The publication's director is the French national Jean-Paul Pigasse.

A daily print edition, sold by street vendors, has been distributed in Kinshasa, DRC, since early 2009. The entire newspaper is available online in PDF format.

== See also ==
- Media of the Republic of the Congo
