= 2026 Republic of the Congo presidential election =

- 15 March 2026
- Registered: 3,155,751
- Turnout: 84.99% (▲17.82pp)
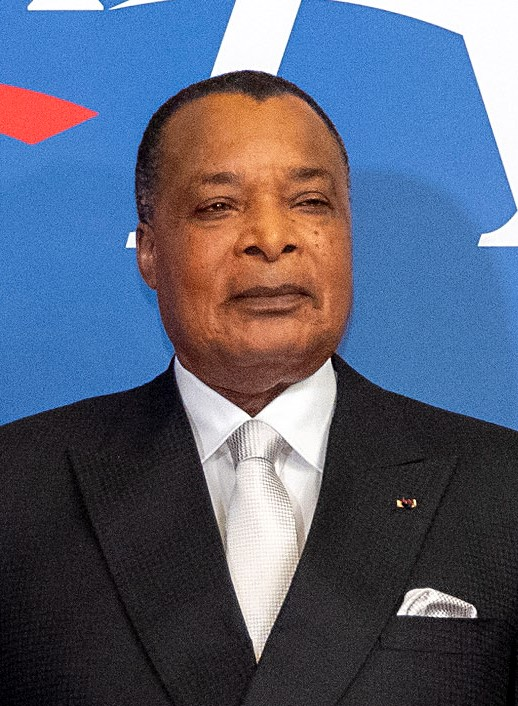

Nominee	Denis Sassou Nguesso	Mavoungou Zinga Mabio
Party	PCT	2AD26
Popular vote	2,509,456	37,141
Percentage	94.90%	1.40%
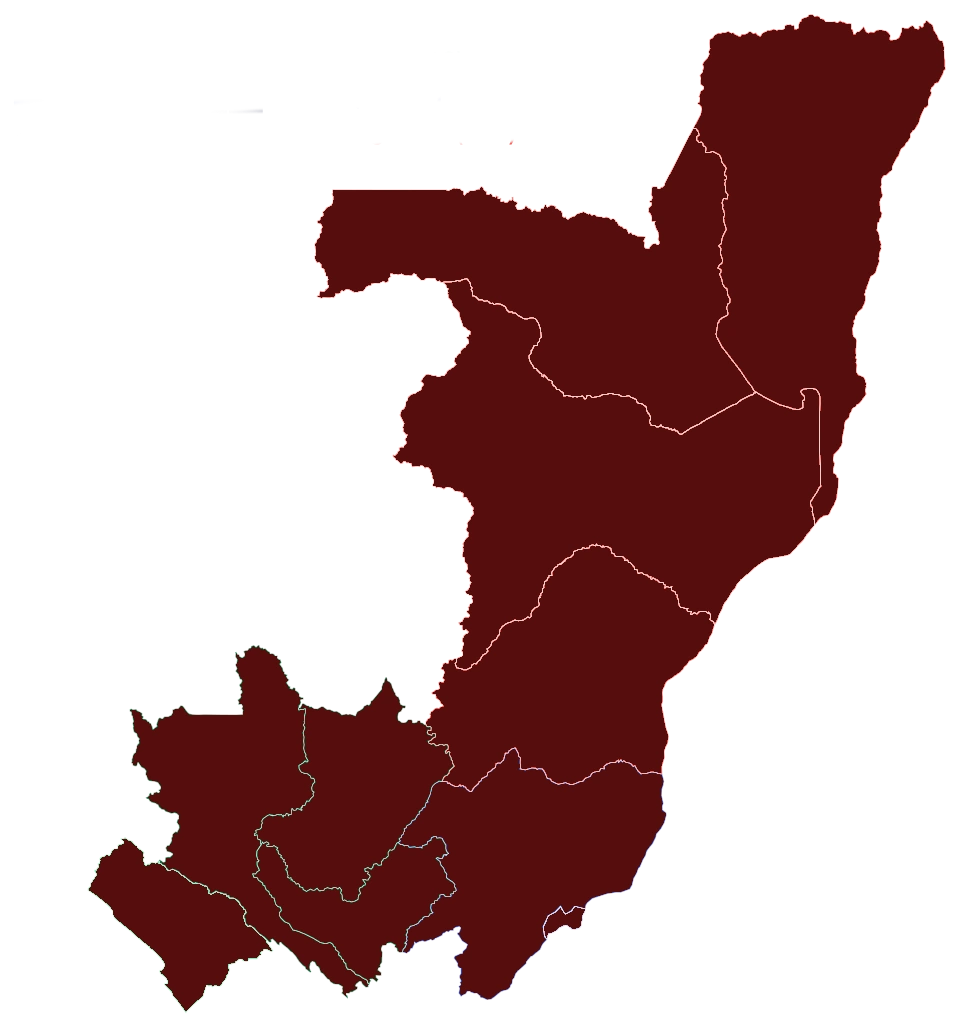
President before election
Denis Sassou Nguesso
PCT
Elected President
Denis Sassou Nguesso
PCT

Presidential elections were held in the Republic of the Congo on 15 March 2026. Incumbent president Denis Sassou Nguesso of the Congolese Party of Labour stood for re-election against six other candidates. Sassou Nguesso has ruled the Republic of the Congo since 1997, and previously held the presidency from 1979 to 1992.

The elections were held amid widespread allegations of unfair electoral practices. Major opposition parties boycotted the vote, human rights activists were arrested in the lead-up to polling day, and a nationwide internet blackout occurred on election day. Sassou Nguesso was the only candidate permitted to travel the country to campaign.

Provisional results announced by Interior Minister Raymond Mboulou on 17 March declared Sassou Nguesso re-elected to a fifth term with 95% of the vote, on a reported turnout of 85%. His closest challenger, Alliance for Democratic Alternation candidate Mavoungou Zinga Mabio, received 1.5% of the vote. The reported turnout stood in contrast to observations of short or empty queues at polling stations in the capital Brazzaville.

== Electoral system ==
The President of the Republic of the Congo is elected for a five-year term, with the possibility of a maximum of two re-elections. In the election, only the candidate who obtains an absolute majority of valid votes is elected. If no candidate reaches that majority, the two candidates with the highest votes face a second round twenty-one days after the results are announced by the Constitutional Court. The age limit of 70 years was removed by a referendum in 2015. A revision of the electoral rolls began in September and lasted until December 2025.

== Background ==
Denis Sassou Nguesso has been president of the Republic of the Congo since 1997, and previously held the position from 1979 to 1992. He won the 2002, 2009, 2016, and 2021 elections.

The 2021 election was boycotted by the Pan-African Union for Social Democracy (UPADS). Freedom House gave the Republic of the Congo a 2/40 for political rights in its 2024 report.

== Candidates ==
In 2023, the Rally for Democracy and Development (RDD), Movement of Republicans (MR), and the People's Party (PAPE) formed a united opposition, the Alliance for Democratic Alternation in 2026 (2AD2026). RDD was the political party of Joachim Yhombi-Opango, who served as president from 1977 to 1979.

Lassy Mbouity, the leader of Les Socialistes Congolais, declared his candidacy for the election. However, he was kidnapped on 11 May 2025.

Nguesso's son Denis-Christel Sassou Nguesso was elected to the National Assembly. It was believed that Nguesso is grooming his son to succeed him. However, in December 2025, the ruling Congolese Party of Labour nominated the elder Nguesso as its presidential candidate following a three-day congress. He subsequently confirmed his candidacy on 5 February 2026.

The opposition Pan-African Union for Social Democracy said it would not field a candidate in the election.

On 20 February 2026, the Constitutional Court validated seven candidates for the election; Denis Sassou Nguesso (Congolese Party of Labour), Nganguia Engambé Anguios (independent), Joseph Kignoumbi Kia Mboungou (La Chaine), Mafoula Uphrem Dave (independent), Mavoungou Zinga Mabio (Alliance), Manangou Vivien Romain (independent) and Gavet Elengo Melaine Destin (Republican Movement).

== Campaign ==
Campaigning began on 28 February and ended on 13 March. The campaign period was heavily dominated toward Sassou Nguesso, as he was the only candidate allowed to travel around the country to canvass for votes. Effigies of Sassou Nguesso were observed in Brazzaville, and major parties boycotted the elections over allegations of unfair electoral practices. Ahead of the vote, human rights activists were arrested, several opposition parties were suspended, and public gatherings were closely monitored.

== Conduct ==
Voting opened at 07:00 WAT and closed at 18:00 WAT. A nationwide internet blackout occurred that same day.

== Results ==
Provisional results, which were announced by Interior Minister Raymond Mboulou on 17 March, revealed that the incumbent president, Denis Sassou Nguesso, was re-elected to a fifth term with 94.82% of the vote. Mboulou reported that the turnout of the election was 84.65%, with a total of 2.6 million ballots cast. However, this was in contrast to polling stations in Brazzaville being observed to have short lines or no lines at all. AAD candidate Mabio Mavoungou Zinga, the closest challenger to Sassou Nguesso, won 1.48% of the vote. Independent candidate Uphrem Dave Mafoula followed in third place with 1.03% of the vote.

Candidate	Party	Votes	%
Denis Sassou Nguesso	Congolese Party of Labour	2,509,456	94.90
Mavoungou Zinga Mabio	Alliance for Democratic Alternation in 2026	37,141	1.40
Uphrem Dave Mafoula	Independent	27,254	1.03
Destin Gavet	Republican Movement	23,060	0.87
Joseph Kignoumbi Kia Mboungou	La Chaine	22,744	0.86
Vivien Romain Manangou	Independent	15,994	0.60
Nganguia Engambé Anguios	Party for the Action of the Republic	8,694	0.33
Total		2,644,343	100.00
Valid votes		2,644,343	98.60
Invalid/blank votes		37,578	1.40
Total votes		2,681,921	100.00
Registered voters/turnout		3,155,751	84.99
Source: Constitutional Court

== Aftermath ==
After Sassou Nguesso's re-election was confirmed by the constitutional court on 28 March, he was sworn in for his fifth term on 16 April. Sassou Nguesso is forbidden from standing for re-election in 2031.
