= Matthieu Pigasse =

French investment banker

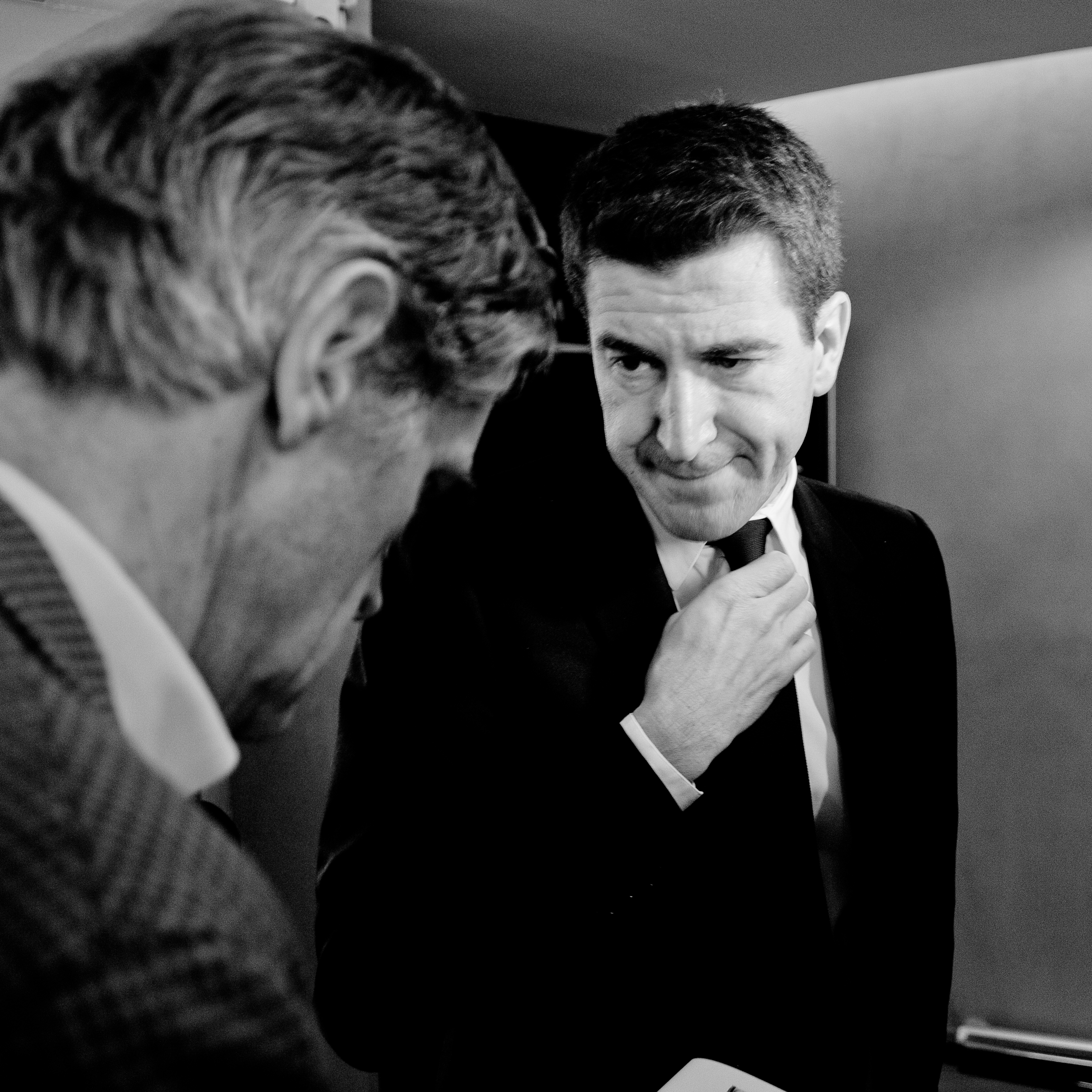
- Pigasse in 2012
- Born: 25 May 1968 (age 58); Clichy-la-Garenne, France
- Education: Sciences Po Paris; École nationale d'administration
- Occupations: Investment banker, investor
- Parent: Jean-Daniel Pigasse
- Relatives: Jean-Paul Pigasse (uncle)

Matthieu Pigasse (French pronunciation: [matjø piɡas]; born 25 May 1968) is a French investment banker, media mogul and investor. He was Lazard's Global Head of Mergers and Acquisitions and Sovereign Advisory, as well as CEO of Lazard France. He is now head of Centerview Partners in France.

== Early life ==
Pigasse was born on 25 May 1968, in Clichy near Paris. He grew up in Normandy, rural France. His father, Jean-Daniel Pigasse, was a journalist for La Manche libre. His uncle, Jean-Paul Pigasse, was a media proprietor.

He graduated from the Sciences Po and the École nationale d'administration.

== Career as a financial advisor ==
Matthieu Pigasse started his career in 1994 at the French Treasury where he was in charge of the debt and cash management of the French State. He became advisor in charge of financial and industrial affairs for the Ministry of the Economy, Finances and Industry under Minister Dominique Strauss-Kahn from 1998 to 1999. He then served as chief of staff to Finance Minister Laurent Fabius from 2000 to 2002.

Pigasse became a managing director at the investment bank Lazard in 2002. He was appointed Global head of Sovereign Advisory in 2003, working on some of the most important sovereign debt restructurings in the last decade: Iraq, Ecuador, Argentina, Cyprus and Greece. He is also one of the most active bankers in Europe in mergers & acquisitions, advising on deals such as "the $40bn merger of Suez and Gaz de France (to become GDF Suez) or the L’Oréal buy-back of Nestlé shares." Additionally, he advised Caisse d'Epargne to acquire a stake in Lazard.

He was appointed CEO of Lazard France in 2009, the Vice Chairman of Lazard Europe in 2011 and Global head of Mergers & Acquisitions at Lazard in April 2015.

He is a board member of BSkyB, Groupe Lucien Barrière and Derichebourg.

== Media business ==
Pigasse's family had long been involved in owning or directing media – mostly newspaper publications.

Pigasse himself has been active in the media business, selling Newsweb to Arnaud Lagardère, advising Murdoch about Eurosport, helping Pink TV, as well as offering financial support to the pure player Rue89.

Since 2010, he has also become the co-owner, along with Xavier Niel and Pierre Bergé, of Le Monde, one of the main daily newspapers of France (politically, centre-left), as well as owner of the weekly magazine L’Obs (since 2014). In October 2018, staff at Le Monde learned that Pigasse had sold 49% of his stake in the company to Czech businessman Daniel Křetínský. Le Monde's Independency Group, a minority shareholder that aims to protect the paper's editorial independence, had not been informed of the sale, and asked Pigasse and Křetínský to sign an "approval agreement" that would give the Independency Group the right to approve or reject any controlling shareholder. As of September 2019, they had not done so.

Through his personal holding company LNEI, he acquired the music magazine Les Inrockuptibles in 2009 and Radio Nova in 2015. He is also a shareholder in the French version of the Huffington Post, Melty Group and Vice France.

In 2015, he was appointed chairman of les Eurockéennes in Belfort, one of the largest rock festivals in Europe. In 2016, he raised €250 million with Xavier Niel and Pierre-Antoine Capton to found Mediawan, a special purpose acquisition company (SPAC), with the ambition to become one of the largest media content and entertainment platforms in Europe.

== Politics ==
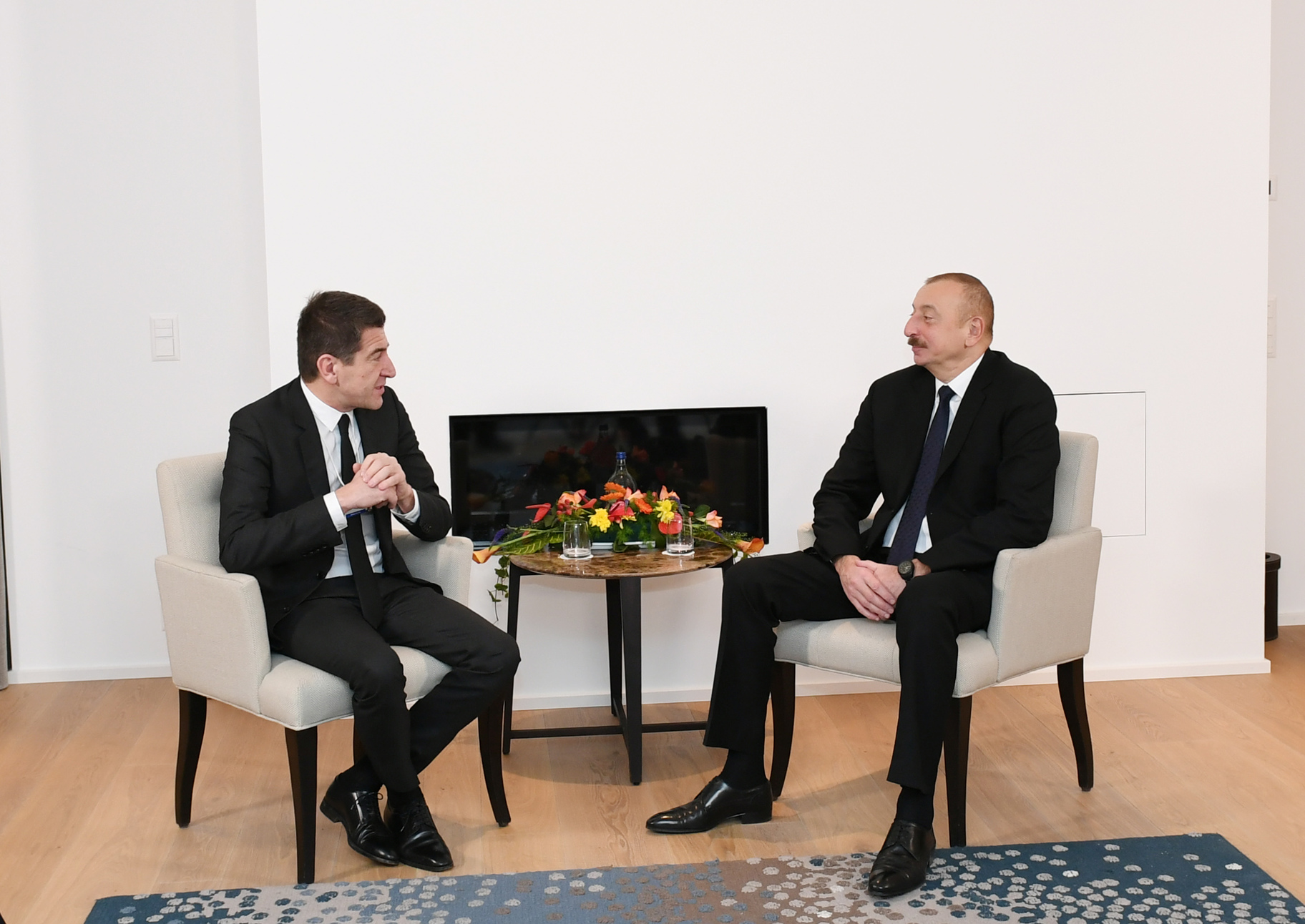
Pigasse meeting with Azerbaijan's President Ilham Aliyev in Davos, Switzerland

A long-time Socialist Party member, he distanced himself from François Hollande's policies in 2014 through his third book Éloge de l’anormalité, in which he criticizes the inability of the elites globally to address the crisis and the systematic use of austerity measures.

In May 2011, he organized a free concert in honor of the 30th anniversary of the election of President François Mitterrand.

== Personal life ==
He was married to Alix Etournaud, a journalist and writer, together they have three children. In 2011 she wrote an autofiction book about her husband's affair with the journalist Marie Drucker while she was pregnant with their third child.

In 2011, his wealth is estimated at several tens of millions of euros. While he did not own a house or car back in 2011, in 2018 it was confirmed that he was the owner of two houses, one in Boulogne-Billancourt and another one in Mesnuls.

Atypical in the banking landscape, Pigasse is a player of video games such as Mario Party, Mario Kart and Assassin’s Creed. He is also known to be a fan of punk rock.

== Bibliography ==
- Le Monde d'après, une crise sans précédent (with Gilles Finchelstein, Paris: Plon, 2009).
- Révolutions (Paris: Plon, 2012).
- Éloge de l’anormalité (Paris: Plon, 2014).
