= Mavoungou Zinga Mabio =

Congolese politician

Member of the National Assembly
- In office 2002–2007
- In office 2012–2017

Personal details
- Born: 29 August 1956 (age 69) Kondo-Sounga, Madingo-Kayes District, French Equatorial Africa
- Party: Alliance Party (Republic of the Congo) (Since 2020); Rally for Democracy and Social Progress (Until 2015)

Mavoungou Zinga Mabio (born 26 August 1956) is a Congolese politician and retired civil servant. He ran as candidate in the 2026 Republic of the Congo presidential election against long-term incumbent Denis Sassou Nguesso.

== Early life and professional career ==
Mabio was born in the Madingo-Kayes District near the port city of Pointe-Noire. After visiting school in Pointe-Noire, he studied private law at Marien Ngouabi University in Brazzaville, earning a master's degree.

He worked as a Customs officer until his retirement in 1998. His last position was regional head of the customs office in Pointe-Noire.

== Politics ==
After retirement Mavoungou Zinga Mabio joined the Rally for Democracy and Social Progress. He was elected to the National Assembly during the 2002 Republic of the Congo parliamentary election, as part of the United Democratic Forces coalition. The alliance became part of the governing coalition that supported president Sassou Nguesso. He lost his seat in the national assembly in the 2007 Republic of the Congo parliamentary election, when his party lost all but two seats, but was elected again in the 2012 Republic of the Congo parliamentary election as member of the National Assembly for Loandjili.

He became a vice-president of the Rally for Democracy and Social Progress in 2008. When the founder and leader of the party, Jean-Pierre Thystère Tchicaya died in 2008, Mabio succeeded him as party president in 2009. In 2015 Jean-Marc Thystère-Tchicaya took over control of the party and became part of the government, while Mabio co-founded the Initiative for Democracy in the Congo, that opposed the 2015 Republic of the Congo constitutional referendum that allowed president Sassou Nguesso to run for another presidential election.

After running unsuccessfully as an independent opposition candidate in the 2017 Republic of the Congo parliamentary election, Mabio founded the Alliance Party in 2020, with the goal of running in the 2021 Republic of the Congo presidential election, but retreated from the race. While most opposition politicians boycotted the 2026 Republic of the Congo presidential election, Mabio ran as candidate and received 1.48% of the votes, finishing in second after incumbent Denis Sassou Nguesso, who won the election with 94.82% of the vote.
