= 2018 in the Republic of the Congo =

- Decades: 1990s; 2000s; 2010s; 2020s
- See also: Other events of 2018; History of the Republic of the Congo

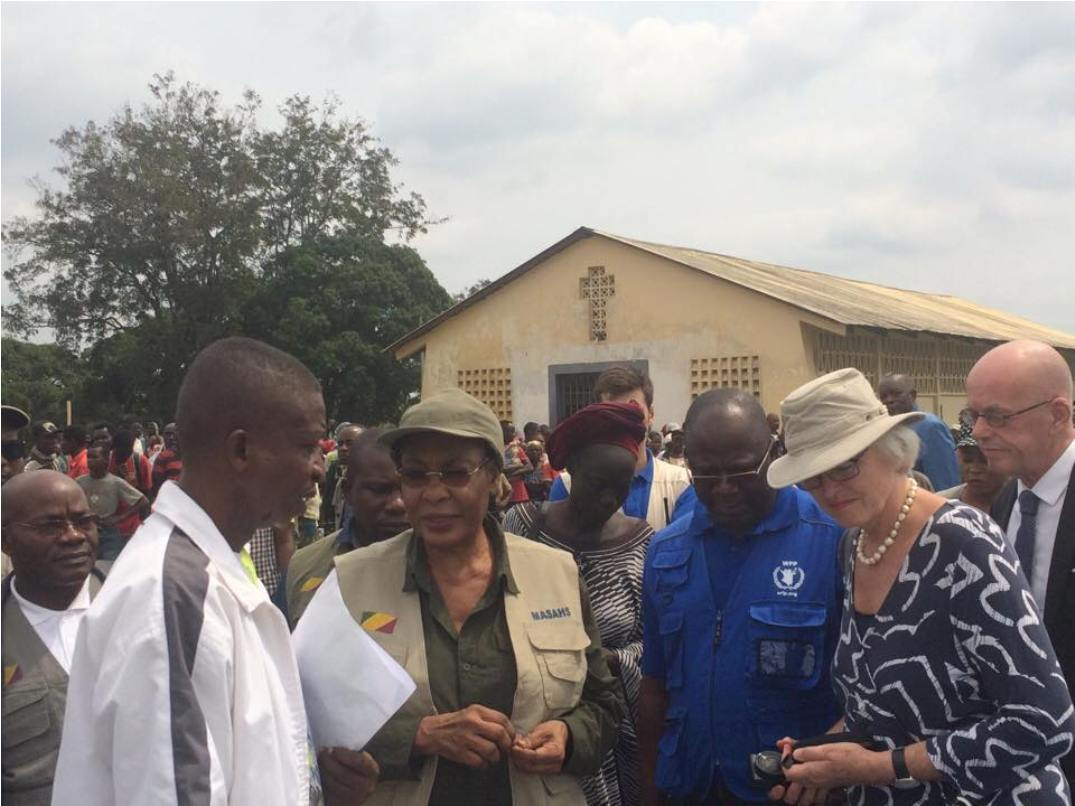

Events in the year 2018 in the Republic of the Congo.

== Incumbents ==
- President: Denis Sassou Nguesso

== Events ==
=== Sport ===
- 27 January – season start of the 2018 Ligue 1 (Congo)

== Deaths ==
- 3 June – Pierre-Ernest Abandzounou, academic and politician (b. 1940).
