= 1998 in the Republic of the Congo =

- Decades: 1970s; 1980s; 1990s; 2000s; 2010s
- See also: Other events of 1998; History of the Republic of the Congo

The following lists events that happened during 1998 in the Republic of the Congo.

== Events ==
=== May ===
- May 5 - Congolese leader, Denis Sassou Nguesso, visits Angola for the second time since he overthrew the former president with the help of Angolan troops.

=== November ===
- November 24 - Reports from the Republic of the Congo say that twelve people drowned in a Congolese river when a marine patrol boat tried to intercept a canoe in the Democratic Republic of the Congo. River traffic was suspended between the two countries for security reasons after the Second Congo War began.
