= Makosso IV =

17th King of Loango (1944–2020)

Moé Makosso IV

King of Loango
- In office 29 August 2009 – 23 December 2020
- Preceded by: King Tati Ier

Personal details
- Born: Jean Makosso; 1 May 1944 Tchizondi, French Congo
- Died: 23 December 2020 (aged 76) Rabat, Morocco

King Makosso IV (1 May 1944 – 23 December 2020) was the 17th King of Loango. He was crowned on 29 August 2009 in the Kouilou Department in the Republic of the Congo. He worked in Pointe-Noire as a mechanic, and was chosen to be the King of Loango because he was the nephew of King Poaty III.

He was inaugurated following the death of King Tati Ier in Diosso, and during his rule, he built a new royal palace in the city, called the Limani-Li-Bwali Diosso, located next to the Musée régional Mâ-Loango.

King Makosso died on 23 December 2020 in Rabat following a long illness. He was 76.

== Decorations ==
- Ordre Patriarcal de Saint Nicolas (2013)
