= Jean-Paul Pigasse =

French journalist (1939–2026)

- Born: 26 July 1939; Toulouse, France
- Died: 11 July 2026 (aged 86)
- Education: Institut d'études politiques de Toulouse
- Occupations: Journalist, media proprietor
- Relatives: Mathieu Pigasse (nephew)

Jean-Paul Pigasse (26 July 1939 – 11 July 2026) was a French journalist and media proprietor based in Brazzaville.

== Early life ==
Jean-Paul Pigasse was born in Toulouse, France on 26 July 1939.

== Career ==
Pigasse wrote under the pseudonym of 'Favilla' for Les Echos from 1978 to 1984. He is the author of five non-fiction books.

He was the owner of ADIAC, a communications firm which publishes the daily newspaper Les Dépêches de Brazzaville in the Republic of the Congo. He was friends with Congolese President Denis Sassou Nguesso.

In 2002, Tracfin realised that in 1999–2000, he had received 2.2 million Francs (around €340,000) from an offshore company called Socoil. Out of this sum, 1.2 million Francs were transferred to French businessman André Tarallo as a payback for a prior loan.

== Personal life and death ==
His wife was a cousin of French businessman Alfred Sirven. Pigasse lived in Brazzaville, Congo. He died on 11 July 2026, at the age of 86.

== Bibliography ==
- La difficulté d'informer : vérités sur la presse économique (Paris: Alain Moreau, 1975).
- Les sept portes du futur : des clés pour déchiffrer l'avenir (Paris: Albin Michel, 1981).
- Le bouclier d'Europe (Paris: Robert Laffont, 1992).
- La France et sa défense (with Jacques Baumel, Paris: Forgues, 1994).
- Congo, chronique d'une guerre annoncée : 5 juin-15 octobre 1997 (Paris: L'Harmattan, 1997).
- Le dossier noir de la presse française (Paris: Forgues, 1998).
