= Philippe Mvouo =

Congolese politician (1951–2026)

Minister of Energy
- In office 2002–2004

Minister of Posts and Telecommunications
- In office 2004–2006

Minister of Fisheries
- In office 2006–2007

Personal details
- Born: 14 September 1951 Kellé, French Congo, French Equatorial Africa
- Died: 18 February 2026 (aged 74) Orléans, France
- Party: PCT
- Occupation: Schoolteacher

Philippe Mvouo (14 September 1951 – 18 February 2026) was a Congolese politician of the Congolese Party of Labour (PCT).

Mvouo served as Minister of Energy from 2002 to 2004, Minister of Posts and Telecommunications from 2004 to 2006, and Minister of Fisheries from 2006 to 2007.

Mvouo died in Orléans on 18 February 2026, at the age of 74.
