= Agence d'Information d'Afrique Centrale =

News agency in the Republic of the Congo

The Agence d'Information d'Afrique Centrale (ADIAC) is a private news agency established in 1997 in the Republic of the Congo. ADIAC has headquarters in Brazzaville, and was run by Jean-Paul Pigasse until his death in 2026.

ADIAC publishes a newspaper, Les Dépêches de Brazzaville. Originally published monthly, as demand grew it was published at greater frequency. In 2007 it became the first daily newspaper in the Republic of the Congo. In 2017 ADIAC launched a second daily newspaper, Le Courrier de Kinshasa, in the Democratic Republic of the Congo.
