= Auguste Batina =

Congolese politician

Auguste Batina (28 March 1936 – 7 May 2017) was a Congolese politician. He served in the government of Congo-Brazzaville as Minister of Primary and Secondary Education from 1973 to 1975; later, he served in the Senate of Congo-Brazzaville from 2002 to 2011.

Batina worked as a primary school inspector, and in January 1971 he became Director of Primary and Normal Education at the Ministry of Primary and Secondary Education. President Marien Ngouabi subsequently appointed him to the government as Minister of Primary and Secondary Education on 30 August 1973. Batina served in that post for a little over a year; he was dismissed from the government in January 1975.

In July 2002, Batina was elected to the Senate as a candidate of the Congolese Labour Party (PCT) in Brazzaville. As of 2003, he was Secretary of the Collective of Brazzaville Senators. He was re-elected to the Senate in October 2005 as a PCT candidate in Brazzaville. Batina received 40 votes from the electors, placing sixth and thereby winning the last of the six seats available for Brazzaville. Following that election, Batina was designated as Secretary of the Senate's Education, Culture, Science and Technology, Health, Employment, and Social Affairs Commission on 11 October 2005.

In the October 2011 Senate election, Batina was not re-elected to the Senate. He died in Brazzaville on 7 May 2017.
