= Lassy Mbouity =

Congolese writer and politician (born 1988)

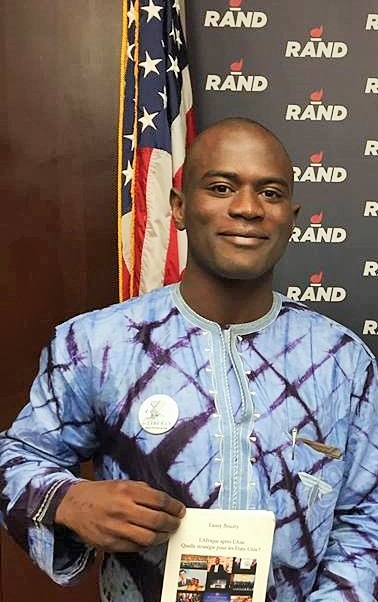
- Mbouity in 2015
- Born: Grace Herval Lassy Mbouity; 15 October 1988 (age 37); Brazzaville
- Education: Collège de la fraternité; Lycée Victor Augagneur; Complexe scolaire Clé de la réussite de Cotonou; Complexe scolaire Charles Montesquieu; École Africaine de développement; Marien Ngouabi University; Groupe des Écoles professionnelles de la marine marchande de Douala; Houston Community College; National Society of Leadership and Success
- Occupations: Writer, historian, journalist and politician
- Political party: Les Socialistes
- Website: www.lassymbouity.com

Lassy Mbouity (sometimes spelled Bouity), born October 15, 1988 in Brazzaville, is a writer, historian and politician. from the Republic of Congo.

He has been the president of the Congolese Socialists political party since 2024, director general of the newspaper and Editions Congo-Brazzaville Information, opponent of the regime of President Denis Sassou Nguesso. He is a declared candidate for the 2026 presidential election in Congo-Brazzaville.

Lassy Mbouity is also known for having written several books on the history of Africa, and of several African countries such as Congo, Gabon, Cameroon, Central African Republic, Democratic Republic of Congo, Senegal, Guinea, Ivory Coast and Mali.

From May 11 to May 20, 2025, Mbouity was abducted, tortured and even poisoned by armed men under the regime of President Denis Sassou Nguesso.

== Biography ==
=== Childhood and youth ===
Grace Herval Lassy Mbouity was born in the military hospital of Brazzaville on October 15, 1988. He is the second son of Simon Mbouity (1961-), colonel fighter pilot of the Congolese Armed Forces and Rachel Mbouity (1962-).

From 1998 to 1999, he passed his Certificate of Primary and Elementary Studies at the Poto-Poto Post School in Brazzaville

From 2000 to 2007, after studying in the 3rd year of secondary school during a long stay in the Democratic Republic of Congo, Lassy passed his Brevet d’Études du Premier Cycle (BEPC) at the Tchicaya college in Pointe-Noire, his second year of scientific studies at the Lycée Victor Augagneur, his Professional Aptitude Diploma in Computer Science within the Association of Professional Computer Scientists of the African Development School (EAD) based within the Loukabou paramedical school, his first literary Baccalaureate in West Africa at the “Clé de la réussite” higher college in Cotonou, Benin, and his second Scientific Baccalaureate at the Charles Montesquieu School Complex in downtown Pointe-Noire with a “Fairly Good” mention, as he was several times first and head of class.

After his two (2) Baccalaureates, Lassy Mbouity joined the Faculty of Economics at Marien University in Brazzaville.

From 2010 to 2011, Lassy was admitted at the international entrance exam for the Preparatory School for First Class Officers of the French Merchant Navy in Cameroon, where he obtained a Professional Swimming Certificate, but returned to Brazzaville, Congo, after not being selected to continue in France.

Upon his return to Brazzaville, He continued his graduate studies at the Faculty of Economics at Marien Ngouabi University, before enrolling at Houston Community College in the United States to study general literature, history, and political science. He did so with the financial support of his father and the assistance of his brother, Mbouity Mabiala, who had already settled in Houston, Texas, shortly before leaving Congo.

=== African youth leader in the United States ===
From 2012 to 2016, a humanities student at Houston Community College, young Lassy at the same time, he obtained two advanced diplomas in English (TOEFL and ESL), and a higher diploma in Personal Development from the National Society for Leadership and Success.

In 2015, he supported the candidacy of U.S. senator Rand Paul for the United States presidential election as president of Young Americans for Liberty (YAL), the youth wing of the American Republican Party in Houston, Texas, founded by Ron Paul, politician and former U.S. presidential candidate. Returning to Congo in 2017 after losing the financial support of his father, who had been relieved of his duties during the 2015 referendum to change the constitution, Lassy Mbouity was appointed head of the biweekly newspaper and publishing house Congo-Brazzaville Information.

As a leader of African youth, he trained several young Africans who benefited from his support to become writers and elected politicians in Côte d'Ivoire, the Republic of Congo, Cameroon, and the Democratic Republic of Congo.

Originally from the N'kondi royal family of the ancient Kingdom of Loango, Lassy Mbouity led the Association of Congolese Students (AEEC) in West Africa during his studies in Benin. He has published several books on the biography of President Denis Sassou-Nguesso, the current president of the Republic of Congo, and a book on his son, Denis Christel Sassou Nguesso.

In 2021, shortly before the publication of the book "Denis Sassou-Nguesso, the Guide to Sassouism," Lassy Mbouity, with the participation of several young people, decided to launch a social organization called the "Association of Sassouists" with the aim of promoting the culture and history of Congo through its great figures.

=== Political career ===
As an opposition politician in the regime of Denis Sassou Nguesso, president of the political party "The Socialists" and candidate for the 2026 presidential election in the Republic of Congo, Lassy Mbouity spent his last years fighting social injustices and bad governance in his country.

It is in this sense that he founded the political party "THE SOCIALISTS" to bring its members together around meaningful activities, with the aim of conquering and exercising power in the Republic of Congo, through its program based on socialism.

Lassy is deeply committed to defending human rights and the well-being of the Congolese people by leading activities aimed at raising awareness among the people and the government about social injustices, with the aim of improving living conditions and freeing populations suffering from poverty, as well as combating the regime of President Denis Sassou Nguesso, who has ruled our country for over 40 years amidst corruption, tribalism, nepotism, discrimination, famine, lack of access to healthcare, lack of access to housing, lack of education and employment, and human rights violations.

=== Death threats, assassination attempts, kidnapping, and torture ===
After founding the political party "The Socialists," Lassy organized several demonstrations to demand the resignation of President Denis Sassou Nguesso and announced his intention to run in the 2026 presidential election. These political activities were frowned upon by the leaders of the regime in power in Congo-Brazzaville, who saw him as an enemy and a man to be brought down.

As a result, Lassy Mbouity was the victim of poisoning, death threats and kidnapping, several assassination attempts, arrest and torture that resulted in a broken finger, attacks and closure of the headquarters of his newspaper and the Congo-Brazzaville Information publishing house, nighttime attacks on his residence, violence against his wife and children by armed men, death threats against his family, and an attempted rape of his wife.

Lassy Mbouity was arrested and wrongfully abducted by armed police officers in Brazzaville on Saturday, April 27, 2024, at around 11 a.m. at the Mazala roundabout in Moukondo, not far from his home located at 2 rue Milandou Cité des 17, and imprisoned without justification for four (04) days of detention until his release on Tuesday, April 30, 2024, at around 2 p.m., after being forced to stop denouncing social injustices and bad governance, to stop fighting and opposing the Denis Sassou Nguesso regime.

Lassy Mbouity decided and began to live with his family in hiding for security reasons. Having not renounced his ideas, he was sought and threatened with death daily by unknown and unidentified persons, who had already come to his home several times.

The Denis Sassou Nguesso regime wants to physically eliminate him because Lassy Mbouity is currently a Congolese opposition politician described as radical because of his highly critical remarks.

On the evening of April 30, 2025, about ten people tried to kill Lassy Mbouity when he came out of hiding to run errands. Lassy noticed that several people were following him after he left his home. Suddenly, several people started hitting him with sticks. When he noticed they had bladed weapons like knives and a machete, he fought them before he could run away.

He was seriously injured and suffered pain on his face, the back of his head, his right shoulder, his back, his left arm, and his left leg. He knew that Denis Sassou Nguesso's regime had sent people everywhere to look for him with the aim of physically eliminating him.

Lassy could no longer spend two (2) months in the same place. He was still in great pain, with a lot of shock and pain all over his body, when he received death and kidnapping threats by phone

On the morning of May 11, 2025, after filing a complaint with the Brazzaville High Court and preparing other international complaints with his spokesperson Martial Mbourangon Pa'nucci, Lassy Mbouity was dressing in the bedroom when five (5) armed men in civilian clothes and hooded entered his house to drag him to the living room naked in front of his wife and children, brutalized him, handcuffed him, bandaged his face before taking him into a black vehicle without a license plate. They told his wife that they had to interrogate him and that she had to remain calm.

They made several stops before driving for hours to a destination where Lassy was taken to a very quiet room. Until leaving this strange place, he did not hear the sound of a vehicle, human voices, birds, or even the sound of a mosquito or a fly. They tied him with ropes on a chair, still blindfolded, tortured him, broke his teeth, beat his testicles and abandoned him for days without eating.

It was some time before leaving this strange place that they stuck a syringe in his arm and buttocks while they tortured him, before asking him a few questions like why is he criticizing the Sassou Nguesso regime? He must know that he have undermined state security and wanted to overthrow the institutions. They forbade him from showing himself with opposition politicians, human rights organizations and members of my political party. Does he has weapons of war and how many activists did his political party, The Socialists, have? Is he supported by foreigners? They finally told him that this was my last warning if he wanted to live and asked him to never criticize the Denis Sassou Nguesso regime again, to leave the country in a week before putting him in a vehicle, driving for hours and abandoning him in the Madoukou river of poto-poto completely naked.

"It is thanks to two (2) young men who called my relatives to come and get me quickly that I am alive today," explained Lassy Mbouity in a special interview on the Renaissance TV channel R7.

After ten (10) days of confinement and torture, and thanks to a strong mobilization of the Congolese people and the diaspora, human rights organizations and the Congolese media, the opponent Lassy Mbouity was found abandoned naked in the Madoukou River in Poto-Poto, Brazzaville, but in critical condition before being rescued by two young Congolese men.

=== Personal life ===
Married and the father of three (3) children, Lassy Mbouity is fluent in several languages, including French and English.

=== Books ===
With more than 30 books published in French worldwide, Lassy Mbouity received an Honorary Award from the National Society for Leadership and Success (NSLS) in the United States in 2014.

Since 2014, he has been invited at the Political Book, Economic Book, Best Financial Article, and Best Political Article awards of Lire la Société in France.

- African Education Revolution
- Africa After Asia
- François Hollande Awakens African Youth
- History of the Republic of Congo
- History of the Democratic Republic of Congo
- History of the Republic of Chad
- Political Empowerment of African Youth
- History of the Republic Gabonese
- History of the Central African Republic
- History of the Republic of Guinea
- History of the Republic of Côte d'Ivoire
- History of the Republic of Mali
- History of the Republic of Senegal
- History of the Republic of Madagascar
- History of Africa
- Denis Sassou Nguesso, my policy for the Congo
- The fight against corruption and conflicts of interest in Africa
- WorldCat
- The Library of Congress
- Fichier d'autorité international virtuel
- International Standard Name Identifie
- Bibliothèque nationale de France
