= 2024 in the Republic of the Congo =

- Decades: 2000s; 2010s; 2020s
- See also: Other events of 2024; History of the Republic of the Congo

Events in the year 2024 in the Republic of the Congo.

== Incumbents ==
- President: Denis Sassou Nguesso
- Prime Minister: Anatole Collinet Makosso
- Cabinet: Anatole Collinet Makosso's government

== Events ==
- 13 March - The Ministry of Health announces the arrival of mpox in the country, with 43 cases reported in nine out of 12 departments.
- 19 May - Several people are injured after a shell fired from neighboring Kinshasa during the 2024 Democratic Republic of the Congo coup attempt flies across the Congo River and lands on a neighborhood of Brazzaville.

== Holidays ==
- 1 January - New Year's Day
- 1 April - Easter Monday
- 1 May - Labour Day
- 9 May - Ascension Day
- 20 May - Whit Monday
- 10 June - Reconciliation Day
- 15 August – National day
- 1 November – All Saints' Day
- 28 November – Republic Day
- 25 December – Christmas Day

== Deaths ==
- 24 October – Alphonse Poaty-Souchlaty, 83, politician, prime minister (1989–1990)

== See also ==
- African Continental Free Trade Area
