= COVID-19 pandemic in the Republic of the Congo =

Ongoing COVID-19 viral pandemic in the Republic of the Congo

- Disease: COVID-19
- Pathogen: SARS-CoV-2
- Location: Republic of the Congo
- First outbreak: Wuhan, Hubei, China
- Index case: Brazzaville
- Arrival date: 14 March 2020 (6 years, 5 months, 1 week and 1 day)
- Confirmed cases: 25,234 (updated 5 August 2026)
- Deaths: 389 (updated 5 August 2026)

The COVID-19 pandemic in the Republic of the Congo was a part of the worldwide pandemic of coronavirus disease 2019 (COVID-19) caused by severe acute respiratory syndrome coronavirus 2 (SARS-CoV-2). The virus was confirmed to have reached the Republic of the Congo in March 2020.

== Background ==
On 12 January 2020, the World Health Organization (WHO) confirmed that a novel coronavirus was the cause of a respiratory illness in a cluster of people in Wuhan, Hubei, China, which was reported to the WHO on 31 December 2019.

The case fatality ratio for COVID-19 has been much lower than SARS of 2003, but the transmission has been significantly greater, with a significant total death toll.

== Timeline ==
=== March 2020 ===
- The country's first case was announced on 14 March, a 50-year-old man who returned to the Republic of the Congo from Paris, France. Two more cases were detected on 19 March. As of 31 March, there were 19 cases in the Republic of the Congo.
- The country reported its first two deaths on 31 March, both of which in Pointe-Noire.

=== April to December 2020 ===
- There were 201 new cases in April, 384 in May, 725 in June, 2047 in July, 1252 in August, 461 in September, 201 in October, 484 in November, and 1333 in December. The total number of cases stood at 220 in April, 604 in May, 1329 in June, 3376 in July, 4628 in August, 5089 in September, 5290 in October, 5774 in November, and 7107 in December.
- The number of recovered patients was 19 in April, 172 in May, 694 in June, 1003 in July, 3995 in September, 4988 in November, and 5846 in December, leaving 192 active cases at the end of April, 412 at the end of May, 594 at the end of June, 2317 at the end of July, 2159 at the end of August, 692 at the end of November, and 1153 at the end of December.
- The death toll rose to 9 in April, 20 in May, 41 in June, 56 in July, 92 in October, 94 in November, and 108 in December.

=== January to December 2021 ===
- Vaccination started on 19 April, initially with 300,000 doses of the Sinopharm BIBP vaccine donated by China and 12,000 doses of Sputnik V. By the end of the month 41379 persons had received their first inoculation and 11700 had been fully vaccinated.
- There were 780 new cases in January, 933 in February, 861 in March, 997 in April, 980 in May, 935 in June, 590 in July, 402 in August, 656 in September, 3426 in October, 1300 in November, and 2307 in December. The total number of cases stood at 7,887 in January, 8,820 in February, 9,681 in March, 10,678 in April, 11,658 in May, 12,596 in June, 13,186 in July, 13,588 in August, 14,244 in September, 17,670 in October, 18,970 in November, and 21,277 in December.
- The number of recovered patients was 5,846 in January, 7,019 in February, 7,898 in March, 8,208 in April and May, 11,211 in June, and 12,421 in July, leaving 1,924 active cases at the end of January, 1,673 at the end of February, 1,648 at the end of March, 2,326 at the end of April, 3,297 at the end of May, 1,220 at the end of June, 587 at the end of July, 984 at the end of August, 1,630 at the end of September, 4,644 at the end of October, 1,763 at the end of November, and 2,083 at the end of December.
- The death toll rose to 117 in January, 128 in February, 135 in March, 144 in April, 153 in May, 165 in June, 178 in July, 183 in August, 193 in September, 278 in October, 354 in November, and 369 in December.
- Modeling by WHO’s Regional Office for Africa suggests that due to under-reporting, the true cumulative number of infections by the end of 2021 was around 2.5 million while the true number of COVID-19 deaths was around 1560.

=== January to December 2022 ===
- There were 2428 new cases in January, 315 in February, 51 in March, 32 in April, 11 in May, 76 in June, 585 in July, and 62 in August. The total number of cases stood at 23,705 in January, 24,020 in February, 24,071 in March, 24,103 in April, 24,114 in May, 24,190 in June, 24,775 in July, and 24,837 in August.
- There were 3,156 active cases at the end of January, 3,464 at the end of February, 3,508 at the end of March, and 161 at the end of June.
- The death toll rose to 371 in January, 378 in February, 385 in March, and 386 in July.

=== 2023 ===
- There were 376 confirmed cases in 2023, bringing the total number of cases to 25,213. Three patients died in 2023, bringing the total death toll to 389.

== Cultural impact ==
Artist Sardoine Mia created a new body of work partly in response to the pandemic; it was exhibited in Brazzaville in 2021.

== See also ==
- COVID-19 pandemic in Africa
- COVID-19 pandemic by country and territory
