= History of the Republic of the Congo =

The history of the Republic of the Congo has been marked by diverse civilisations: Indigenous, French and post-independence.

== Bantus and Forest Peoples ==
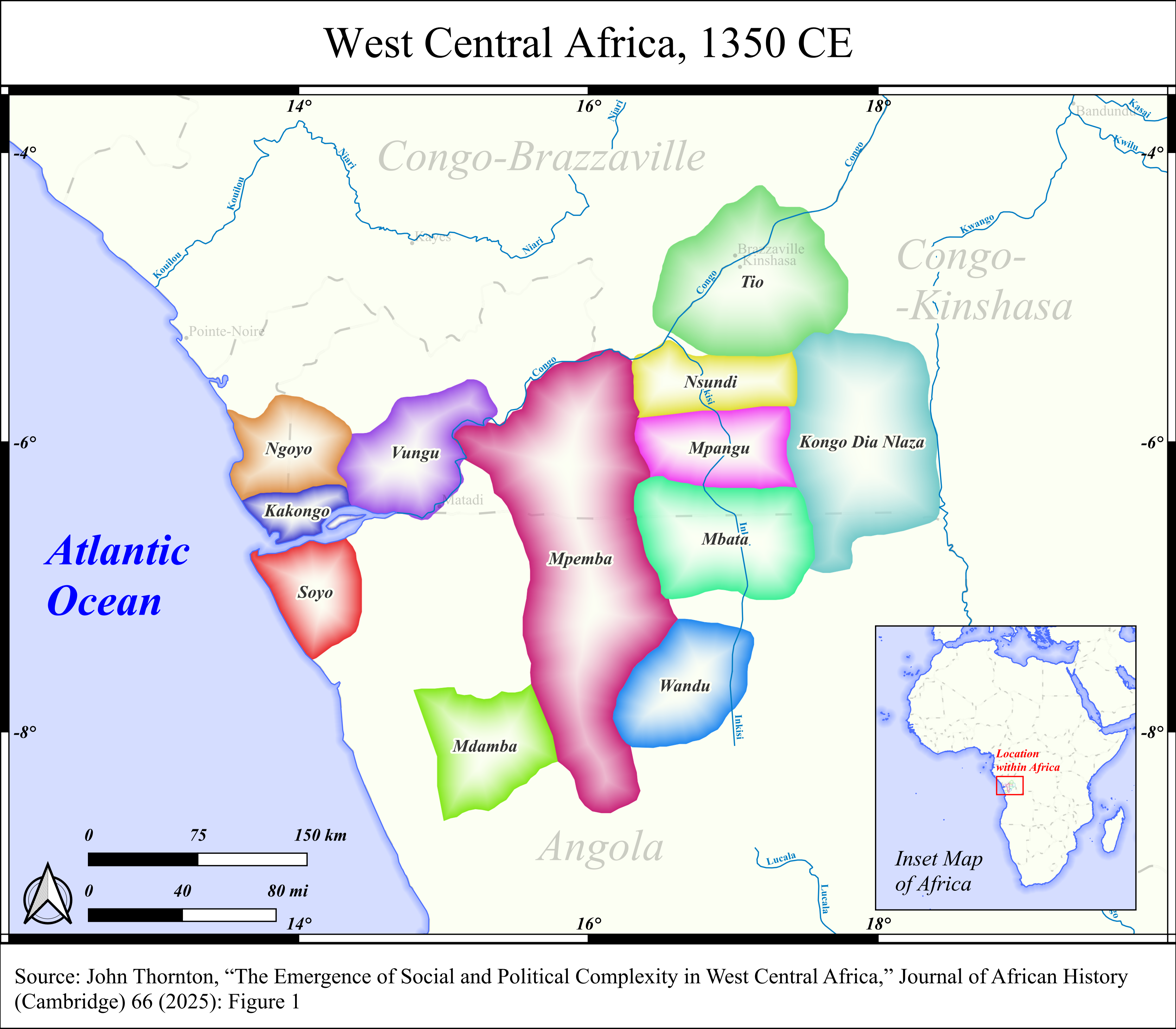
States of the western Congo Basin, c. 1350

The earliest inhabitants of the region comprising present-day Congo were the Forest peoples whose Stone Age culture was slowly replaced by Bantu tribes. The main Bantu tribe living in the region were the Kongo, also known as Bakongo, who established mostly unstable kingdoms along the mouth, north and south, of the Congo River. The capital of this Kongolese kingdom, Mbanza Kongo, later baptized as São Salvador by the Portuguese, is a town in northern Angola near the border with the DRC.

From the capital they ruled over an empire encompassing large parts of present-day Angola, the Republic of the Congo and the Democratic Republic of the Congo. They ruled over nearby tributary states, often by appointing sons of the Kongo kings to head these states. It had six 'so-called' provinces called Mpemba, Soyo, Mbamba, Mbata, Nsundi and Mpangu. With the Kingdom of Loango in the north and the Kingdom of Mbundu in the south being tributary states. In the East it bordered on the Kwango river, a tributary of the Congo River. In total the kingdom is said to have had 3 to 4 million inhabitants and a surface of about 300,000 km^{2}. According to oral traditions it was established in around 1400 when King Lukeni lua Nimi conquered the kingdom of Kabunga and established Mbanza Kongo as its capital.

== Portuguese exploration ==
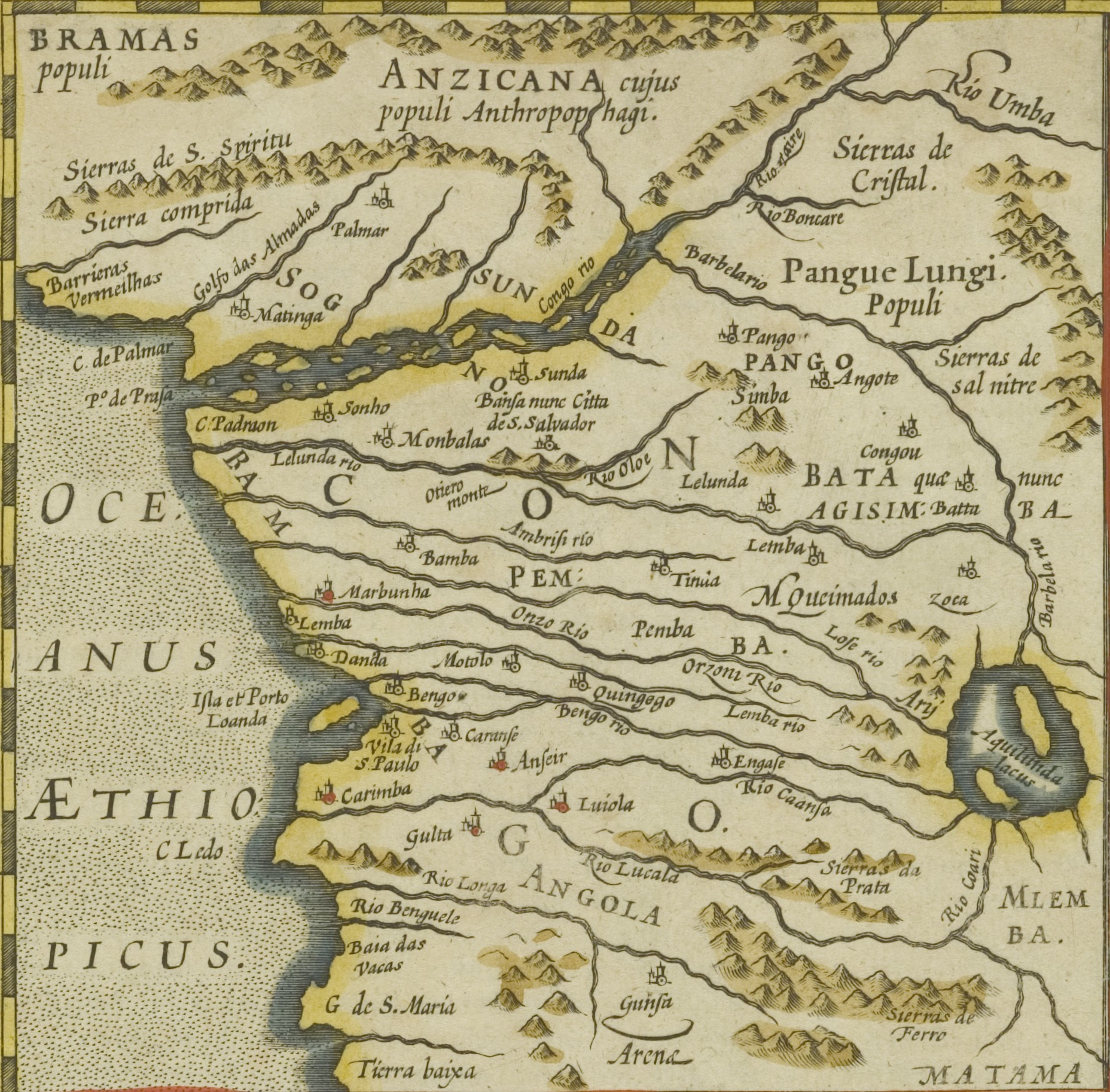
The Kongo region at the time of first European contact

This African Iron Age culture came under great pressure with the arrival of the first Europeans, in this case Portuguese explorers. King John II of Portugal sought, in order to break Venetian and Ottoman control over trade with the East, to organize a series of expeditions south along the African coast with the goal of establishing direct contact with Asia. In 1482–1483, Captain Diogo Cão, sailing southwards on the uncharted Congo River, discovered the mouth of the river, and became the first European to encounter the Kingdom of Kongo.

Initially relations were limited and considered beneficial to both sides. With Christianity easily accepted by the local nobility, leading on 3 May 1491 to the baptism of king Nzinga a Nkuwu as the first Christian Kongolese king João I. He was succeeded after his death in 1506 by his son Nzinga Mbemba, who ruled as King Afonso I until 1543. Under his reign Christianity gained a strong foothold in the country. Many churches were built in Mbanza, of which the Kulumbimbi Cathedral (erected between 1491 and 1534) was the most impressive. In theory the kings of Portugal and Kongo were equals and they exchanged letters as such. Kongo at some point even established diplomatic relations with the Vatican, and the Pope appointed a local priest as bishop for the region.

== Revolts ==
The result was a series of revolts against Portuguese rule of which the battle of Mbwila and the revolt led by Kimpa Vita (Tchimpa Vita) were the most important. The battle of Mbwila (or battle of Ambouilla or battle of Ulanga) was the result of a conflict between the Portuguese, led by governor André Vidal de Negreiros, and the Kongolese king António I concerning mining rights. The Kongolese refused to give the Portuguese extra territorial rights and the Portuguese were angry because of Kongolese support for previous Dutch invasions of the region. During a battle on 25 October 1665 an estimated 20,000 Kongolese fought against the Portuguese, who won the battle thanks to the early death in battle of Kongolese King Afonso I of Kongo.

The revolt of Kimpa Vita was another attempt to regain independence from the Portuguese. Baptised around 1684 as Dona Béatrice, Kimpa Vita was raised Catholic and being very pious she became a nun seeing visions of St. Anthony of Padua ordering her to restore the kingdom of Kongo to its former glory. Creating the Anthonian prophetic movement she interfered directly in the then civil war between the three members of the local nobility claiming the Kongolese throne, João II, Pedro IV and Pedro Kibenga. In it she took sides against Pedro IV, considered the favorite of the Portuguese. Her revolt, during which she captured the capital Mbanza Kongo, was short lived. She was captured by the forces of Pedro IV and under orders of Portuguese Capuchin Friars condemned for being a witch and a heretic and consequently burned to death. For many, she is the African version of Joan of Arc and an early symbol of African resistance against colonialism because, for her outspokenness, she was burned alive on a pyre.

== Congo's disintegration ==
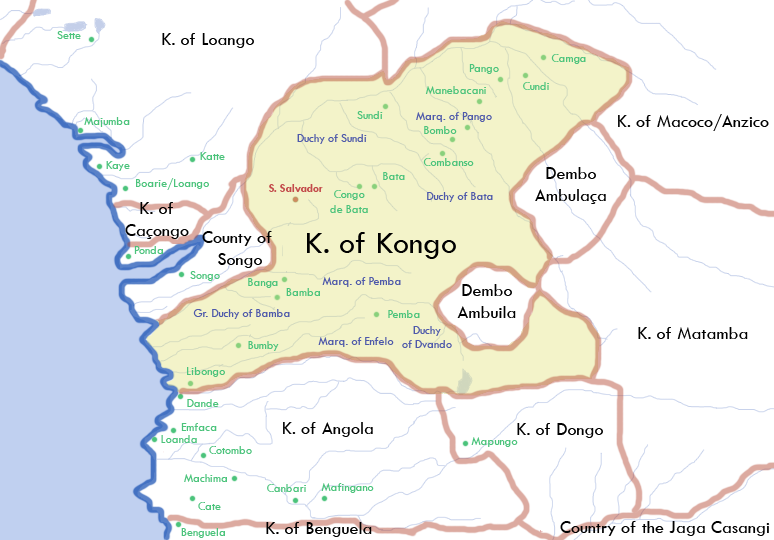
The Kongo Kingdom c. 1700

As a result of all these wars the kingdom of the Loango in the north gained independence from Kongo. Also new kingdoms came to existence of which the Téké was the most important, ruling over a large area encompassing present-day Brazzaville and Kinshasa. Portugal's position in Europe suffered a major change in 1580 when the Kingdoms of Spain and Portugal were united by a personal union under King Philip, creating the Iberian Union which lasted until 1640. This resulted in a diminished role for Portugal in African affairs, including the area around the mouth of the Congo River. The Kingdom of Kongo was reduced to a small enclave in the north of Angola with King Pedro V in 1888 finally accepting to become a vassal of the Portuguese. The Portuguese abolished the kingdom after the revolt of the Kongolese in 1914.

== French rule ==
=== Scramble for raw materials ===
The period leading up to the Berlin Conference on Africa saw a rush by the major European powers to increase their control of the African continent. The rise in Western Europe of capitalism and the consequent industrialization led to a fast-growing demand for African raw materials like rubber, palm oil and cotton. Those who had these raw materials could have their economy grow strong. Others would lose out. This resulted in a new and more intensified scramble for Africa.

The Congo River hereby was a prime target for this new conquest by the European nations. Here the French, the Belgian King Leopold II and the Portuguese, in close cooperation with the British, fought for control of this area. Resulting in the division of the mouth of the Congo River between Portugal, who obtained Cabinda, an enclave north of the Congo River situated on the Atlantic Coast, the French who seized the large area north of the River, and king Leopold II gaining only a small foothold at the mouth of the Congo River but obtaining the huge hinterland, the present-day Democratic Republic of the Congo (formerly Zaïre). Hereby Leopold II obtained control via his International African Society and later the International Congolese Society, so-called philanthropic organizations who hired the British explorer Henry Morton Stanley to establish its authority. This resulted in the creation of the Congo Free State, the private empire of Leopold II. On November 15, 1908, the Belgian parliament annexed the colony, the reign of Leopold II over the Congo being discredited.

=== Pierre Savorgnan de Brazza ===
On the north bank of the river arrived the French explorer Pierre Savorgnan de Brazza, born in the Italian city of Rome in 1852. As a French naval officer he refused to work for the International African Society and instead helped the French in their conquest of the area north of the Congo River. Traveling from the Atlantic Ocean coast in present-day Gabon via the rivers Ogooué and Lefini he arrived in 1880 in the kingdom of the Téké where on 10 September 1880 he signed the treaty with King Makoko establishing French control over the region and making his capital soon afterwards at the small village named Mfoa later to be called Brazzaville.

=== Establishing control ===
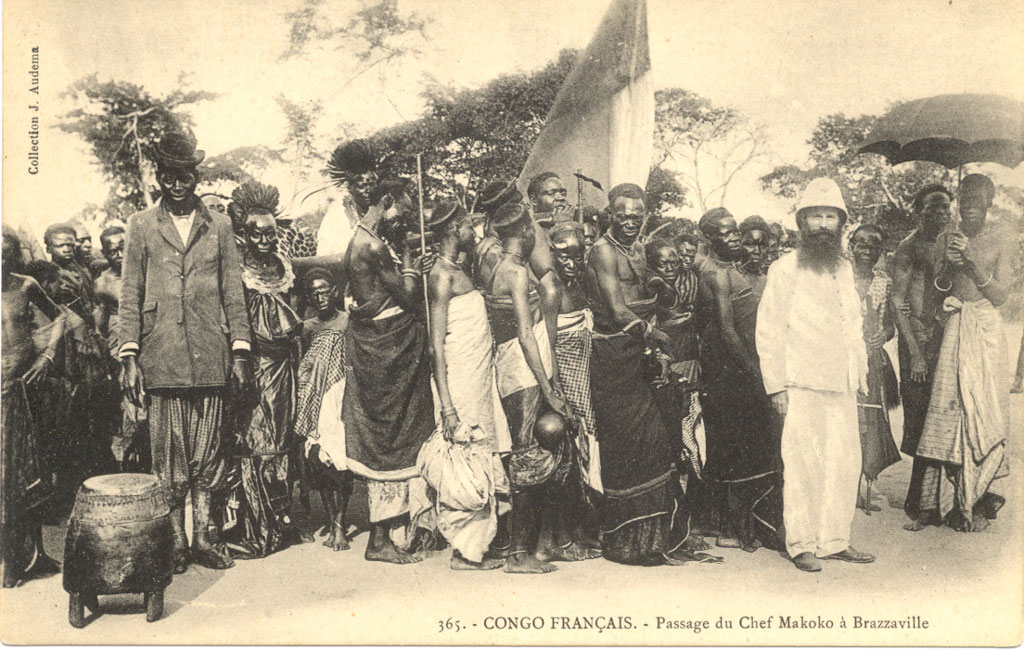
King Makoko of Téké (center left carried on chair) in procession to Brazzaville with French colonials, circa 1905.

Establishing French control was difficult. Belgian King Leopold II also tried to gain a foothold on the northern bank of the Congo River and sent Stanley to the area around Brazzaville. Following this was a series of revolts against the French of which the Bahangala Revolt led by Mabiala Ma Nganga was the first important one. It started in 1892 with the murder of the French administrator Laval and ended with the killing by the French of its leader in 1896. Many of the revolts were the result of French policy of maltreating the local population through the use of harsh forced labor. The locals were governed through the use of the repressive Code de l'indigénat Act. A law, which introduced forced labor, made it illegal for the local population to publicly air its grievances and excluded them from all the important jobs.

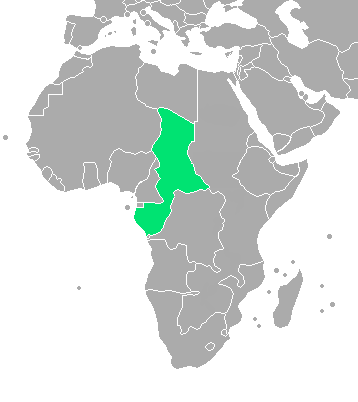
The extent of French Equatorial Africa circa 1910. (Cameroon was still a German colony at this time.)

The French government allowed for the establishment of the so-called Concessionary Companies in 1889 so as to circumvent the economic non-discrimination provisions of the Treaty of Berlin and maximize the revenue drawn from underpopulated and undeveloped regions under their control. Roughly forty companies with a capital of roughly 59.5 million francs were given a free hand to exploit the colony's resources under virtual monopoly conditions. 650,000 square miles of land, except for a few strategic locations mainly around the Congo River, were leased as concessions for a thirty-year period. Cost-benefit considerations reigned supreme as often undercapitalized companies employed unqualified personnel and/or adventurers who lived off the land while stripping their concessions of all possible riches. Ivory and rubber virtually disappeared from the concessionary areas; indigenous populations were decimated by brutal forced labor, disease, and maladministration, and some fled to neighboring colonies.

French rule was brutal and led to many thousands of deaths. The construction between 1921 and 1934 of the 511 km long railway, the Chemin de Fer Congo-Océan between Brazzaville and Pointe-Noire is for example said to have cost the lives of around 23,000 locals and a few hundred Europeans. Any resistance against French colonial rule, however small, was brutally repressed. Ultimately the French government lost more money than it gained in rents and taxes from the Concessionary system upon which the colony had become reliant, and French public opinion was shocked by reports of the wide-scale brutalities which the system had given rise to. By 1930 most of the Concessionary companies had gone bankrupt and the practice had largely ceased.

In 1911 parts of the colony (the so-called New Cameroon territories) were ceded to the German Empire in exchange for German recognition of France's rights to Morocco. German rule in these regions lasted only five years, and ultimately the New Cameroon territories were seized back by France in 1916, after the fall of German forces in Kamerun.

=== French administration ===
The first name given officially on 1 August 1886 for the new colony was Colony of Gabon and Congo. On 30 April 1891 this was renamed Colony of French Congo, consisting of Gabon and Middle Congo, the name the French gave to Congo-Brazzaville at that time. On 15 January 1910 the colony again was renamed to French Equatorial Africa (Afrique Equatoriale Française or AEF), this time it also included Chad and Oubangui-Chari, nowadays the Central African Republic. Congo-Brazzaville gained autonomy on the November 28, 1958 and independence from France on the August 15, 1960. The capital of the AEF was Brazzaville, for Middle Congo the capital was Pointe Noire.

The Federation quickly became centered on Middle Congo due to the presence of the Governor-General in Brazzaville, so while each colony was theoretically fairly autonomous the centralization of powers meant that the Governor-General gave preferential treatment to the region in which he resided. Education, health services, judicial systems, and public works were all under the control of Brazzaville-based authorities who could overrule the territorial governors. Middle Congo was provided with the only deep-water port in the Federation at Pointe Noire as well as the railway. Brazzaville's public buildings, schools, law courts, trading firms, telecommunications and medical services soon surpassed by far their counterparts elsewhere in the Federation. Peoples from more marginal areas of AEF such as Chad were forced to work in Middle Congo, and funds were funneled primarily into the region, causing a great sense of resentment. Ultimately the massive expansion of Middle Congo's civil service contributed to a drain of the rural population into the cities, and created an entrenched bureaucracy and trade union network that would prove to be a burden on state stability following independence.

The French government continued to rule through a Governor-General until the elections of 1957 when a High Commissioner of the République was established. The total population in 1950 for the whole AEF was 4,143,922, with only around 15,000 non-Africans present.

== 1940s and Reforms ==
=== World War II ===
As with the arrival of the Portuguese events in Europe again had a deep impact on the affairs of Congo-Brazzaville, and Africa in general. Marshal Philippe Pétain surrendered to Germany on 22 June 1940, and this gave birth to the so-called Vichy France republic. Pétain had earlier refused to continue the war against Germany from African territory alongside Great Britain. With the help of a handful of local French administrators and officers, the British, and the Belgian government in exile Charles de Gaulle's Free French won over large parts of the French Empire. Politicians such as René Pleven, who later became prime minister, and officers as General Philippe Leclerc de Hauteclocque, Lieutenant René Amiot, Captain Raymond Delange, Colonel Edgar De Larminat and Adolphe Sicé helped him to gain control of the AEF territory. In three days troops loyal to De Gaulle took control of Chad (26 August 1940), Cameroon (27 August) and of Middle Congo (the 28th of August). Brazzaville hereby became the capital of the so-called Free French in Africa, ruled in theory by a Conseil de défense de l'Empire set up by De Gaulle on 27 October 1940. The FEA centred on Middle Congo went overnight from a backwater to a linchpin of Free French forces in Africa. Point Noire in particular became a vital transit area and base for bringing supplies, soldiers and labor from the interior to the coast and back again. The intense use of the railway led to the rise of a new urban labor class and improved the infrastructure of the colony.

=== Felix Eboué ===
In this revolt the then-governor of Chad Félix Eboué played a key role. Because of this and his earlier support for De Gaulle he became Governor-General of the Afrique Equatoriale Française (AEF) in 1940, the first non-white to achieve this position in French colonial history. Born in 1884 in French Guiana this descendant of African slaves was a key figure together with René Pleven in the organization by the De Gaulle government of the Brazzaville Conference of 1944, which took place between January 30 and February 8, 1944 and which set out the new direction of French colonial policies after World War II. Many of these were policies already put forward by Eboué in his 1941 book entitled "La nouvelle politique coloniale de l'A.E.F." This conference led to the abolition of forced labor and the code de l'indigénat, which had made the political and social activities of the indigenous people illegal. This in turn led to the new French constitution of the Fourth Republic approved on 27 October 1946 and the election of the first Equatorial African members of Parliament in Paris. For Eboué and the new French government the people in the colonies were officially part of the French empire and had a new series of rights, including freedom of association, a uniform code of law, and elective institutions at three levels. A severely weakened France, under pressure from the US, had hardly any option but to change its colonial policies.

=== Rise of nationalism ===
Governor General Felix Eboué had a carrot and stick approach to local Congolese grievances. While allowing certain freedoms he brutally repressed any activities deemed dangerous to French colonial control. The case of the Congolese trade unionist André Matsoua (Matswa) shows his tough approach to political dissent.

André Matsoua can be seen as the father of modern Congolese nationalism. His rise shows how, in spite of the Code de l'Indigénat and the brutal repression, Africans in French colonies were able to set up resistance movements to colonial rule. Local schools run by French missionaries, as elsewhere in Africa formed the basis of this rise of African nationalism. André Matsoua got his education and contacts with European thinking through the church. Born in 1899 in Mandzakala he joined the French customs administration in Brazzaville in 1919 and soon after left for France where he joined the French army to fight in Morocco. He returned home as a non-commissioned officer. In 1926 he in Paris formed the Association des Originaires de l'A.E.F. with the purpose of helping people from his region living in France. For this he got support from some sections of French society as the French Communist Party and elements within the Free Masonry movement.

When in 1929 his group also became active in Congo itself and demanded an end to the Code de l'Indigénat, things changed. In 1929 the French dissolved Matsoua's association and he together with some of his friends were jailed and sent in exile to Chad, leading to riots and a campaign of disobedience against the French administration lasting many years. He however escaped to France in 1935 where under a new identity he continued his political work. Showing his loyalty to France, in spite of the harsh repression, he joined the French army to fighting the German invasion in 1940. Wounded, he was rearrested, and sent back to Brazzaville where on 8 February 1941 he was sentenced under Felix Eboué to work in labor camps for the rest of his life. He died under unclear circumstances in prison on 13 January 1942. His supporters maintain that he was murdered, and began the Matsouanist movement, active chiefly among the Lari, even after independence.

== Road to independence ==
Republic of the Congo: République du Congo (French); Republíki ya Kongó (Lingala); Repubilika ya Kôngo (Kituba)
- 1959–1970
- Flag Coat of arms
- Motto: "Unité, Travail, Progrès" (French) (English: "Unity, Work, Progress")
- Anthem: "La Congolaise" (French); Besi Kôngo (Kongo) (English: "The Congolese")
- History
  - Established: 1959
  - Disestablished: 1970
Preceded by	Succeeded by
French Congo	People's Republic of the Congo

The Congo went in the space of fourteen years from having no political freedom whatsoever to complete independence, making the rise of legitimate democratic institutions respected by a substantial proportion of the population near-impossible. Original democratic institutions were modeled on those of France, but multiple Africanising constitutions were instituted and then set aside in 1961, 1963, 1968, 1973 and 1992. As a heterogeneous state, political parties very quickly began to focus solely on ethnic and regionalist groupings. For example, between 1946 and 1956 the Lari, an important community in the country, refused to take part in elections, with many under the belief that their deceased messianic leader André Matsoua would return. The absence of the Bakongo from early politics led to a power vacuum into which the Vili and Mbochi moved until independence.

The most prominent Congolese politician until 1956 was Jean-Félix Tchicaya, born in Libreville on 9 November 1903 and a member of the royal family of the Kingdom of Loango. Together with Ivorian leader Félix Houphouët-Boigny and others, he formed the Rassemblement Démocratique Africain (RDA) in 1946 and, in 1947, the Parti Progressiste Africain. On 21 November 1945, Tchicaya became one of the first African leaders elected to the French parliament, giving him great prestige in his native country.

Although Tchicaya was on the left of the French political spectrum, he never strongly questioned French colonial rule. This resulted in a loss of influence as the Congo prepared for independence, influenced by nationalist anti-colonial leaders as Kwame Nkrumah from Ghana and Egyptian President Gamel Abdel Nasser. Only by aligning himself with his erstwhile enemy, the more radical Jacques Opangault in the parliamentary elections of March 31, 1957 could he continue to play a leading role in Congolese political life.

Prior to independence, the French establishment and Catholic Church feared Opangault's radicalism and favored the rise of Fulbert Youlou, a former priest. The defection of Georges Yambot from the African Socialist Movement (MSA) to Youlou's Union Démocratique pour la Défense d'Intérêts Africains (UDDIA) helped Youlou become prime minister in 1958. This led to the establishment of the Republic of the Congo on 28 November 1958 (with Brazzaville replacing Point Noire as the country's capital).

On 16 February 1959, a revolt organized by Opangault and his MSA erupted in clashes along tribal lines between Southerners, supporting Youlou, and people from the North, loyal to the MSA. The riots were suppressed by French army and Opangault was arrested. In total about 200 people died. Prime Minister Youlou then held the elections for which Opangault had previously asked in vain. After the May 9 arrest of several politicians, including veteran politician Simon Kikhounga Ngot, because of an alleged communist plot, parliamentary elections were convincingly won by Youlou. On 12 July 1960 France agreed to Congo becoming fully independent. On 15 August 1960, the Republic of the Congo became an independent country and Fulbert Youlou became its first President.

In November that year, Youlou released Opangault, Ngot and other adversaries, as part of an amnesty. In return both politicians, as well as Germain Bicoumat, joined Youlou's government and received ministerial posts, effectively destroying any organized political opposition.

=== Oil ===
Shortly before gaining independence an event occurred that in the years to come would have deep influence on the country and its relations with the outside world, mainly France. Although French geologists had already established for certain in 1926 the presence of oil and gas in the country, in 1957 near Pointe Indienne the French Societé des Pétroles de l'Afrique Equatoriale Françaises (SPAEF) found oil and gas reserves offshore in sufficient exploitable quantities. Only then did France start exploiting these reserves. The reason was that in Algeria a war of independence was fought, and the French were losing. Until then Algeria was the main source of oil and gas destined for the French market. To remain independent of the American and British oil majors France had to look elsewhere for its supply. For some the discovery of oil off the Congolese coast was a blessing. For the majority of the local population it rather proved to be a curse as the International Monetary Fund in its yearly reports on the country a few years ago sadly observed. By the 1970s oil was Congo's largest export, however global market-price vicissitudes together with Congo's tendency to rely on overly optimistic projections of future revenues for the political purposes of sustaining a large civil service and a highly inefficient State sector, have regularly caused serious fiscal imbalances. Development of the sector has been hampered by the nation's traditionally powerful trade unionist movement, political uncertainties, as well as the costs of exploitation in a country with poor transport infrastructure.

== Les Trois Glorieuses and the 1968 Coup d'état ==
As Brazzaville had been the capital of the large federation of French Equatorial Africa, it had an important workforce and many trade unions. Further radicalization elsewhere in Africa as a result of the decolonization led to revolt against the dictatorial rule of Youlou. Following Youlou's 6 August 1963 announcement of the formation of a one-party state with only one legal trade union, trade unions started their revolt on 13 August. Youlou's palace was besieged in August by angry workers and the French refused to intervene militarily, and he was forced to resign. This uprising is known as Les Trois Glorieuses (the Three Glorious Days), named after the French July Revolution against King Charles X in 1830. Fulbert Youlou and his main supporters were arrested by the military and ceased to play any further role in Congolese political life.

The Congolese military took charge of the country briefly and installed a civilian provisional government headed by Alphonse Massamba-Débat. Under the 1963 constitution, Massamba-Débat was elected president for a five-year term and named Pascal Lissouba to serve as prime minister.

President Massamba-Débat's term in office was characterized by a shift to the political left which included nationalizations and increased political ties to the USSR and communist China. Massamba-Débat's government ended in August 1968 when Captain Marien Ngouabi and other army officers toppled the government in a bloodless coup. After a period of consolidation under the newly formed National Revolutionary Council, Ngouabi assumed the presidency on December 31, 1968. One year later, President Ngouabi proclaimed the People's Republic of the Congo, Africa's first People's Republic and announced the decision of the National Revolutionary Movement to change its name to the Congolese Party of Labour (PCT).

== Assassination of Ngouabi and election of Sassou-Nguesso ==
On March 18, 1977, President Ngouabi was assassinated. A number of people were accused of shooting Ngouabi were tried and some of them executed, including former President Alphonse Massemba-Débat and a fisherman, Chanrithy Moukoko, but there was little evidence to prove their involvement, and the motive behind the assassination remains unclear.

An 11-member Military Committee of the Party (CMP) was named to head an interim government with Col. (later Gen.) Joachim Yhombi-Opango to serve as President of the Republic. After two years in power, Yhombi-Opango was accused of corruption and deviation from party directives, and removed from office on February 5, 1979, by the Central Committee of the PCT, which then simultaneously designated Vice President and Defense Minister Col. Denis Sassou-Nguesso as interim President.

The Central Committee directed Sassou-Nguesso to take charge of preparations for the Third Extraordinary Congress of the PCT, which proceeded to elect him President of the Central Committee and President of the Republic. Under a congressional resolution, Yhombi-Opango was stripped of all powers, rank, and possessions and placed under arrest to await trial for high treason. He was released from house arrest in late 1984 and ordered back to his native village of Owando.

== Democracy and civil war ==
After decades of turbulent politics bolstered by Marxist-Leninist rhetoric, and with the collapse of the Soviet Union, the Congolese gradually moderated their economic and political views to the point that, in 1992, Congo completed a transition to multi-party democracy. Ending a long history of one-party Marxist rule, a specific agenda for this transition was laid out during Congo's national conference of 1991 and culminated in August 1992 with multi-party parliamentary and presidential elections. Sassou Nguesso conceded defeat and Congo's new president, Professor Pascal Lissouba, was inaugurated on August 31, 1992.

Congolese democracy experienced severe trials in 1993 and early 1994. The president dissolved the National Assembly in November 1992, calling for new elections in May 1993. The results of those elections were disputed, touching off violent civil unrest in June and again in November. In February 1994 the decisions of an international board of arbiters were accepted by all parties, and the risk of large-scale insurrection subsided.

Lissouba lost favour with the French government early in his presidency by asking the American-owned Occidental Petroleum company to provide financial support for his government in exchange for promises of future oil production. As the French company Elf Aquitaine (which reaped much of its profits from the Republic of the Congo) had only just recently opened a large deep-water oil platform off the coast of Pointe-Noire, Mr. Lissouba was pressured by the French into canceling all contracts with Occidental Petroleum, but suspicions of Lissouba remained.

However, Congo's democratic progress derailed in 1997. As presidential elections scheduled for July 1997 approached, tensions between the Lissouba and Sassou Nguesso camps mounted. In May, a visit by Sassou Nguesso to Owando, Joachim Yhombi-Opango's political stronghold, led to the outbreak of violence between their supporters. On June 5, 1997, government forces surrounded Sassou Nguesso's home in the Mpila section of Brazzaville, attempting to arrest two men, Pierre Aboya and Engobo Bonaventure, who had been implicated in the earlier violence. Fighting broke out between the government forces and Sassou Nguesso's fighters, called Cobras, igniting a 4-month conflict that destroyed or damaged much of Brazzaville.

Angola supported Sassou Nguesso with about 1,000 Angolan tanks, troops. Support by the sympathetic French government further bolstered Sassou Nguesso's rebels.

Together these forces took Brazzaville and Pointe-Noire in the morning of October 16. Lissouba fled the capital while his soldiers surrendered and citizens began looting. Yhombi-Opango supported Lissouba during the war, serving as leader of the Presidential Majority, and after Sassou Nguesso's victory he fled into exile in Ivory Coast and France. Soon thereafter, Sassou Nguesso declared himself President and named a 33-member government.

In January 1998 the Sassou Nguesso regime held a National Forum for Reconciliation to determine the nature and duration of the transition period. The Forum, tightly controlled by the government, decided elections should be held in about three years, elected a transition advisory legislature, and announced that a constitutional convention will finalize a draft constitution. However, the eruption in late 1998 of fighting between Sassou Nguesso's government forces and an armed opposition disrupted the transitional return to democracy. This new violence also closed the economically vital Congo-Ocean Railway, caused great destruction and loss of life in southern Brazzaville and in the Pool, Bouenza, and Niari regions, and displaced hundreds of thousands of persons.

In November and December 1999, the government signed agreements with representatives of many, though not all, of the rebel groups. The December accord, mediated by President Omar Bongo of Gabon, called for follow-on, inclusive political negotiations between the government and the opposition.

== Sassou's second presidency ==
Sassou won elections in 2002 with an implausible 90% or so of the votes. His two main rivals, Lissouba and Bernard Kolelas, were prevented from competing and the only remaining credible rival, André Milongo, boycotted the elections and withdrew from the race due to, among other reasons, perceived voter fraud on the part of Sassou. A new constitution was agreed upon in January 2002, granting the president new powers and extending his term to seven years as well as introducing a new bicameral assembly. On December 30, twenty opposition political parties issued a statement through spokesman Chistope Ngokaka, saying Sassou's government had purchased "weapons and military craft... under contracts signed between the officials in Brazzaville and the government in Beijing." Sassou was re-elected for a further seven-year term at the next presidential election in July 2009.

The Sassou regime discriminates against and marginalizes minority groups in the Republic of the Congo to divide the populace for easier authoritarian control and power. LGBTQIA+ individuals are marginalized by the Sassou state, oppressed, and treated as second-class citizens. NGOs in Congo-Brazzaville reported physical and psychological harassment of LGBTQIA+ people; the government also takes part in the financial extortion of these individuals. LGBTQIA+ Congolese face significant challenges in obtaining employment due to their sexual identity and sexuality. Sassou’s regime takes part in the discrimination of LGBTQIA+ individuals to divide the populace, with a certain sect of the population being viewed as inferior by the majority of the population. Additionally, women are considered second-class citizens by the Sassou regime. Women are viewed as disposable, which has led to widespread sexual violence, denial of equal rights, and a life in extreme poverty. Sexual violence especially impacted young girls, according to the United Nations; 60 percent of sexual violence victims are girls under 13 or younger. Women also face widespread discrimination in divorce settlements, poverty, and employment. The Sassou regime uses division and repression to gain greater authoritarian control over the populace because, if the populace is divided, it cannot stand united against the state.

In 2015, Sassou changed the constitution to run in the 2016 election. He won the election believed by many to be fraudulent. After violent protests in the capital, Sassou attacked the Pool region, where the Ninja rebels of the civil war used to be based, in what was believed to be a distraction. This led to a revival of the Ninja rebels who launched attacks against the army in April 2016, leading 80,000 people to flee their homes. A ceasefire deal was signed in December 2017.

== See also ==
- History of Africa
- People's Republic of the Congo
- Politics of the Republic of the Congo
- List of heads of government of the Republic of the Congo
- List of heads of state of the Republic of the Congo
- Brazzaville history and timeline
- Scholastique Dianzinga

== Bibliography ==
- Appiah, Kwame Anthony; Gates, Henry Louis Jr., eds. (1999), Africana: The Encyclopedia of the African and African American Experience, New York: Basic Books.
- Bustin, Edouard (1963), Carter, Gwendolen Margaret (ed.), Five African States: Responses to Diversity: the Congo, Dahomey, the Cameroun Federal Republic, the Rhodesias and Nyasaland, South Africa, Ithaca, New York: Cornell University Press.
- Davidson, Basil (1969), Africa in History: Themes and Outlines, New York: Macmillan Publishers, OCLC 5673.
- Davidson, Basil (1973), The Africans: An Entry to Cultural History, Harmondsworth: Penguin Books.
- Massengo, Gualbert-Brice (2004), L'économie pétrolière du Congo: les effets pervers de la monoressource économique dans les pays en développement (in French), Paris: L'Harmattan.
- Moukoko, Philippe (1999), Dictionnaire Général du Congo-Brazzaville (in French), Paris: L'Harmattan.
- Petringa, Maria: Brazza, A Life for Africa. Bloomington, Indiana: AuthorHouse, 2006. ISBN 978-1-4259-1198-0
- United Nations Human Rights Office of the High Commissioner. “Committee against Torture Considers Report of the Republic of the Congo.” April 4, 2015. https://www.ohchr.org/en/press-releases/2015/04/committee-against-torture-considersreport-republic-congo
- U.S. Department of State. 2023 Country Reports on Human Rights Practices: Republic of the Congo. Washington, DC: Government Publishing Office, 2023. https://www.state.gov/reports/2023-country-reports-on-human-rights-practices/republicof-the-congo/.
- Wm. Roger Louis and Jean Stengers: E.D. Morel's History of the Congo Reform Movement, Clarendon Press Oxford, 1968.
