= Elections in the Republic of the Congo =

The Republic of the Congo elects on the national level a head of state – the president – and a legislature. The president is elected by the people. The Parliament (Parlement) has two chambers. The National Assembly (Assemblée Nationale) has 153 members, for a five-year term in single-seat constituencies. The Senate (Sénat) has 66 members, elected for a six-year term by district, local and regional councils. The Republic of Congo is a one party dominant state with the Congolese Labour Party in power. Opposition parties are allowed, but are widely considered to have no real chance of gaining power.

Elections are governed by Congo's election law, most recently modified in 2016.

== Latest elections ==
=== Presidential elections ===
Provisional results, which were announced by Interior Minister Raymond Mboulou on 17 March, revealed that the incumbent president, Denis Sassou Nguesso, was re-elected to a fifth term with 94.82% of the vote. Mboulou reported that the turnout of the election was 84.65%, with a total of 2.6 million ballots cast. However, this was in contrast to polling stations in Brazzaville being observed to have short lines or no lines at all. AAD candidate Mabio Mavoungou Zinga, the closest challenger to Sassou Nguesso, won 1.48% of the vote. Independent candidate Uphrem Dave Mafoula followed in third place with 1.03% of the vote.

Candidate	Party	Votes	%
Denis Sassou Nguesso	Congolese Party of Labour	2,509,456	94.90
Mavoungou Zinga Mabio	Alliance for Democratic Alternation in 2026	37,141	1.40
Uphrem Dave Mafoula	Independent	27,254	1.03
Destin Gavet	Republican Movement	23,060	0.87
Joseph Kignoumbi Kia Mboungou	La Chaine	22,744	0.86
Vivien Romain Manangou	Independent	15,994	0.60
Nganguia Engambé Anguios	Party for the Action of the Republic	8,694	0.33
Total		2,644,343	100.00
Valid votes		2,644,343	98.60
Invalid/blank votes		37,578	1.40
Total votes		2,681,921	100.00
Registered voters/turnout		3,155,751	84.99
Source: Constitutional Court

=== Parliamentary elections ===
Party	First round			Second round			Seats		
Party	Votes	%	Seats	Votes	%	Seats	Extended mandate (Note: The elections were not held in the Pool Department (9 seats). Instead, the term of the nine outgoing deputies was extended: Of these, five belonged to the Congolese Party of Labour and four to the Congolese Movement for Democracy and Integral Development.)	Total	+/−
Congolese Party of Labour			72			19	5	96	+7
Pan-African Union for Social Democracy			3			5	0	8	+1
Congolese Movement for Democracy and Integral Development			0			0	4	4	−3
Action and Renewal Movement			3			1	0	4	0
Rally for Democracy and Social Progress			2			1	0	3	−2
Dynamic for the Republic and Recovery			0			3	0	3	New
Union for a People's Movement			2			0	0	2	+2
Citizen Rally			1			0	0	1	−2
Republican and Liberal Party			0			1	0	1	0
Club 2002 – Party for the Unity and the Republic			1			0	0	1	0
Union of Democratic Forces			1			0	0	1	0
Party for Agreement and Political Action			1			0	0	1	+1
Patriotic Front			1			0	0	1	+1
Movement for Democracy and Progress			0			1	0	1	+1
Party for Unity, Liberty and Progress			0			1	0	1	+1
Congress for Democracy and the Republic			0			1	0	1	New
Republican Convention for Democracy and Progress			0			1	0	1	New
La Chaîne			0			1	0	1	New
National Movement for the Liberation of Congo			0			1	0	1	New
Independents			8			11	0	19	+7
Total			95			47	9	151	+12
Registered voters/turnout	2,221,596	–							
Source: Jeune Afrique, IPU

== See also ==
- Electoral calendar
- Electoral system
