= 2023 Republic of the Congo Senate election =

- 20 August 2023
- All 72 seats in the Senate; 37 seats needed for a majority
Party	Leader	Seats	+/–
PCT	Denis Sassou Nguesso	52	+8
RDPS	Jean-Marc Thystère Tchicaya	3	+1
MAR	Roland Bouiti-Viaudo	2	0
Club 2002	Wilfrid Nguesso	2	+1
PRL	Nicéphore Fylla de Saint-Eudes	1	0
UDLC		1	0
MCDDI		1	+1
RC	Claude Alphonse Nsilou	1	+1
LCEM		1	+1
UPADS	Pascal Tsaty Mabiala	1	−1
Independents	–	7	−5
This lists parties that won seats. See the complete results below.
President of the Senate before	President of the Senate after
Pierre Ngolo	Pierre Ngolo

Senate elections were held in the Republic of the Congo on 20 August 2023.

== Electoral system ==
The Senate is composed of 72 senators elected indirectly for a six-year term using first-past-the-post voting by an electoral college composed of municipal and departmental councillors with each of the twelve departments electing six senators.

== Results ==
Party	Seats	+/–
Congolese Party of Labour	52	+8
Rally for Democracy and Social Progress	3	+1
Action and Renewal Movement	2	0
Club 2002 – Party for the Unity and the Republic	2	+1
Liberal Republican Party	1	0
Union of Congolese Democrats and Liberals	1	0
Congolese Movement for Democracy and Integral Development	1	+1
Citizen Rally	1	+1
Congo on the Move	1	+1
Pan-African Union for Social Democracy	1	–1
Dynamic for the Republic and Development	0	0
Patriotic Front	0	–1
Party for Unity, Liberty and Progress	0	–1
Union of Humanist Democrats-Yuki	0	0
Independents	7	–5
Total	72	0
Source: Les Echos du Congo Brazzaville

== See also ==
- Politics of the Republic of the Congo
