= Serge Blanchard Oba =

Republic of the Congo politician

René Serge Blanchard Oba is a Congolese politician. He is the President of the Movement for Solidarity and Development (MSD), a political party, and he was the Administrator-General of the Congo Telecommunications Company (SOTELCO) from 2003 to 2008. He was a Deputy in the National Assembly of Congo-Brazzaville from 2007 to 2012.

== ONPT and SOTELCO ==
Oba was a trade union leader for a time; subsequently he worked as the Director-General of the National Office of Posts and Telecommunications (ONPT) and the National Savings Bank. He was considered a protégé of Edith Sassou Bongo, who was President Denis Sassou Nguesso's daughter as well as the wife of Omar Bongo, the President of Gabon. Speaking on 22 January 2002, he discussed the increasingly competitive environment faced by the ONPT due to mobile phone companies as well as a revision of telephone rates, which was implemented earlier in the month and intended to make the ONPT more competitive.

In the May 2002 parliamentary election, Oba stood as a candidate in the fifth constituency of Talangaï, a district of Brazzaville, but he and a number of other candidates were disqualified after the first round of voting by the National Election Organization Commission (CONEL) due to voting irregularities. Oba was accused of orchestrating violence and the destruction of ballot boxes. In response to CONEL's decision, Oba thanked his supporters and urged them to remain calm.

In 2003, when the ONPT was split into two separate companies, Oba was appointed to head the Congo Telecommunications Company (Société des télécommunications du Congo, SOTELCO), a new company in which the state was the primary shareholder. Oba presided over the commercial launch of SOTELCO on 7 May 2003, and he said on the occasion that SOTELCO planned to offer more reasonable rates.

However, the Ministry of Posts and Telecommunications announced on 18 June 2003 that Oba was being dismissed from his new post as Administrator-General of SOTELCO. Some SOTELCO employees, pleased by the move, met on 19 June to thank President Sassou Nguesso for ending their "nightmare" and to "condemn the delaying tactics" of Oba's supporters. Reactions in the press were varied. Le Coq criticized Jean Dello, the Minister of Posts and Telecommunications, for deciding to dismiss Oba, arguing that there was no basis for the move. Meanwhile, Tam Tam d'Afrique attributed the decision to Oba's "mismanagement" and the "poisonous atmosphere" that prevailed under his leadership.

The decision to dismiss Oba proved abortive, and he continued to direct the company. SOTELCO's finances were in a poor state in early 2005, but Oba anticipated that the problems would be resolved.

== The MSD ==
While directing SOTELCO, Oba devoted considerable time and money to sports as well as involvement in politics. He founded a political party, the MSD, which was part of the Presidential Majority and loyal to President Sassou Nguesso; ideologically it identified itself with social democracy. It held its constitutive congress at Dolisie in March 2007. Oba led the MSD as its president, while Jean-François Obembé was designated as Secretary-General and a National Convention of 476 members, as well as a Political Bureau of 159 members, were established. In an interview, Oba stressed the need for "a new discourse that focuses on the real problems of the Congolese people".

In the June 2007 parliamentary election, Oba's new party performed fairly well, winning five seats in the National Assembly. Oba stood as the MSD candidate in the fifth constituency of Talangaï, a district of Brazzaville. In the first round of voting, he received 47.07% of the vote against 38.31% for André Mbola, the candidate of the Congolese Labour Party (PCT). Because Oba fell short of an outright majority, he faced Mbola in a second round of voting. Oba narrowly defeated Mbola to win the seat in the August 2007 second round, receiving 51.06% of the vote.

According to Oba, his party spent more than one billion CFA francs on its 2007 election campaign. The high level of spending outraged many people, as it was unclear where the money had come from. Oba denied rumors that he had diverted money from SOTELCO to finance his party's campaign; on the same occasion, he said that SOTELCO had not received any subsidies from the state since the end of the 1997 civil war, making it the only one of Congo-Brazzaville's top five companies to have not benefited from a subsidy during that period. He observed that much of the company's technical capacity had been damaged during the war and said that 22 billion CFA francs were needed to repair the telecommunications network in Brazzaville, adding that SOTELCO needed to improve services in order to remain competitive in the context of economic liberalization.

Although Oba's political party had performed well in the 2007 election and he had lavished praise on Sassou Nguesso, he was not rewarded with a post in the government, and the MSD did not even receive a post in the Bureau of the National Assembly. Oba was dissatisfied by that outcome, feeling that his party was entitled to representation on the Bureau due to its share of seats. At around the same time, Oba was reportedly in conflict with Judicaël Okemba, who headed a private telecommunications company, Afripa Telecom Congo; notably, Okemba's father was Jean-Dominique Okemba, who was in turn a nephew of Sassou Nguesso and a very influential adviser to him. Meanwhile, SOTELCO's financial situation was continuing to deteriorate. By October 2007, the company could no longer pay its employees and was embroiled in a dispute with trade unions.

In December 2007, various parties supporting Sassou Nguesso formed the Rally of the Presidential Majority (RMP), a grouping that was intended to provide a basis for better organizational coordination among Sassou Nguesso's supporters. Oba's MSD refused to join the RMP. On 5 February 2008, he announced plans for a rally in Brazzaville on 16 February to express support for Sassou Nguesso's new social policies and "ensure their implementation", and also to launch the MSD's women's organization, Sisters of Denis Sassou Nguesso. On the same occasion, he affirmed that the MSD would present its own candidate lists in the 2008 local elections, separate from the RMP's joint candidate lists.

Speaking to his constituents on 27 February 2008, Oba discussed plans to create a Deputy's House in the constituency to facilitate the implementation of campaign promises and receive ideas and views from the people. He stressed, in response to constituent concerns, that the five-year parliamentary term was only just beginning and that all of his promises would be fulfilled, noting that he had already provided an ambulance, which would be kept at the Deputy's House.

In early 2008, SOTELCO was suffering some serious problems; months of wages had gone unpaid and the company was not performing competitively. Less than a year after the parliamentary election, Oba was removed from his post as Administrator-General of SOTELCO by order of President Sassou Nguesso on 5 March 2008. Although many considered Oba's management of the company to be poor, Sassou Nguesso's decision to remove him came as a surprise, as Oba had seemed "untouchable". Many SOTELCO employees were reportedly pleased by the decision. Emmanuel Koukambakana, who was designated to take over the company's administration in an interim capacity, succeeded Oba at SOTELCO in a ceremony held on 18 March 2008. Sassou Nguesso appointed one of his advisers, Akouala (known only by one name), to head the company on 28 March 2008.

Oba's dismissal occurred soon after his refusal to participate in the RMP, leading to speculation that he was dismissed as a retaliatory move. In a March 2008 interview with Jeune Afrique, Sassou Nguesso said that there was no relationship between the two events and noted that he had still had Oba's support, despite the latter's unwillingness to participate in the new grouping. Sassou Nguesso was terse on the matter and gave no specific explanation: "His term expired; I decided not to renew it. That's it."

After his sacking, Oba remained loyal to Sassou Nguesso and allied to the constellation of parties supporting Sassou Nguesso. He was the Honorary President of the Women of the Presidential Majority (FMP) in late 2008, when that group was organizing and mobilizing in preparation for Sassou Nguesso's presumed candidacy in the July 2009 presidential election. He was also the Honorary President of the Youth of the Presidential Majority (JMP) in late 2008. Some JMP leaders criticized Oba at that time, and in turn the MSD Political Commission, defending Oba, denounced those JMP leaders; the MSD stressed the importance of unity and cooperation in support of Sassou Nguesso's upcoming re-election campaign. Speaking to university students in Brazzaville on 21 June 2009, Oba called on the students to work for Sassou Nguesso's re-election and do their part to ensure a strong voter turnout. On behalf of the MSD, he signed an agreement on supporting Sassou Nguesso's candidacy with the PCT and the Club 2002 - PUR on 25 June 2009.

Oba was reportedly involved in a conflict with Akouala, who had succeeded him at SOTELCO (since rebranded as Congo Télécom), by late 2009. As part of his parliamentary constituency work, Oba began setting up various places in Talangaï's Quarter 68 to serve as public centers of communication and entertainment, complete with large television screens and available every night, in January 2010. Although the launch of the project coincided with the African Cup of Nations football tournament, Oba stressed that the centers would also be valuable as a way of informing the people about events.

On 3 October 2010, Oba visited his constituents to discuss parliamentary work. Explaining a bill regarding an agreement with the International Development Association, he assured his constituents that the government was working "in the framework of multilateral cooperation in order to gradually solve the vital problems of the people". He also expressed support for an initiative to add two new police stations in the constituency. Oba's constituents expressed their complaints about local problems and also complained that Oba did not visit his constituents to discuss parliamentary work often enough.

Prior to the PCT's Sixth Extraordinary Congress in July 2011, the party made a gesture of opening itself to other parties, leading some smaller parties of the Presidential Majority to merge themselves into the PCT. Speaking in an interview in late June 2011, Oba said that he did not reject in principle the notion of creating a broad political party that would support Sassou Nguesso, but he insisted that if it was done it should be done in a consensual way. He stressed that the MSD retained its independence.

In the July–August 2012 parliamentary election, the MSD failed to win any seats. Sassou Nguesso's daughter, Claudia Lembouma Sassou Nguesso, won the seat for the fifth constituency of Talangaï, previously held by Oba.

After a difficult period in which the MSD lost many members, the party held its first extraordinary congress on 7 June 2014. According to Oba, the purpose of the congress was to highlight the party's survival. He stressed the party's continued support for Sassou Nguesso and said that the MSD would support the candidate of the presidential majority in the 2016 presidential election. Oba was also re-elected as President of the MSD.

Later, Oba came out in opposition to moves to change the constitution to allow Sassou Nguesso to run again. After being injured in a car accident, he was flown to France for treatment. On 3 August 2015, when he tried to return to France for further treatment, he was barred from leaving the country at Maya-Maya International Airport. Oba claimed that this was a form of retaliation for his opposition to changing the constitution. He insisted that he was "a free Congolese citizen" and had the right to travel.
