= Florent Ntsiba =

Congolese politician (born 1949)

Florent Ntsiba (born 17 August 1949) is a Congolese politician. A high-ranking and long-time figure under President Denis Sassou Nguesso, Ntsiba initially rose to prominence through the military in the single-party regime of the Congolese Labour Party (PCT) in the 1970s. He was Minister of Information from 1979 to 1983; although he fell out of favor with the party leadership in 1983, he returned to the government as Minister of Equipment from 1989 to 1991.

After Sassou Nguesso regained power in the 1997 civil war, Ntsiba again returned to the government as Minister of Equipment and Public Works from 1997 to 2009. He was Minister of State for Labour and Social Security from 2009 to 2016, and he has been Director of the Cabinet of the President since 2017. Ntsiba holds the military rank of Général de division.

== Military–political career under single-party rule ==
Ntsiba, a member of the Téke ethnic group, was born in Lekana, located in the Plateaux Region of Congo-Brazzaville. He became an officer in the armed forces and was Director of the Cabinet of the Minister of Defense from 1975 to 1977. He was included in the ruling PCT's Military Committee of the Party (CMP) in 1977, at which time he held the rank of captain; also in 1977, he was appointed as Secretary-General of the First Vice-Presidency for Coordination of the Activities of the Party, as well as Spokesman of the CMP. Ntsiba remained Spokesman of the CMP until 1979. He played a role in the ouster of Joachim Yhombi-Opango by the PCT leadership in early 1979, and under Yhombi-Opango's successor, President Denis Sassou Nguesso, Ntsiba was elected to the Political Bureau of the PCT in 1979 and was assigned responsibility for press and propaganda. He was also included in the government as Minister of Information, Posts and Telecommunications in 1979.

At a session of the PCT Central Committee in April 1983, Ntsiba was removed from the Political Bureau and suspended from the Central Committee for ideological weakness; as a result, he resigned from his position as Minister of Information, Posts and Telecommunications in May 1983. He was not included in the Central Committee elected at the PCT's July 1984 congress, but he was politically rehabilitated in later in the 1980s and appointed to head SIACIC, the national cement company.

At the PCT's Fourth Ordinary Congress on 26–31 July 1989, Ntsiba regained a seat on the Central Committee, and after the congress he was appointed to the government as Minister of Equipment, in charge of the Environment, on 13 August 1989. Civil servants at his ministry went on strike to protest his alleged favoritism towards ethnic Téke when making appointments. When the PCT lost power in 1991, Ntsiba lost his post in the government.

== Political career since 1997 ==
After Sassou Nguesso returned to power in the June–October 1997 civil war, he appointed Ntsiba to the government again as Minister of Equipment and Public Works on 2 November 1997. Following the resignation from the government of Martin Mbéri in 2001, Ntsiba additionally assumed responsibility for the Ministry of Construction.

Ntsiba was an unsuccessful candidate in Lekana constituency in the May–June 2002 parliamentary election; he was defeated in the second round of voting by fellow minister André Okombi Salissa. He was nevertheless retained as Minister of Equipment and Public Works in the government appointed on 18 August 2002, but his additional responsibility for the Ministry of Construction was transferred to Claude-Alphonse Nsilou on 23 August 2002.

Sassou Nguesso was re-elected in the July 2009 presidential election. In the post-election government appointed on 15 September 2009, Ntsiba was moved to the post of Minister of State for Labour and Social Security. The government was also reorganized into four broad sectors, with one minister assigned responsibility for coordinating each of the four sectors; Ntsiba was one of the ministers chosen as a coordinator and was assigned the socio-cultural sector. Ntsiba succeeded Gilbert Ondongo at the Ministry of Labour on 22 September 2009, and he in turn handed over the Ministry of Equipment to Émile Ouosso later on the same day. On 28 September, Ntsiba chaired the first meeting of the ministers included in the socio-cultural sector.

Ntsiba was a member of the New Democratic Forces (FDN), a political party that supported Sassou Nguesso. At the FDN's May 2010 congress, it established the High Council of Dignitaries, a consultative body intended to advise the FDN Executive Bureau; Ntsiba was included as one of its seven members, and it was installed on 1 June 2010.

Following the July–August 2012 parliamentary election, Ntsiba remained in his post in the government named on 25 September 2012, but the system of sector coordinators was eliminated.

Speaking in the Senate on 29 November 2013, Ntsiba condemned arrogance and cited the example of his own past: "Every morning, I read, with arrogance, the communiques of the CMP", referring to his role as CMP Spokesman in the late 1970s. He said that he had changed in the years since, going "from Lenin to Cicero".

Ntsiba opened the Departmental Directorate of the National Social Security Fund (CNSS) for the Pool Department, located at Kinkala, on 14 July 2014, in order to facilitate access to CNSS services for people in the department.

After Sassou Nguesso's victory in the March 2016 presidential election, Ntsiba was dismissed from the government on 30 April 2016. He was appointed as Director of the Cabinet of President Sassou Nguesso, with the rank of Minister of State, on 22 August 2017.
