= Fernand Sabaye =

Congolese politician

Fernand Sabaye is a Congolese politician who has served as a Deputy in the National Assembly of Congo-Brazzaville since 2002.

== Political career ==
After the June–October 1997 civil war, Sabaye was included as one of the 75 members of the National Transitional Council (CNT), which served as a transitional legislature from 1998 to 2002. In the May–June 2002 parliamentary election, he stood as the candidate of the Congolese Labour Party (PCT) in Bétou constituency, located in Likouala Region. He easily won the seat in the first round of voting, receiving 93.63% of the vote. After the National Assembly began meeting for its new term, Sabaye was designated as First Vice-President of the National Assembly's Legal and Administrative Affairs Commission on 24 August 2002.

In the June–August 2007 parliamentary election, Sabaye stood for re-election as the PCT candidate in Bétou. Sabaye, who was identified with the reformist wing of the PCT, placed second in the first round of voting; he received 46.27% of the vote against 47.80% for Pauline Dendé Solange, who was identified with the PCT's conservative wing and was standing as an independent candidate. Sabaye succeeded in winning re-election in the second round of voting, receiving 60.29% of the vote. After the National Assembly began meeting for its new term, Sabaye was again designated as First Vice-President of the National Assembly's Legal and Administrative Affairs Commission on 18 September 2007. Dendé Solange appealed the result of the vote in Bétou to the Constitutional Court, accusing Sabaye of transferring voters and campaigning after the official end of the campaign period. Sabaye's lawyer denied the allegations and in turn accused Dendé Solange's supporters of setting fire to electoral materials at three polling stations, preventing those stations from reporting their results. Dendé Solange's appeal was rejected on 26 October 2007.

At the PCT's Sixth Extraordinary Congress, held in July 2011, Sabaye was designated as the PCT's Secretary for Youth and included on its 51-member Political Bureau.

In the July–August 2012 parliamentary election, Sabaye was re-elected to the National Assembly as the PCT candidate in Bétou; he won the seat in the first round with 75.52% of the vote. After the National Assembly began meeting for its new term, Sabaye was again designated as First Vice-President of the National Assembly's Legal and Administrative Affairs Commission on 19 September 2012.

During the campaign for the September 2014 local elections, Sabaye was dispatched to Sangha Department to campaign for the PCT's candidates there.

In the July 2017 parliamentary election, Sabaye stood unopposed as a candidate in Bétou, with no other candidates standing in the constituency. He was designated as President of the Legal and Administrative Affairs Commission of the National Assembly on 2 September 2017.
