= Benoît Bati =

Congolese politician

Benoît Bati is a Congolese politician who served in the government of Congo-Brazzaville as minister-delegate for the digital economy from 2016 to 2017. Previously he was a deputy in the National Assembly of Congo-Brazzaville from 2002 to 2016, and he has been president of the Foreign Affairs Commission of the National Assembly since 2017.

== Political career ==
Bati served as a magistrate for a time, and during the late 1990s he was a member of the National Resistance Council (CNR), which acted as the political leadership for rebel militias fighting the government in southern Congo-Brazzaville. The CNR made peace with the government in late 1999. In the May–June 2002 parliamentary election, he stood as the LADIP candidate in Tsiaki constituency, located in Bouenza Region. He won the seat in the first round of voting, receiving 54.19% of the vote.

In the June–August 2007 parliamentary election, Bati stood for re-election as the candidate of the Life Party in Tsiaki. He won the seat, receiving 53.83% of the vote. After the National Assembly began meeting for its new term, Bati was designated as Second Vice-President of the National Assembly's Legal and Administrative Affairs Commission on 18 September 2007. He was also President of the Italy-Congo Friendship Association in the National Assembly.

When Italian representatives of the anti-death penalty organization Hands Off Cain visited Congo-Brazzaville in November 2010, Bati was one of three members of the National Assembly who discussed the death penalty with the representatives. In reference to the group's name, Bati said that they should not "lose sight of Abel" (the victim) by focusing on "Cain" (the offender).

At the Sixth Extraordinary Congress of the Congolese Labour Party (PCT), held in July 2011, Bati was elected to the PCT's 471-member Central Committee.

In the July–August 2012 parliamentary election, Bati stood for re-election as the PCT candidate in Tsiaki. In the first round of voting, he received 43.62% of the vote, while Guy-Richard Sibi, an independent candidate, received 35.07%. Facing Sibi in a second round of voting, Bati won the seat with 56.70% of the vote. Subsequently, he was designated as President of the National Assembly's Legal and Administrative Affairs Commission on 19 September 2012. A bill proposed by Bati regarding the organization of associations was slated for consideration by the National Assembly at a session that began on 2 July 2014.

After President Denis Sassou Nguesso's victory in the March 2016 presidential election, he appointed Bati as Minister-Delegate for the Digital Economy, working under Prime Minister Clément Mouamba. In the July 2017 parliamentary election, he was re-elected to the National Assembly as the PCT candidate in Tsiaki, winning the seat in the first round with 58% of the vote. Following the election, Bati was dismissed from the government on 22 August 2017. He was designated as President of the Foreign Affairs Commission of the National Assembly on 2 September 2017.
