= Action and Renewal Movement =

Centre-left political party in the Republic of the Congo

Action and Renewal Movement Mouvement Action et Renouveau
- Abbreviation: MAR
- President: Roland Bouiti-Viaudo
- Founder: Jean-Baptiste Tati Loutard
- Founded: 2006
- Ideology: Social democracy
- Political position: Centre-left
- Colours: Orange
- Senate: 2 / 72
- National Assembly: 4 / 151

Website
- Official website

The Action and Renewal Movement (French: Mouvement Action et Renouveau, MAR) is a political party in the Republic of the Congo. It was founded by Jean-Baptiste Tati Loutard, who was the party's president until his death in 2009. He was succeeded by incumbent leader Roland Bouiti-Viaudo, who formerly served as Mayor of Pointe-Noire and Minister of State for Hydrocarbons. The party supports the presidency of Denis Sassou Nguesso.

MAR held its constitutive congress in late December 2006, marking its transformation into a political party; 342 delegates attended the congress. In the parliamentary election held on 24 June and 5 August 2007, the party won five out of 137 seats. The party has since been part of Sassou Nguesso's governing coalition.

== Electoral history ==
=== National Assembly elections ===
Election	Party leader	Votes	%	Seats	+/–	Position	Result
2007	Jean-Baptiste Tati Loutard			5 / 137	New	▲4th	Coalition (PCT–MCDDI–MAR–MSD-Club 2002–AGIR–UPDP)
2012	Roland Bouiti-Viaudo			4 / 139	▼1	▼5th	Coalition (PCT-MCDDI-RDPS-MAR-RC-UFD-UR-Club 2002
2017	Roland Bouiti-Viaudo			4 / 151	0	▲4th	Coalition (PCT-MAR-RDSP-RC-PRL-UFD-Club 2002)
2022	Roland Bouiti-Viaudo			4 / 151	0	4th	Coalition (PCT-MAR-Club 2002-RDSP)
