= Sylvestre Ossiala =

Congolese politician

Sylvestre Ossiala is a Congolese politician. A specialist in the oil industry, he was a Deputy in the National Assembly of Congo-Brazzaville from 2002 to 2017. He was also the Second Vice-President of the National Assembly from 2012 to 2017.

== Political career ==
Ossiala studied in France in the 1980s, receiving a degree in management science from the University of Caen in 1987 and a degree in petroleum management from the French Petroleum Institute in 1988. He wrote a thesis on the "Optimal production and pricing strategy for oil-exporting countries" (Stratégie optimale de production et de prix pour les pays exportateurs d'hydrocarbures). Ossiala worked in the oil industry as part of the budget and control department of Bouygues Offshore from 1990 to 1992 and then as part of the accounting and law department of ARCO from 1992 to 1993.

During the presidency of Pascal Lissouba, Ossiala was appointed as High Commissioner of Hydrocarbons in 1993. He remained in that post until 1994; subsequently he was Economy, Revenue, and Contracts Adviser at the Ministry of Hydrocarbons from 1994 to 2002.

In the May 2002 parliamentary election, Ossiala stood as the candidate of the Rally for Democracy and the Republic (RDR) for the third constituency of Talangaï, a district of Brazzaville. The RDR was part of the United Democratic Forces (FDU), a grouping of parties supporting President Denis Sassou Nguesso. Ossiala won the seat in the second round of voting, held in June 2002. He credited his victory to "the contract of loyality I signed with voters" and "the simplicity of my speeches and my actions" and noted that he had avoided "personal invective" when campaigning. In the National Assembly, Ossiala joined the Economy and Finance Commission.

Much of Ossiala's 2002 campaign centered around the training and employment of young people. Later in 2002, the Talangaï Development Agency began working to implement Ossiala's campaign promises by training young people to do various jobs. In line with his campaign promises, he also initiated construction of a bridge in Talangaï in October 2002, both to improve mobility in the district and to provide employment.

Meeting with constituents on 20 June 2003, Ossiala discussed the work of the National Assembly's second ordinary session. When discussing decentralization laws, he said that it was important for local communities to become more self-sufficient in managing their problems, rather than relying on the central government for help. Ossiala's constituents raised complaints related to health and educational infrastructure, as well as the availability of drinking water. Ossiala replied that the central government and the municipal government would try to address those problems. He also inaugurated the bridge.

Acting on another campaign promise, he delivered 250,000 CFA francs, along with school supplies, to the Liberté primary school in Talangaï on 7 January 2004.

While continuing his work in the National Assembly, Ossiala began teaching a course on issues related to the oil industry at Brazzaville's Marien Ngouabi University in 2005.

=== Activities since 2007 ===
After the RDR went into opposition, Ossiala quit the party and then joined the ruling Congolese Labour Party (PCT) a few months before the June 2007 parliamentary election. In that election, he stood for re-election to the National Assembly as the PCT candidate for the third constituency of Talangaï. He placed first in the first round, receiving 38.09% of the vote, but because he fell short of a majority he had to face the second place candidate—Oko Gantsebe, an independent candidate—in a second round. Ossiala won the seat in the second round, held in August 2007, with 61.30% of the vote.

Shortly after the National Assembly began meeting for its new parliamentary term, Ossiala was designated as one of 26 members of an ad hoc commission that was assigned the task of reviewing the National Assembly's internal and financial regulations on 5 September 2007. Ossiala led the commission's work, chairing its five-member executive bureau. When that preliminary work was complete, Ossiala was elected as President of the National Assembly's Economy and Finance Commission on 18 September 2007.

In July 2009, Ossiala launched an initiative to finance small, individual projects for about 500 young people in his constituency through monthly payment installments.

As a supporter of President Denis Sassou Nguesso, Ossiala launched an organization called the Ossiala Dynamic for the Future Path (Dynamique Ossiala pour le Chemin d'avenir) while visiting his constituents on 6 May 2010. The organization was intended to serve as a discussion forum for residents of Brazzaville quarters 63 and 66 regarding Sassou Nguesso's Future Path (chemin d'avenir) development program. According to Ossiala, the broader purpose of the organization was to encourage people "to change their mentality, to have faith in the future and to have hope". On the same occasion, he donated generators, televisions, and freezers to some constituents, while also promising to set up two giant television screens so his constituents could watch the June 2010 World Cup in South Africa.

At the PCT's Sixth Extraordinary Congress, held in July 2011, Ossiala was elected to the PCT's 471-member Central Committee. In the July 2012 parliamentary election, Ossiala was re-elected to the National Assembly as the PCT candidate in the third constituency of Talangaï; he won the seat in the first round of voting, receiving 65.95% of the vote. Thanking his constituents for their continued support, Ossiala distributed the meat of three oxen to supporters, saying that the act of sharing symbolized the victory he shared with his constituents. When the National Assembly began meeting for its new parliamentary term, the deputies elected Ossiala as Second Vice-President of the National Assembly on 5 September 2012.

The Economic Action of Denis Sassou Nguesso: Strength and Weakness (L'action économique de Denis Sassou N'Guesso: force et faiblesse), a book written by Ossiala about the various development plans conducted during Sassou Nguesso's time in office, was published in 2013.

For the July 2017 parliamentary election, Ossiala was replaced by Pierre Obambi as the PCT candidate in the third constituency of Talangaï.
