= Rally for Democracy and Social Progress =

Political party in the Republic of the Congo

- President: Jean-Marc Thystère-Tchicaya
- Secretary-General: Julien Makoundi Tchibinda
- Founder: Jean-Pierre Thystère Tchicaya
- Founded: 29 October 1990
- Split from: National Union for Democracy and Progress
- Headquarters: Pointe-Noire
- Ideology: Liberalism; Anti-communism
- Political position: Centre-right
- Seats in the National Assembly: 3 / 151
- Seats in the Senate: 1 / 72

The Rally for Democracy and Social Progress (French: Rassemblement pour la démocratie et le progrès social, RDPS) is a political party in the Republic of the Congo, founded by Jean-Pierre Thystère Tchicaya.

== History ==
Thystère Tchicaya founded the RDPS on 29 October 1990, after splitting from another opposition group, the National Union for Democracy and Progress (UNDP). The RDPS won nine seats in the June–July 1992 parliamentary election.

Initially part of the National Alliance for Democracy (AND), a coalition of left-wing parties that supported Pascal Lissouba, the RDPS soon broke with the AND and joined the Union for Democratic Renewal (URD) opposition coalition, led by Bernard Kolélas. Together with the Union for the Republic (UR) and the Movement for Democracy and Salvation (MDS), the RDPS formed an alliance, the Movement for Unity and Reconstruction (MUR), in November 1996. A few days after rebels loyal to Denis Sassou Nguesso captured Brazzaville, the capital, at the end of the civil war in October 1997, Tchicaya announced the support of the RDPS for Sassou Nguesso.

In the parliamentary election held on 24 June and 5 August 2007, the party won two out of 137 seats.

RDPS President Thystère Tchicaya died on 20 June 2008. Bernard Batchi succeeded him as Interim President of the RDPS. Later, the party was led by Thystère Tchicaya's son, Jean-Marc Thystère Tchicaya. On 10 August 2015 he was nominated Minister of Hydrocarbures, allowing RDPS to formally join the government. In January 2016, the party pledged its support for Denis Sassou Nguesso in the March 2016 presidential election.

The party contested the 2017 parliamentary election as part of the presidential majority winning only three out of 151 seats. Following the election Jean-Marc Thystère Tchicaya was reconfirmed ad Minister of Hydrocarbures in the newly formed Clément Mouamba's second cabinet. In the 2021 presidential election the party supported once again Sassou Nguesso's candidacy, that was reelected for his fourth term. The following year, in the occasion of the 2022 parliamentary election the party obtained only two seats, one down from the previous election.

== Electoral history ==
=== Presidential elections ===
Election year	Candidate	1st Round		2nd Round		Results
Election year	Candidate	# Votes	% Votes	# Votes	% Votes	Results
1992	Jean-Pierre Thystère Tchicaya	45,466	5.80%	—N/a		Lost ✗

=== National Assembly elections ===
Election	Party leader	Votes	%	Seats	+/–	Position	Result
1992	Jean-Pierre Thystère Tchicaya			9 / 125	New	▲4th	Snap elections
1993	Jean-Pierre Thystère Tchicaya			10 / 101	▲1	4th	Opposition
2002 (Note: Run within the United Democratic Forces coalition.)	Jean-Pierre Thystère Tchicaya			30 / 137	▲20	▲2nd	Coalition (PCT–FDU)
2007	Jean-Pierre Thystère Tchicaya			2 / 137	▼28	▼10th	Support
2012	Jean-Marc Thystère Tchicaya			5 / 139	▲3	▲4th	Support 2012-15
2012	Jean-Marc Thystère Tchicaya			5 / 139	▲3	▲4th	Coalition 2015-17 (PCT-MCDDI-RDPS-MAR-RC-UFD-UR-Club 2002)
2017	Jean-Marc Thystère Tchicaya			3 / 151	▼2	▼5th	Coalition (PCT-MAR-RDPS-RC-PRL-UFD-Club 2002)
2022	Jean-Marc Thystère Tchicaya			2 / 151	▼1	▼8th	Coalition (PCT-MAR-Club 2002–RDPS)
