= Alphonse-Mexil Etongo =

Republic of the Congo politician

Alphonse-Mexil Etongo is a Congolese politician who has served in the Senate of Congo-Brazzaville since 2011. Previously he was Director of Research and Planning at the Ministry of Health and Population.

== Political career ==
Etongo became Director of Research and Planning at the Ministry of Health and Population on 14 February 2005.

Standing as a candidate of the Club 2002 – Party for the Unity of the Republic, Etongo ran unsuccessfully for a seat in the National Assembly in the June–August 2007 parliamentary election. He placed second in the first round of voting, behind Antoinette Ganongo Olou, the candidate of the Congolese Labour Party (PCT); he received 29.08% of the vote against 32.13% for Olou. Following that defeat, he headed Club 2002's list for the Brazzaville district of Mfilou in the June 2008 local election.

In the October 2011 Senate election, Etongo was elected to the Senate as a Club 2002 candidate in Brazzaville. His election to the Senate was considered surprising.

Standing as a Club 2002 candidate, Etongo was elected as a local councillor in the Djiri section of Brazzaville in the September 2014 local elections.
