= Blandine Nianga =

Politician in Congo-Brazzaville

Blandine Nianga is a politician with the Congolese Party of Labour (PCT) in Congo-Brazzaville. She is the Deputy for the Talangai 1 constituency, Brazzaville Department, and a member of the political bureau of the PCT.

Campaigning in the 2017 parliamentary election, Nianga announced her priorities to be education and health. At the start of the 2019–20 school year she donated school supplies and food to pre-school and primary school children at the 31 July 1968 School, a school in Mpila in her electoral district.
