= 2017 Republic of the Congo parliamentary election =

- 16 July 2017 (first round); 30 July 2017 (second round)

151 seats in the National Assembly 76 seats needed for a majority
- Turnout: 2,221,596 (▲5.2%)
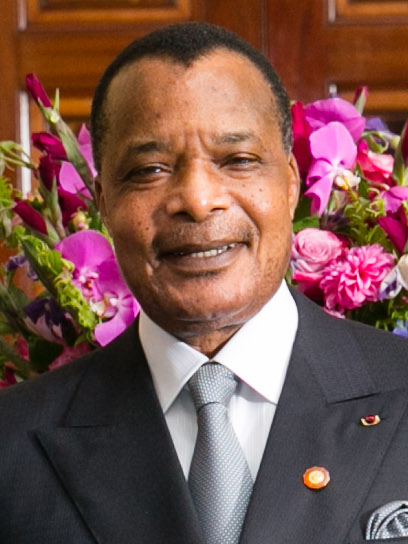

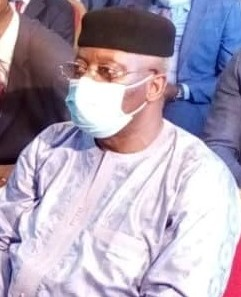
	First party	Second party
Leader	Denis Sassou Nguesso	Pascal Tsaty-Mabiala
Party	PCT	UPADS
Seats won	96	8
Seat change	▲7	▲1

Parliamentary elections were held in the Republic of the Congo on 16 July 2017, with a second round of voting following on 30 July in constituencies where no candidate secured a majority.

== Background ==
Following a 2015 referendum on a new constitution, President Denis Sassou Nguesso was re-elected in the March 2016 presidential elections. The 2017 parliamentary elections were the first elections to the National Assembly held under the 2015 constitution. In the previous parliamentary election, held in 2012, Sassou Nguesso's party, the Congolese Party of Labour (PCT), won a majority of seats.

The PCT fielded candidates in 128 out of 151 constituencies in the 2017 election, far more than its rivals. Aside from the PCT, candidates from various smaller parties and independent candidates also supported Sassou Nguesso, and in many cases the competition for seats was mainly between supporters of the President.

Meanwhile, the opposition to Sassou Nguesso was divided on whether to participate. The Pan-African Union for Social Democracy (UPADS) opted to contest the elections, although it fielded candidates in only 43 constituencies, a fact that UPADS leader Pascal Tsaty Mabiala blamed on the increased cost of candidate deposits. Guy-Brice Parfait Kolélas, who placed a distant second behind Sassou Nguesso in the 2016 presidential elections, also chose to participate, leading a new party, the Union of Humanist Democrats (UDH-Yuki), into the elections; the UDH-Yuki fielded candidates in 31 constituencies. However, other elements of the opposition, grouped together in a coalition led by Claudine Munari, refused to participate, arguing that Sassou Nguesso's re-election was illegitimate and that it would be improper to hold an election while the Pool Department was suffering from renewed fighting involving "Ninja" rebels under Frédéric Bintsamou.

Under the terms of the new constitution, an official post of Leader of the Opposition was to be introduced following the election.

== Electoral system ==
The 151 members of the National Assembly were elected in single-member constituencies using the two-round system; if no candidate received a majority of the votes in the first round, a run-off was held. The number of seats was increased from 139 at the 2012 election. Candidates were required to pay a deposit of 1,500,000 CFA francs; previously only a deposit of 100,000 CFA francs was required. A total of 711 candidates stood in the election across all 151 constituencies.

The number of registered voters was about 2.2 million. There were 4,386 designated polling stations, although it was thought that polling stations located in parts of the Pool Department affected by ongoing violence might not be operational.

== Campaign ==
Twenty government ministers stood as parliamentary candidates, although holding a parliamentary seat was not a requirement for ministerial service and they would in any case cede their seats to their substitutes if they remained in the government after the election. Some of the most prominent members of the government standing for election, including Clément Mouamba (Prime Minister), Gilbert Ondongo (Minister of the Economy), Raymond Mboulou (Minister of the Interior), Pierre Mabiala (Minister of Justice), Jean-Jacques Bouya (Minister of Spatial Planning and Major Projects), and Firmin Ayessa (Director of the President's Cabinet), were unopposed in their constituencies. Some other ministers, such as Hellot Matson Mampouya (Minister of Scientific Research) and Anatole Collinet Makosso (Minister of Primary and Secondary Education)—both of whom were beaten in the 2012 election—faced an assortment of opponents. Leonidas Mottom, the Minister of Culture, was injured in an automobile accident while campaigning for a seat in Ouesso. Another high-profile candidate was Denis-Christel Sassou Nguesso, the President's son, standing for re-election in his father's hometown of Oyo. Some younger politicians standing in the election were associated with him, a reflection of his growing influence.

== Conduct ==
The African Union sent an electoral observer mission headed by former Malian Prime Minister Django Sissoko.

Election day on 16 July passed without major incidents, although there were some minor delays in opening polling stations and suggestions of low turnout. In Kellé, in Cuvette-Ouest Department, there was an incident in which protesters temporarily removed ballot boxes, alleging favoritism by the electoral commission toward the PCT's candidate. A new vote was held in two constituencies, Kellé and Kingoué, on 24 July, and the repeat voting was conducted successfully.

As expected, voting was not held on election day in eight of the Pool Department's 14 constituencies due to violence.

== Results ==
Results of the first round, released on 21 July, showed that 93 candidates won their seats with outright majorities, including 70 PCT candidates. 28 PCT candidates secured spots in the second round of voting, to be held on 30 July. As for the opposition, seven members of the newly founded UDH-Yuki led by Kolélas were elected (formally they stood as independent candidates because their party had been created too recently to appear on the ballot), along with three UPADS candidates. The performances of both UPADS and another historically important party, the Congolese Movement for Democracy and Integral Development (MCDDI), were considered poor. Turnout was reportedly low in the two main cities, Brazzaville and Pointe-Noire, but higher elsewhere.

In the delayed voting held in two constituencies, Kellé and Kingoué, on 24 July, the PCT candidates were elected in the first round. As voting could not be held in nine constituencies in the Pool Department due to violence, the deputies for those seats from the previous parliamentary term were allowed in remain in place until elections could be held. Five of those deputies belonged to the PCT; Kolélas was also among them.

Results of the second round, announced on the night of 2–3 August, showed the PCT winning 18 seats, giving it a total of 90. The UDH-Yuki and UPADS ended up with totals of eight seats each. The MCDDI failed to win any seats in the election. The Rally for Democracy and Social Progress (RDPS) won three seats, down from five in 2012.

Three children of President Sassou Nguesso won seats: Denis-Christel Sassou Nguesso (in Oyo) and Claudia Sassou Nguesso (in Talangaï) were re-elected, while another daughter, Stella Sassou Nguesso, won a seat for the first time (in Kintélé). Three of the government ministers who stood for election were defeated: Émile Ouosso, Euloge Landry Kolélas (President of the MCDDI), and Hellot Matson Mampouya.

Minister of the Interior Raymond Mboulou, reporting to the Council of Ministers on the conduct of the election on 7 August, said that turnout was 44.44%, while noting the disparity in turnout between urban and rural areas, with it being higher in the latter.

Party	First round			Second round			Seats		
Party	Votes	%	Seats	Votes	%	Seats	Extended mandate (Note: The elections were not held in the Pool Department (9 seats). Instead, the term of the nine outgoing deputies was extended: Of these, five belonged to the Congolese Party of Labour and four to the Congolese Movement for Democracy and Integral Development.)	Total	+/−
Congolese Party of Labour			72			19	5	96	+7
Pan-African Union for Social Democracy			3			5	0	8	+1
Congolese Movement for Democracy and Integral Development			0			0	4	4	−3
Action and Renewal Movement			3			1	0	4	0
Rally for Democracy and Social Progress			2			1	0	3	−2
Dynamic for the Republic and Recovery			0			3	0	3	New
Union for a People's Movement			2			0	0	2	+2
Citizen Rally			1			0	0	1	−2
Republican and Liberal Party			0			1	0	1	0
Club 2002 – Party for the Unity and the Republic			1			0	0	1	0
Union of Democratic Forces			1			0	0	1	0
Party for Agreement and Political Action			1			0	0	1	+1
Patriotic Front			1			0	0	1	+1
Movement for Democracy and Progress			0			1	0	1	+1
Party for Unity, Liberty and Progress			0			1	0	1	+1
Congress for Democracy and the Republic			0			1	0	1	New
Republican Convention for Democracy and Progress			0			1	0	1	New
La Chaîne			0			1	0	1	New
National Movement for the Liberation of Congo			0			1	0	1	New
Independents			8			11	0	19	+7
Total			95			47	9	151	+12
Registered voters/turnout	2,221,596	–							
Source: Jeune Afrique, IPU

== Aftermath ==
As the UDH-Yuki and UPADS both won eight seats, it was not initially clear whether Guy-Brice Parfait Kolélas or Pascal Tsaty Mabiala would receive the new post of Leader of the Opposition, which was supposed to go to the leader of the largest opposition group in the National Assembly.

Prime Minister Mouamba submitted the pro forma resignation of his government on 16 August.

When the National Assembly began meeting for the new parliamentary term on 19 August 2017, the deputies elected Isidore Mvouba, a PCT deputy, as President of the National Assembly; he was the only candidate for the post and received 144 votes. The vote for President of the National Assembly and the other six posts in the Bureau of the National Assembly was held by secret ballot, but there was only one candidate for each post, and all but one of those posts went to deputies from the pro-government majority (one post, Second Secretary, was reserved for the opposition, allowing it to have representation in the Bureau): Léon Alfred Opimbat as First Vice-President (142 votes), Roland Bouiti Viaudo as Second Vice-President (142 votes), Pierre Obambi as First Secretary (141 votes), Joseph Kignoumbi Kia Mboungou as Second Secretary (142 votes), Virginie Dolama as First Quaestor (141 votes), and Léonidas Mottom as Second Quaestor (139 votes).

Sassou Nguesso reappointed Clément Mouamba as Prime Minister on 21 August. The composition of Mouamba's new government was announced on 22 August; it was slightly smaller than his previous government (35 members compared to 38), but the changes in the composition of the government were considered relatively minor.

Indirect Senate elections followed on 31 August. The senators were elected at the departmental level by departmental and municipal councillors; the elections for the councillors themselves were held concurrently with the July parliamentary election. 66 seats were at stake in the Senate election: six seats each for 11 departments (there are 12 departments in total, but voting was not held in the Pool Department, and its incumbent senators were to remain in office until a vote could be held). The Senate election produced a majority for the PCT, which won 44 seats. Most of the remaining seats were won by other pro-government parties or independent candidates. UPADS won two seats.
