= Roland Bouiti-Viaudo =

Republic of the Congo politician

Roland Bouiti-Viaudo is a Congolese politician who was Mayor of Pointe-Noire, the second-largest city in Congo-Brazzaville, from 2003 to 2017. He has served as Second Vice-President of the National Assembly since 2017, and has been the President of the Movement for Action and Renewal (MAR), a political party, since 2010.

== Political career ==
After the June–October 1997 civil war, Bouiti-Viaudo was included as one of the 75 members of the National Transitional Council (CNT), which served as a transitional legislature from 1998 to 2002. He was elected as Mayor of Pointe-Noire by the municipal council on 12 February 2003.

In the June 2007 parliamentary election, Bouiti-Viaudo was elected to the National Assembly as the MAR candidate in the second constituency of Hinda, located in Kouilou Region. He won the seat with 53.30% of the vote. Following the 29 June 2008 local elections, Bouti-Viaudo was re-elected by the city council as Mayor of Pointe-Noire on 30 July 2008.

Jean-Baptiste Tati-Loutard founded MAR and led the party until his death in 2009. Subsequently, a party congress was held on 5–6 February 2010 and Bouiti-Viaudo was elected as President of MAR. After Bouiti-Viaudo took over the leadership, the party undertook an initiative to revitalize itself, beginning with a campaign in Pointe-Noire in May 2010 to encourage people to join the party and receive membership cards.

Speaking on 21 June 2010, Bouiti-Viaudo denied a newspaper report saying that there were tensions between the MAR and the Congolese Labour Party (PCT) in Niari Region. He stressed that the two parties were both members of the Presidential Majority supporting President Denis Sassou Nguesso and that they maintained an excellent relationship. He also said that the PCT—Sassou Nguesso's own party—was the leading force in the Rally of the Presidential Majority (RMP) and that the MAR was second in importance.

In the July–August 2012 parliamentary election, Bouiti-Viaudo stood as the MAR candidate in Loango constituency, located in Kouilou Department. He won the seat in the first round with 56.55% of the vote.

Standing as a MAR candidate, Bouiti-Viaudo was elected as a local councillor in the Lumumba section of Pointe-Noire in the September 2014 local elections. He was then re-elected for a third term as Mayor of Pointe-Noire by the city council on 23 October 2014, receiving 82 out of 85 votes. He was the only candidate for the post.

In the July 2017 parliamentary election, he was re-elected to the National Assembly as the MAR candidate in Loango; he faced no opposition and won the seat in the first round with 100% of the vote. On 19 August 2017, when the National Assembly began meeting for its new term, Bouiti-Viaudo was elected as Second Vice-President of the National Assembly. He was the sole candidate for the post and received 142 votes from the deputies present. Jean François Kando was elected to succeed Bouiti-Viaudo as Mayor of Pointe-Noire on 24 August 2017.
