= Michel Bidimbou =

Congolese politician

Michel Bidimbou Pouela is a Congolese politician who has served as a Deputy in the National Assembly of Congo-Brazzaville since 2007.

== Political career ==
Bidimbou was elected as Secretary-General of the Union for the Republic (UR), a small pro-government party led by Benjamin Bounkoulou, at a party meeting in Nkayi in December 2006.

In the June–August 2007 parliamentary election, Bidimbou was elected to the National Assembly as the UR candidate in Kayes constituency, located in Bouenza Department. He received 51.83% of the vote. When the National Assembly began meeting for its new parliamentary term, Bidimbou was designated as Secretary of the National Assembly's Defense and Security Commission on 18 September 2007. However, the results of the election in Kayes were appealed to the Constitutional Court, and on 26 October 2007 the Constitutional Court overturned the results and ordered a new vote in the constituency. Bidimbou won the re-vote, which was held on 7 December 2007, receiving 55.43% of the vote against Pierre Ngaka, an independent candidate.

On 20 March 2011, strong winds damaged houses in Kiossi, a town in Bidimbou's constituency, leaving hundreds of people homeless and causing some injuries. Bidimbou subsequently appealed for help for the affected population, describing the situation in the town as "a humanitarian catastrophe".

Bidimbou left the UR and joined the ruling Congolese Labour Party (PCT) in 2011.

In the July–August 2012 parliamentary election, Bidimbou stood for re-election in Kayes, this time as a PCT candidate. In the first round of voting, he placed first with 24.16%, slightly ahead of Marc Makouanzi, an independent candidate, who received 22.66%. He prevailed in the second round of voting with 56.74% of the vote.
