= Edgard Diafouka-Bambela =

Congolese politician

Edgard Philippe Diafouka-Bambela (born 19 June 1947) is a Congolese politician who has been Prefect of Plateaux Department since 2012. A leading member of the Congolese Labour Party (PCT), he was Secretary-General of the Pool Department from 2003 to 2012.

== Political career ==
Diafouka-Bambela, born in Brazzaville in 1947, worked as a teacher. He joined the PCT in 1977.

At the PCT's Third Ordinary Congress, held on 27–31 July 1984, Diafouka-Bambela was elected to the 75-member PCT Central Committee.

Diafouka-Bambela was appointed as Secretary-General of the Pool Department on 30 October 2003. He was elected to the PCT Political Bureau in 2006.

In early 2011, Diafouka-Bambela was designated as First Vice-President of the Preparatory Committee for the PCT's Sixth Extraordinary Congress. At the Sixth Extraordinary Congress, held in July 2011, he was re-elected to the PCT's 51-member Political Bureau.

Diafouka-Bambela was appointed as Prefect of Plateaux Department on 5 January 2012, succeeding Claude-Maurice Malela Soba. He was installed in his post as Prefect by Raymond Mboulou, the Minister of the Interior, on 20 January 2012.
