= Pierre Ngolo =

Congolese politician (born 1954)

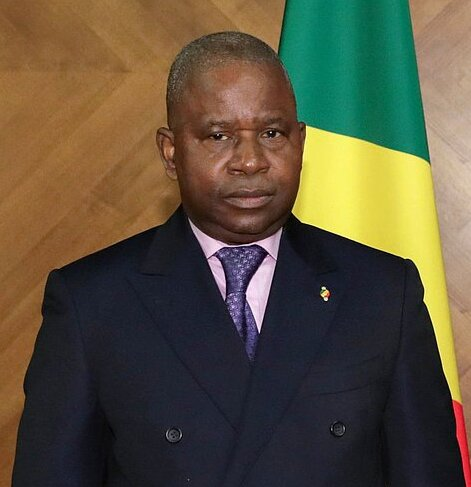
- Ngolo in 2023

President of the Senate of the Republic of the Congo
- Incumbent
- Assumed office 12 September 2017
- Preceded by: André Obami Itou

Secretary-General of the Congolese Party of Labor
- In office 25 August 2011 – December 2019
- President: Denis Sassou-Nguesso
- Preceded by: Isidore Mvouba
- Succeeded by: Pierre Moussa

Personal details
- Born: 27 June 1954 (age 71)
- Party: Congolese Party of Labour
- Education: University of Reims Champagne-Ardenne (MA)

Pierre Ngolo (born 27 June 1954) is a Congolese politician who has been Secretary-General of the Congolese Labour Party (PCT) since August 2011. He was First Secretary of the National Assembly of Congo-Brazzaville from 2002 to 2012. He has served as the President of the Senate of Congo-Brazzaville since 2017.

== Political career ==
Ngolo was born at Etoro, located in the Gamboma District of Plateaux Region. As a young man, he was active in the Congolese Socialist Youth Union, the PCT's youth wing. He attended the Marien Ngouabi University in Brazzaville, where he studied philosophy, and subsequently he continued his studies at Reims. Back in Congo-Brazzaville, he worked as a philosophy teacher.

Ngolo was included as one of the 75 members of the National Transitional Council (CNT), which served as a transitional legislature from 1998 to 2002, and was designated as First Secretary of the CNT. In the May–June 2002 parliamentary election, he was elected to the National Assembly as the PCT candidate in Ongogni constituency, winning the seat in the first round with 99.69% of the vote. After the election, he was chosen as First Secretary of the National Assembly on 10 August 2002. Ngolo was a delegate to the African Parliamentary Union's 27th conference, held at Algiers in November–December 2004; he headed Congo-Brazzaville's national group and was elected by the conference delegates as Rapporteur of the APU's Executive Bureau.

In the June–August 2007 parliamentary election, Jean-Claude Gakosso replaced Ngolo as the PCT candidate in Ongogni; although there were rumors of rivalry between the two, Gakosso and Ngollo appeared together when Gakosso announced his candidacy, and Ngolo instead stood as the PCT candidate in the Ouenzé I constituency of Brazzaville. Ngolo won the Ouenzé I seat in the first round with 54.30% of the vote, and he was subsequently re-elected as First Secretary of the National Assembly on 4 September 2007, receiving 122 votes from the 129 deputies who were present. He was additionally assigned responsibility for the National Assembly's relations with the African Parliamentary Union.

In light of the fact that Congolese President Denis Sassou Nguesso had been designated as President of the Economic and Monetary Community of Central African States (CEMAC), Ngolo was correspondingly elected as President of the CEMAC Inter-Parliamentary Commission at a session held in Malabo on 17–19 February 2010.

In early 2011, Ngolo was designated as First Rapporteur of the Preparatory Committee for the PCT's Sixth Extraordinary Congress. At the Sixth Extraordinary Congress, held in Brazzaville in July 2011, Ngolo was elected as Secretary-General of the PCT. His election as Secretary-General was considered surprising. It had been widely expected that the post would go to a more prominent figure, but Sassou Nguesso chose Ngolo, reportedly viewing him as a skilled organizer and as relatively uncontroversial. He was reportedly viewed as a "man of compromise": "an open conservative, anxious to preserve the identity of the party, while understanding the need for change".

A month after his election, Ngolo officially took office as PCT Secretary-General on 25 August 2011, succeeding Interim Secretary-General Isidore Mvouba.

Ngolo's constituency, the first constituency of Ouenzé, was among those areas of Brazzaville affected by the March 2012 explosions at a munitions dump, which killed hundreds of people. As a consequence, voting was not held in his constituency, as well as two other constituencies, at the time of the July–August 2012 parliamentary election. On 17 August 2012, the parliamentary terms of Ngolo and the other two deputies were extended by the Constitutional Court until such time as voting could be held. The ruling was in line with a constitutional provision allowing for such extensions when voting could not be properly held due to "exceptionally serious circumstances".

Under Ngolo's leadership, the PCT won a parliamentary majority in the 2012 election, the first time it had done so since the introduction of multiparty politics. Speaking to Jeune Afrique after the election, he argued that the state of the party had improved greatly in the preceding year. Prior to his election as Secretary-General, the party was suffering from "lethargy", according to Ngolo: "the party did not work, the rules were not observed". He also dismissed allegations of fraud from the opposition and said that the PCT was committed to "democratic pluralism". Reflecting on the events of the early 1990s, he credited the PCT and Denis Sassou Nguesso with the transition to multiparty politics and democratic elections, emphasizing that Sassou Nguesso had stepped down after his 1992 electoral defeat and did not try to "cling to power".

When the deputies met to elect the National Assembly's bureau for its new parliamentary term on 5 September 2012, Ngolo was not re-elected to his post as First Secretary of the National Assembly. He was officially succeeded by Gabriel Valère Eteka Yemet, who had been elected to replace him, at a handover ceremony on 11 September 2012. He continued to serve as a Deputy in the National Assembly, however. On 28 February 2014, he visited constituents in Ouenzé who were still suffering from the effects of the 2012 explosions, listening to their complaints about the lack of progress in reconstruction.

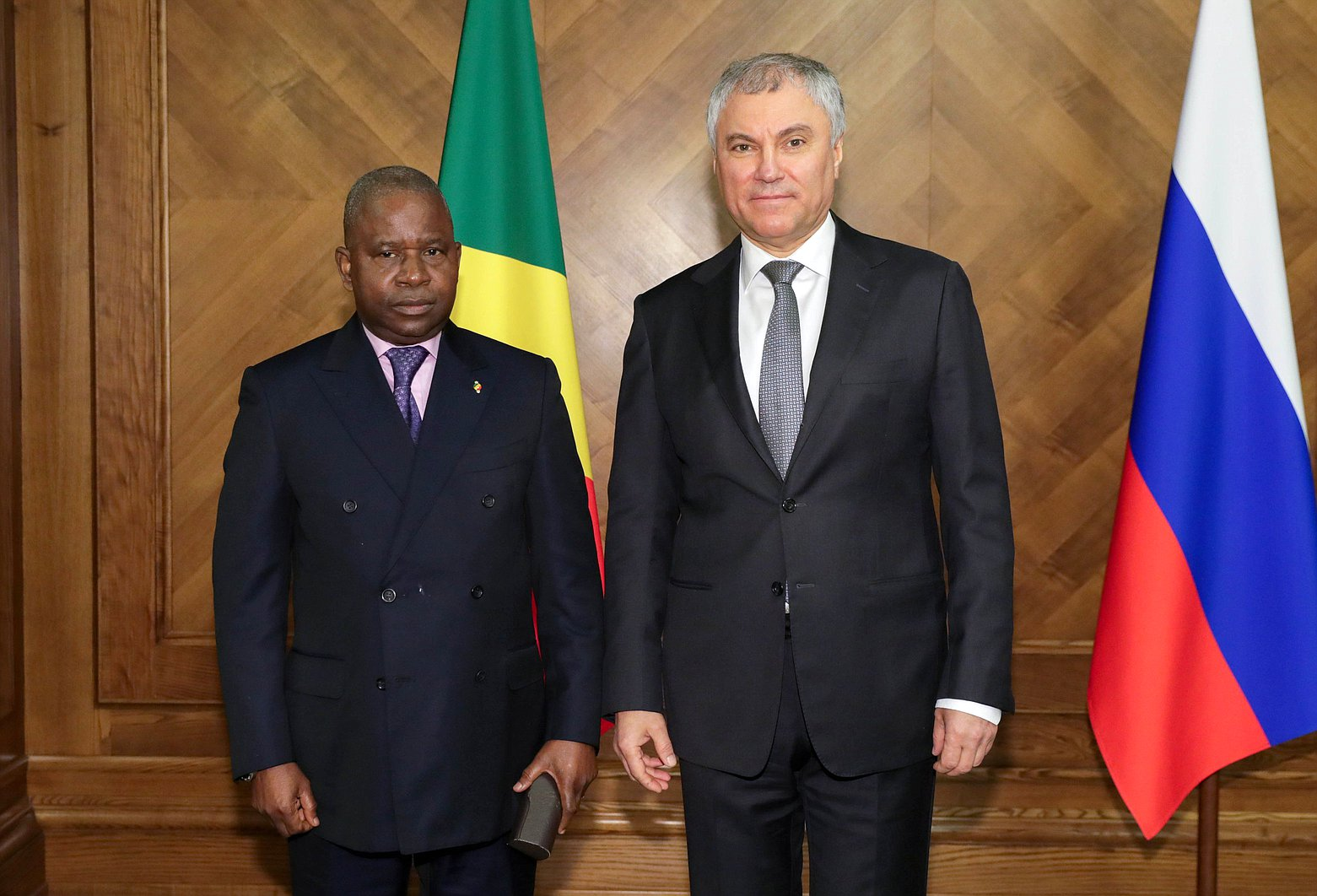
Vladimir Putin's close associate Vyacheslav Volodin and Pierre Ngolo at the “Russia-Africa” parliamentary conference in Moscow on 20 March 2023

He campaigned extensively to support the PCT's candidates in the September 2014 local elections, launching the campaign at Ouesso on 12 September and then going to Ongoni, Pointe-Noire, and Brazzaville. Afterward, other party leaders were sent out to campaign in the various departments while Ngolo focused on Brazzaville and Pool Department.

On 10 October 2015, speaking at a large rally in support of the October 2015 constitutional referendum in Brazzaville, Ngolo declared that "this human tide simply wants to say that changing the constitution is the will of the people, and as such no one can stop it." Although many in the opposition saw the referendum as merely a means of allowing Sassou Nguesso to remain in power, Ngolo argued that it was necessary to change the constitution "for the future of the country, to ensure peace and stability".

Ngolo confirmed on 25 April 2017 that he would stand for re-election as the PCT candidate in the first constituency of Ouenzé in the 2017 parliamentary election. However, the PCT chose not to renominate Ngolo to stand for another term. Meeting with constituents in June 2017, he urged them to vote for the new PCT candidate, who turned out to be Maixent Massa. However, in the indirect Senate election held on 31 August 2017, he was elected to the Senate as a PCT candidate in Brazzaville; he received 86 votes from the 101 councillors, more than any other candidate in Brazzaville.
