= Gabriel Valère Eteka Yemet =

Congolese politician

Gabriel Valère Eteka Yemet is a Congolese politician who was First Secretary of the National Assembly of Congo-Brazzaville from 2012 to 2017. Previously he was President of the Departmental Council of Likouala Department.

== Political career ==
During the 2000s, Eteka Yemet worked as Director of the Cabinet of the Minister of the Forest Economy, Henri Djombo. In the June–August 2007 parliamentary election, Eteka Yemet stood as the candidate of the Congolese Labour Party (PCT) in Liranga constituency, located in Likouala Region. He received 42.72% of the vote in the first round against 36.16% for Alexandre Koumou, an independent candidate. The two therefore faced one another in a second round of voting—held later than voting in the rest of the country due to the remoteness of Liranga—and Koumou, who was considered to be allied with the PCT despite standing as an independent candidate, won the seat.

Following the June 2008 local elections, he was elected as President of the Departmental Council of Likouala Department on 30 July 2008 as a candidate of the Rally of the Presidential Majority (RMP) coalition.

In the July–August 2012 parliamentary election, Eteka Yemet was elected to the National Assembly as the PCT candidate in Liranga constituency. He won the seat in the first round of voting, receiving 56.97% of the vote. When the National Assembly began sitting for its new parliamentary term, Eteka Yemet was elected as First Secretary of the National Assembly on 5 September 2012.

Eteka Yemet met with Cuba's Ambassador to Congo-Brazzaville, Alba Beatriz Soto Pimentel, on 14 November 2013 for a discussion about events in Cuba and parliamentary cooperation between the two countries.
