= Gustave Aba-Gandzion =

Congolese politician

- Occupation: Politician

Gustave Aba-Gandzion is a Congolese politician. A former gendarme, he became a member of the National Council of the Revolution (CNR, the governing military junta) in 1968. In 1972 he became a member of the Central Committee of the Congolese Party of Labour.
