= Marcel Moufouma-Okia =

Congolese politician

Marcel Moufouma-Okia is a Congolese politician. He has served in the Senate of Congo-Brazzaville since 2002.

During the 1970s, Moufouma-Okia was included on the Confederal Executive Committee of the Congolese Trade Union Confederation (CSC).

Moufouma-Okia was elected to the Central Committee of the Congolese Labour Party (PCT) at its Fourth Ordinary Congress, held on 26–31 July 1989. In July 2002, he was elected to the Senate as a PCT candidate in Lekoumou Region. When the Senate began meeting, he was designated as First Vice-President of the Senate's Commission for Education, Culture, Science and Technology, Health, Employment, and Social Affairs on 23 August 2002. He was re-elected to that post on 11 October 2005.

Standing for re-election as a candidate of the Rally of the Presidential Majority (RMP) coalition in Lekoumou Department, Moufouma-Okia again won a seat in the indirect August 2008 Senate election; he received 20 votes from the electors, thereby winning the last of Lekoumou's six available seats.

Following the October 2011 Senate election, Moufouma-Okia was re-elected as First Vice-President of the Senate's Education, Science, Culture, Information, and Technology Commission on 24 October 2011.
