= Raymond Mboulou =

Congolese politician

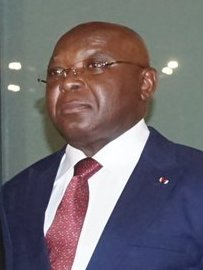
Raymond Mboulou in July 2016

Raymond Zéphirin Mboulou (born 19 March 1956) is a Congolese politician who has served in the government of Congo-Brazzaville as Minister of the Interior since December 2007. Previously, he was Secretary-General of the Presidency from May 2007 to December 2007.

== Political career ==
A member of the Mbochi ethnic group, Mboulou was born at Mpouya, located in the Plateaux Region of Congo-Brazzaville. He earned a degree from the Center for Financial, Economic and Banking Studies in Paris and became a state inspector in 1982; afterwards he held various other positions in the civil service over the years. In the 1992 parliamentary election and the 1993 parliamentary election, he was elected to the National Assembly as a candidate in Mpouya constituency.

After Denis Sassou Nguesso returned to power in October 1997, Mboulou served as Director-General of the Control of Markets and State Contracts from 1998 to 2002. In the May 2002 parliamentary election, he was again elected to the National Assembly as the candidate of the Congolese Labour Party (PCT) in Mpouya constituency; he won the seat in the first round with 80.15% of the vote. After the election, he was Head of the Cabinet of Aimé Emmanuel Yoka, the Director of the Presidential Cabinet, from 2002 to 2007.

Mboulou was then appointed as Secretary-General of the Presidency of the Republic, with the rank of Minister, on 15 May 2007. In the June–August 2007 parliamentary election, Mboulou was again elected to the National Assembly as the PCT candidate in Mpouya; he won the seat in the first round with 96% of the vote. After the election, he was appointed to the government as Minister of Territorial Administration and Decentralization on 30 December 2007.

As Minister of Territorial Administration, Mboulou announced the provisional results of the 12 July 2009 presidential election on 15 July 2009. Those results showed incumbent President Denis Sassou Nguesso winning another term with 78.61% of the vote; Mboulou also placed the turnout rate at 66%, although that was strongly contested by the opposition, which had boycotted the election and claimed that the turnout rate was anemic. Following the election, Sassou Nguesso retained Mboulou in the government as Minister of the Interior and Decentralization in a cabinet reshuffle on 15 September 2009.

Mboulou stood again as the PCT candidate for Mpouya constituency in the July–August 2012 parliamentary election; he again won the seat in the first round of voting. Following the second round of voting, he announced the results of the election on 7 August 2012 in his capacity as Minister of the Interior; according to those results, the PCT won a large majority of the seats in the National Assembly. Mboulou was retained in his post as Minister of the Interior and Decentralization in the post-election government named on 25 September 2012.

On 11 September 2014, a day before the beginning of campaigning for the 28 September 2014 local elections, Mboulou called for the campaign to proceed peacefully in a tolerant and respectful atmosphere.

Critics argued that Mboulou, as Minister of the Interior, played a key role in facilitating Sassou Nguesso's re-election in the March 2016 presidential election, restricting the activities of opposition candidates and ordering a communications blackout to prevent destabilization on election day and in the immediate aftermath of the vote. He announced the official results of the election, which showed a first-round victory for Sassou Nguesso, on 24 March 2016. Sassou Nguesso retained Mboulou in his post as Minister of the Interior, Decentralization and Local Development in the government named on 30 April 2016.

In the July 2017 parliamentary election, Mboulou stood unopposed as a candidate in Mpouya, with no other candidates standing in the constituency.

== Titles and awards ==
Mboulou is a Grand Officer of the Congolese Order of Merit.
