= Jean-Baptiste Tati Loutard =

Congolese politician and poet (1938–2009)

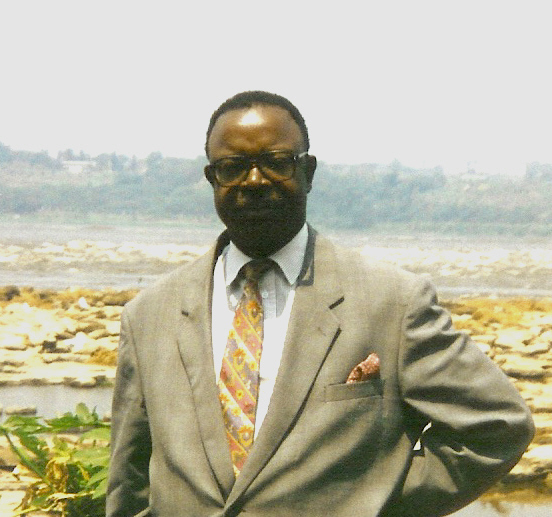
- Born: 15 December 1938; Pointe-Noire, Congo
- Died: 4 July 2009 (aged 70); Paris, France
- Occupation: Politician
- Writing career
- Period: 1968–2009
- Subject: Poetry
- Literary movement: the human condition

Jean-Baptiste Tati Loutard (15 December 1938 – 4 July 2009) was a Congolese politician and poet. Having previously served as Minister of Higher Education and Minister of Arts and Culture, he was Minister of Hydrocarbons in the government of Congo-Brazzaville from 1997 to 2009; he was also the founder and President of the Action Movement for Renewal (MAR), a political party. Aside from politics, Tati Loutard published numerous books of his own poetry and literature in general.

== Biography ==
Tati Loutard was born in 1938 in the coastal city of Pointe-Noire and attended the Chaminade High School and the Marianist school in Brazzaville the capital of the Congo. He obtained degrees in modern literature in 1964 and in Italian in 1964 at the University of Bordeaux. Tati Loutard returned to Brazzaville in 1966 to teach at the Centre for Graduate Studies. He published Poèmes de la Mer in 1968 and continued to publish regularly. His teaching career progressed and Tati-Loutard obtained the post of director of both the School of Humanities and the Center for Higher Education in Brazzaville.

=== Political career ===
Tati Loutard joined the Congolese cultural movement and became Minister of Higher Education in 1975; he was subsequently Minister of Culture and Arts from 1977 to 1991. He participated in the February–June 1991 National Conference as a representative of the government and was included on the National Conference's committee for the drafting of internal regulations. After a period teaching, he returned to the government after the June–October 1997 civil war as Minister of Hydrocarbons on 2 November 1997. He was promoted to the rank of Minister of State, while retaining the Hydrocarbons portfolio, on 7 January 2005.

In the 2002 parliamentary election, Tati Loutard was a candidate in Tchiamba-Nzassi constituency (located in Kouilou Region), but he was defeated in the first round by Bernard Mbassi of the Rally for Democracy and Social Progress (RDPS). Tati Loutard ran again in the 2007 parliamentary election, and this time he was elected to the National Assembly as the MAR candidate in Tchiamba-Nzassi, winning the seat in the first round with 52.54% of the vote. On 28 March 2008, he was elected as President of the Association of African Petroleum Producers (APPA) for the 2008–2009 period.

While still serving as Minister of State for Hydrocarbons, Tati Loutard was taken to Paris to be treated for an undisclosed illness in June 2009. He died in Paris on 4 July 2009 and the government announced his death "with deep sadness" on 5 July.

=== Literary career ===
In 1984 he was chosen with only two other poets, Tchicaya U Tam’si and Emmanuel Dongala to represent the poetry of his country in the Penguin Book of Modern African Poetry.

In 1986, Jean-Baptiste Tati Loutard was described as the "outstanding poet of his generation". Tati-Loutard won several awards for his works. He won the Prix des Lettres African Alioune Diop in 1982 for "New Congolese Chronicles" and the All Africa Okigbo Prize for Poetry in 1987 for "The Tradition of Dreams." In 1987, he also won the Black Africa Literary Grand Prix for "The Story of Death". He has also published short stories in Congolese Chronicles in 1974. The stories discuss issues such as cronyism, corruption, prostitution, unemployment and problems of immigration. In 1979, he published "New Congolese Chronicles" in which he analyzes the transfer of Congolese society after independence.

Tati-Loutard has received numerous awards for his writings. He won the Prix des Lettres African Alioune Diop in 1982 for "New Congolese Chronicles" and the All Africa Okigbo Prize for Poetry in 1987 for "The Tradition of Dream" and in 1987 he also won the Black Africa Literary Grand Prix for "The Story of Death".

== Published works ==
=== Poetry ===
- 1968 – Poèmes de la Mer, (Poems of the Sea)
- 1968 – Les Racines congolaises, (The Congolese Roots),
- 1970 – L’Envers du Soleil, (The Hidden face of the sun)
- 1974 – Les Normes du Temps, (The Standards of time)
- 1977 – Les Feux de la Planète,
- 1982 – Le Dialogue des Plateaux,
- 1985 – La Tradition du Songe, (The Tradition of Thinking), Paris
- 1992 – Le Serpent austral,
- 1996 – L’Ordre des Phénomènes,
- 1998 – Le Palmier-lyre,
- 1998 – (included in) The Penguin Book of Modern African Poetry
- 2007 – Oeuvres poétiques, Présence Africaine

=== Other publications ===
- 1976 – Anthologie de la littérature congolaise,
- 1977 – Les Feux de la planète,
- 1980 – Nouvelles chroniques Congolaises,
- 1987 – Le Récit de la mort, (The Story of Death)
- 1998 – Fantasmagories,
- 2003 – Nouvelle Anthologie de la littérature congolaise,

== Accolades ==
- 1987 – Prix pour la poésie Toute l'Afrique Okigbo, for La Tradition du Songe
- 1987 – Black African Literary Grand Prix for Le Récit de la Mort
- 1982 – Prix des Lettres Africaines Alioune Diop, for Nouvelles Chroniques Congolaises {New Congolese Chronicles}
- 1982 – Prix Simba, for l'ensemble de son oeuvre
