= Claude Alphonse Nsilou =

Republic of the Congo politician and architect (born 1954)

Minister of State for Trade, Supply and Consumption
- Incumbent
- Assumed office 22 August 2017

Minister of Construction, City Planning, and Housing in the government
- In office 30 December 2007 – TBD

Minister of Construction, City Planning, and Housing
- In office 3 March 2007 – TBD

Member of National Assembly
- Incumbent
- Assumed office June 2002

Minister of Equipment and Public Works
- In office 25 December 1992 – TBD

President of Citizen Rally (RC)
- Incumbent
- Assumed office March 1998

Claude Alphonse Nsilou (born 1954) is a Congolese politician who has served in the government of Congo-Brazzaville as Minister of Trade since 2017. Previously he was Minister of Construction, City Planning, and Housing from 2002 to 2017. He is the President of the Citizen Rally (RC).

== Political career ==
Nsilou, an architect by profession, was born in Brazzaville. He was the President and Director-General of Sifroid and was a member of the Congolese Movement for Democracy and Integral Development (MCDDI), led by Bernard Kolélas. In the power-sharing government of Prime Minister Claude Antoine Dacosta, Nsilou was appointed as Minister of Equipment and Public Works on 25 December 1992; this government served until a new parliamentary election was held in mid-1993. Nsilou later became President of the RC, supporting the January 2002 constitutional referendum and helping to direct President Denis Sassou Nguesso's campaign for the March 2002 presidential election.

Nsilou was elected to the National Assembly in the May–June 2002 parliamentary election as the RC candidate in the fifth constituency of Makélékélé (part of Brazzaville), winning the seat in a second round of voting. Following the election, he was appointed to the government as Minister of Construction, City Planning, Housing, and Land Reform on 18 August 2002; he succeeded Florent Ntsiba at the head of that ministry on 23 August. His portfolio was slightly reduced on 3 March 2007, when he was appointed as Minister of Construction, City Planning, and Housing.

In the June–August 2007 parliamentary election, Nsilou was again elected to the National Assembly as the RC candidate in the second constituency of Bacongo (part of Brazzaville); he was the only member of the RC to win a seat. After winning 43.13% of the vote in the first round, he faced MCDDI candidate Barthélémy Nkouka in the second round and prevailed. He was subsequently retained in his position as Minister of Construction, City Planning, and Housing in the government named on 30 December 2007.

Nsilou was moved to the post of Minister of State for Trade, Supply and Consumption on 22 August 2017.
