= Bonaventure Mizidy =

Bonaventure Mizidy was a candidate in the 2002 Republic of Congo Presidential election for the Republican and Liberal Party. He garnered 1% of the vote.
