= 1984 People's Republic of the Congo parliamentary election =

Parliamentary elections were held in the People's Republic of the Congo on 23 September 1984. The country was a one-party state at the time, with the Congolese Party of Labour as the sole legal party. As such, it won all 153 seats in the People's National Assembly, with a voter turnout of 94%.

Only 153 candidates were put forward for the election, of which 68 were party representatives, 55 were from mass organisations, 20 represented regions and Brazzaville and 10 were members of the armed forces.

== Results ==
Party	Votes	%	Seats	+/–
Congolese Party of Labour	853,168	100.00	153	0
Total	853,168	100.00	153	0
Valid votes	853,168	98.18		
Invalid/blank votes	15,822	1.82		
Total votes	868,990	100.00		
Registered voters/turnout	927,944	93.65		
Source: IPU
