= 1989 People's Republic of the Congo parliamentary election =

Parliamentary elections were held in the People's Republic of the Congo on 24 September 1989. The country was a one-party state at the time, with the Congolese Party of Labour (PCT) as the sole legal party. A list of 133 candidates for the 133 seats in the People's National Assembly was put to a vote, although not all members on the list were PCT members. The list received 870,460 votes against 29,897 spoilt ballot papers, with a voter turnout of 90%.

== Results ==
Party	Votes	%	Seats	+/–
Congolese Party of Labour	870,460	100.00	133	–20
Total	870,460	100.00	133	–20
Valid votes	870,460	96.68		
Invalid/blank votes	29,897	3.32		
Total votes	900,357	100.00		
Registered voters/turnout	1,004,320	89.65		
Source: Inter-Parliamentary Union
