= 1973 People's Republic of the Congo parliamentary election =

Parliamentary elections were held in the People's Republic of the Congo on 24 June 1973 alongside a constitutional referendum. The country was a one-party state at the time, with the Congolese Party of Labour as the sole legal party. As such, it won all 115 seats in the People's National Assembly. Voter turnout was 83%.

== Results ==
Party	Votes	%	Seats
Congolese Party of Labour	375,382	100.00	115
Total	375,382	100.00	115
Valid votes	375,382	68.16	
Invalid/blank votes	175,357	31.84	
Total votes	550,739	100.00	
Registered voters/turnout	662,098	83.18	
Source: Nohlen et al.
