= United Democratic Forces (Republic of the Congo) =

Former political alliance

The United Democratic Forces (Forces Démocratiques Unies) was an alliance of political parties in the Republic of the Congo, led by Denis Sassou-Nguesso. Sassou-Nguesso, presidential candidate of both the Congolese Labour Party and the FDU, won the presidential election of 10 March 2002 with 89.4% of the vote. In the parliamentary election held on 26 May and 20 June 2002, the FDU won 30 out of 153 seats.
