= Election law of the Republic of the Congo =

Congo’s electoral law was approved in 2001 and amended in 2007, 2012, 2014 and 2016. It aims to provide the conditions for a democratic and transparent electoral system, from campaigning and media access through voter registration, vote counting and certification.

Presidential and parliamentary elections take place under a two-round majority system. In presidential elections, this means that if no candidate reaches 50% in the first round, there is a second round 21 days afterwards, featuring the top two candidates. In parliamentary elections, each parliamentary seat is decided by a single-seat constituency vote, with a second round taking place if no candidate reaches 50% in a constituency.

Under Congolese electoral law, all adults over the age of 18 can vote (including those who are not yet 18 but will be at the time of the election).

An election campaign in the Republic of Congo begins 15 days before the vote. It finishes two days before the vote, at midnight (as elections are always on Sundays in Congo, this means that campaigning must cease Friday at midnight).

The electoral law regulates posters, election rallies, leaflets, the press and other media appearances. During the election period, equal space is given for the election posters of all candidates. Rallies are authorised but must be declared to the authorities 24 hours before taking place. In addition, on-screen time and access is provided in state broadcast media for all candidates. Civil servants are not allowed to engage in campaigning.

On voting day – which is from 7am to 6pm on Sundays (though it can be extended if there are more voters than anticipated) – all parties are entitled to have delegates at all polling stations. Vote counting involves an initial tally of the number of votes cast to ensure a match with the number of declared voters. Once this is completed, votes per candidate are counted. The votes are transmitted electronically to the electoral commission on the day, but it is not until the paper copies are received that the vote is certified and deemed official.

The preparation of elections is under the control of the interior ministry, which is in charge of voter rolls, receiving candidacies for elections, acquiring and distributing election materials. However, the organisation of elections is under the power of the electoral commission – formerly the National Commission for the Organisation of Elections (CONEL – Commission nationale d’organisation des élections) and now the Independent National Election Commission (CNEI – Commission nationale électorale indépendante).

The national electoral commission is in charge of verifying electoral rolls, ensuring the election campaign is without incident, collecting and assembling election results, and transmitting the results to the interior minister and Constitutional Court. It is made up of civil servants, members of political parties and civil society. Local electoral commissions have a similar composition and are supervised by the national commission.

== Recent changes ==
The most recent modification of the law came on January 14, 2016, with the creation of a new electoral commission, the Independent National Election Commission (CNEI – Commission nationale électorale indépendante). This replaced the National Commission for the Organisation of Elections (CONEL – Commission nationale d’organisation des élections). The CNEI is made up of members of both government and opposition parties, as well as civil society, and is set up to be independent and financially autonomous. Indeed, the new budget law assigns a specific budget line to the CNEI.

Ballot papers have also changed in line with demands by the opposition – moving to a single ballot paper. This limits opportunities to cheat by taking and using several ballots – as voters will now be given a single paper on which they will be asked to place one cross or tick.

While parties were already entitled to have representatives at all polling stations, their agreement in certifying the vote count is now mandatory. These changes have been noted by the opposition, which has welcomed progress made.

In addition, the election deposit has changed, meaning prospective candidates are required to pay a deposit of 25,000,000 CFA francs. This was reduced from initial proposals in parliament, on the grounds that more candidates should be able to run.

There will be new rules on state funding of political parties brought in after the elections.
