= Club 2002 – Party for the Unity and the Republic =

Political party in the Republic of the Congo

Club 2002 – Party for the Unity and the Republic Club 2002 - Parti pour l’Unité et la République
- Abbreviation: Club 2002-PUR
- Secretary-General: Juste Désiré Mondélé
- Founder: Wilfrid Nguesso
- Founded: 30 January 2002
- Ideology: Personalism
- Political position: Centre
- National Assembly: 2 / 151
- Senate: 1 / 72

Club 2002 – Party for the Unity and the Republic is a political party in the Republic of the Congo that is part of Denis Sassou Nguesso's presidential majority and is currently led by Juste Désiré Mondélé.

== History ==
The movement was founded on 30 January 2002, by Wilfrid Nguesso, a nephew of President Denis Sassou Nguesso. Initially the Club 2002 was a political association, but in 2007 it was transformed into a political party and "Party for the Unity and the Republic" was added to its name. On 17 July 2007, the Consensus for Change and Development, a political association, merged with the Club 2002, while the Organization for the Development of the Land of Alima Como Ndzaléitsé, another political association, became an affiliated association of the Club 2002.

In the parliamentary election held on 24 June and 5 August 2007, the party won 3 out of 137 seats.

Wilfrid Nguesso was a very religious man who was known to invoke his Christian faith during party meetings. At a meeting to mark Club 2002's 12th anniversary on 30 January 2014, Nguesso announced his decision to dissolve the party because he believed God wanted him to abandon politics and work as a pastor. At the urging of party members, Nguesso subsequently rescinded his decision, however. At Club 2002's first extraordinary congress, held on 16–17 May 2014, a new advisory body headed by Nguesso, the Supervisory Board, was created. Now heading an advisory body, Nguesso said that this enabled him "to reconcile my political responsibilities and my pastoral mission". At the congress, he peppered his words with religious invocations.

== Electoral history ==
=== National Assembly elections ===
Election	Party leader	Votes	%	Seats	+/–	Position	Result
2007	Wilfred Nguesso			3 / 137	New	▲6th	Coalition (PCT–MCDDI–MAR–MSD–Club 2002–AGIR–UPDP)
2012	Wilfred Nguesso			1 / 139	▼2	▼12th	Coalition (PCT-MCDDI-RDPS-MAR-UR-Club 2002)
2017	Juste Désiré Mondelé			1 / 151	0	▲10th	Coalition (PCT-MAR-RDSP-Club 2002)
2022	Juste Désiré Mondelé			2 / 151	▲1	▲6th	Coalition (PCT-MAR-Club 2002-RDPS)
