= Kingoué District =

Kingoué
- District
- Interactive map of Kingoué
- Country: Republic of the Congo
- Region: Bouenza Department

Area
  - Total: 609 sq mi (1,578 km^{2})

Population (2023 census)
  - Total: 14,399
  - Density: 23.63/sq mi (9.125/km^{2})
- Time zone: UTC+1 (GMT +1)

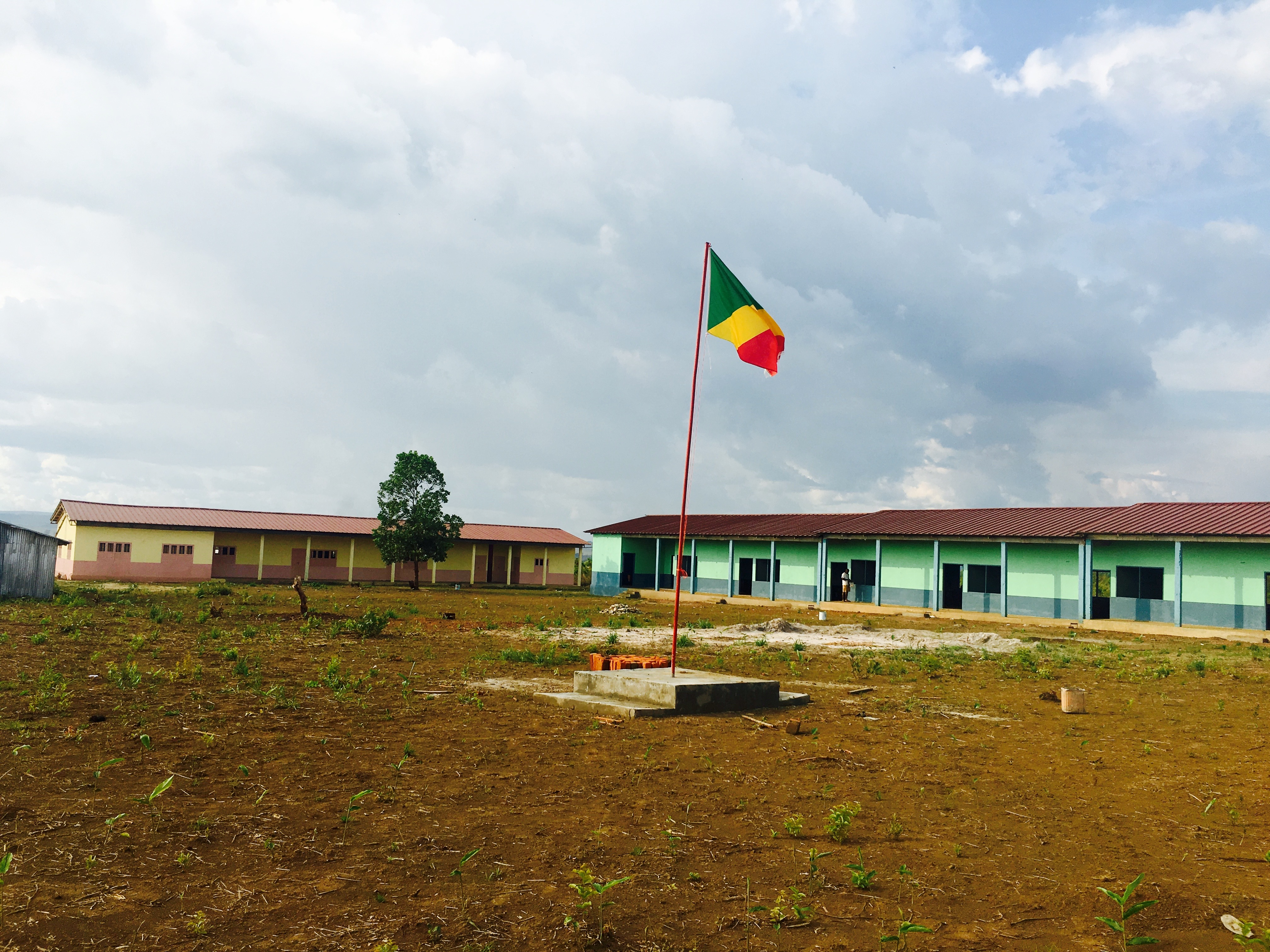
The Notre Dame du Bon Coeur School in Kingoué

Kingoué (can also be written as Kingue or Kingwe) is a district in the Bouenza Department of Republic of the Congo.
