= Mpouya =

Mpouya is a locality in the Republic of the Congo. It is located near the Congo river and is nearly 215 km (135 mi) far from the Congo's capital city, Brazzaville. Part of the Batéké Plateau runs through in Mpouya.
