= Movement for Solidarity and Development =

Political party in the Republic of the Congo

The Movement for Solidarity and Development (French: Mouvement pour la solidarité et le développement, MSD) is a political party in the Republic of the Congo. The MSD is led by Serge Blanchard Oba, who was Administrator-General of the Congo Telecommunications Company (SOTELCO) from 2003 to 2008.

== History ==
In the parliamentary election held on June 24 and August 5, 2007, the party won three out of 137 seats.

In the July–August 2012 parliamentary election, the MSD failed to win any seats.

After a difficult period in which the MSD lost many members, the party held its first extraordinary congress on 7 June 2014. According to Oba, the purpose of the congress was to highlight the party's survival. He stressed the party's continued support for President Denis Sassou Nguesso and said that the MSD would support the candidate of the presidential majority in the 2016 presidential election. Oba was also re-elected as President of the MSD.
