= 2009 Republic of the Congo presidential election =

- 12 July 2009
- Registered: 2,078,802
- Turnout: 66.42% (▼8.28pp)
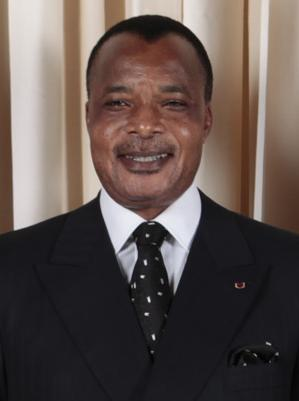

			PRL
Nominee	Denis Sassou-Nguesso	Joseph Kignoumbi Kia Mboungou	Nicéphore Fylla de Saint-Eudes
Party	PCT	Independent	PRL
Popular vote	1,055,117	100,181	93,749
Percentage	78.61%	7.46%	6.98%
President before election
Denis Sassou-Nguesso
PCT
Elected President
Denis Sassou-Nguesso
PCT

Presidential elections were held in the Republic of the Congo on 12 July 2009. Long-time President Denis Sassou Nguesso won another seven-year term with a large majority of the vote, but the elections were marred by accusations of irregularities and fraud from the opposition; six opposition candidates chose to boycott the elections.

== Background ==
In April 2009, a forum called Republican Dialogue was held to prepare for the election. A coalition of about 20 opposition parties called the United Front of Opposition Parties (FUPO) decided to boycott the forum. Pascal Tsaty-Mabiala, the Secretary-General of UPADS and spokesman for FUPO, condemned the preparations for the election, saying that "conditions such as transparency, the revision of lists, and respect for the opposition are not created for this election; it will be neither free nor transparent, and we will contest that."

Sassou Nguesso signed a decree on 8 May 2009 (which was announced on 11 May) setting the election date as 12 July 2009. The National Elections Organisation Committee (CONEL) oversaw the election; the opposition criticized it for allegedly favoring the government.

== Candidates ==
Ange Edouard Poungui, who was Prime Minister from 1984 to 1989, was chosen as the candidate of the largest opposition party, the Pan-African Union for Social Democracy (UPADS), while Mathias Dzon, who was Minister of Finance from 1997 to 2002, was chosen as the candidate of the Alliance for the Republic and Democracy (ARD), a coalition of opposition parties. The incumbent President, Denis Sassou Nguesso of the Congolese Party of Labour (PCT), was widely expected to run; he eventually announced his candidacy at a rally in Brazzaville on 6 June 2009.

On 23 February 2009, the formation of an alliance between the PCT and the opposition Rally for Democracy and Development (RDD) was announced. The parties agreed to present a single candidate in the 2009 presidential election, and the RDD agreed to join the government if their joint candidate (presumed to be Denis Sassou Nguesso) won the election.

Ange Edouard Poungui was chosen as the UPADS candidate by the party's National Council in a primary election on 30 November 2008. His sole rival for the nomination, Joseph Kignoumbi Kia Mboungou (who was the UPADS candidate in the 2002 presidential election), withdrew from the vote, complaining of "lack of transparency in the process", and Poungui, as the only candidate, received about 85% of the vote.

A total of 17 candidates submitted applications to run, and the Constitutional Court approved 13 of them on 18 June. Four candidacies were rejected: those of Poungui, Marcel Guitoukoulou, Rigobert Ngouolali, on the grounds that they had failed to establish their continuous residency in Congo-Brazzaville for at least two years, and that of UPADS dissident Christophe Moukoueke, on the grounds that he exceeded the 70-year age limit for candidates. UPADS spokesman Jean-Claude Ivouloungou denounced the exclusion of Poungui's candidacy and claimed that it was politically motivated, arguing that "over the last two years, all the candidates moved around, to visit family abroad, to fine-tune their plans". By rejecting Poungui's candidacy, the Constitutional Court's decision removed a key opposition candidate from the election and left Matthias Dzon as the main opposition candidate.

== Conduct ==
On 10 July, six candidates—Dzon, Guy Romain Kinfoussia, Clement Mierassa, Bonaventure Mizidy Bavoueza, Jean-Francois Tchibinda Kouangou, and Marion Matzimba Ehouango—called for the election to be delayed, claiming that the electoral lists were deeply flawed and included people who were not eligible to vote, as well as people who did not exist at all. At an opposition rally later on the same day, Dzon, Kinfoussia, Mierassa, and Bavoueza called for the people to boycott the election. Tchibinda Kouangou and Ehouango were not present at the rally, but Kinfoussia said that they also backed the call for a boycott. Dzon declared on the occasion that "for us, the election is not taking place on July 12 ... It will take place on the day the Congolese people are given a real choice."

Roger Bouka Owoko, the head of the Congolese Observatory for Human Rights (OCDH), criticized the electoral lists as "grotesque" on 11 July, saying that it was impossible that there could be so many people who were entitled to vote. Congo's population was estimated at about 3.6 million, and 2.2 million people were officially registered to vote; however, Bouka Owoko said that an extrapolation of statistics from other countries would predict only about 1.6 million registered voters in a population of 3.6 million.

Sassou Nguesso, who was expected to win the election easily in the absence of any serious competitors, cast his vote early in the day in northern Brazzaville. CONEL President Henri Bouka claimed a "massive vote in the interior" and said that, contrary to the opposition's claims, the electoral lists were "mostly honest".

The six boycotting candidates released a statement on election day asserting that over 90% of eligible voters had not participated in the election. According to the statement, "by this strong rate of abstention, the Congolese who love justice and peace have expressed their rejection of this totalitarian, arrogant and corrupt regime." The statement also urged "national and international opinion to acknowledge the illegitimacy of Denis Sassou Nguesso", and it called for the organization of a new election "with the agreement of all political forces in the country". Meanwhile, the news agency Agence France-Presse reported comments from heads of polling stations in which they described turnout as very low, and it quoted an election observer as stating that "there are more observers than voters."

Late on election day, Alain Akouala Atipault, the Minister of Communication, dismissed the opposition claims as "incorrect" and said that the presence of 170 international observers disproved the accusations of fraud. He dismissed the opposition's claim that turnout was less than 10% as "ludicrous", asserting that turnout was strong outside of Brazzaville. The African Union and the Economic Community of Central African States, both of which had observer teams present, endorsed the election as "regular, free and transparent" in a joint statement, and they praised the "calm and serene atmosphere" in which the campaign took place.

== Results ==
Provisional results were initially planned for release on 14 July, but Minister of Territorial Administration Raymond Mboulou announced that they would be delayed to 15 July because full results from some polling stations had not yet been received.

Mboulou announced the provisional results on 15 July. These results showed Denis Sassou Nguesso winning the election with 78.61% of the vote, while Joseph Kignoumbi Kia Mboungou (who had unsuccessfully sought the UPADS nomination and then ran as an independent) placed second with 7.46% and Liberal Republican Party candidate Nicephore Fylla de Saint-Eudes placed third with 6.98%. Having called on his supporters to boycott, Dzon received 2.30% of the vote. Mboulou said that voter turnout was 66.42%. Sassou Nguesso gave a victory speech at his campaign headquarters, declaring that "in peace, freedom and transparency, in the presence of international observers, you have with the 12 July vote renewed your confidence in me". He also said that the country was "not celebrating the victory of one faction over another, of one Congo over another Congo", but rather "the victory of democracy in peace and harmony".

Candidate	Party	Votes	%
Denis Sassou-Nguesso	PTC–RMP	1,055,117	78.61
Joseph Kignoumbi Kia Mboungou	Independent	100,181	7.46
Nicéphore Fylla de Saint-Eudes	Liberal Republican Party	93,749	6.98
Mathias Dzon	Alliance for the Republic and Democracy	30,861	2.30
Joseph Hondjuila Miokono	Independent	27,060	2.02
Guy Romain Kinfoussia	Independent	11,678	0.87
Jean François Tchibinda-Kouangou	Independent	5,475	0.41
Anguios Nganguia-Engambé	Independent	4,064	0.30
Ernest Bonaventure Mizidi Bavoueza	Independent	3,594	0.27
Clément Mierassa	Independent	3,305	0.25
Bertin Pandi-Ngouari	Independent	2,749	0.20
Marion Michel Mandzimba Ehouango	Independent	2,612	0.19
Jean Ebina	Independent	1,797	0.13
Total		1,342,242	100.00
Valid votes		1,342,242	97.22
Invalid/blank votes		38,409	2.78
Total votes		1,380,651	100.00
Registered voters/turnout		2,078,802	66.42
Source: African Elections Database

== Aftermath ==
Kignoumbi Kia Mboungou accepted the results; although he said there might have been shortcomings, he also noted the peaceful atmosphere that was maintained during the election. With regard to turnout, he said that the boycott might have affected it, as well as voter apathy. Kinfoussia, however, described the official turnout rate as "totally false". Ehouango also rejected the results and said that the opposition could potentially take the matter to the Constitutional Court, although he said that the Court was controlled by Sassou Nguesso. The OCDH claimed that turnout was no higher than 20%, and OCDH head Bouka Owoko argued that the low turnout called Sassou Nguesso's legitimacy into question.

At a news conference on 17 July, Dzon and four other candidates alleged that the official results were a fraudulent invention; on the same day, Herve Ambroise Malonga, acting as a lawyer for Dzon, filed an appeal at the Constitutional Court seeking the cancellation of the election on the grounds of alleged electoral fraud.

Kignoumbi Kia Mboungou met with Sassou Nguesso on 17 July; afterwards he said that they discussed how to move forward, improve government, and satisfy the wishes of the people, and he said that the people had expressed confidence in Sassou Nguesso through the election. Two minor independent candidates, Bertin Pandi Ngouari and Anguios Nganguia Engambé, recognized Sassou Nguesso's victory and congratulated him.

In a statement on 18 July, the Committee to Protect Journalists (CPJ) said that several international journalists had been mistreated by the police during an opposition protest on 15 July. Speaking for the government, Akouala Atipault denied this, saying that the international press was welcome; he observed that the journalists were present "at the heart of a demonstration where some material damage was caused. One might think that some unidentified individuals were behind these acts." He was also critical of the French-language media's coverage of the election, saying that it "seemed disappointed by the fact that this election took place in calm and serenity."

Reports published in the independent Congolese press after the election alleged that young men were observed in Brazzaville prior to election day with multiple voter cards, claiming that they intended to cast several votes each.

The Constitutional Court confirmed the results on 25 July, ruling that Sassou Nguesso had won the election with 78.61% of the vote (1,055,117 votes). Akouala Atipault said that Sassou Nguesso would be sworn in for his new term on 14 August 2009.

Sassou Nguesso was sworn in at a ceremony in Brazzaville on 14 August; various African leaders were present for the occasion. He said that his re-election meant continued "peace, stability and security", and he called for an end to "thinking like ... freeloaders" in reference to international aid received by the country. Sassou Nguesso also made an important announcement at his inauguration, saying that he would set in motion an amnesty bill to pardon Pascal Lissouba, who was President of Congo-Brazzaville from 1992 until being ousted by Sassou Nguesso in 1997; after Lissouba was ousted, he went into exile and was convicted of crimes in absentia. Sassou Nguesso said that he wanted the amnesty bill to be presented to Parliament by the end of 2009.
