= Senate (Republic of the Congo) =

Upper house of the Republic of Congo

Senate Sénat

Type
- Type: Upper house of the Parliament

History
- Founded: 1992; 34 years ago

Leadership
- President: Pierre Ngolo, PCT since 12 September 2017

Structure
- Seats: 72 members
- Political groups: PCT (52); RDPS (3); MAR (2); Club 2002 (2); UPADS (1); PRL (1); UDLC (1); MCDDI (1); LCEM (1); Independents (7)
- Length of term: 6 years

Elections
- Voting system: First-past-the-post
- Last election: 20 August 2023
- Next election: 2029

Meeting place
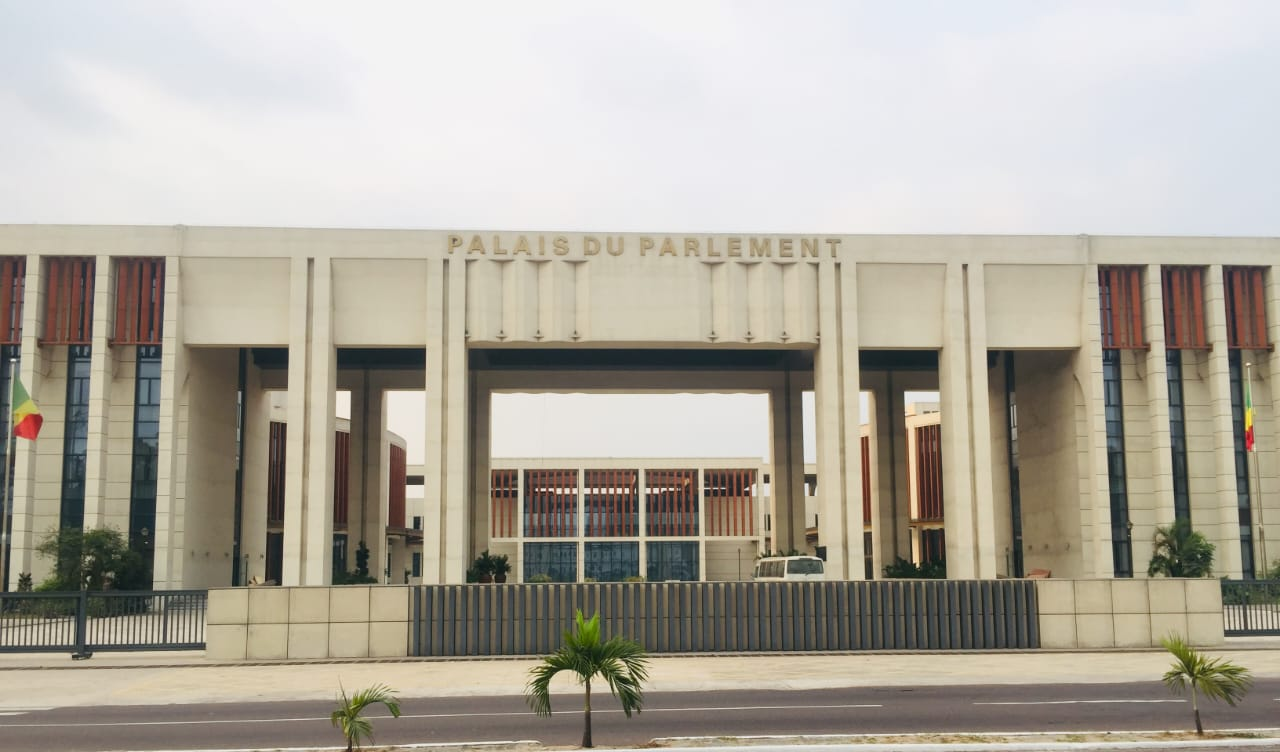
- Brazzaville

Website
- senat.cg

Constitution
- Constitution of the Republic of the Congo

The Senate (Sénat) is the upper house of the bicameral Parliament of the Republic of Congo (Parlement). It has 72 members (six for each of the 12 regions), elected for a six-year term by district, local and regional councils.

The Senate was established in 1992. Prior to the 2008 Senate election, it had 66 members; it was expanded to 72 members at that time to account for the creation of Pointe-Noire Region.

Senators serve terms of six years each.

== Notable people ==
- Alphonse-Mexil Etongo
- Marcel Moufouma-Okia

== See also ==
- List of presidents of the Senate of the Republic of the Congo
