= 2012 Republic of the Congo parliamentary election =

- 15 July 2012 (first round); 5 August 2012 (second round)
- All 139 seats in the National Assembly; 70 seats needed for a majority
Party	Leader	Seats	+/–
PCT	Denis Sassou Nguesso	89	+42
MCDDI	Guy Brice Parfait Kolélas	7	−4
UPADS	Pascal Tsaty Mabiala	7	−4
RDPS	Jean-Marc Thystère Tchicaya	5	+3
MAR	Roland Bouiti-Viaudo	4	−1
Citizen Rally	Claude Alphonse Nsilou	3	+2
UPDP	Auguste-Célestin Gongarad Nkoua	2	0
UR	Benjamin Bounkoulou	1	−1
Club 2002	Wilfred Nguesso	1	−2
Independents	—	12	−25
This lists parties that won seats. See the complete results below.
Results by department
President of the National Assembly before	President of the National Assembly after
Justin Koumba; PCT	Justin Koumba; PCT

Parliamentary elections were held in the Republic of the Congo on 15 July 2012. A second round was held on 5 August 2012. The second round was previously moved forward to 29 July, without explanation, but ultimately was held on the original date.

== Electoral system ==
The 139 seats in the National Assembly were elected in single-member constituencies. If no candidate received a majority of votes, a second round was held in that constituency, in which the candidate receiving the most votes was declared the winner. Candidates had to be at least 25 years old and have no criminal record.

Voting did not take place in three districts of Brazzaville, which had been affected by the death of 300 people after a munitions dump exploded in March.

== Campaign ==
The four main parties in the election were the Congolese Party of Labour (PCT) led by President Denis Sassou Nguesso, the Congolese Movement for Democracy and Integral Development, the Union for Democracy and the Republic and the Pan-African Union for Social Democracy (UPADS). Over 1,200 candidates registered to run in the election, including 124 women. The second round saw 140 candidates contest the remaining 70 seats.

== Results ==
The first round's result was announced on 20 July, in which 69 seats were won with a majority. The PCT won 57 of those 69 seats, while its allies won 10 seats; UPADS won one seat and one seat was won by an independent candidate. The PCT was particularly dominant in Sassou Nguesso's native Cuvette Region, where it won 11 seats. Notably, two children of President Sassou Nguesso won seats in the first round: Denis-Christel Sassou Nguesso won a seat in Cuvette Region, while Claudia Lembouma Sassou Nguesso won a seat in Brazzaville.

Second round results, announced on 7 August 2012, showed the PCT winning 32 of the remaining 67 seats, thus giving the party a parliamentary majority with 89 total seats. UPADS, the main opposition party, won seven total seats, while the MCDDI, a party allied to the PCT, also won seven total seats; independent candidates won 12 total seats. An assortment of smaller parties won the remaining seats, all of which were allied with the PCT. UPADS was the only opposition party to win seats.

The most important outcome of the election was the massive increase in seats for the PCT, which nearly doubled its share and obtained a comfortable majority. While the PCT, the party of President Sassou Nguesso, had previously been the most important party in the country, it had held only a plurality of seats and controlled the National Assembly in alliance with various smaller parties. The 2012 election made the PCT's dominance of the political scene unambiguous. The two other major parties, UPADS and the MCDDI, both lost seats, while independent candidates won less than a third as many seats as they had in the previous election.

136 seats in the National Assembly were filled in the election, with three seats still vacant due to voting not being held on schedule in three Brazzaville constituencies. In the latter three constituencies, Talangai 1, Talangai 2, and Ouenzé 1, which were affected by the March 2012 disaster, the three deputies elected to represent them in 2007—Hyacinthe Ingani, Jean-Claude Ibovi, and Pierre Ngolo—had their terms extended by the Constitutional Court in a ruling on 17 August 2012. The ruling was in line with a constitutional provision allowing for such extensions when voting could not be properly held due to "exceptionally serious circumstances".

Party	Seats	+/–
Congolese Party of Labour	89	+43
Congolese Movement for Democracy and Integral Development	7	–4
Pan-African Union for Social Democracy	7	–4
Rally for Democracy and Social Progress	5	+3
Action and Renewal Movement	4	–1
Citizen Rally	3	+2
Movement for Unity, Solidarity and Work	2	New
Patriotic Union for Democracy and Progress	2	0
Prospects and Realities Club	1	New
Union of Democratic Forces	1	0
Union for the Republic	1	–1
Club 2002 – Party for the Unity and the Republic	1	–2
Republican and Liberal Party	1	New
Independents	12	–25
Vacant	3	–
Total	139	+2
Source: IPU

== Aftermath ==
The bureau of the National Assembly, composed of seven members, was elected by the deputies on 5 September 2012; the PCT received five posts in the bureau, including all of the most important posts, while the MCDDI, an allied party, received one secondary post, and UPADS, the sole opposition party, also received one secondary post. Justin Koumba, who was President of the National Assembly during the 2007–2012 parliamentary term, was re-elected for another term; he was the only candidate for the post. Most of the other members of the bureau were changed. René Dambert Ndouane was elected as First Vice-President and Sylvestre Ossiala was elected as Second Vice-President. Gabriel Valère Eteka Yemet was elected as First Secretary, while Joseph Kignoumbi Kia Mboungou—a UPADS deputy, and the only opposition figure to be included in the bureau—was re-elected to his post as Second Secretary. Charlotte Opimbat was elected as First Quaestor and Joseph Badiabio, an MCDDI deputy, was elected as Second Quaestor.

On 19 September 2012, the heads of the National Assembly's seven standing committees were elected by acclamation. Three of the standing committees were chaired by PCT deputies, while deputies from UPADS, the Union for the Republic (UR), Action and Renewal Movement (MAR), and the Rally for Democracy and Social Progress (RDPS) chaired one standing committee each. Thus six of the committees were chaired by deputies from the majority parties and one by an opposition deputy.
