= Take Action for Congo =

Political party in the Republic of the Congo

Take Action for Congo (AGIR pour le Congo) is a political party in the Republic of the Congo.

In June 2007, four groups—the Alliance for Citizenship, Democracy and the Republic (led by Godfrey Mavoungou), the Study Circle of Nguimbi's Friends (led by Jean-Albert Nguimbi), the Moms for Peace in Kouilou (led by Alphonsine Ibehao), and the Mossendjo Development Association (led by Joseph Lolo)—agreed to merge with Take Action for Congo. In the parliamentary election held on June 24 and August 5, 2007, the party won three out of 137 seats.
