= Union for the Republic (Republic of the Congo) =

Political party in the Republic of the Congo

- President: Benjamin Bounkoulou
- Founded: 1995
- Split from: Pan-African Union for Social Democracy
- Headquarters: Brazzaville
- Ideology: Socialism
- Political position: Left-wing

The Union for the Republic (Union pour la République, UR) is a political party in the Republic of the Congo. It was founded on March 15, 1995, under the leadership of Benjamin Bounkoulou.

The UR was established by members of parliament who left the ruling Pan-African Union for Social Democracy (UPADS) and another party in January 1995, complaining of government favoritism towards people from Niari Region and Lékoumou Region at the expense of Bouenza Region, from which these members of parliament originated.

The UR is part of the presidential majority supporting President Denis Sassou Nguesso.

Michel Bidimbou was elected as the UR's Secretary-General in late 2006.

In the parliamentary election held on June 24 and August 5, 2007, the party won 1 out of 137 seats.
