= Union of Democratic Forces (Republic of the Congo) =

Political party in the Republic of the Congo

The Union of Democratic Forces (Union des Forces Démocratiques) is a political party in the Republic of the Congo, founded in 1991 by Charles David Ganao. In the parliamentary election held on June 24 and August 5, 2007, the party won 1 out of 137 seats.

The party is led by Josué Rodrigue Ngouonimba, Minister of Constructions since 2017.
