= Republican and Liberal Party =

Republican and Liberal Party Parti républicain libéral
- Abbreviation: PRL
- Founder: Nicéphore Fylla de Saint-Eudes
- Registered: 1991
- Ideology: Liberalism
- Colors: Blue
- National Assembly: 1 / 151

The Republican and Liberal Party (French: Parti républicain libéral) (PRL) is a political party of the Republic of the Congo, founded in 1991 by Nicéphore Fylla de Saint-Eudes.

The party participated in the 2002 presidential election with Bonaventure Mizidy, who came last out of 7 candidates, as well as in the 2009 presidential election, with his founding president Nicéphore Fylla de Saint-Eudes, who came 3rd out of 13 candidates.

Generally considered to be part of the moderate opposition to President Denis Sassou Nguesso, its position has become unclear since its founding president joined the government in 2016.

== History ==
The Liberal Republican Party (PRL) was founded in 1991 by Nicéphore Fylla de Saint-Eudes, during the "second democratic era" of Congo. It adopted several founding principles, including secularism, democracy, a controlled liberal economy, environmental protection and the reduction of inequalities.

The party fielded a candidate in the 2002 presidential election, Bonaventure Mizidy. He finished last out of seven candidates, with 1% of the vote. In 2009, its founding president, Fylla de Saint-Eudes, ran for president himself. He finished third out of thirteen candidates, with 6.98% of the vote.

Although a member of the moderate opposition to Denis Sassou-Nguesso, some Congolese have accused the PRL of having been created with the President's approval in order to divide the opposition votes during the elections.

In April 2016, Nicéphore Fylla de Saint-Eudes was appointed Minister of Technical and Vocational Education, Skills Training and Employment in the first Mouamba government. In July 2018, members of the opposition were asking him to clarify his position and that of his party. Paul Marie Mpouélé specifies in particular that "the presence of an opponent in the government obliges him to government solidarity. However, the opposition fights against the action of the government. One of its members can no longer be judge and party" , and recalls that the internal regulations of the Council of Political Parties stipulate that "any political party of the opposition which joins the government [...] loses the right to sit within the opposition".

== See also ==
- Politics of the Republic of the Congo
