= 2007 Republic of the Congo parliamentary election =

- 24 June 2007

All 137 seats in the National Assembly 69 seats needed for a majority
	First party	Second party	Third party
Leader	Denis Sassou Nguesso	Bernard Kolélas	Pascal Tsaty-Mabiala
Party	PCT	MCDDI	UPADS
Seats before	53	-	3
Seats won	47	11	11
Seat change	▼6	▲11	▲8

Parliamentary elections were held in the Republic of the Congo on 24 June 2007, with a second round initially planned for 22 July 2007, but then postponed to 5 August 2007. According to the National Commission of the Organization of the Elections (CONEL), 1,807 candidates stood in the first round for 137 seats in the National Assembly. The ruling Congolese Labour Party and parties and independent candidates allied with it won 125 seats, while two opposition parties won a combined 12 seats.

== Background ==
Jean-Pierre Thystère Tchicaya, the President of the National Assembly, and Justin Lekoundzou, the President of the Parliamentary Group of the Presidential Majority, sent a letter to President Denis Sassou Nguesso on 24 March 2007. In this letter, Lekoundzou and Thystère Tchicaya urged the establishment of an independent national electoral commission to oversee the 2007 parliamentary elections. Coming from two leading members of the Presidential Majority, the letter was a significant gesture of dissent, as it called into question the government's existing efforts to establish an independent electoral commission. In response to the letter, the deputies of the Presidential Majority, led by Alexandre Denguet Atiki, held a meeting in Mpila on 11 April to clarify that they did not endorse the letter. They criticized Lekoundzou and Thystère Tchicaya for acting outside of the parliamentary process and for making a statement that could be misinterpreted as reflecting the broader wishes of the deputies of the Presidential Majority, given their leadership roles.

In April the National Assembly approved a bill providing for the creation of an independent electoral commission, but it was not signed into law by Sassou Nguesso in time for the election; as a result, the election was conducted according to older legislation. The opposition criticized this, but it also criticized the bill passed in April on the grounds that the powers of the proposed electoral commission would be too limited.

== Campaign ==
On 23 April 2007, 42 groups of the presidential majority, supporting President Sassou Nguesso, signed an electoral agreement in Brazzaville providing for a common electoral strategy. Parties signing this agreement included Sassou Nguesso's party, the Congolese Labor Party (PCT), as well as Club 2002-Party for the Unity of the Republic, led by Wilfrid Nguesso, the Dynamic for Democracy and Social Progress (DDPS), led by Marcel Mbani, the Union for the Defense of Democracy (UDD), led by Pierre Damien Boussoukou-Boumba, the Republican Pole of Renovators (PRR), and the Party for the Safeguarding of Republican Values (PSVR), led by Michel Mampouya.

The PCT and the Congolese Movement for Democracy and Integral Development (MCDDI) of Bernard Kolélas signed an agreement on 24 April to form an alliance for the parliamentary election as well as subsequent local, senatorial, and presidential elections. This marked the official renewal of a previous alliance between the two parties in the early 1990s, which had lapsed later in the decade. A joint technical committee was to oversee the implementation of the agreement.

About 40 opposition parties chose to boycott the election, seeking a new, independent electoral commission and a later date for the election. Parties that said they would participate in the election included the Pan-African Union for Social Democracy (UPADS) of former President Pascal Lissouba and the Union for Democracy and the Republic (UDR-Mwinda) of former Prime Minister André Milongo. The Rally for Democracy and Development (RDD) also initially intended to participate, but later, in a statement on 8 June, said that it would not. Emmanuel Ngouolondélé Mongo of the Reflection for a New National Order and Ambroise Hervé Malonga of the Convention of Republicans called for a boycott on May 12, describing the election as a farce.

Despite signing an agreement with the government in late April, the National Council of Republicans (CNR), the party of former rebel leader Pasteur Ntumi, later announced that it would not participate in the election due to what it described as a lack of transparency. On 7 June Ntumi said that his party would participate, but on 19 June the CNR demanded that the government delay the election within two days or the party would boycott. It alleged that the organization of the election was not transparent and said that electoral rolls had not yet been posted and that voter cards had not yet been distributed. Ultimately the CNR participated in the election, putting forward six candidates, including Ntumi. The end of hostilities with Ntumi's "Ninja" rebels enabled the 2007 election to be held fully in the Pool Region; in the previous parliamentary election in 2002, voting did not take place in the eight of the 14 constituencies in the Pool Region due to the activities of Ntumi's rebel group.

Prior to the vote, the boycotting opposition appealed to the Constitutional Court regarding alleged electoral flaws, seeking to have the election cancelled, but on 22 June the Constitutional Court rejected this and ruled that only candidates could dispute the election.

Campaigning for the election began on June 8 and continued until 22 June. Although many voters did not receive their voter cards, Armand Baboutila, the Director-General of Electoral Affairs, assured them on June 20 that their voter cards would be available at the polling stations on election day.

== Conduct ==
In the first round of the election, held on 24 June, serious problems were reported, including the absence of electoral rolls and voter cards, or errors in them, in some places. Widespread delays were reported in the opening of polling stations, and turnout was said to be low. The electoral commission said that results would not be available for a week or more. The opposition denounced the election, with Ambroise Hervé Malonga, acting as spokesman for the boycotting opposition parties, calling it "chaos, not an election". The President of CONEL, Henri Bouka, acknowledged problems, but said that they were limited to Brazzaville and Pointe-Noire, the country's two main cities.

The observer missions of the African Union and the Economic Community of Central African States said in a joint statement on 26 June that, among other shortcomings, polling stations were opened late, electoral materials were often unavailable, voters were often not included on the voter rolls, and many voters did not receive voter registration cards. They also judged voter turnout to be very low. On the other hand, they said that voting was peaceful and without intimidation.

Minister for Territorial Administration François Ibovi suspended Baboutila, the Director-General of Electoral Affairs, on 28 June accusing him of negligence due to the problems in the election; Gaston Ololo was appointed in Baboutila's place for the second round. Opposition spokesman Malonga demanded on 29 June that the elections be annulled and that the government, and particularly Ibovi, resign. Malonga said that the suspension of Baboutila was insufficient and that Ibovi and the President of CONEL, Henri Bouka, should have resigned. Roger Bouka of the Congolese Observatory of Human Rights was also sharply critical of irregularities and the failure of voting to take place in some areas, calling for the election to be annulled.

A report by African Union observers said that there were major problems in the second round; among other things, it cited voter list errors, with some names absent and others listed more than once, and "incomplete distribution of the new voter registration cards". The report recommended a number of improvements in the organization of elections.

== Results ==
On 30 June results from the Ministry of Territorial Administration showed the ruling PCT winning 23 seats out of the 44 seats declared in the first round (21 in the north and two in the south). Another 12 seats went to its allies: four for the MCDDI, three for the Movement for Action and Revival, two for the Patriotic Union for Democracy and Progress, one for the Movement for Solidarity, one for the Club 2002 PUR, and one for To Act for Congo. Seven seats were won by independent candidates, who were considered to be allies of the ruling party, and two were won by the opposition UPADS. Joseph Kignoumbi Kia Mboungou, the President of the UPADS Parliamentary Group in the outgoing National Assembly, denounced the election as "faked" and said that the voter lists were "totally false".

Results for two additional seats were declared on 1 July: one for UPADS and one for an independent candidate.

On 8 July the election was held again in five districts due to the problems that plagued the first attempt. These districts were located in Niari Region, Plateaux Region, Cuvette Region, and Cuvette-Ouest Region. In 14 other districts, seven of them in Brazzaville and six in Pointe-Noire, the election was held again on July 15. CONEL President Henri Bouka described this vote as proceeding calmly and without incident.

UPADS Secretary-General Pascal Tsaty-Mabiala said on July 4 that the party would only participate in the second round of the election on July 22 if the electoral rolls were improved, voter registration cards were properly distributed, and the composition of the electoral commissions was changed. He also said that the second round should be delayed to allow time for these things to be done.

On 12 July President Sassou Nguesso stated that the second round would be postponed to a more appropriate date due to the necessary repetition of the first round in many districts. Ibovi announced on 19 July that the second round would be held on 5 August, with campaigning from 20 July to 3 August. He also announced the results of the first round revotes: the PCT and its allies won seven seats, while the opposition won none.

CONEL President Henri Bouka announced the publication of new voter registration cards on 1 August in an attempt to ensure that the second round would not be as marred by problems as the first round. He later said that the distribution of the cards would continue until 4 August and that those cards not distributed would be available in polling stations. Tsaty-Mabiala doubted that the election would be transparent and said that the UPADS did not understand why the new cards were being introduced. Malonga was also critical, saying that "the second round will be no different from the first". Observers expressed concern over the failure to post electoral lists in some districts.

The second round took place in 84 districts, with a total of 168 candidates. Reports indicated a low turnout and delays in the opening of polling stations. Bouka gave a positive appraisal of the vote, although there were reports of voters' names, some of whom had been able to vote in the first round, not being included on electoral lists. Joseph Kignoumbi Kia Mboungou of UPADS denounced the second round as fraudulent and accused the government of seeking to restore single-party rule. Malonga said that the second round was poorly organized.

According to results announced by Ibovi on 9 August, the PCT won a total of 44 seats, while its allies won a total of 80 seats, including the MCDDI with 12 seats. Opposition parties won a total of 11 seats, 10 for UPADS and one for the UDR. Two seats, for Bouaniela and Liranga districts, were not yet decided, because voting could not be held there on the date of the election. Tsaty-Mabiala denounced the results as fraudulent on 11 August and said that the election was neither transparent nor fair. He alleged that five UPADS candidates, in Mossendjo, Moutamba, Nkayi, Mabombo and Dolisie electoral districts, had won but were deprived of victory in the results. The party appealed to the Constitutional Court. On 13 August Ibovi announced a correction in the results for one of the electoral districts UPADS claimed to have won, Mabombo (in Bouenza Region), which had gone to Marcel Kalla in the previous results, but which Ibovi said was actually won by the UPADS candidate, Christophe Moukouéké, with 59.01% of the vote; the previously announced result was attributed to a clerical error. This raised the number of UPADS seats to 11.

In the two districts where voting was not held on 5 August, it took place on 19–20 August. On 24 August Ibovi announced that these seats were won by Raymond Ebonga and Alexandre Koumou, both independents who are considered to be allied with the PCT, thus bringing the total number of seats won by the ruling party and its allies to 125.

Party	First round			Second round			Total seats
Party	Votes	%	Seats	Votes	%	Seats	Total seats
Congolese Party of Labour			22			25	47
Congolese Movement for Democracy and Integral Development			4			7	11
Pan-African Union for Social Democracy			3			8	11
Action and Renewal Movement			3			2	5
Movement for Solidarity and Development			1			2	3
Club 2002 – Party for the Unity and the Republic			1			2	3
Take Action for Congo			1			2	3
New Democratic Forces			0			3	3
Patriotic Union for Democracy and Progress			0			2	2
Rally for Democracy and Social Progress			0			2	2
Union for the Republic			0			2	2
Union for Progress			0			2	2
Union for Democracy and the Republic			0			1	1
Union of Democratic Forces			0			1	1
Movement for Democracy and Progress			0			1	1
Youth in Movement			0			1	1
Citizen Rally			0			1	1
Life Party			0			1	1
Independents			8			29	37
Total			43			94	137
Source: Xinhua, Panapress, IPU, E-polytika, AngolaPress, Congopage

== Aftermath ==
The new National Assembly held its first session on 4 September, chaired by MCDDI President Bernard Kolélas, the oldest member, who won a seat from Goma Tsé-Tsé. Justin Koumba of the PCT was elected as the President of the National Assembly without opposition, receiving 121 votes from the 129 participating deputies. François Ibovi, the Minister of Territorial Administration, was elected as First Vice-President of the National Assembly, Bernard Tchibambelela of the MCDDI was elected as Second Vice-President, Pierre Ngolo of the PCT was elected as First Secretary, and Claudine Munari, an independent, was elected as Second Secretary. All of the seven members of the National Assembly's bureau were from the ruling majority, and six of them were elected without opposition. In the only contested election, a UPADS candidate received 12 votes against 115 for the ruling majority's candidate in the vote for the position of First Quaestor.

The heads of the seven permanent commissions in the National Assembly, as well as the heads of its three parliamentary groups, were elected later in September. Alexandre Dengué Atiki was chosen as the President of the Parliamentary Group of the PCT and the Presidential Majority, while Rodrigue Mouyéké was chosen as President of the MCDDI Parliamentary Group, which was allied with the Presidential Majority. Tsaty-Mabiala was chosen as President of the UPADS Parliamentary Group, which was the only opposition parliamentary group. Also in September, 12 elected deputies notified the National Assembly that they would not sit as deputies due to the incompatibility of that position with another position they already held, and would therefore be replaced by their substitutes. These 12 deputies included two presidential advisers (Laurent Tengo and Thierry Moungala) and ten ministers in the government (Lamyr Nguelé, Emile Mabondzo, Pierre-Michel Nguimbi, Henri Ossebi, Jean-Claude Gakosso, André Okombi Salissa, Martin Parfait Aimé Coussoud-Mavoungou, Jean-Baptiste Tati-Loutard, Bruno Itoua, and Jeanne Dambendzet).

On 28 September Tsaty-Mabiala criticized the failure of the Constitutional Court to issue decisions on appeals regarding the election despite the passage of the one-month period for examination of the appeals. He said that UPADS had submitted five appeals.

The Constitutional Court held public hearings beginning on 22 October, and on 26 October it annulled the results of four constituencies—Yamba (in Bouenza Department), where Raoul Mboungou Nzoumba, who was previously credited with victory, was to again face Clément Mouanda; Kayes (also in Bouenza Department), where Michel Bidimbou, the initial winner, was to again face Pierre Ngaka; Kibangou (in Niari Department), where Serge Victor Ignoumba, the initial winner, was to again face UDD President Pierre Damien Boussoukou-Boumba; and Mbomo (in Cuvette Ouest Department), where Jean Réné Matamaya, the initial winner, was to again face Léon Alfred Opimbat. There were a total of 22 candidates contesting the partial election: 16 of them in Kibangou, where the first round was held over again, and two in each of the other three constituencies, where the second round was being held over again. The Court rejected appeals for 15 other constituencies; these rejected appeals were from Jacques Mouanda Mpassi in Nkayi, Emmanuel Bongouanza in Mossendjo, Jean-Claude Adédé in Souanké, René-Dambert Ndouane in Sembé, Sylvain Ngambolo in Makotimpoko, Antoine de Saint Nicephore Eudes Fylla in Poto-Poto I, Mouyecket (Ngala Nicole Sylvie) in Tié-Tié II, Minister of Communication Alain Akoualat Atipault in Gamboma II, Julien Makoundi Tchibinda in Hinda I, Jean Moukoumbi in Moutamba, Pierre Malonga in Mbinda, Thomas Djolani in Boko, Solange Pauline Dendé Moudoki in Bétou, Jean Baptiste Nombo in Loandjili I, and Pierre Mabiala in Makabana.

The government announced on 15 November that the election would be repeated in these four constituencies on 7 December. On 15 November, Antoine Evoundou was appointed as Director-General of Electoral Affairs, replacing the suspended Baboutila. Campaigning began on 22 November and continued until December 5.

In Yamba and Kayes, the candidates of the PCT and the Union for the Republic (a party allied with the PCT) who were initially elected were confirmed, respectively, but in Mbomo, the initial winner from the MSD was beaten by Opimbat, the FDN candidate. A run-off was held in Kibangou on 26 December between the UDD candidate Pierre Damien Boussoukou-Boumba and Serge Victor Ignoumba, an independent. This final run-off was won by Ignoumba, who received 57.24% of the vote.
