= Citizen Rally (Republic of the Congo) =

Political party in the Republic of the Congo

The Citizen Rally (French: Rassemblement citoyen) is a political party in the Republic of the Congo. The party was founded in March 1998 and its President is Claude Alphonse Nsilou, who has served in the government since 2002.

In the parliamentary election held on June 24 and August 5, 2007, the party won one out of 137 seats. Nsilou, who won in the second constituency of Bacongo (part of Brazzaville), was the only member of the RC to win a seat.
