= Congolese Party of Labour =

Ruling party of the Republic of the Congo

Congolese Party of Labour Parti congolais du travail
- President: Denis Sassou Nguesso
- Secretary-General: Pierre Moussa
- Founder: Marien Ngouabi
- Founded: 29 December 1969 (56 years, 257 days)
- Preceded by: National Movement of the Revolution
- Headquarters: 5, rue Léon Jacob, Quartier Mpila, Brazzaville
- Paramilitary wing: Cobra Militia (1990s)
- Membership (2005): 250,000
- Ideology: Social democracy (since 2006); 1969–1992: Communism; Marxism–Leninism
- Political position: Centre-left; Historical: Far-left
- National affiliation: United Democratic Forces (from 2002)
- International affiliation: Socialist International (observer, from 2025)
- Colours: Red
- Senate: 52 / 72
- National Assembly: 112 / 151

Party flag

Website
- www.pct.cg

The Congolese Party of Labour (French: Parti congolais du travail, PCT) is the ruling party of the Republic of the Congo. Founded in 1969 by Marien Ngouabi, it was originally a pro-Soviet, Marxist–Leninist vanguard party which founded the People's Republic of the Congo. It took a more moderate left-wing stance following the dissolution of the Soviet Union in 1991 and adopted social democracy as its principal ideology in 2006. Denis Sassou Nguesso is the President of the PCT Central Committee, and Pierre Moussa is the Secretary-General of the PCT.

== One-party rule ==
The PCT was founded by President Marien Ngouabi on 29 December 1969, and was Congo-Brazzaville's sole ruling party from its inception. From the outset, it was heavily dominated by military officers from the sparsely populated north of Congo-Brazzaville. Although the PCT regime was designed as a Soviet-style socialist one-party state, it was essentially a military regime with a strongly ethno-regional character. Members of the southern ethnic groups, who were far more numerous than northerners, were included in the power structure, but the top leaders were consistently northerners.

Ideologically, the party represented a spectrum of Marxist–Leninist views and suffered from internecine struggles in the 1970s, which sometimes turned violent. Some leaders on the left wing of the party, such as Ange Diawara and Claude-Ernest Ndalla, favored a radical pro-Chinese position; they unsuccessfully attempted a coup d'etat against Ngouabi in February 1972. The right wing of the party, which was derided as having only a superficial commitment to Marxism–Leninism, was represented by Joachim Yhombi Opango; the 1972 plot was inspired by the left wing's loathing for Yhombi Opango.

Ngouabi was assassinated under unclear circumstances in March 1977 and succeeded by Yhombi Opango, whose opponents in the PCT were angered by his rightist deviationism and perceived marginalization of the party, and they ousted him in a February 1979 coup d'etat, installing Denis Sassou Nguesso—another career officer from the north—in power. The elevation of Sassou Nguesso, who represented the PCT's left-wing, marked a return to party orthodoxy. Sassou Nguesso was neither a radical leftist nor an ideologue; his policies were generally marked by pragmatism, and he sought warm relations with the West as well as the Eastern Bloc.

As Sassou Nguesso consolidated power, PCT factionalism was less pronounced during the 1980s, although internal power struggles continued. Jean-Pierre Thystère Tchicaya, a leftist ideologue who was one of the PCT's top-ranking leaders, was accused of organizing a bomb plot and removed from the leadership at the 1984 party congress. A powerful faction in the party, led by François-Xavier Katali, favored a hard-line pro-Soviet position; Sassou Nguesso was able to marginalize the Katali faction at the 1984 congress. Katali was demoted to a minor government ministry, but suffered no further punishment; when he died of a heart attack in 1986, he was considered a national hero.

Serious unrest in 1990 resulted in the collapse of the PCT regime. Sassou Nguesso was forced to introduce multi-party politics in 1990 and then call a National Conference in 1991. The National Conference saw severe criticism of Sassou Nguesso and repudiated PCT rule; it set up a non-PCT transitional government and reduced Sassou Nguesso to figurehead status.

== Multi-party era ==
The PCT was in opposition from 1992 to 1997, during the presidency of Pascal Lissouba. Although Marxist–Leninist ideology was abandoned, the party remained loyal to Sassou Nguesso and it continued to be dominated by key figures from the one-party era. Sassou Nguesso ultimately returned to power in the June–October 1997 civil war.

Denis Sassou Nguesso, presidential candidate of both the PCT and the United Democratic Forces coalition, won the March 2002 presidential election with 89.4% of the vote; there were no serious opposition candidates. The PCT won 53 out of 137 seats in the National Assembly in the May–June 2002 parliamentary election; together with smaller, allied parties, it held a parliamentary majority.

At the party's Fifth Extraordinary Congress in December 2006, Sassou-Nguesso was re-elected as President of the Central Committee of the PCT and Ambroise Noumazalaye was re-elected as Secretary-General of the PCT; the Central Committee elected at the 2006 congress included more than 500 members (there were previously less than 150 members), while the Political Bureau elected on the same occasion included more than 60 members and the Permanent Secretariat included 15 members. Social democracy was also adopted as the party's new principal ideology.

The political landscape in Congo-Brazzaville has been highly fractured since the early 1990s. In an effort to consolidate support for Sassou Nguesso, an initiative to "refound" the PCT as a broader party was attempted in 2006. Although backed by Secretary-General Noumazalaye, the effort encountered firm opposition from PCT "conservatives", led by Justin Lekoundzou, who wanted to preserve the PCT as a distinct party.

Noumazalaye died in November 2007, and Prime Minister Isidore Mvouba became Interim Secretary-General of the PCT.

In the parliamentary election held on 24 June and 5 August 2007, the PCT won 46 seats; although it was again the largest party, the fractionalization of the political landscape ensured that it fell well short of a parliamentary majority. The combined parties of the Presidential Majority supporting Sassou Nguesso won an overwhelming majority: 125 out of 137 seats. After the election, a large grouping of parties, including the PCT, was launched in December 2007: the Rally of the Presidential Majority (RMP). While the member parties of the RMP preserved their distinct identities, the grouping provided for some degree of consolidation and improved organization among Sassou Nguesso's supporters. In the 2008 local elections, the RMP parties ran joint candidate lists.

At the PCT's Sixth Extraordinary Congress, held in Brazzaville in July 2011, Pierre Ngolo was elected as Secretary-General of the PCT. His election as Secretary-General was considered surprising. It had been widely expected that the post would go to a more prominent figure, but Sassou Nguesso chose Ngolo, reportedly viewing him as a skilled organizer and as relatively uncontroversial. He was reportedly viewed as a "man of compromise": "an open conservative, anxious to preserve the identity of the party, while understanding the need for change".

In the July–August 2012 parliamentary election, the PCT won a parliamentary majority for the first time in the multiparty era, obtaining 89 out of 139 seats. The party has since remained the largest in the National Assembly, increasing its share of seats both in the 2017 and 2022 parliamentary elections.

== Membership ==
The party had about 70,000 members in 1990; by 2005, it had about 250,000 members.

== Election results ==
=== Presidential elections ===
Election	Party candidate	First round		Second round		Results
Election	Party candidate	Votes	%	Votes	%	Results
1992	Denis Sassou-Nguesso	131,346	16.75%	—		Lost ✗
2002	Denis Sassou-Nguesso	1,075,247	89.41%	—		Elected ✓
2009	Denis Sassou-Nguesso	1,055,117	78.61%	—		Elected ✓
2016	Denis Sassou-Nguesso	838,922	60.19%	—		Elected ✓
2021	Denis Sassou-Nguesso	1,539,725	88.40%	—		Elected ✓
2026	Denis Sassou-Nguesso	2,509,456	94.90%	—		Elected ✓

=== National Assembly elections ===
Election	Party leader	Votes	%	Seats	+/–	Position	Result
1973	Marien Ngouabi	375,382	100%	115 / 115	▲115	▲1st	Sole legal party
1979	Denis Sassou Nguesso	725,981	100%	153 / 153	▲38	1st	Sole legal party
1984	Denis Sassou Nguesso	853,168	100%	153 / 153	Steady	1st	Sole legal party
1989	Denis Sassou Nguesso	870,460	100%	133 / 133	▼20	1st	Sole legal party
1992	Denis Sassou Nguesso			18 / 125	▼115	▼3rd	Opposition
1993	Denis Sassou Nguesso			15 / 101	▼2	3rd	Opposition
2002	Denis Sassou Nguesso			53 / 137	▲38	▲1st	PCT–FDU coalition government
2007	Denis Sassou Nguesso			47 / 137	▼6	1st	PCT–Club 2002–MCDDI–MSD– UPDP–MAR–AGIR coalition government
2012	Denis Sassou Nguesso			89 / 139	▲42	1st	PCT-MCDDI-RDPS-MAR-RC- UFD-UR-Club 2002 coalition government
2017	Denis Sassou Nguesso			96 / 151	▲7	1st	PCT–MAR-RDPS-RC-PRL- Club 2002-UFD coalition government
2022	Denis Sassou Nguesso			112 / 151	▲16	1st	PCT–MAR-Club 2002–RDPS coalition government

== Notable members ==
- Benoît Bati
- Fernand Sabaye
