= 2002 Republic of the Congo parliamentary election =

Parliamentary elections were held in the Republic of the Congo in 2002; the first round was held on 26 May and the second round on 20 June. The Congolese Labour Party (PCT) and its allies won a majority of seats in the National Assembly.

== Campaign ==
A total of 1,239 people registered to stand as candidates in the election. On 11 May 2002, the Interior Ministry published the official list of candidates; 1,199 candidacies were validated, while 40 were rejected. The number of independents standing in the election was about equal to the number of party candidates. 51 candidates were elected in the first round. Twelve candidates were disqualified by the National Electoral Commission (CONEL) shortly after the first round due to various allegations, including fraud.

== Candidates ==
- Jean-Didace Médard Moussodia, won the seat in the second round of voting.

== Results ==
Voting was postponed in eight seats in the Pool Department due to militant activity.

Party	Seats	+/–
Congolese Party of Labour	53	+38
United Democratic Forces	30	New
Union for Democracy and the Republic	6	+4
Pan-African Union for Social Democracy	3	–44
Convention for Democracy and Salvation	2	New
Independents and other parties	35	–
Vacant	8	–
Total	137	+12
Source: African Elections Database
