= Auguste-Célestin Gongarad Nkoua =

Congolese politician

Auguste-Célestin Gongarad Nkoua is a Congolese politician and the President of the Patriotic Union for Democracy and Progress (UPDP), a political party. He served in the government of Congo-Brazzaville as Minister of Agriculture and Animal Husbandry from 1991 to 1992, as Minister of Water and Forests from 1992 to 1993, and again as Minister of Agriculture and Animal Husbandry from 1997 to 2002. Subsequently, he was President of the Economic and Social Council, a state institution, from 2003 to 2009. In 2009, he was appointed as President Denis Sassou Nguesso's Personal Representative for Political Affairs.

== Background and 1990s political career ==
An ethnic Téké, Gongarad Nkoua was a journalist and a printer by profession. Along with 300 others, he signed the petition of 7 July 1990, calling on President Denis Sassou Nguesso to convene a national conference for political reform. In the week that followed, the discovery of a plot—which was dubbed the "Téké plot" due to the ethnicity of the alleged conspirators—to oust Sassou Nguesso was announced, and Gongarad Nkoua was arrested, along with Clement Miérassa, who had also signed the petition.

The arrests followed a police search of Gongarad Nkoua's home, in which the police were said to have found "seditious documents" indicating that Gongarad Nkoua had been preparing a coup plot since November 1987. The government insisted that the arrests were based on involvement in a coup plot and were unrelated to the petition. However, Gongarad Nkoua spent only a few weeks in jail. In a gesture of clemency marking the 27th anniversary of the 1963 revolution, President Sassou Nguesso granted an amnesty to Gongarad Nkoua and other political prisoners on 14 August 1990.

Gongarad Nkoua was a delegate to the February–June 1991 National Conference, which established transitional institutions in preparation for multiparty elections in 1992. At the National Conference, he was one of four candidates for the post of First Vice-president of the Higher Council of the Republic (CSR), which was being set up as the legislature for the 1991–1992 transitional period. After two of the other candidates withdrew, Gongarad Nkoua faced Jean-Michel Bokamba-Yangouma in a third round of voting; he received 331 votes against 491 for Bokamba-Yangouma. Although the necessary quorum of delegates was not reached, Gongarad Nkoua chose to withdraw at that point in favor of Bokamba-Yangouma. He was instead given the post of Minister of Agriculture and Animal Husbandry in the transitional government of Prime Minister André Milongo, holding that post until 1992.

Leading his own political party, the UPDP, Gongarad Nkoua stood as a candidate in the August 1992 presidential election. He attracted little support, placing ninth with 0.69% of the vote. He received 6.3% of the vote in Plateaux Region, but in every other region his score was negligible. Subsequently, he and the UPDP supported Bernard Kolélas, the candidate of the Congolese Movement for Democracy and Integral Development (MCDDI), in the second round of the election, but Kolélas was defeated by Pascal Lissouba, the candidate of the Pan-African Union for Social Democracy (UPADS). The MCDDI, the UPDP, and five other parties then formed the Union for Democratic Renewal (URD) opposition coalition on 27 August 1992.

After Lissouba took office as president, the Congolese Labour Party (PCT), which had briefly supported him, defected to the opposition. Together with other URD leaders, Gongarad Nkoua signed an alliance between the URD and the PCT in September 1992. That alliance gave the URD and PCT a parliamentary majority, and consequently President Lissouba dissolved the National Assembly in November 1992. His decision provoked a political crisis that was resolved through the formation of an opposition-dominated power-sharing government, led by Prime Minister Claude Antoine Dacosta. In that government, which was appointed on 25 December 1992, Gongarad Nkoua was included as Minister of Water and Forests. The Dacosta government remained in office for six months; it was replaced by Lissouba following the early parliamentary election that was held in May–June 1993.

Lissouba was later ousted by rebel forces loyal to Sassou Nguesso at the end of the June–October 1997 civil war. As President, Sassou Nguesso appointed Gongarad Nkoua to the government as Minister of State for Agriculture and Animal Husbandry on 2 November 1997. After a little more than a year, Gongarad Nkoua was appointed as Minister of Agriculture and Animal Husbandry (without the rank of Minister of State) on 12 January 1999.

== Political career since 2000 ==
At the time of the January 2002 constitutional referendum, Gongarad Nkoua, who was still serving as Minister of Agriculture, headed the National Electoral Commission's operations for Ouenzé, the fifth arrondissement of Brazzaville. At a meeting in Ouenzé on 6 January 2002, he said that the new constitution was written with "past mistakes that led the country into a vicious cycle of tribal violence" in mind, and he urged the people to vote for it, saying that it would be conducive to good governance. He also stressed the importance of maintaining a peaceful atmosphere for the referendum.

Gongarad Nkoua supported Sassou Nguesso's candidacy in the March 2002 presidential election. Along with other important allies of Sassou Nguesso, he was included on the support committee for Sassou Nguesso's candidacy when it was publicly launched on 6 February 2002.

In the May 2002 parliamentary election, Gongarad Nkoua was elected to the National Assembly as the UPDP candidate in the Ngo constituency of Plateaux Region; he won the seat in the first round with 63.27% of the vote. After nearly five years in the government, he was dismissed from the government on 18 August 2002 and consequently sat as a Deputy in the National Assembly.

A year after Gongarad Nkoua's dismissal from the government, President Sassou Nguesso appointed him as President of the Economic and Social Council on 13 August 2003. The council, a constitutional state institution, is intended to provide advice to the government and the two houses of Parliament on economic, social, and cultural policy. Speaking at the council's inaugural session on 18 February 2004, Gongarad Nkoua told the other members of the Council that they "must participate effectively in the development of the nation's economic and social policy, advising the government in its decision-making to enable it to provide the people with better living conditions and the conditions of social peace." He also emphasized the importance of investment, saying that domestic economic activity should be encouraged and that Western countries should work with the council to facilitate development.

In the June 2007 parliamentary election, Gongarad Nkoua ran again as the UPDP candidate in Ngo constituency. Rally of Democratic Forces (RFD) candidate Joseph Miokono Hondjuila, who had won the seat in the 1992 parliamentary election, was considered Gongarad Nkoua's main competitor. Nevertheless, Gongarad Nkoua won an easy victory in the first round, receiving 86.16% of the vote. He remained allied to Sassou Nguesso and was one of many party leaders participating in the creation of the Rally for the Presidential Majority (RMP), a coalition of pro-Sassou Nguesso parties, on 20 December 2007.

On 18 September 2009, President Sassou Nguesso appointed Jean-Marie Tassoua, another long-time ally, to replace Gongarad Nkoua as President of the Economic and Social Council. He instead appointed Gongarad Nkoua as Personal Representative of the President for Political Affairs on the same day.

In the July–August 2012 parliamentary election, Gongarad Nkoua was re-elected to the National Assembly as the UPDP candidate in Ngo constituency. He won the seat in the second round of voting, receiving 56.46% of the vote against an independent candidate, Jean-Félix Nkoué. As the oldest deputy elected in the 2012 election, Gongarad Nkoua had the traditional honor of presiding over the National Assembly when it met on 5 September 2012 to elect its bureau for the new parliamentary term. Speaking on the occasion, he reflected on the role and the responsibilities of deputies: "As parliamentarians, you are the link between the local and the national level, between the national and the global level. ... When I look at this chamber, I always realize that behind every elected deputy there are thousands of Congolese. It is our honor to represent and respect everyone regardless of their vote and their political beliefs. Our mandate requires us to never lose touch with our fellow citizens."

Standing as a UPDP candidate, Gongarad Nkoua was elected as a local councillor in Ngo in the September 2014 local elections. He was defeated when standing for re-election in Ngo in the July 2017 parliamentary election; Elvis Digne Tsalissan Okombi won the seat in the first round with 60% of the vote.
