= Bernard Tchibambelela =

Congolese politician (1946–2025)

Bernard Tchibambéléla

Minister of Fisheries and Aquaculture
- In office 25 September 2012 – 30 April 2016
- President: Denis Sassou-Nguesso

Second Vice-President of the National Assembly
- In office 2007–2012

Member of the National Assembly for Mbanza-Ndounga
- In office 2007–2022

Vice-President of the National Assembly
- In office September 1992 – November 1992

Member of the National Assembly for Goma Tsé-Tsé
- In office 1992–2002

Director-General of Crédit rural du Congo
- In office 1982–1989

Personal details
- Born: Bernard Tchibambelela; 14 June 1946 Brazzaville, French Congo, French Equatorial Africa
- Died: 21 May 2025 (aged 78) Brazzaville, Republic of the Congo
- Party: Congolese Party of Labour (1989–1991); MCDDI (1991–2025)
- Occupation: Senior civil servant, economist, teacher, writer

Bernard Tchimbabelela (14 June 1946 – 21 May 2025) was a Congolese politician who served in the government of Congo-Brazzaville as Minister of Fishing and Aquaculture from 2012 to 2016. A member of the Congolese Movement for Democracy and Integral Development (MCDDI), he was first vice-president of the National Assembly of Congo-Brazzaville for a brief period in 1992, and he was second vice-president of the National Assembly from 2007 to 2012.

== Political career during the 1980s and 1990s ==
Tchibambelela, a member of the Lari ethnic group, was born in Brazzaville in 1956. He received degrees in economics, rural law, and agronomic engineering, and headed banks in Congo-Brazzaville and France. From 1982 to 1989, he was Director-General of the Bank of Rural Credit at the same time Director-General of CFCO(Chemin de fer Congo Ocean) in Congo-Brazzaville. During the single-party rule of the Congolese Labour Party (PCT), Tchibambelela was a member of the PCT; he was considered a protégé of Pierre Moussa, the Minister of Planning and Finance, and he was elected to the PCT Central Committee at the PCT's Fourth Ordinary Congress, held on 26–31 July 1989. Tchibambelela was Economic Adviser to President Denis Sassou Nguesso from 1989 to 1991. The PCT regime was forced to introduce multiparty politics in 1990, and Tchibambelela joined the MCDDI, a new party led by Bernard Kolélas, in 1991. The MCDDI drew its main support from members of the Lari ethnic group, like Tchibambelela, as well as the Bakongo, and it was the dominant party in the Pool Region.

In the June–July 1992 parliamentary election, Tchibambelela was elected to the National Assembly as the MCDDI candidate in the second constituency of Dolisie, in the Pool Region. After the election, the MCDDI and six other parties formed the Union for Democratic Renewal (URD), an opposition coalition, on 27 August 1992. The PCT—which had briefly formed an alliance with Pascal Lissouba and his Pan-African Union for Social Democracy (UPADS)—then defected to the opposition, and together the URD–PCT alliance held a parliamentary majority.

With its parliamentary majority, the URD–PCT alliance was able to elect the candidates of its choice to the top posts in the National Assembly. In the vote, held on 24 September 1992, the PCT's André Mouélé was elected as President of the National Assembly, while Tchibambelela was elected as its first vice-president. Tchibambelela held that position for only two months, however; President Lissouba was unwilling to cooperate with an opposition-controlled National Assembly and dissolved it on 17 November 1992.

President Lissouba's dissolution of the National Assembly necessitated a new parliamentary election, which was held in May–June 1993. Tchibambelela was re-elected to his seat from Goma Tsé-Tsé, but the URD–PCT alliance was narrowly defeated by the pro-Lissouba coalition. The opposition furiously contested the official results of the 1993 election, and serious political violence followed. Amidst the violence, Tchibambelela was vice-president of the ad hoc Parliamentary Commission for Peace. An agreement signed on 30 January 1994 facilitated a gradual return to peace.

Tchibambelela remained a Deputy in the National Assembly until October 1997, when rebel forces supporting Denis Sassou Nguesso captured Brazzaville and ousted Lissouba at the end of the 1997 civil war.

== Political career from 2007 ==
Tchibambelela, a member of the National Committee of the MCDDI, was elected to the National Assembly in the June 2007 parliamentary election as the MCDDI candidate in the Mbanza-Ndounga constituency of the Pool Region; he won the seat in the first round with 60.98% of the vote. On 4 September 2007, when the National Assembly held its first meeting of the new parliamentary term, he was elected as second vice-president of the National Assembly, receiving 120 votes from the 129 deputies who were present. He was additionally assigned responsibility for the National Assembly's relations with the Parliamentary Assembly of La Francophonie.

On 15 September 2007, the Association of Parliamentarians of the Pool was established with Tchibambelela as its president. In that capacity, he released a statement in early July 2009 affirming that all of the Pool's parliamentarians supported President Sassou Nguesso's bid for re-election in the July 2009 presidential election.

Tchibambelela published a book, Le Commerce mondial de la faim : stratégie de rupture positive au Congo-Brazzaville, through L'Harmattan in October 2009. The book discussed the problem of hunger in the developing world and Tchibambelela's ideas for solving the problem in Congo-Brazzaville.

Bernard Kolélas died in November 2009, and Tchibambelela was subsequently considered one of the main potential contenders for the party leadership, along with Kolélas' son Guy Brice Parfait Kolélas.

In the July–August 2012 parliamentary election, Tchibambelela was re-elected to the National Assembly as the MCDDI candidate in Mbanza-Ndounga constituency; he won the seat in the first round with 71.85% of the vote. However, when the deputies met to elect the members of the National Assembly's bureau for the new parliamentary term on 5 September 2012, Tchibambelela did not receive a post on the bureau. He was instead appointed to the government as Minister of Fishing and Aquaculture on 25 September 2012.

Following Sassou Nguesso's re-election in the March 2016 presidential election, Tchibambelela was dismissed from the government on 30 April 2016 and later on exiled in France with his family. He then returned to his seat in the National Assembly.

== Personal life and death ==
Mpaki Bernard was married to a successful businesswoman, Mrs. Jeanne, and together they have five children: their first son named Mpaki Corrad Bernard, born 8 November 1992; Mpaki Deesse; Mpaki Gorsset; Mpaki Dousse; and the Benjamin Mpaki Diverna, all born in Congo Brazzaville. He died on 21 May 2025, at the age of 78.
