= Clément Miérassa =

Congolese politician

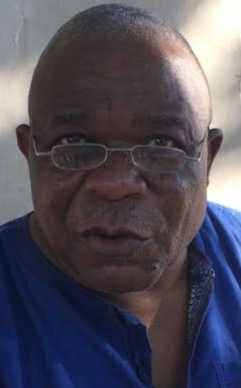
Clément Mierassa in 2016

Clément Miérassa (born 1949?) is a Congolese politician who has been President of the Congolese Social Democratic Party (PSDC) since 1990. He served in the government of Congo-Brazzaville as Minister of Trade from 1991 to 1992 and as Minister of Industrial Development from 1992 to 1993. Miérassa was also a minor candidate in the 1992 presidential election as well as the 2009 presidential election.

== Political career during the 1980s and 1990s ==
Miérassa, an economist and statistician by profession, is an ethnic Téké. During the single-party rule of the Congolese Labour Party (PCT), Miérassa was Director of the National Management Center (Centre national de gestion, Cenages). At the PCT congress held on 27–31 July 1984, he was included on the Secretariat of the PCT Central Committee as Secretary for Management and Economic Activities. He was the only Téké on the PCT Secretariat at the time, but he was removed from the body at a plenary session of the Central Committee on 24–30 November 1986, when it was decided to reduce the Secretariat from 11 to eight members.

Along with 300 others, Miérassa signed the petition of 7 July 1990, calling on President Denis Sassou Nguesso to convene a national conference for political reform. During the week that followed, the government announced that it had discovered a plot to oust Sassou Nguesso, and Miérassa was arrested, along with Auguste-Célestin Gongarad Nkoua, who had also signed the petition. The alleged coup plot was dubbed the "Téké plot" due to the ethnicity of the alleged conspirators. The government insisted that the arrests were based on involvement in a coup plot and were unrelated to the petition.

Miérassa spent only a few weeks in jail; on 14 August 1990, President Sassou Nguesso granted him an amnesty, along with other political prisoners, to mark the 27th anniversary of the 1963 revolution. He then openly opposed the PCT regime, founding a new political party, the PSDC. He applied to the Ministry of Territorial Administration for legal recognition of the PSDC on 30 September 1990. According to Miérassa, the PSDC was the fourth party (excluding the PCT) to register with the government.

At the conclusion of the February–June 1991 National Conference, Miérassa was appointed as Minister of Trade and Small and Medium-Sized Enterprises in the transitional government of Prime Minister André Milongo; he remained in that post until 1992.

Miérassa announced on 11 May 1992 that he would stand as the PSDC candidate in the August 1992 presidential election. He attracted little support in the election, placing tenth with 0.67% of the vote. He received 4.8% of the vote in Plateaux Department, but in every other part of the country his score was negligible. Subsequently, he and the PSDC supported Bernard Kolélas, the candidate of the Congolese Movement for Democracy and Integral Development (MCDDI), in the second round of the election, but Kolélas was defeated by Pascal Lissouba, the candidate of the Pan-African Union for Social Democracy (UPADS). The MCDDI, the PSDC, and five other parties then formed the Union for Democratic Renewal (URD) opposition coalition on 27 August 1992.

After Lissouba took office as President, the Congolese Labour Party (PCT), which had briefly supported him, defected to the opposition. Together, the URD and PCT controlled a majority of seats in the National Assembly, and they sought the appointment of Kolélas, the main opposition leader, as Prime Minister. Miérassa met with Lissouba on 9 November 1992 to request that he appoint Kolélas. However, Lissouba was unwilling to do so, preferring to instead dissolve the National Assembly later in November. His decision provoked a political crisis that was resolved through the formation of an opposition-dominated power-sharing government, led by Prime Minister Claude Antoine Dacosta. In Dacosta's government, which was appointed on 25 December 1992, Miérassa was included as Minister of Industrial Development, Fishing, and Crafts.

By assuaging the URD–PCT coalition, the Dacosta government was intended to stabilize the political situation and produce the appropriate conditions for the organization of an early parliamentary election, which was held in May 1993. Nevertheless, the election proved to be extremely controversial; the pro-Lissouba coalition officially prevailed in the first round of the election, leading the URD–PCT coalition to denounce the results as fraudulent and boycott the second round. On 10 June 1993, four days after the second round was held, Miérassa asked the Supreme Court to clarify legal issues surrounding the election. His query produced a favorable ruling from the Supreme Court, which judged that the release of the first round results and the organization of the second round were both illegal. Lissouba nevertheless appointed a new government based on his parliamentary majority, but the URD–PCT coalition refused to accept it. The controversy produced an extended period of political violence; although the second round was held over again on 3 October 1993, the violence continued well into 1994, and about 2,000 people were killed.

On 10 June 1997, a few days after the outbreak of the 1997 civil war, Miérassa was arrested by forces loyal to President Lissouba. He was reportedly tortured in the Diata section of Brazzaville and nearly executed before an order to the contrary arrived from higher command.

== Political career, 2000–2008 ==
Forces loyal to Sassou Nguesso prevailed in the civil war, ousting Lissouba in October 1997. Miérassa continued to lead his political party, the PSDC, in the years that followed. On 24 February 2007, the PSDC called for the establishment of an independent national electoral commission that would be fully empowered to oversee the June 2007 parliamentary election. It also called for electoral preparations to be conducted on a consensual basis, with the input of all parties, and it called for politicians to "reject the logic of war".

Miérassa participated in a meeting of opposition parties on 23 March 2007; at the meeting, the parties issued a statement in favor of the establishment of an independent and fully empowered electoral commission. Miérassa was designated to head a technical committee that was charged with collecting opinions on the idea from parties in the opposition as well as parties supporting Sassou Nguesso; those opinions were to be presented to the government for its consideration. Alongside other opposition leaders, Miérassa participated in a May 2007 opposition rally in Brazzaville demanding the creation of an independent electoral commission prior to the election and threatening to boycott the vote otherwise.

Continuing to press their demand for a new electoral commission, Miérassa and various other opposition leaders met on 25 May 2007 and called for the people to boycott the election if their demand was not met. They emphasized that a law updating the electoral code had already been passed by Parliament, but had not yet been promulgated by President Sassou Nguesso, and they criticized Sassou Nguesso for calling an election that would be held under the terms of an outdated law.

At the time of the June 2007 parliamentary election, Miérassa was President of the Collective of Parties and Political Associations of the Opposition and Center. Acting on his behalf, Ambroise Hervé Malonga brought a case before the Constitutional Court requesting that the Court annul Sassou Nguesso's decree calling the election on the grounds that it was unconstitutional. On 22 June 2007, two days prior to the election, the Court rejected the case.

Following the 2007 parliamentary election, the PSDC participated in the creation of an opposition coalition, the Alliance for Democracy and the Republic (ARD). Miérassa played a leading role in the ARD's creation; he chaired the opening session of the ARD National Coordination on 13 October 2007, and he was elected as President of the ARD. In the latter capacity, he held a press conference in mid-May 2008 together with the leader of another opposition coalition—Pascal Tsaty Mabiala of the Alliance for the New Republic (ARN)—to demand that the government withdraw a decree setting a date for the closure of nominations for the 2008 local elections. Miérassa and Tsaty Mabiala objected to the decree on the grounds that no date for the election had been set and political parties had not been consulted regarding the timetable. Miérassa, who accused the government of employing intimidation tactics, was careful to stress that they were not threatening violence and would only pursue "the legal means of protest" if their demand was ignored.

At a press conference in Brazzaville on 6 September 2008, Miérassa discussed a variety of topics; most importantly, he announced that he had resigned as President of the ARD. Reacting to critics who accused him of corruption, he said that he planned to take legal action against them. Miérassa also critically assessed Sassou Nguesso's state of the nation speech of 13 August. He again argued that Sassou Nguesso and his government were unwilling to engage in dialogue with the opposition and set up a truly independent electoral commission, and he argued that Sassou Nguesso's emphasis on "a grandiose list of so-called accomplishments" was deceptive: "It hides a reality, that of an extremely rich country whose citizens paradoxically sink in misery."

Later in September, Malonga dismissed Miérassa's resignation from ARD as unimportant, arguing that Miérassa was not present for the ARD's creation. The PSDC retorted that Miérassa had been actively involved with the ARD from the beginning, chairing meetings of the leadership, and it claimed that it was in fact Malonga who had been absent.

== Political activity since 2009 ==
In February 2009, together with 17 other opposition leaders, Miérassa signed an agreement on the creation of a front intended to defeat Sassou Nguesso and win the July 2009 presidential election. Miérassa was designated as the PSDC's candidate for the election. On 18 June 2009, the Constitutional Court validated his candidacy, along with the candidacies of 13 others. However, four candidates were rejected; among them was Ange-Edouard Poungui, the candidate of the Pan-African Union for Social Democracy (UPADS), Congo-Brazzaville's main opposition party. Poungui's candidacy was excluded on the grounds that he did not meet the constitutional requirement of two years' continuous residency in Congo-Brazzaville. Along with other leaders of the Front of Congolese Opposition Parties (FPOC), Miérassa denounced the Constitutional Court's decision to reject Poungui's candidacy.

On 10 July 2009, two days prior to the presidential election, Miérassa and five other candidates—Mathias Dzon, Guy Romain Kinfoussia, Bonaventure Mizidy Bavoueza, Jean-Francois Tchibinda Kouangou, and Marion Matzimba Ehouango—called for the election to be delayed, claiming that the electoral lists were deeply flawed and included people who were not eligible to vote, as well as people who did not exist at all. At an opposition rally later on the same day, Miérassa and the others called for the people to boycott the election. Dzon declared that "for us, the election is not taking place on 12 July ... It will take place on the day the Congolese people are given a real choice."

Provisional election results were announced on 15 July 2009, showing that Sassou Nguesso won the election with 78.61% of the vote, while voter turnout was placed at 66.42%; although Miérassa had called for a boycott, his name remained on the ballot and he placed tenth, receiving 0.25% of the vote. Miérassa and the other five boycotting candidates held a press conference on 17 July, at which they denounced the official turnout rate as absurd; they argued that the turnout was actually less than 10%, that the results had no credibility, and that Sassou Nguesso had no popular legitimacy. Miérassa, like four of the other boycotting candidates, appealed to the Constitutional Court, but it rejected his appeal, along with the others, on 25 July 2009.

Miérassa was elected to succeed Mathias Dzon as President of FPOC on 6 March 2010, in accordance with the coalition's internal regulations requiring the presidency to rotate every six months. Reacting to a call for greater participation by women in politics, Miérassa said on 27 March 2010 that women in the various parties should initiate discussions on the question of female participation. On the same occasion, he said that FPOC would participate in the 2012 parliamentary election, but only if it was preceded by an inclusive political dialogue establishing the proper conditions for the election.

On 20 April 2010, Miérassa and Pascal Tsaty Mabiala met with Jacques Banangandzala, the President of the Higher Council for the Freedom of Communication (CSLC), to express opposition complaints regarding the state media. Miérassa said that the state media did not give adequate coverage to opposition activities and stressed the need for the opposition's viewpoints to be represented in the state media if the country was to have "genuine democracy". Banangandzala replied to the concerns by saying that the law was fair, providing for the representation of political pluralism in the state media, and that it should be "applied rigorously". Miérassa, along with Malonga, then met with Bienvenu Okiemy, the Minister of Communication, on 22 April 2010. They told Okiemy that the state media did not give adequate coverage to the opposition and that the opposition's views were not correctly represented when it did receive coverage. Okiemy promised that the situation would be remedied.

After more than a year as President of FPOC, Miérassa was succeeded by Rigobert Ngouolali at the coalition's third national convention, which was held in Brazzaville on 9–10 April 2011. Miérassa was instead designated as Vice-President for Economic and Financial Issues.

Amidst discussion about the possibility of changing the constitution to enable Sassou Nguesso to run for another term, Miérassa said at a press conference on 18 February 2014 that the PSDC would argue against any change to the two-term limit. He also said that freedom of the press was not being fully respected, and he argued that the government was wasting money and not investing it properly, leaving the country poorer than it should be. On 3 August 2014, in the context of the ongoing constitutional debate, he alleged that Sassou Nguesso was violating his oath to uphold the existing constitution, which he said was "high treason".

In September 2025, Clément Mierassa denounced a new candidacy of Denis Sassou-Nguesso for the 2026 presidential election, and declared that it was "not in conformity with the constitution" and "should not be a candidate for the presidential election in 2026".
