= André Mouélé =

Congolese politician

Presidents of the National Assembly of Congo
- In office 24 September 1992 – 17 November 1992
- Preceded by: Ernest Kombo
- Succeeded by: André Milongo

André Mouélé is a Congolese politician. During the single-party rule of the Congolese Labour Party (PCT), he served in the government of Congo-Brazzaville as Minister of Culture, Arts, and Sports and as Minister of Labour and Justice in the 1970s. After the introduction of multiparty politics, he briefly served as President of the National Assembly of Congo-Brazzaville from September 1992 to November 1992.

== Political career during single-party rule ==
A native of Cuvette Department and a magistrate by profession, Mouélé was appointed as President of the Court of Appeal in Brazzaville in November 1969. President Marien Ngouabi subsequently appointed him to the government as Minister of Culture, Arts, and Sports on 30 August 1973. After a period out of the government, Mouélé was appointed as Minister of Labour and Justice on 18 November 1978, and he was elected to the PCT Central Committee at the PCT Extraordinary Congress held on 26–31 March 1979.

At the PCT's Third Ordinary Congress, held on 27–31 July 1984, Mouélé was re-elected to the 75-member PCT Central Committee. He also served as vice-president of the National People's Assembly.

== 1992–1993 events ==
Following the introduction of multiparty politics, Mouélé, who was a member of the PCT Political Bureau, was elected to the National Assembly as a PCT candidate in the June–July 1992 parliamentary election. The PCT was briefly allied with Pascal Lissouba and his party, the Pan-African Union for Social Democracy (UPADS), and it backed Lissouba in the second round of the August 1992 presidential election. However, after Lissouba won the election, he appointed only three PCT members to the government in September 1992; the PCT, believing it had been denied an appropriately proportional level of representation in the government, was infuriated. It promptly abandoned its alliance with UPADS and moved toward the creation of an alliance with the Union for Democratic Renewal (URD), a seven-party opposition coalition led by Bernard Kolélas.

The PCT's change in allegiance deprived President Lissouba of his parliamentary majority. Although Lissouba favored Ange-Edouard Poungui for the post of President of the National Assembly, he could not prevent the opposition from electing the candidate of its choice. In a parliamentary vote on 24 September 1992, Mouélé was elected as President of National Assembly through the combined votes of the PCT and the URD. He received 66 votes against 52 for Poungui; seven deputies cast blank votes. Although the PCT had been severely weakened by the events of the 1991–1992 transition, the election of Mouélé was a powerful reminder of the fact that it still had a key role to play in Congolese politics. The PCT and URD officially signed an alliance on 30 September.

With control of the National Assembly, the URD–PCT alliance pressed for the appointment of Bernard Kolélas as Prime Minister. Because President Lissouba was unwilling to appoint Kolélas, the URD–PCT alliance passed a vote of no-confidence against the government of Prime Minister Stéphane Maurice Bongho-Nouarra on 31 October 1992. The pro-Lissouba deputies were not present for the vote, and it was conducted by a show of hands. As a result of the vote, Bongho-Nouarra resigned on 11 November.

Under the circumstances, Lissouba had few viable options available under the constitution; still unwilling to appoint Kolélas, he chose to dissolve the National Assembly on 17 November, after it had been sitting for only two months. Enraged by Lissouba's decision, URD–PCT supporters reacted with violence in the streets of Brazzaville.

The political crisis precipitated by Lissouba's dissolution of the National Assembly was resolved through the formation of an opposition-dominated power-sharing government, led by Prime Minister Claude Antoine Dacosta. By assuaging the URD–PCT alliance, the Dacosta government was intended to stabilize the political situation and produce the appropriate conditions for the organization of an early parliamentary election, which was held in May 1993. Nevertheless, the election proved to be extremely controversial; the pro-Lissouba coalition officially prevailed in the first round of the election, leading the URD–PCT alliance to denounce the results as fraudulent and boycott the second round.

Violence renewed and intensified after the election. In June 1993, Lissouba appointed a new government based on his new parliamentary majority, but the URD–PCT alliance refused to accept it and created its own parallel government, while also setting up a parallel National Assembly. Mouélé was elected to head the opposition's National Assembly.

== Activities since 1997 ==
After Denis Sassou Nguesso returned to power in 1997, Mouélé worked in the state administration. He was the Central Director of State Procurements and Contracts as of 2006. Later, he was appointed as President of the Regulatory Council of the Regulatory Agency of Posts and Electronic Telecommunications on 30 December 2009.
