= Alphonse Nzoungou =

Alphonse Nzoungou (1938? – 7 September 2012) was a Congolese politician who served in the government of Congo-Brazzaville as Minister of Justice from 1989 to 1991 and as Minister of the Interior in 1992. Later, he was President of the National Commission for the Fight Against Corruption from 2007 to 2012.

== Political career ==
Nzoungou was a member of the Kongo ethnic group and a native of Boko, located in the Pool Department. As of 1973, he was working at the Ministry of Labour and Justice as Administrator of Labour Services as well as Technical Adviser and Head of the Planning Department. He was first appointed to the government as Minister of Justice, in charge of Administrative Reforms, on 13 August 1989. Nzoungou was also a member of the Central Committee of the Congolese Labour Party (PCT). Amidst the introduction of multiparty politics, he was retained as Minister of Justice in the government appointed on 14 January 1991.

The National Conference, which was held from February 1991 to June 1991, initiated a transition to multiparty elections, establishing a transitional government headed by Prime Minister André Milongo. Nzoungou was not initially included in the transitional government, but Milongo later appointed him as Minister of the Interior and Relations with the Higher Council of the Republic (CSR), on 21 May 1992, shortly before a parliamentary election and a presidential election were scheduled to be held.

The first round of the parliamentary election was held on 24 June 1992. The PCT, which performed poorly, called for the results to be annulled due to problems in the election, but Nzoungou did not accede to that demand. As Minister of the Interior, he announced the results of the second round of the parliamentary election on 23 July 1992.

In August 1992, following the second round of the presidential election, Nzoungou announced that Pascal Lissouba had prevailed over Bernard Kolélas, receiving 61% of the vote. After taking office as President, Lissouba retained Nzoungou in the government as Minister of Labour, Employment, and the Management of Human Resources on 6 September 1992. That government was short-lived, surviving only a few months before being brought down by its lack of parliamentary support. Later, Nzoungou was Secretary-General of the Government, with the rank of Minister, as of June 1997.

Considered a "neutral and respected figure", Nzoungou was assigned to lead a working group in February 2004 as part of the implementation of a peace agreement between the government and the Pool-based rebel group led by Frédéric Bintsamou. The purpose of the working group headed by Nzoungou was to "define the status of the rebel leader".

Later, Nzoungou was appointed as President of the National Commission of the Fight Against Corruption, a body tasked with the implementation of government anti-corruption policies, on 29 August 2007. The 16 members of the Commission were sworn in at a ceremony in Brazzaville on 9 November 2007.

On 9 December 2007, in a statement to mark the International Anti-Corruption Day, Nzoungou called for the Congolese people to battle corruption; echoing the words of President Denis Sassou Nguesso, he stressed that corruption was an obstacle to development.

Nzoungou remained in his post as President of the National Commission for the Fight Against Corruption until he died in Paris on 7 September 2012; he was 74 years old.
