= Jean-Martin Mbemba =

Congolese politician and lawyer

Jean-Martin Mbemba (born 13 August 1942) is a Congolese politician and lawyer. He is the President of the Union for Progress (UP) and has been a prominent politician in Congo-Brazzaville since the early 1990s. He served in the 1991–1992 transitional government as Minister of Justice; later, under President Denis Sassou Nguesso, he was Minister of Labour and Social Security from 1997 to 1999, Minister of Justice from 1999 to 2005, and Minister of State for the Civil Service and State Reform from 2005 to 2009. Since October 2009, he has been the President of the National Commission of Human Rights.

== Legal career ==
Mbemba, an ethnic Téké, was born in Brazzaville and studied in France. He was President of the Association of Congolese Students in France from December 1968 to December 1970, and he was President of the Federation of African Students in France from December 1971 to December 1972. He practiced as a lawyer in Brazzaville from February 1976 to June 1991. At the 1987 French trial of Klaus Barbie, a German war criminal of World War II, Mbemba was an assistant defense lawyer in the team headed by Jacques Verges. In the trial, the defense pursued a strategy of highlighting crimes committed by the West, including France itself, in hopes that Barbie's crimes during the German occupation of France would appear less offensive by comparison. Mbemba pointed to France's use of forced labour during the construction of the Congo-Ocean Railway in his own country, as well as France's violent suppression of the 1947 revolt against colonial rule in Madagascar; in addition, he denounced South African apartheid as "the ultimate crime against humanity". Following the trial, Mbemba was Secretary-General of the Union of Lawyers of Central Africa from September 1987 to June 1991.

== Political career ==
Mbemba has been President of the Union for Progress (UP), a political party, since its founding in October 1990. He participated in the 1991 National Conference and headed the committee for the drafting of internal regulations at the National Conference. At the end of the National Conference, he was appointed as Minister of Justice and Administrative Reform in the transitional government of Prime Minister André Milongo, serving in that post from June 1991 to June 1992. He was elected as a municipal councillor from the Fifth Arrondissement (Ouenzé) of Brazzaville in 1992, and soon afterward he was elected to the National Assembly in the 1992 parliamentary election as the UP candidate in the Ignié constituency of Pool Region. He also stood as the UP candidate in the August 1992 presidential election, placing 11th with 0.45% of the vote.

After his departure from Milongo's transitional government, Mbemba again practiced as a lawyer from July 1992 to October 1997, in addition to his political activities. In January 1993, following President Pascal Lissouba's dissolution of the National Assembly, Mbemba became President of the National Commission for the Organization of the Early Legislative Election. He was re-elected to the National Assembly as the UP candidate in Ignié constituency in the mid-1993 parliamentary election.

Following the June–October 1997 civil war, in which Lissouba was ousted, Mbemba was appointed as Minister of Labour and Social Security by President Denis Sassou Nguesso on 2 November 1997. In March 1998, "armed bandits" wounded Mbemba during an invasion of his home, while also killing a bodyguard and driver.

He was moved to the position of Minister of Justice on 12 January 1999. In the May 2002 parliamentary election, he was elected to the National Assembly as the UP candidate in Ignié constituency; he won the seat in the first round with 61.33% of the vote. Following that election, he remained Minister of Justice and was additionally assigned responsibility for human rights in the government appointed on 18 August 2002.

Mbemba served as Justice Minister until he was instead appointed as Minister of State for the Civil Service and State Reform on 7 January 2005. In the 2007 parliamentary election, he was again elected to the National Assembly as the UP candidate in Ignié constituency. He won the seat in the second round after receiving 39.17% of the vote in the first round against 37.84% for Carole Mantot, an independent candidate. He retained his post as Minister of State for the Civil Service and State Reform in the government appointed after the election, on 30 December 2007.

Mbemba and his party supported Sassou Nguesso when the latter ran for another term in the July 2009 presidential election. In the absence of any serious opposition candidates, Sassou Nguesso easily won re-election. Following the election, he appointed a new government, in which Mbemba was not included, on 15 September 2009. Sassou Nguesso instead appointed Mbemba as a member of the National Commission of Human Rights, a constitutional body, a few days later. Mbemba was then elected as President of the National Commission of Human Rights at a meeting held in the Palace of the Parliament in Brazzaville on 2 October 2009, and he took office on 7 October.

In 2013, Mbemba was investigated by the Directorate for Territorial Surveillance regarding allegations of "possession of weapons of war and attempted destabilization of national institutions". In protest, the UP announced on 19 June 2013 that it was suspending its participation in the Rally of the Presidential Majority (RMP) coalition.
