= Joseph Hondjuila Miokono =

Joseph Hondjuila Miokono is a Congolese politician. He served briefly in the government of Congo-Brazzaville as Minister of Trade during the 1990s and is the President of the Rally of Forces for Democracy (RFD), a political party.

== Life and career ==
Hondjuila Miokono, who belongs to the Teke ethnic group, was appointed as Director of the Congolese Sinking Fund (Caisse congolaise d'amortissement, CCA) in the mid-1980s; he remained in that post in the early 1990s.

In the June–July 1992 parliamentary election, Hondjuila Miokono was elected to the National Assembly of Congo-Brazzaville as a candidate in the Ngo constituency of Plateaux Region. He stood in the election as part of the National Alliance for Democracy (AND), a coalition that was dominated by Pascal Lissouba and Lissouba's party, the Pan-African Union for Social Democracy (UPADS).

President Lissouba appointed Hondjuila Miokono as Minister of Trade, Consumption, and Small and Medium-Sized Enterprises on 2 September 1996, as part of the government of Prime Minister David Charles Ganao. When Lissouba was ousted by rebel forces loyal to Denis Sassou Nguesso in October 1997, Hondjuila Miokono went into exile in Cotonou, the commercial capital of Benin.

Hondjuila Miokono is the President of the RFD, a political party that opposes President Denis Sassou Nguesso. Considered a moderate opposition leader, he and his party participated in the April 2009 dialogue regarding preparations for the July 2009 presidential election, unlike radical opposition parties, which refused to participate. However, he and another moderate opposition leader complained in June 2009 that preparations for the election were being hobbled by delays and that the government and electoral commission were undermining the agreements reached in the dialogue, and they threatened to withdraw from the election in protest.

Hondjuila Miokono stood as a candidate in the 2009 election, placing fifth with 2.02% of the vote; Sassou Nguesso controversially won re-election with a large majority of the vote.

Hondjuila Miokono was one of four opposition party leaders who participated in the founding of the Social Democratic Alliance of Congo on 22 February 2014. Along with the RFD, the alliance also included UPADS, the main opposition party.
