= Pascal Tsaty Mabiala =

Congolese politician

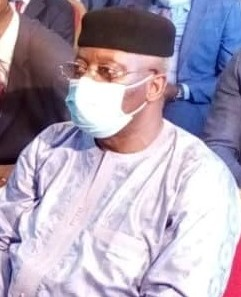
Tsaty Mabiala in 2020

Pascal Tsaty Mabiala is a Congolese politician who has been the Secretary-General of the Pan-African Union for Social Democracy (UPADS) since 2006, as well as President of the UPADS Parliamentary Group since 2007. He stood as the UPADS candidate in the 2016 presidential election.

== Political career ==
In the June–July 1992 parliamentary election, Tsaty Mabiala was elected to the National Assembly as a UPADS candidate. After the election, the Congolese Labour Party (PCT) formed an alliance with the Union for Democratic Renewal (URD), and together the two held a parliamentary majority. On 24 September 1992, the National Assembly, controlled by the URD–PCT alliance, elected its Bureau; UPADS, as part of the parliamentary opposition, received two secondary posts in the seven-member Bureau, one of which went to Tsaty Mabiala, who was elected as Second Secretary of the National Assembly.

Acting on behalf of UPADS, Tsaty Mabiala signed the Code of Good Conduct between political parties of the majority and the opposition on 31 May 1997. The Code of Good Conduct was an agreement to disavow political violence, although it proved to be entirely futile, as a civil war broke out a few days later.

Shortly after the outbreak of the civil war on 5 June 1997, Tsaty Mabiala was included on the National Mediation Committee. In September 1997, Tsaty Mabiala, who was a leading member of UPADS, was appointed as Minister of National Defense in the government of Bernard Kolélas; this government was ousted after only one month when forces loyal to Denis Sassou Nguesso captured Brazzaville in mid-October 1997.

In 2006, Tsaty Mabiala was First Vice-President of the National Preparatory Commission for the UPADS Congress. At the party's first extraordinary congress, held on 27–28 December 2006, Tsaty Mabiala was elected as the Secretary-General of UPADS. He was subsequently elected to the National Assembly in the June–August 2007 parliamentary election as the UPADS candidate in the Loudima constituency of Bouenza Region. Following that election, he became President of the UPADS Parliamentary Group when the National Assembly began meeting for the new parliamentary term in September 2007.

As of May 2008, Tsaty Mabiala was Interim President of the Alliance for the New Republic (ANR) opposition coalition.

Tsaty Mabiala, as spokesman for the United Front of Opposition Parties (FUPO), a coalition of about 20 opposition parties, condemned the preparations for the July 2009 presidential election, saying that "conditions such as transparency, the revision of lists, and respect for the opposition are not created for this election; it will be neither free nor transparent, and we will contest that."

Speaking in the National Assembly on 8 December 2009, Tsaty Mabiala argued that the government's anti-corruption campaigns were ineffective and that improved legislation to punish corruption was needed.

Speaking to journalists on 29 January 2011, Tsaty Mabiala called on the press to work independently of political pressure and play its part in the development of democracy. He offered a poor assessment of 2010, saying that it had been a year without improvement in the living standards of the Congolese people or progress in democratization across the continent. He also expressed disappointment in the continued predominance of neoliberalism as a global economic system.

In the July–August 2012 parliamentary election, he was re-elected to the National Assembly as the UPADS candidate in Loudima constituency. He won the seat in the second round of voting, receiving 62.48% of the vote against an independent candidate, Marcel Koussikina. On 2 November 2012, some UPADS leaders announced that Tsaty Mabiala was suspended from the party for alleged misconduct. Tsaty Mabiala in turn declared that the suspension was invalid.

Tsaty Mabiala responded to President Sassou Nguesso's new year's message on 31 December 2013 by saying that Sassou Nguesso needed to address the issue of changing the constitution to allow him to run for another term, something Sassou Nguesso had not mentioned in his message. He urged Sassou Nguesso to quiet the ongoing debate, initiated by the ruling PCT, by affirming that he would not stand again as a presidential candidate in 2016.

In the National Assembly on 25 April 2014, Tsaty Mabiala asked the Minister of Justice, Aimé Emmanuel Yoka, a question in which he claimed that it was an "open secret" that Sassou Nguesso wanted the constitution to be changed to enable him to run for another term. Alleging that the goal was being pursued through "shameless manipulation", Tsaty-Mabiala argued that the government should hold a national dialogue on the matter. Yoka replied that such a dialogue would be unnecessary and that it would be simpler for Parliament to debate the constitution, and he accordingly asked Justin Koumba, the President of the National Assembly, to initiate a parliamentary debate on the matter.

At a special session of the UPADS National Council on 30–31 January 2016, Tsaty Mabiala was unanimously approved as the party's candidate for the March 2016 presidential election.

In the July 2017 parliamentary election, he was re-elected to the National Assembly as the UPADS candidate in Loudima, winning the seat in the first round with 60% of the vote.
