= Stéphane Maurice Bongho-Nouarra =

Prime Minister of the Republic of the Congo

Prime Minister of the Republic of the Congo
- In office 2 September 1992 – 6 December 1992
- President: Pascal Lissouba
- Preceded by: André Milongo
- Succeeded by: Claude Antoine Dacosta

Personal details
- Born: June 6, 1937 Ouesso, French Equatorial Africa
- Died: October 7, 2007 (aged 70) Brussels, Belgium
- Party: Pan-African Union for Social Democracy
- Occupation: Business executive

Stéphane Maurice Bongho-Nouarra (June 6, 1937 – October 7, 2007) was a Congolese politician. He served in the government of Congo-Brazzaville during the late 1960s, and after a period in exile, he returned and played an important role in the politics of the 1990s. Bongho-Nouarra was briefly Prime Minister of Congo-Brazzaville from September 1992 to December 1992.

== Early life and education ==
Bongho-Nourra was born on June 6, 1937, in Ouésso. He attended primary school in Brazzaville and Owando (then Fort Rousset) and received his certificate of elementary education on June 14, 1949. After attending high school, where he was sixth in his class, he entered military school in Brazzaville on October 1, 1951, remaining there until 1954. Subsequently, he studied in France; after completing his education, he returned to Congo-Brazzaville in 1963.

== Political career ==
Back in Congo, Bongho-Nouarra was head of the agricultural engineering subdivision in Pointe-Noire, then regional director of the first agricultural region. He became President of the Junior Chamber International in Congo and was elected as Vice-President of the Junior Chamber International at its congress in Oklahoma City. He was also President of the Congolese Olympic Committee. After serving as President of the Economic and Social Council from 1964 to 1965, he was appointed as Secretary of State at the Presidency of the Republic, in charge of Agriculture, Animal Husbandry, Water, and Forests, by President Alphonse Massamba-Débat in 1966.

Bongho-Nouarra became Minister of Agriculture in January 1968 and was subsequently appointed as Minister of Public Works, Housing, and Transport in the government named on January 1, 1969. Soon afterwards, however, he was dismissed from the government by President Marien Ngouabi due to political differences of opinion. He instead took an administrative post at an agricultural school, but in August 1970 he was accused of complicity in an anti-government plot, and he was sentenced to ten years in prison. While in prison, he was tortured, and he was released in 1971 due to poor health. He went into exile in France, where he recovered his health and became a consultant to a number of French and Swiss companies. As a businessman, he returned to Congo-Brazzaville in 1977, but left under pressure and remained in exile in France until 1990.

Returning to Congo-Brazzaville with the introduction of multiparty politics in 1990, Bongho-Nouarra became Honorary President of the Party for the Reconstruction and Development of the Congo (PRDC). He was elected as the Second Vice-President of the 1991 National Conference, which marked the beginning of the transition to multiparty elections. In the 1992 parliamentary election, he was elected to the National Assembly from the Mbama constituency in Cuvette-Ouest Region. At that time, he was the National Coordinator of the National Alliance for Democracy (AND), a coalition of parties that backed Pan-African Union for Social Democracy (UPADS) candidate Pascal Lissouba in the first round of the August 1992 presidential election. On August 11, 1992, Bongho-Nourra, acting as National Coordinator of the AND, and UPADS Secretary-General Christophe Moukouéké signed an agreement with Congolese Labour Party (PCT) Secretary-General Ambroise Noumazalaye; the agreement provided for an alliance between the parties.

Following Lissouba's victory, he appointed Bongho-Nouarra as Prime Minister on September 2, 1992. Bongho-Nouarra's government was named on September 7; according to Bongho-Nouarra, his government was a "war cabinet", and he promised an "all-out assault" aimed at solving Congo's problems. He also said that the members of his government were selected for their expertise rather than their political experience.

The PCT was unhappy with the small number of portfolios it received in Bongho-Nouarra's government. It joined with the opposition Union for Democratic Renewal (URD) seven-party alliance to form a parliamentary majority against UPADS, and consequently Bongho-Nouarra's government was defeated in a no-confidence vote on October 31, 1992; the AND deputies were not present for the vote, and it was conducted by a show of hands. As a result of the vote, Bongho-Nouarra resigned on November 11 and Lissouba, rather than appoint a new prime minister from the opposition alliance, dissolved the National Assembly on November 17. Although he wanted Bongho-Nouarra to remain in office until a new parliamentary election was held, the opposition demanded that the National Assembly be restored and that Bongho-Nouarra's government resign; in a protest on November 30, three people were killed by security forces. The army urged the appointment of a new government with a neutral prime minister and warned that it could stage a coup if the situation continued. An agreement was reached on December 3 to form a national unity government and Lissouba appointed Claude Antoine Dacosta to replace Bongho-Nouarra on December 6.

After leaving office as Prime Minister, Bongho-Nouarra again acted as coordinator of the pro-Lissouba parties in campaigning for the May–June 1993 parliamentary election. He also continued to hold high-level posts during Lissouba's presidency, serving as Special Adviser to the President of the Republic, with the rank of Minister of State, as President of the Sociocultural Committee, and then as Minister of National Defense. He left Congo-Brazzaville at the time of the 1997 Civil War, but temporarily returned for a national dialogue in 1998. While in exile, he backed an exile group, the Patriotic Front for Dialogue and National Reconciliation (FPDRN), which called for peace and reconciliation and did not challenge the legitimacy of President Denis Sassou Nguesso. This group was founded in Paris in October 2000. Bongho-Nouarra lived in Brussels, Belgium in poor health for several years before he died there on October 7, 2007, aged 69. On October 8, Sassou Nguesso called his death "a great loss". Bongho-Nouarra's body was returned to Congo-Brazzaville on October 22, and he was buried at a cemetery in Brazzaville on October 23.

Political offices
Preceded by André Milongo	Prime Minister of Congo-Brazzaville; 1992	Succeeded by Claude Antoine Dacosta
