= Sony Lab'ou Tansi =

Congolese writer (1947–1995)

- Born: Marcel Ntsoni; 5 July 1947; Kimwaanza, Belgian Congo
- Died: 14 June 1995 (aged 47); Brazzaville, Republic of the Congo
- Occupations: Playwright, Novelist, Screenwriter
- Writing career
- Language: French
- Notable works: Life and a Half; Parentheses of Blood; The Antipeople; The Seven Solitudes of Lorsa Lopez
- Notable awards: • Concours Théâtral Interafricain de Radio-France Internationale (1979) • Grand Prix Littéraire d'Afrique Noire (1983) • Palme de la Francophonie (1985) • Ibsen Foundation Prize (1988)
- Literary movement: New African Literature

Sony Lab'ou Tansi (5 July 1947 – 14 June 1995), born Marcel Ntsoni, was a Congolese novelist, short-story writer, playwright, and poet in French language. Though he was only 47 when he died, Tansi remains one of the most prolific African writers and the most internationally renowned practitioner of the "New African Writing." His novel The Antipeople won the Grand Prix Littéraire d'Afrique Noire. In his later years, he ran a theatrical company in Brazzaville in the Republic of the Congo.

== Life and career ==
The oldest of seven children, Tansi was born in the former Belgian Congo, in the village of Kimwaanza, just south of the city now known as Kinshasa in the modern day Democratic Republic of the Congo. He was initially educated in the local language, Kikongo, and only began speaking French at the age of twelve, when his family moved to Congo-Brazzaville, today known as the Republic of the Congo. He attended the École Normale Supérieure d'Afrique Centrale in Brazzaville where he studied literature, and upon completing his education in 1971, he became a French and English teacher in Kindamba and Pointe-Noire. When the young teacher began writing for the theatre later that year, he adopted the pen name "Sony La'bou Tansi" as a tribute to Tchicaya U Tam'si, a fellow Congolese writer who wrote politically charged poetry about oppressive nature of the state.

In the early part of his career, Tansi continued to support himself through teaching and he worked as an English instructor at the Collège Tchicaya-Pierre in Pointe Noire while working on his first two novels and several plays. In 1979 he founded the Rocado Zulu Theatre, which would go on to perform his plays in Africa, Europe, and the United States in addition to appearing regularly at the Festival International des Francophonies in Limoges. Through theater, Tansi has been able to convey the possibilities theatre has in the aspect of political change through his works. Sony’s plays have shown how theatre functions politically through his critiques of the post-colonial world in Africa through theater.

Tansi's works focus on political critiques of colonial viewpoints being present in what is supposed to be post-colonial Congo. This is said to be seen in some of his works by using subtle messaging with the naming of cities in his play Marie Samar (1963). Within the play you can see the connection from the characters to Tansi's references to colonized and post colonized Congo. His works allow for telling a first hand experience of colonial rule in Congo and how it affected the lives of the people living there at the time before and after.

After teaching for many years, Tansi moved on to government work, serving as an administrator in several ministries in Brazzaville. In the late 1980s he allied with opposition leader Bernard Kolélas to found the Congolese Movement for Democracy and Integral Development (MCDDI), a political party acting against the communist regime of President Denis Sassou Nguesso and his Congolese Labour Party. Left-wing forces succeeded in pushing President Sassou toward democracy, and former Prime Minister Pascal Lissouba returned from an extended exile and was elected President in the August 1992 elections. In that same year, Tansi was elected to parliament as a deputy for the Makélékélé arrondissement of Brazzaville, but his participation in opposition politics angered President Lissouba, and his passport was withdrawn in 1994.

Tansi soon discovered that he had contracted the AIDS virus, but Lissouba's travel restrictions prevented him from going abroad to seek treatment for himself and his wife. Tansi's partner, Pierrette, died from the disease on 31 May 1995 and Tansi followed 14 days later.

== Bibliography ==
=== Novels and récits ===
- La Vie et demie, Seuil, 1979. Life and a Half, trans. Alison Dundy (Indiana University Press, 2011)
- L'État honteux, Seuil, 1981. The Shameful State, trans. Dominick Thomas (Indiana University Press, 2016)
- Lèse-majesté, ACCT, 1982.
- L'Anté-peuple, Seuil, 1983. The Antipeople, trans. J.A. Underwood. and M. Boyars (Marion Boyars, 1988). ISBN 0-7145-2845-5
- Les Sept Solitudes de Lorsa Lopez, Seuil, 1985. The Seven Solitudes of Lorsa Lopez, trans. Clive Wake (Heinemann, 1995). ISBN 0-435-90594-5
- Les Yeux du volcan, Seuil, 1988.
- Le Coup de vieux, Présence Africaine, 1988.
- Le Commencement des douleurs, Seuil, 1995.

=== Theatre ===
- La Parenthèse de sang, suivi de Je soussigné cardiaque, Hatier, 1981. Parentheses of Blood, trans. Lorraine Alexander Veach (Ubu Repertory Theater Publications, 1986). ISBN 0-913745-19-7
- Moi, veuve de l'empire, L'Avant-Scène, 1987. In Francophonie: 2 pièces.
- Qui a mangé Madame d'Avoine Bergotha, Lansman, 1989.
- La Résurrection rouge et blanche de Roméo et Juliette, revue Acteurs, 1990.
- Une chouette petite vie bien osée, Lansman, 1992.
- Une vie en arbre et chars... bonds, Lansman, 1992.
- Théâtre 1, Lansman, 1995. Qu'ils le disent, qu'elles le beuglent and Qui a mangé Madame d'Avoine Bergotha?
- Théâtre 2, Lansman, 1995. Une vie en arbre et chars... bonds and Une chouette petite vie bien osée
- Théâtre 3, Lansman, 1998. Monologue d'or et noces d'argent and Le trou
- Antoine m'a vendu son destin, Acoria, 1997.
- La Rue des mouches, Éditions Théâtrales, 2005.

=== Poetry ===
- Poèmes et vents lisses, Le Bruit des autres, 1995.
- Ici commence ici, NENA/Éditions Clé, 2013.
- Poèmes, ed. Claire Riffard and Nicolas Martin-Granel, Éditions du CNRS, 2015.

=== Other ===
- Conscience de tracteur (Dakar: Nouvelles Éditions Africaines / Yaoundé: Clé, 1979).
- Cinq ans de littératures africaines: 1979-1984 (Paris: C.L.E.F, 1985).
- Un citoyen de ce siècle (Paris: Equateur, 1986)—comprises "Lettre ouverte à l'humanité" and Antoine m'a vendu son destin.
- "An Open Letter to Africans" c/o The Punic One-Party State, an essay. Trans. John Conteh-Morgran. Published in Tejumola Olaniyan and Ato Quayson's African Literature: An Anthology of Criticism and Theory. Malden: Blackwell Publishers, 1990.
- L'autre monde: Écrits inédits, edited by Nicolas Martin-Granel and Bruno Tilliette (Paris: Revue Noire, 1997).
- L'atelier de Sony Labou Tansi, ed. Martin-Granel and Greta Rodriguez-Antoniotti' (Paris: Revue Noire, 2005)--comprises v1, Correspondance: Lettres à José Pivin (1973-1976) and Lettres à Françoise Ligier (1973-1983); v2, Poésie; and v3, Machin la hernie: Roman.
- Paroles inédites: La rue des mouches (comédie tragique), Entretiens, Lettres à Sony, ed. Bernard Magnier (Montreuil-sous-Bois: Éditions Théâtrales, 2005).

== Awards and honours ==
- 1979: Prix Spécial du Festival de la Francophonie for La Vie et demie
- 1983: Grand prix littéraire d'Afrique noire for L'Anté-peuple
- 1985: Palme de la Francophonie for Les Sept Solitudes de Lorsa Lopez
