= Kolélas =

Kolélas is a surname. Notable people with the name include:

- Bernard Kolélas (1933–2009), Congolese politician
- Euloge Landry Kolélas, Congolese politician
- Guy Brice Parfait Kolélas (1959–2021), Congolese politician
