= Rally for Democracy and Development =

Political party in the Republic of the Congo

The Rally for Democracy and Development (Rassemblement pour la Démocratie et le Développement; RDD) is a political party in the Republic of the Congo. It has been one of the main participants in a coalition known as the African Socialist Movement–Congolese Progressive Party (MSA–PPC).

== History ==
The RDD was founded in 1990 under the leadership of former head of state Joachim Yhombi-Opango. In the June–July 1992 parliamentary election, the RDD won five seats in the National Assembly. Yhombi-Opango was the RDD's candidate in the August 1992 presidential election, placing sixth with 3.49% of the vote.

In the June 1993 parliamentary election, the party won six seats in the National Assembly, and it was part of the governing coalition of President Pascal Lissouba, with Yhombi-Opango serving as prime minister from 1993 to 1996. The RDD was loyal to Lissouba during the 1997 civil war, and when rebels loyal to Denis Sassou Nguesso captured Brazzaville in October 1997, Yhombi-Opango fled into exile. Saturnin Okabé served as Interim President of the RDD during Yhombi-Opango's 10 years in exile.

A dispute in the RDD leadership emerged in 2005. Yhombi-Opango asked the party leadership to approach Sassou Nguesso's Congolese Party of Labour (PCT), but Okabé refused to do so; Yhombi-Opango reacted angrily to this refusal.

The party did not participate in the June–August 2007 parliamentary election. The party initially intended to participate, but later, in a statement on June 8, said that it would not because it did not believe the election would be free and fair.

An amnesty for Yhombi-Opango was approved in May 2007, and he returned from exile on 10 August 2008. At a meeting of the RDD Steering Committee on 8 September 2007, he reassumed the leadership of the party from Okabé and Secretary-General Martial Mathieu Kani. On this occasion, Yhombi-Opango announced his intention to reorganize the party and improve its position on the national political scene.

Along with the Pan-African Union for Social Democracy (UPADS) and the Union for Democracy and the Republic (UDR–Mwinda), the RDD formed the Alliance for the New Republic opposition coalition on 11 May 2007. Complaining that the 2007 parliamentary election and the 2008 local elections were "masquerades", this coalition withdrew from participation in national and local electoral commissions in August 2008. It wanted a new and independent electoral commission, in addition to an "all-inclusive national dialogue" prior to the 2009 presidential election.

On 23 February 2009, the formation of an alliance between the PCT and the RDD was announced. The parties agreed to present a single candidate in the 2009 presidential election, and the RDD agreed to join the government if their joint candidate (presumed to be Denis Sassou Nguesso) won the election.

34 RDD candidates stood in the July–August 2012 parliamentary election, but the party did not win any seats in the National Assembly.

Expressing unhappiness with its treatment by the PCT, especially with regard to the September 2014 local elections, the RDD announced that it was suspending its participation in the presidential majority (the broad coalition of parties supporting Sassou Nguesso) on 11 December 2014.
