= Mavoungou =

Mavoungou is a Congolese surname. Notable people with the surname include:

- Donatien Mavoungou (1947–2020), Gabonese doctor
- Jocelyne Mavoungou (born 1986), Congolese handball player
- Julienne Mavoungou Makaya (1950–2020), Republic of the Congo politician
- Martin Parfait Aimé Coussoud-Mavoungou (1959–2022), Congolese politician and businessman
- Maurice Mavoungou, Congolese politician
