= Euloge Landry Kolélas =

Congolese politician

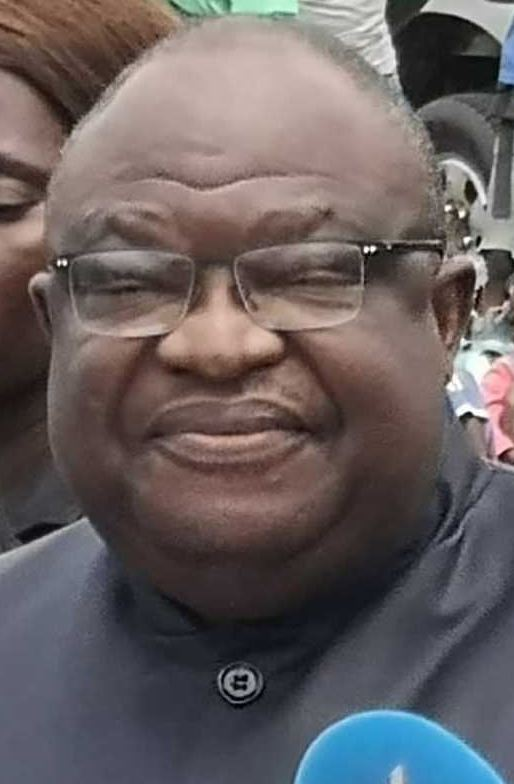
Euloge Kolélas

Euloge Landry Kolélas is a Congolese politician who served in the government of Congo-Brazzaville as Minister of Trade from 2015 to 2017. Previously he was a Deputy in the National Assembly from 2007 to 2012. He is the President of the Congolese Movement for Democracy and Integral Development (MCDDI), a political party, and has served as High Commissioner for the Reintegration of Former Combatants since 2017.

== Political career ==
Kolélas is a son of Bernard Kolélas, who was one of Congo-Brazzaville's main political leaders during the 1990s, and joined his father's party, the Congolese Movement for Democracy and Integral Development (MCDDI). When Bernard Kolélas fled Congo-Brazzaville at the end of the June–October 1997 civil war, Euloge Landry accompanied him into exile.

In the June 2007 parliamentary election, Kolélas stood as the MCDDI candidate for the first constituency of Makélékélé, a district of Brazzaville. Due to local organizational difficulties, the election in that constituency was postponed and held in July 2007. Kolélas won the seat in the first round with 50.06% of the vote. He was then elected as President of the National Assembly's Health and Social Affairs Commission on 18 September 2007.

At the MCDDI's First Convention, held in Brazzaville on 24–25 May 2008, Euloge Landry Kolélas was promoted to the MCDDI National Executive Bureau and designated as National Secretary for External Relations and Inter-Party Relations. On the same occasion, his brother, Guy Brice Parfait Kolélas was designated as Coordinator of the National Executive Bureau; he was thus positioned as the MCDDI's second-ranking figure and as the probable successor to Bernard Kolélas.

As part of his work on behalf of his constituents, Kolélas inaugurated a drinking water installation in the Matour neighborhood of Makélékélé on 22 May 2010. The installation was badly needed, as the neighborhood had gone without running water for years.

In the July–August 2012 parliamentary election, Kolélas stood again as the MCDDI candidate in the first constituency of Makélékélé. In the first round of voting, he placed first with 37.84% of the vote, ahead of François Loussakou of the Citizen Rally (RC), who received 21.43%. However, Loussakou prevailed over Kolélas in the second round of voting, receiving 54.20% of the vote.

Standing as an MCDDI candidate, Kolélas was elected as a local councillor in Makélékélé in the September 2014 local elections. He was subsequently elected by the city council as First Vice-President of the Brazzaville Departmental Council on 23 October 2014.

He was appointed to the government as Minister of Trade and Supplies on 10 August 2015. At the same time, his brother, Guy Brice Parfait Kolélas, was dismissed from the government after coming out in opposition to changing the constitution to allow President Denis Sassou Nguesso to run for another term. After Sassou Nguesso's victory in the March 2016 presidential election, he retained Euloge Landry Kolélas in his post as Minister of External Trade and Consumption on 30 April 2016.

Kolélas was again defeated in his bid to win the seat for the first constituency of Makélékélé in the July 2017 parliamentary election, and the MCDDI under his leadership failed to win a single seat in the election. Meanwhile, the Union of Humanist Democrats (UDH-Yuki), a splinter party established by his brother (who remained in opposition to Sassou Nguesso), succeeded in drawing much support away from the pro-government MCDDI and won eight seats. Following the election, Euloge Landry was not retained in the government, but was moved to a post at the Presidency as High Commissioner for the Reintegration of Former Combatants on 22 August 2017.
