= Union for Democracy and the Republic =

Union for Democracy and the Republic is the name of several African political parties:

- Union for Democracy and the Republic (Niger), a political party in Niger
- Union for Democracy and the Republic (Congo), a political party in the Republic of the Congo
- Union for Democracy and the Republic (Chad), a political party in Chad
- Union for Democracy and the Republic (Algeria), a former political party in Algeria
