= Mbemba =

Mbemba is a Congolese name. Notable people with the name include:

- Afonso I of Kongo, aka Nzinga Mbemba, King of Kongo (1509–1543)
- Chancel Mbemba (born 1994), Congolese footballer
- Jean-Martin Mbemba (born 1942), Congolese politician
- Mbemba Sylla (born 1982), Guinean footballer
- Nolan Mbemba (born 1995), French footballer
- Pedro VI of Kongo, aka Mbemba, King of Kongo (1896–1910)
- Pieter Mbemba (born 1988), Belgian footballer
- Rudy Mbemba (born 1987), Swedish basketball player
- Théophile Mbemba Fundu, Congolese politician
