= Ferdinand Mbahou =

Congolese military figure

Ferdinand Mbahou is a Congolese military figure who served as Congo-Brazzaville's Director of Presidential Security from 1992 to 1997, under President Pascal Lissouba.

== Background and career ==
Mbahou, an ethnic Bembe and native of Bouenza who held the rank of colonel, was Lissouba's Director of Presidential Security from 1992 to 1997. In October 1997, when Lissouba was ousted by rebels loyal to Denis Sassou Nguesso at the conclusion of a civil war, Mbahou fled into exile. While in exile, he remained sympathetic to the opposition to Sassou Nguesso and met with the opposition leader Emmanuel Ngouélondélé.

=== Return from exile ===
After nearly 12 years in exile, Mbahou returned to Congo-Brazzaville on 15 July 2009. He was promptly arrested on 21 July, possibly due to his links with the opposition, although no official reason was given. Mbahou was eventually released in February 2010, although his arrest was still not explained.

Mbahou was eventually put on trial on two charges: undermining state security and usurping the rank of general of the army. He was said to have claimed in 2008 that there was an armed opposition "loyalist army"; at his trial, he admitted making the claim but said that it was false and that he had made the claim because he hoped it would facilitate his return from exile. He was also accused of unlawfully assuming the rank of general of the army during the 1997 civil war. In response to that charge, Mbahou said that Lissouba had appointed him to that rank through a verbal decree; he argued that the appointment was legitimate, even if not made in written form, due to the extraordinary circumstances of wartime. Ultimately, the Brazzaville Court of Appeal acquitted Mbahou on both charges on 28 December 2010. The Court acquitted Mbahou on the first charge on the grounds that a physical act of crime had to be proven, and it acquitted him on the second charge because he had not actually adopted the uniform corresponding to the rank he claimed.

Mbahou continued to actively oppose the government of President Sassou Nguesso. In 2013 he called for civil disobedience if Sassou Nguesso attempted to change the constitution in order to enable himself to run for re-election in 2016.
