= Martial Mathieu Kani =

Congolese politician and academic

Martial Mathieu Kani is a Congolese politician and academic. A leading member of the Rally for Democracy and Development (RDD), he served in the government of Congo-Brazzaville as Minister of the Tourist Industry and Leisure from September 2009 to September 2012.

== Academic and political career ==
Born at Boundji in Cuvette Region, Kani studied in Brazzaville and subsequently at the University of Strasbourg in France. He worked as a teacher for years. From 1991 to 1992 he was a member of the Higher Council of the Republic, a body that was set up as a transitional parliament by the 1991 National Conference. At the conclusion of the transition, Kani was elected to the National Assembly of Congo-Brazzaville in the 1992 parliamentary election; he was re-elected in the 1993 parliamentary election, which was held early due to a political crisis. Kani sat in the National Assembly until 1996, when he was elected as Mayor of Owando; he served as Mayor until 1997.

In 2006, Kani became head of the department of education sciences at the Marien Ngouabi University in Brazzaville.

As Secretary-General of the RDD, Kani, together with Saturnin Okabé, led the party's work while its leader, Joachim Yhombi-Opango, was in exile. Beginning in 1997, Yhombi-Opango spent 10 years in exile before the government granted him an amnesty and he was able to return to Congo-Brazzaville. At a meeting of the RDD Steering Committee on 8 September 2007, Yhombi-Opango reassumed the leadership of the party from Kani and Okabé. On this occasion, Yhombi-Opango announced his intention to reorganize the party and improve its position on the national political scene.

On 23 February 2009, the formation of an alliance between the ruling Congolese Labour Party (PCT) and the RDD, which had previously been an opposition party, was announced. The parties agreed to present a single candidate in the 2009 presidential election, and the RDD agreed to join the government if their joint candidate (presumed to be President Denis Sassou Nguesso) won the election. After Sassou Nguesso won the election, Kani was appointed to the government as Minister of the Tourist Industry and Leisure on 15 September 2009.

In the July–August 2012 parliamentary election, Kani stood as the RDD candidate in the first constituency of Owando, where he faced a prominent opponent: Gilbert Ondongo, the Minister of Finance, who stood as the PCT's candidate for the seat. Ondongo handily defeated Kani, winning the seat in the first round of voting with 75.19% of the vote. Following the election, Kani was dismissed from the government on 25 September 2012, and the RDD was no longer represented in the government. The political weakness of the RDD meant that Sassou Nguesso had nothing to gain by retaining Kani in the government.

In March 2013, Yhombi-Opango decided to expel Kani and Anaclet Tsomambet from the RDD in response to a dispute within the party, and Kani then resigned. Kani subsequently became President of the Congolese Congress for Democracy and Progress (CCDP). On 9 February 2016, the CCDP signed an agreement with the PCT, and Kani affirmed his party's support for Denis Sassou Nguesso's candidacy in the March 2016 presidential election.
