= André Milongo =

Prime Minister of the Republic of the Congo (1935–2007)

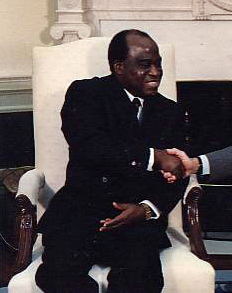
- Milongo in 1991

Prime minister of the Republic of the Congo
- In office 8 June 1991 – 2 September 1992
- Preceded by: Louis Sylvain Goma
- Succeeded by: Stéphane Maurice Bongho-Nouarra

President of the National Assembly of Congo
- In office 24 September 1992 – 17 November 1992
- Preceded by: André Mouélé
- Succeeded by: Justin Koumba

Personal details
- Born: 20 October 1935 Mankondi, French Equatorial Africa
- Died: 23 July 2007 (aged 71) Paris, France

André Ntsatouabantou Milongo (20 October 1935 – 23 July 2007) was a Congolese politician who served as Prime Minister of the Republic of the Congo from June 1991 to August 1992. He was chosen by the 1991 National Conference to lead the country during its transition to multiparty elections, which were held in 1992. He was also the founder and President of the Union for Democracy and the Republic (UDR-Mwinda), a political party. From 1993 to 1997, he was President of the National Assembly, and he was again a deputy in the National Assembly from 2002 to 2007.

== Early life and political career ==
A member of the Lari ethnic group, Milongo, one of four children in his family, was born in October 1935 in Mankondi, a village located to the south-west of the capital Brazzaville, in the Boko District of Pool Region.

After his primary and secondary schooling in Brazzaville, Milongo earned a Master's Degree in Law at the University of Nancy, after which he studied at the École Nationale d'Administration (ÉNA) in Paris, graduating in 1964. That year is also known as the "Blaise Pascal generation" at ÉNA. He was among only four Congolese citizens to have graduated from ÉNA. Former Togolese prime minister Edem Kodjo was a classmate of Milongo at ÉNA.

Milongo began his professional career in 1964 as the first National Treasurer (Trésorier Payeur Général) in the newly independent Republic of the Congo, a position he held for five years. In this position, he rigorously managed the country's public funds. After this, he became director of the country's foreign investments in 1969 (Directeur General des Investissements) at the Ministry of Planning, remaining in that position until 1973. Two prime ministers also enlisted his help as an economic policy advisor under the government of Marien Ngouabi.

Milongo married Ndambo Marie-Therese Laurentine on 4 February 1967, and with her he had seven children.

He was elected to the board of governors at the African Development Bank in the Ivory Coast in 1976, and represented eight African countries: Congo, Cameroon, Benin, Côte d'Ivoire, Burkina Faso, Niger and Mauritania. He held that position for 7 years, before being elected to the board of governors at the World Bank in Washington, D.C. in 1983, where he met his colleague Nicephore Soglo. He remained at the World Bank until 1990.

In the early 1990s, the Republic of the Congo was going bankrupt because of the loss of support from the Soviet Union after the collapse of Communism. This led to the emergence of a new generation of African leaders like Nicéphore Soglo in Benin, Alassane Ouattara in the Ivory Coast and André Milongo. At the end of the Sovereign National Conference of 1991, the Conference elected Milongo as Prime Minister on 8 June 1991. As Prime Minister, he was given executive powers and placed in charge of directing the country's transition to multiparty elections in 1992. The National Conference additionally assigned the positions of Minister of Defense and Minister of Mines and Energy to Milongo.

Milongo's government was dominated by members of the Lari and Bakongo ethnic groups. Tensions between the government and the army led to a serious crisis in January 1992. It was alleged that, in order to gain control of the army, members of Milongo's government spread rumors that the army was plotting a coup. Furthermore, in moves viewed as being directed against loyalists of President Denis Sassou Nguesso, Milongo appointed Colonel Michel Gangouo, who had been implicated in a 1990 coup attempt against Sassou Nguesso, as Secretary of State for Defense on 2 January 1992. He made further changes to the military command, which he said were intended to fight tribalism, in mid-January. The army strongly opposed these changes and demanded that Milongo reverse them. The Higher Council of the Republic (CSR), which was acting as the transitional parliament, judged that the coup rumors had been created by members of Milongo's government and requested that Milongo accede to the army's demands. Milongo refused to dismiss Gangouo, however, at which point soldiers took over the international airport as well as state radio and television, fired on Milongo's supporters, killing several, and called for Milongo's resignation. Milongo went into hiding and called for international assistance. Gangouo then resigned from his position and Milongo appointed a new Minister of Defense who was supported by the army; however, he also placed himself in supreme command of the army.

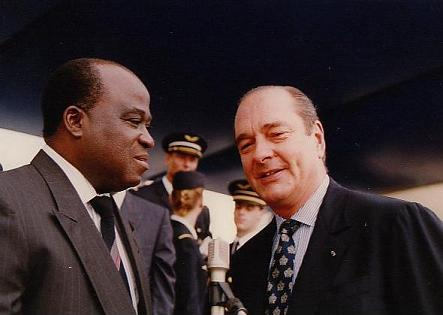
Milongo in a private conversation with French President Jacques Chirac.

Municipal elections were held on 3 May 1992, and Milongo's government was widely criticized for its handling of these elections. The CSR told Milongo to form a new, national unity government. Interior Minister Alexis Gabou was particularly criticized for his role in the elections, and the CSR asked that he be replaced. Milongo named a new and much smaller government on 21 May. The CSR also transferred responsibility for handling the parliamentary and presidential elections scheduled for later that year from Milongo's government to an electoral commission.

In the August 1992 presidential election, Milongo ran as a presidential candidate, placing fourth with 10.18% of the vote. He received his strongest support in Brazzaville and Pool Region, with 21.6% and 16.5% respectively. The transitional period ended with the swearing-in of the election winner, Pascal Lissouba, on 31 August 1992.

Milongo founded a political party, the Union for Democracy and the Republic (UDR-Mwinda: Union pour la Démocratie et la République; Mwinda means light in the Lari language), which he headed for the rest of his life. In the 1993 parliamentary election, he was elected to the National Assembly as the UDR candidate in Boko constituency, becoming one of two UDR deputies in the National Assembly. On 22 June 1993, Milongo was elected as the President of the National Assembly, remaining in that position until 1997. During the political violence of 1993, Milongo requested and obtained a ceasefire from both parties involved in the conflict, President Pascal Lissouba and opposition leader Bernard Kolélas.

After the June–October 1997 civil war, in which Denis Sassou Nguesso returned to power, Milongo remained in the Congo, stating that he had nothing to fear from the Sassou Nguesso's leadership. He asserted that the Republic of Congo belonged to all Congolese nationals. After the war, he was a member of the National Transitional Council (CNT).

On 24 September 2001, Milongo's candidacy for the next presidential election was announced by the Alliance for Democracy and Progress (ADP), a grouping of parties that supported him. Milongo accused the government of fraud in the January 2002 constitutional referendum, claiming that the "No" vote had actually won, and said that if he won the presidential election, he would initiate a "new political order" with a peace pact to end political violence and would allow all exiled politicians to return. On 8 March 2002, two days before the presidential election on 10 March, Milongo withdrew his candidacy, accusing Sassou Nguesso of rigging the vote. He said that party members were not allowed to observe the voting process, that there were areas where half of the ballot papers omitted his name, and that he had requested that the election be delayed. In the May 2002 parliamentary election, Milongo was elected to the National Assembly as the UDR-Mwinda's candidate in Boko constituency; he won the seat in the first round with 59.65% of the vote. Due to his status as the oldest deputy, he presided over the National Assembly's first meeting of the new parliamentary term, at which the bureau of the National Assembly was elected, on 10 August 2002. In the National Assembly, he became President of the UDR-Mwinda Parliamentary Group on 24 August 2002.

In addition to heading the UDR-Mwinda, Milongo was the chairman of a coalition of 11 political parties (Front pour une Commission Electorale independante), an assembly of political parties calling for transparency and independence in the management of all future elections.

Milongo ran for re-election to the National Assembly in the 2007 parliamentary election, but was defeated in the first round, held on 24 June. Following an illness, he died in a hospital in Paris on 23 July 2007, aged 71. In a statement on 24 July, Sassou Nguesso described Milongo's death as "a great loss for the Congolese nation" and praised Milongo for his service as Prime Minister from 1991 to 1992. Milongo was laid in state at the Parliament building, where politicians paid tribute to him and Sassou Nguesso bestowed a posthumous high honor on him, before being buried at his residence on 20 August.

Political offices
Preceded by Louis Sylvain Goma	Prime Minister of Congo-Brazzaville; 1991–1992	Succeeded by Stéphane Maurice Bongho-Nouarra
