= Mboungou =

Mboungou is a Congolese surname. Notable people with the surname include:

- Joseph Kignoumbi Kia Mboungou, Congolese politician
- Prestige Mboungou (born 2000), Congolese footballer
