= Republic of the Congo Civil War =

Republic of the Congo Civil War may refer to:

- Republic of the Congo Civil War (1993–1994)
- Republic of the Congo Civil War (1997–1999)

== See also ==
- Congolese Civil War (disambiguation)
