= Maurice Mavoungou =

Republic of the Congo politician

Maurice Mavoungou is a Congolese politician who has been a Deputy in the National Assembly of Congo-Brazzaville since 2002. He has also been President of the Economy and Finance Commission of the National Assembly since 2012.

== Political career ==
Under President Pascal Lissouba, Mavoungou served as Director of Protocol during the 1990s. Later, in January 2002, he was appointed to head the gas subsidiary of the National Petroleum Company of the Congo (Société nationale des pétroles du Congo, SNPC). Standing as an independent candidate in the May–June 2002 parliamentary election, he won the seat for the third constituency of Lumumba, a section of Pointe-Noire, in the second round of voting.

In the June 2007 parliamentary election, Mavoungou stood for re-election as an independent candidate in the third constituency of Pointe-Noire's Lumumba district. He placed second in the first round, receiving 34.31% of the vote against 39.89% for Jérôme Balou, the candidate of the Congolese Labour Party (PCT); because neither candidate won a majority, they faced each other in a second round of voting, held in August 2007. Initial second round results from the local electoral commission showed Balou winning the seat with 54.98% of the vote against 45.02% for Mavoungou, but in the results subsequently proclaimed on 9 August by François Ibovi, the Minister of Territorial Administration, Mavoungou was declared the winner. In contrast to the other seats, Ibovi did not give numerical results for the constituency and simply declared that Mavoungou had won.

According to Ibovi, the votes from two polling stations were not included in the initial results, but he said that problem had been corrected, without identifying the percentages of the vote received by the candidates under the revised calculation. The anomaly of declaring a candidate elected without identifying his share of the vote was noted, and Balou declared that he was the actual winner, in line with the results from the local electoral commission. The confusion was reportedly due to the confiscation of two ballot boxes by soldiers after voting took place; although the ballot boxes were later returned, they appeared to have been affected by tampering and consequently it was agreed that they would not be counted. In the absence of those ballot boxes, Balou won the second round, and Ibovi's announcement that Mavoungou had won, contrary to the expected result, produced some local confusion and tension.

Shortly after the National Assembly began meeting for its new parliamentary term, Mavoungou was designated as one of 26 members of an ad hoc commission that was assigned the task of reviewing the National Assembly's internal and financial regulations on 5 September 2007. Mavoungou was assigned to chair one of the ad hoc commission's two sub-commissions, the sub-commission on financial regulations. When that preliminary work was complete, Mavoungou was designated as First Vice-President of the National Assembly's Economy and Finance Commission on 18 September 2007.

Mavoungou was part of a delegation of Congolese deputies who visited Libya on 5–8 April 2008 as part of an effort to improve cooperation between the National Assembly and the General People's Congress of Libya.

In the National Assembly, Mavoungou was designated as President of the Congo-Germany Friendship Group on 10 April 2009; he replaced Serge-Michel Odzocki, who had been appointed to the government. Calling attention to the plight of unwed mothers, Mavoungou distributed kits of toys as Christmas gifts to more than 500 of them (ages 15 to 30) in his constituency on 24 December 2009.

On 5–6 February 2010, at the First Ordinary Congress of the Action and Renewal Movement (MAR)—a political party headed by Pointe-Noire Mayor Roland Bouiti-Viaudo—Mavoungou was elected to the party's 22-member Political Bureau. As the Delegate of the Political Bureau, Mavoungou led a MAR national membership drive that was launched in Pointe-Noire in May 2010 as part of an effort to revitalize the party. Mavoungou also expressed the party leadership's desire to see more debate as part of its plan to reinvigorate the party.

In the July–August 2012 parliamentary election, Mavoungou stood for re-election as the MAR candidate in the third constituency of Lumumba. He met with a local group of hearing-impaired individuals on 5 July 2012 and was endorsed by them on the grounds that he paid "special attention" to them. He in turn vowed to work to advance their interests through legislation if re-elected. In the election, Mavoungou placed first in the first round of voting; he received 39.21% of the vote against 25.42% for Noël Diambou, the candidate of the opposition Pan-African Union for Social Democracy (UPADS). Mavoungou defeated Diambou and won the seat in the second round of voting, receiving 54.62% of the vote. On 19 September 2012, he was designated as President of the National Assembly's Economy and Finance Commission.

In May 2013, Mavoungou donated money to restore four classrooms at a commercial technical school in his constituency that had been vandalized during a teachers' strike. He also bemoaned the lack of computer equipment at the school. Mavoungou led a delegation of the Economy and Finance Commission in a visit to Brazzaville's University Hospital Center in October 2013 to review how the hospital's funds were being spent. The delegation expressed satisfaction with the results.

At a meeting with his constituents in Lumumba in January 2014, Mavoungou discussed the planned infrastructure projects for Pointe-Noire contained in the 2014 budget. Responding to skeptical constituents who noted past failures, he assured them that the projects would actually be implemented and that progress would be monitored. He also urged support for the government's efforts. In response to complaints about specific local problems, Mavoungou noted that the budget included funds for the improvement of sanitation and said that water and electrical service would be improved. He also said that a new wall would be built around a primary school in the area.

As head of Citizen Action for Local Development, a political association he founded in 2000, Mavoungou organized a blood donation at which he and other members of the association gave blood on 30 March 2014 in Pointe-Noire. Speaking on the occasion, Mavoungou called on others to give blood as well, stressing that by doing so ordinary citizens could save lives and contribute to public health.

In the July 2017 parliamentary election, Mavoungou stood for re-election in the third constituency of Lumumba. He initiated his re-election campaign with a series of projects to improve local water and electricity supply and a road, vowing "more actions and fewer words". He was re-elected with a majority in the first round of voting, receiving 62.5% of the vote. He was retained in his post as President of the Commission for the Economy, Finance and Execution of the State Budget on 2 September 2017.
