= Congolese Movement for Democracy and Integral Development =

Political party in the Republic of the Congo

Congolese Movement for Democracy and Integral Development Mouvement congolais pour la démocratie et le développement intégral
- Leader: Euloge Landry Kolélas (Since 2017); Guy Brice Parfait Kolélas (2009–2017); Bernard Kolélas (until 2009)
- Founded: 3 August 1989
- Headquarters: Brazzaville, Republic of the Congo
- Ideology: Liberalism; Conservatism
- Political position: Centre to centre-right
- International affiliation: Liberal International (observer)
- Colors: Blue and yellow
- National Assembly: 1 / 151

Website
- Official website

The Congolese Movement for Democracy and Integral Development (French: Mouvement congolais pour la démocratie et le développement intégral; MCDDI) is a liberal political party in the Republic of the Congo, led by Bernard Kolélas until his death in 2009. The MCDDI is an observer party of Liberal International.

== History ==
=== Founding and first democratic elections ===
The party was co-founded by Kolélas and renowned novelist and writer Sony Lab'ou Tansi; its statutes were deposited at the Ministry of the Interior on 3 August 1989. Kolélas was the MCDDI's candidate in the August 1992 presidential election, in which he placed second behind Pascal Lissouba of the Pan-African Union for Social Democracy (UPADS).

The party became the second largest group in the 1992 Republic of the Congo parliamentary elections. It formed an opposition alliance called the Union for Democratic Renewal (URD) in the National Assembly. After the Congolese Party of Labour defected from the government of President Lissouba, the URD joined a national unity government with Lissoubas UPADS and the Congelese Party of Labour until a new parliamentary election could be held in 1993.

Didier Sengha, an MCDDI deputy in the National Assembly, left the MCDDI in April 1995 and founded a new party, the Party of Unity, Work and Progress (PUTP), in May 1995. The new party said that the MCDDI had abandoned its principles and that Kolélas controlled the MCDDI in an autocratic manner; Kolélas, in turn, denounced Sengha as a criminal, saying that he was guilty of embezzlement and misappropriating funds.

=== Republic of Congo Civil Wars ===
After the 1993 Republic of the Congo parliamentary election President Lissouba and his allies controlled a majority in the National Assembly. Pre- and post-election violence between the government and opposition spiralled into a series of civil wars. During the Republic of the Congo Civil Wars the party was linked to the Ninja militia. The militia allied with the Congolese Party of Labour aligned Cobra militia against the government of Pascal Lissouba and his Cocoye Militia during the First Republic of the Congo Civil War from 1993 to 1994. The MCDDI joined a coalition government in 1995.

When fighting between the Cobra and Cocoye militias broke out again in 1997, President Lissouba appointed MCDDI leader Bernard Kolélas as Prime Minister of the Republic of the Congo at the head of a government of national unity in September 1997. Lissouba and Kolélas were ousted by a combined offensive of the Angolan Armed Forces and the Cobra militias, returning the presidency to Denis Sassou Nguesso.

The party did not take part in the 2002 Republic of the Congo parliamentary election or 2002 Republic of the Congo presidential election. Party members were arrested, imprisoned or killed during and in the aftermath of the civil war. Party leader Bernard Kolélas had been sentenced to death in absentia in 2000 and fled into exile after the civil war. He was only able to return in 2005, after President Nguesso allowed his return for the funeral of his wife. A law gave him amnesty afterwards, allowing his permanent return to the country and the re-establishment of the MCDDI as a political party.

=== Electoral politics since 2007 ===
The MCDDI and the Congolese Labour Party (PCT) of President Denis Sassou Nguesso signed an agreement on April 24, 2007, to form an alliance for the 2007 parliamentary election as well as subsequent local, senatorial, and presidential elections. In the parliamentary election, held on June 24 and August 5, 2007, the party won 11 out of 137 seats in the National Assembly.

At the MCDDI's First Convention, held in Brazzaville on 24–25 May 2008, Guy Brice Parfait Kolélas, a son of Bernard Kolélas, was designated as the Coordinator of the MCDDI National Executive Bureau and National Secretary for Development Strategies. In that capacity, he was considered the second ranking member of the party, after his father. However, his father was by that point an elderly man in apparently declining health (although present, he failed to even give the closing speech at the convention), and thus the son was effectively being designated as the MCDDI's de facto leader. It was also considered evident that he was being positioned to ultimately succeed his father.

Bernard Kolélas died at the age of 76 on 13 November 2009. The MCDDI Executive Bureau met on 23 January 2010 and decided that Guy Brice Parfait Kolélas would serve as Interim President of the MCDDI, in addition to his role as Coordinator of the Executive Bureau, until a party congress could be held. In its previous 20 years of existence under Bernard Kolélas, the MCDDI had never held a congress.

Speaking to MCDDI supporters in June 2014, Kolélas sharply criticized the party's ally, the PCT, for failing to fulfill its promises. He complained that the MCDDI had been promised a variety of posts—"ambassadors, prefects, mayors and many other things"—but that the PCT had not followed through. Nevertheless, he said that he would not terminate the alliance, as it was "signed on the blood of our ancestors".

Guy Brice Parfait Kolélas left the party in 2017 and formed his own group, the Union of Humanist Democrats-Yuki, after a falling out between him and his brother Euloge Landry Kolélas, who took over party leadership. Guy Kolélas and his party went into opposition to President Nguesso, while Euloge Kolélas and the MCDDI participated in the government. The party supported President Nguesso for a fourth term in the 2026 Republic of the Congo presidential election.

== Electoral history ==
=== Presidential elections ===
Election	Party candidate	First round		Second round		Results
Election	Party candidate	Votes	%	Votes	%	Results
1992	Bernard Kolélas	159,682	20.37	319,396	38.68	Lost ✗
2002	Didn't participate					
2009	Denis Sassou Nguesso (PCT)	1,055,117	78.61	—		Elected ✓
2016	Guy Brice Parfait Kolélas	209,632	15.04	—		Lost ✗
2021	Denis Sassou Nguesso (PCT)	1,539,725	88.40	—		Elected ✓
2026	Denis Sassou Nguesso (PCT)	TBD	TBD	TBD	TBD	TBD

=== National Assembly elections ===
Election	Party leader	Votes	%	Seats	+/–	Position	Result
1992	Bernard Kolélas			29 / 125	New	2nd	Opposition (1992)
1992	Bernard Kolélas			29 / 125	New	2nd	National Unity Government (1992–1993)
1993	Bernard Kolélas			28 / 125	▼1	2nd	Opposition (1993–1995)
1993	Bernard Kolélas			28 / 125	▼1	2nd	Coalition Government (1995–1997)
2002	N/A			0 / 137	▼28	N/A	Didn't run
2007	Bernard Kolélas			11 / 137	New	2nd	Coalition Government
2012	Guy Brice Parfait Kolélas			7 / 139	▼4	2nd	Coalition Government
2017	Euloge Landry Kolélas			4 / 151 Extended mandates since no elections could be held in the Pool Department	▼3	▼3rd	Coalition Government
2022	Euloge Landry Kolélas			1 / 151	▼3	▼9th	Coalition Government
