= Cocoye Militia =

Congolese militia

- Leader: Pascal Lissouba
- Founded: 1993
- Country: Republic of the Congo
- Active regions: Southwest Republic of Congo
- Size: 3,000 (Height)

The Cocoye Militia was a militia during the first and second Republic of the Congo civil wars that fought for Pascal Lissouba.

== History ==
=== Formation ===
The Cocoye militia was formed in 1993 by Pascal Lissouba. Lissouba heavily distrusted the armed forces of the county and did not think that they would support them. He formed his own militia that he trusted to support him. He formed the militia from army personnel and supporters from the Departments of Niari, Lékoumou, and Bouenza. He bought mercenaries from Israel, Serbia, and Zaire to train his militia.

=== First Civil War ===
During the first civil war the Cocoye militia was allied with Lissouba, they fought against the allied Ninja and Cobra militias. In Brazzaville, the Cocoye controlled the center of the city, the conflict ended up killing 2,000 and ended in the peace agreement with neither side gaining victory.

=== Second civil war ===
In June 1997 Lissouba feared a Coup d'état and sent the Cocoyes to arrest the leader of the Cobra Militia, Denis Sassou Nguesso, and disarm the militia, starting the second civil war. Their former enemy, the Ninjas, allied with them against the Cobra, during the second civil war. The Cocoye played a major role in the conflict, capturing the Moukoukoulou Dam and cutting power to much of the south.
