= Patriotic Union for Democracy and Progress =

Political party in the Republic of the Congo

The Patriotic Union for Democracy and Progress (Union Patriotique pour la Démocratie et le Progrès, UPDP) is a political party in the Republic of the Congo. It is led by Auguste-Célestin Gongarad Nkoua

In opposition to President Pascal Lissouba, the UPDP joined with six other parties to form the Union for Democratic Renewal (URD) opposition coalition on 27 August 1992.

In the parliamentary election held on June 24 and August 5, 2007, the party won 2 out of 137 seats.
