= Union for Democracy and the Republic (Republic of the Congo) =

Political party in the Republic of the Congo

The Union for Democracy and the Republic (French: Union pour la Démocratie et la République-Mwinda) is a political party in the Republic of the Congo. André Milongo, who was the country's transitional Prime Minister from 1991 to 1992, was the President of the UDR-Mwinda until his death in 2007.

== History ==
The UDR-Mwinda was founded in October 1992. In the 1993 parliamentary election, the UDR-Mwinda won two seats in the National Assembly, including one for Milongo, who was elected as President of the National Assembly. In the parliamentary election held on 26 May and 23 June 2002, the party won 6 out of 137 seats in the National Assembly. In the parliamentary election held on June 24 and August 5, 2007, the UDR-Mwinda won one seat out of 137; it was, along with the Pan-African Union for Social Democracy (UPADS), one of two opposition parties represented in the National Assembly.

Following Milongo's death in July 2007, the UDR-Mwinda held a national congress in Brazzaville on April 12–13 2008, pledging to uphold Milongo's political thought. At the congress, Guy Kinfoussia Romain, a retired military officer, was elected as President of the UDR-Mwinda; in addition, a political bureau and a 150-member national council were elected. Romain spoke on this occasion of the party's continuing opposition to the Congolese Party of Labour-led government and said that the UDR-Mwinda wanted "to play a major role within the Alliance for the New Republic", an opposition coalition.

Along with UPADS and the Rally for Democracy and Development (RDD), the UDR-Mwinda formed the Alliance for the New Republic on May 11, 2007. Complaining that the 2007 parliamentary election and the 2008 local elections were "masquerades", this coalition withdrew from participation in national and local electoral commissions in August 2008. It wanted a new and independent electoral commission, in addition to an "all-inclusive national dialogue" prior to the 2009 presidential election.
