= Charles David Ganao =

Congolese politician (1926–2012)

Prime Minister of the Republic of the Congo
- In office August 27, 1996 – September 8, 1997
- President: Pascal Lissouba
- Preceded by: Joachim Yhombi-Opango
- Succeeded by: Bernard Kolélas

Personal details
- Born: 20 July 1926; Djambala, French Equatorial Africa
- Died: 6 July 2012 (aged 85); Paris, France

Charles David Ganao (20 July 1926 – 6 July 2012) was a Congolese politician who served as Prime Minister of the Republic of the Congo from 27 August 1996 to 8 September 1997.

Ganao was born in Djambala, in the present-day Plateaux Department of the Republic of Congo. His family were high-ranking members of the Teke people.

Ganao began his career as a teacher and elementary school principal, before entering diplomacy. He was appointed as the Republic of Congo's first ambassador to the United States and first permanent representative to the United Nations following the country's independence in 1960. Ganao then served as Congo's foreign minister from 1963 to 1968 and from 1973 to 1975.

Ganao next worked at the United Nations, based in Vienna, Austria. He participated in the 1991 Sovereign National Conference, which eliminated the Congolese Party of Labour government, replaced the country's flag and national anthem, and removed the word "People's" from the official name of the Republic of Congo. Ganao also founded the Union of Democratic Forces political party.

Ganao was appointed as prime minister by President Pascal Lissouba in 1996. Lissouba was overthrown in October 1997 during the Republic of the Congo Civil War, shortly as Ganao left office in September. Ganao fled to neighboring Gabon, where he was given exile by Gabonese President Omar Bongo.

Ganao returned to Congo-Brazzaville in 2005, but stayed out of politics for the rest of his life. He died in Paris on 6 July 2012 at the age of 85.

Political offices
Preceded by Joachim Yhombi-Opango	Prime Minister of Congo-Brazzaville; 1996-1997	Succeeded by Bernard Kolélas
