= Goma Tsé-Tsé District =

Goma Tsé-Tsé
- District
- Interactive map of Goma Tsé-Tsé
- Country: Republic of the Congo
- Department: Pool Department

Area
  - Total: 486 sq mi (1,258 km^{2})

Population (2023 census)
  - Total: 42,537
  - Density: 87.58/sq mi (33.81/km^{2})
- Time zone: UTC+1 (GMT +1)

Goma Tsé-Tsé is a district in the Pool Department of Republic of the Congo.
