= Union for Progress (Republic of the Congo) =

Political party in the Republic of the Congo

The Union for Progress (Union pour le Progrès, UP) is a political party in the Republic of the Congo. In the parliamentary election held on June 24 and August 5, 2007, the party won 2 out of 137 seats. Jean-Martin Mbemba, who currently serves in the government as Minister of State for the Civil Service and State Reform, has been the President of the UP since it was founded in October 1990.
