= Union for Democratic Renewal (Republic of the Congo) =

The Union for Democratic Renewal (Union pour la Renouveau Démocratique) was a coalition of political parties in the Republic of the Congo. The coalition was led by Bernard Kolélas, who was also the leader of the coalition's largest party, the Congolese Movement for Democracy and Integral Development (MCDDI). The URD parties supported the transitional government of Prime Minister André Milongo (1991–1992) and opposed the National Alliance for Democracy (AND), which included the Pan-African Union for Social Democracy (UPADS) and the Congolese Labour Party (PCT). In the parliamentary election held in June–July 1992, the AND parties won a slight majority of seats in the National Assembly and UPADS leader Pascal Lissouba was victorious over Kolélas in the August 1992 presidential election.

Following the 1992 parliamentary election, the seven URD parties held 40 out of 125 seats in the National Assembly. After Lissouba took office, he gave the PCT only a small portion of positions in the government, causing the PCT to break with Lissouba and ally with URD instead; therefore, the URD and PCT together gained a parliamentary majority, enabling it to force out the government appointed by Lissouba. Lissouba consequently dissolved the National Assembly and called for a new parliamentary election, and after protests occurred, Lissouba accepted the formation of a national unity government in the lead-up to the election, with most of its positions going to the URD and PCT. In the new election, however, the pro-Lissouba alliance was victorious, and the URD and PCT alleged fraud.

Four members of the URD were included in the government of Prime Minister Joachim Yhombi-Opango that was named on January 23, 1995. These included Col. Philippe Bikinkita as Minister of the Interior in charge of Security and Urban Development, along with three Minister-Delegates.

The Rally for Democracy and Social Progress (RDPS) was part of the URD, as was the National Party (PANA), the Patriotic Union for Democracy and Progress (UPDP), and the Congolese Social Democratic Party (PSDC).
