= 1992 Republic of the Congo parliamentary election =

Election in the Republic of the Congo

Parliamentary elections were held in the Republic of the Congo in 1992, along with a presidential election, marking the end of the transition to multiparty politics. They were the first multiparty elections held in the country since the pre-independence elections of 1959.

The election was held in two rounds, the first on 24 June 1992 and the second on 19 July 1992. The Pan-African Union for Social Democracy (UPADS)—led by Pascal Lissouba, who won the presidential election—won a plurality of seats (39), while the Congolese Movement for Democracy and Integral Development (MCDDI) of second place presidential candidate Bernard Kolélas won the second highest number of seats (29). Following in third place was the Congolese Labor Party (PCT), which had been the ruling party during single-party rule.

The PCT backed Lissouba at the time of the election, giving the pro-Lissouba National Alliance for Democracy (AND) coalition a slight parliamentary majority (64 out of 125 seats). However, when Lissouba gave the PCT only three posts in the 28-member government he appointed in September 1992, the PCT (which wanted one-third of the portfolios) broke with Lissouba and instead allied with the Union for Democratic Renewal (URD) opposition coalition, which was led by Kolélas. This defection deprived Lissouba of his majority.

With an opposition majority in the National Assembly, the PCT's André Mouélé was elected as President of the National Assembly on September 24; the PCT and the URD formally signed an alliance on September 30. The opposition majority rejected the government appointed by Lissouba, which was led by Prime Minister Stéphane Maurice Bongho-Nouarra, in a vote of no confidence on October 31, and it demanded the appointment of a new Prime Minister from the parliamentary majority, as required by the constitution. Rather than do so, Lissouba dissolved the National Assembly. The URD and PCT protested this, and despite Lissouba's desire to leave Bongho-Nouarra in office during the interim period leading to a new election, he agreed under pressure to appoint a coalition government in which 60% of the posts were held by the URD and PCT (the "60/40" government of Prime Minister Claude Antoine Dacosta). Six months later, a new parliamentary election was held in June 1993.

== Results ==
Party	Seats	+/–
Pan-African Union for Social Democracy	39	New
Congolese Movement for Democracy and Integral Development	29	New
Congolese Party of Labour	18	–115
Rally for Democracy and Social Progress	9	New
Rally for Democracy and Development	5	New
Union of Democratic Forces	3	New
Union for Social Progress and Democracy	2	New
African Movement for Social Renaissance	1	New
National Party	1	New
Union for Christian Democracy	1	New
Democratic and Patriotic Forces	1	New
National Rally for Democracy and Progress	1	New
Union for Progress	1	New
Union for National Recovery	1	New
National Union for Democracy and Progress	1	New
National Committee for Democracy and Development	1	New
Republican Party for the Defence of Congo	1	New
National Democratic Alliance	1	New
Forum for Democracy and Solidarity	1	New
Independents	8	New
Total	125	–8
Source: Nohlen et al.
