= Lari people (Congo) =

Lari
Total population
- 1.2 million

Regions with significant populations
- Congo

Languages
- Ciladi and French

Religion
- Christianity, Traditional beliefs

Related ethnic groups
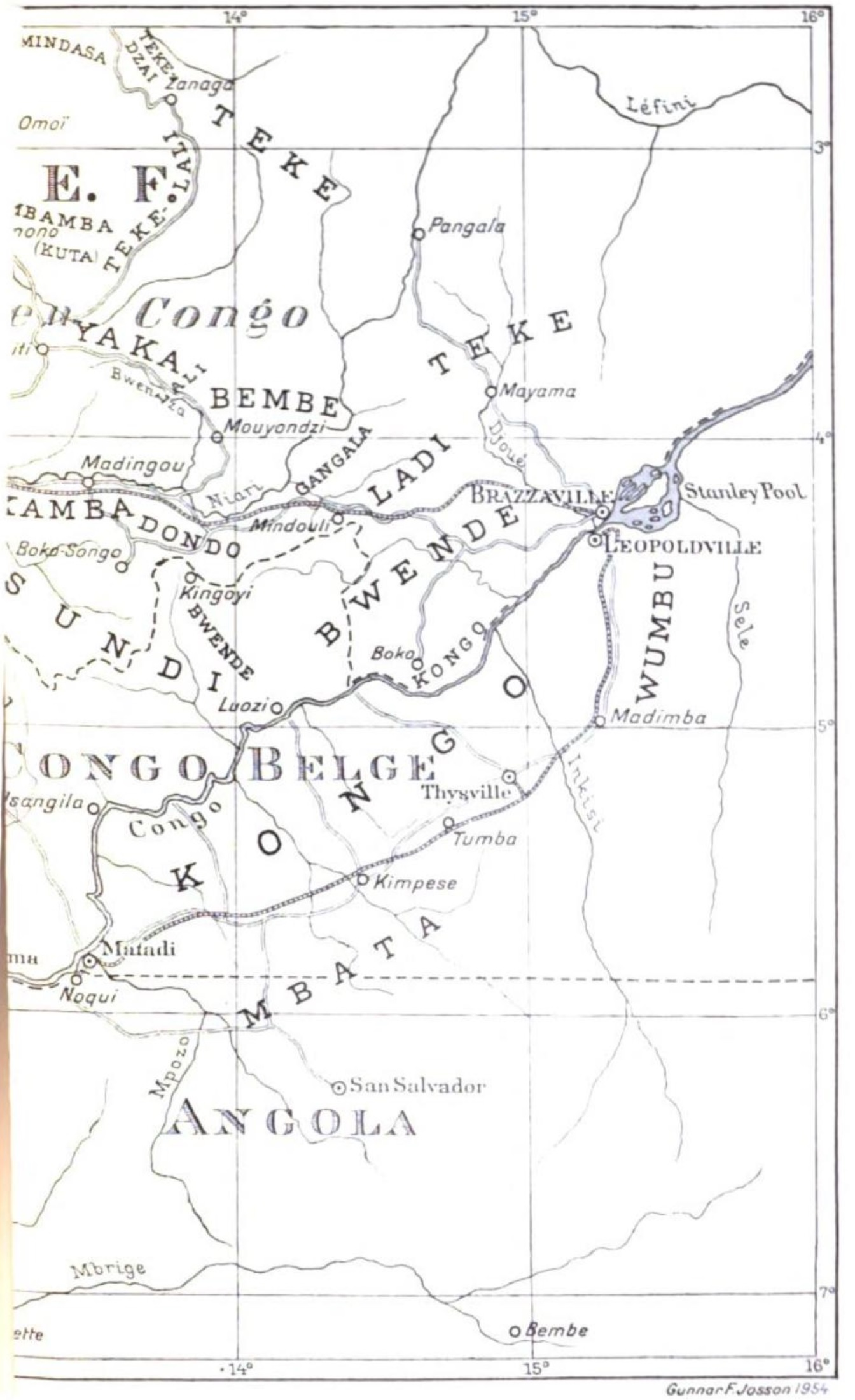
- Bakongo, Bateke

The Lari (alternatively Ladi, Laari, Laadi,, Baladi, Balaadi, Balari or Balaari) is an ethnic group of the Republic of the Congo and Democratic Republic of the Congo and the name of the language they speak. A subgroup of the Kongo people, the Lari live in the communes of Brazzaville, the capital; and Pointe-Noire, within the surrounding Pool Department and the Luozi Territory (Secteur Balari). This subgroup was born in the 19th century. There are an estimated 1.2 million Lari living in the Republic of Congo.

== History ==
The establishment of the capital Brazzaville by the French colonizer near the Kongo settlements led to the merging of several Kongo subgroups into a new group with a new identity. Indeed, towards the end of the nineteenth century, the Ladi (pronunciation: lari or ladi) are people from different Kongo subgroups (subgroups originating from the former province of the Kongo Kingdom « Nsundi »): Sundi, Buende, Manianga, Gangala (or Hangala).

With the rapid commercial and demographic expansion, Ladi became the Kongo vernacular between the different branches (Sundi, Manianga, Kongo (or Koongo) ba Nseke), reshaping the Kongo identity, following the colonial railroad. The clear delimitations between these branches are thus defined not by language but by mvila (clans) and region of origin (Mpangala, Mvula Ntangu or Mbula Ntangu, Manianga). In addition, there is old neighborhood with the Teke people, which is materialized by matrimonial alliances.

Several hypotheses have been put forward for the origin of the word ladi or lari, but it seems to be taken from the word Nladi, Muladi, M'ladi (translation: He or she who disappears (or loses), a word derived from the verb Lala disappear/lose in Kikongo, more specifically in Kimbata and Kitsotso) or from the Luladi or Lulari river (called Lelali by the Téké-Yaka), a river near Kimpanzu, the village of Malonga Mi Mpanzu alias Bueta Mbongo or Bweta Mbongo; Boueta Mbongo in French (about 1860–1898). He was a mfumu kanda and mfumu tsi/nsi (clan chief and land chief), of the mvila (clans) Mpanzu and Buende; his people and allies were thus designated bisi Buende, baBuende (in reference to the luvila (clan) Buende/Bwende). Him and Mabiala ma Nganga (Nsundi, Sundi or Suundi) organized armed resistance against the French colonial settlement from the late 1880s, and then he became the leading figure of the resistance after the death of Mabiala ma Nganga in 1896. After the death of Bueta Mbongo in 1898, the mfumu (chiefs) signed a surrender in 1899, accepting French authority in the region. In these years, the Buende ethnonym gradually disappeared, giving way to that of Ladi. Thus the Ladis are originally the bisi Buende or baBuende, a Sundi stictosensu and lato sensu subgroup. Later, other Kongos (Haangala, Sundi/Nsundi, etc.) from Nsundi were added. Some Tékés who remained in the Pool integrated into the Lari group through marriage alliances, cohabitation...

The term Kilari or Lari has been attested since the 17th century. In 1650, the missionary Joris Van Geel (Georges de Geel in French) mentioned in his accounts of the Kingdom of Kongo several villages, among them one called "Songa a Kilari".
