= 1992 Republic of the Congo presidential election =

- 8 August 1992 (first round); 16 August 1992 (second round)
- Turnout: 59.44% (first round); 61.61% (second round)
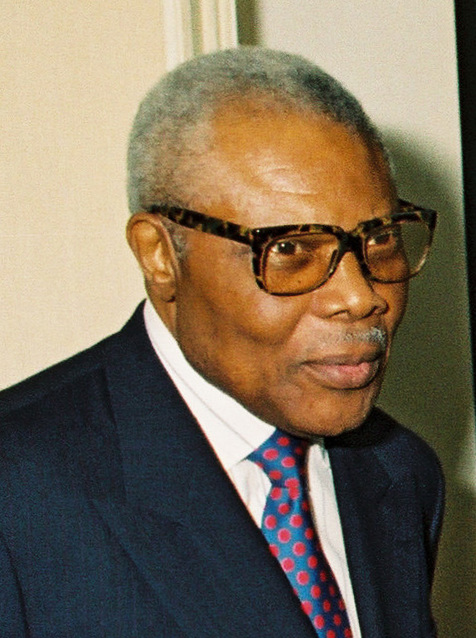

Nominee	Pascal Lissouba	Bernard Kolélas
Party	UPADS	MCDDI
Popular vote	506,395	319,396
Percentage	61.32%	38.68%
President before election
Denis Sassou Nguesso
PCT
Elected President
Pascal Lissouba
UPADS

Presidential elections were held in the Republic of the Congo in August 1992, marking the end of the transitional period that began with the February–June 1991 National Conference. It was won by Pascal Lissouba of the Pan-African Union for Social Democracy (UPADS), who defeated Bernard Kolélas of the Congolese Movement for Democracy and Integral Development (MCDDI) in a second round of voting.

In the first round, held on 8 August, Lissouba, who had served as prime minister in the 1960s, placed first with 36% of the vote, outperforming Kolélas, an opposition figure since the 1960s, who won 20%, and Denis Sassou-Nguesso of the former ruling party, the Congolese Labor Party (PCT), who won 17%. Sassou-Nguesso had been president since 1979 but only in a ceremonial capacity since the National Conference. Prime Minister André Milongo, who led the country during the transition but whose government had lost its responsibility for organizing the election after the local election of May 1992 proved controversial, ran as an independent candidate and placed fourth with 10%. Two former leading figures of the PCT, Jean-Pierre Thystère Tchicaya of the Rally for Democracy and Social Progress (RDPS) and Joachim Yhombi-Opango of the Rally for Democracy and Development (RDD), placed fifth and sixth with 6% and 3% respectively.

In the first round, Lissouba enjoyed overwhelming support in the three regions collectively known as Nibolek—Niari (88.7%), Bouenza (80.6%), and Lékoumou (91.7%). Kolélas won a first round majority only in the Pool Region (64.4%), although he also won a plurality in Brazzaville, the capital (29.9%). Sassou-Nguesso dominated the north, winning first round majorities in Plateaux (57.6%) and Likouala (58.5%) and pluralities in Cuvette (47.9%) and Sangha (41.9%). Tchicaya and Yhombi-Opango made strong showings in certain regions—the former won 28% of the vote (behind Lissouba's 40%) in Kouilou Region, which includes Pointe-Noire, the country's second largest city, and the latter won 27% of the vote in Cuvette Region.

With Sassou-Nguesso's support, Lissouba defeated Kolélas in the second round with 61% of the vote. Lissouba won all regions in the second round except Brazzaville, Pool, and Kouilou.

== Results ==
The official number of valid votes cast in the first round was reported to be 785,981, 1,900 higher than the total of votes received by each candidate. Voter turnout was reported to be 59.6% based on this figure.

Candidate	Party	First round		Second round	
Candidate	Party	Votes	%	Votes	%
Pascal Lissouba	Pan-African Union for Social Democracy	282,020	35.97	506,395	61.32
Bernard Kolélas	Congolese Movement for Democracy and Integral Development	159,682	20.37	319,396	38.68
Denis Sassou-Nguesso	Congolese Party of Labour	131,346	16.75		
André Milongo	Independent	79,979	10.20		
Jean-Pierre Thystère Tchicaya	Rally for Democracy and Social Progress	45,466	5.80		
Joachim Yhombi-Opango	Rally for Democracy and Development	27,953	3.57		
Charles David Ganao	Union of Democratic Forces	22,514	2.87		
Paul Kaya	Independent	15,277	1.95		
Gongarad N'koua	Patriotic Union for Democracy and Progress	5,272	0.67		
Clement Mierassa	Congolese Social Democratic Party	4,298	0.55		
Jean-Martin M'bembé	Union for Progress	3,558	0.45		
Alphonse Souchlaty Poaty	Republican Union for Progress	2,378	0.30		
Gabriel Bokilo	Union for National Recovery	2,296	0.29		
Angèle Bandou	RDPSEL	980	0.12		
Makangou Loukamy	Friendly Union for Complete Change	649	0.08		
Corentin Auguste Kouba	Rally for Unity, Democracy and Liberty	413	0.05		
Total		784,081	100.00	825,791	100.00
Valid votes		784,081	98.97	825,791	99.27
Invalid/blank votes		8,200	1.03	6,036	0.73
Total votes		792,281	100.00	831,827	100.00
Registered voters/turnout		1,332,821	59.44	1,350,241	61.61
Source: Nohlen et al.
