= Claude Antoine Dacosta =

Prime Minister of the Republic of the Congo (1932–2007)

Claude Antoine Dacosta (28 February 1932 – 1 May 2007) was a Congolese politician who served as the Prime Minister of the Republic of the Congo from December 6, 1992, until June 23, 1993.

Political offices
Preceded by Stéphane Maurice Bongho-Nouarra	Prime Minister of Congo-Brazzaville; 1992-1993	Succeeded by Joachim Yhombi-Opango
