= Pan-African Union for Social Democracy =

Political party in the Republic of the Congo

Pan-African Union for Social Democracy Union panafricaine pour la démocratie sociale
- Abbreviation: UPADS
- Secretary-General: Pascal Tsaty Mabiala
- Founded: 1991
- Ideology: Social democracy Pan-Africanism
- Political position: Centre-left
- International affiliation: Progressive Alliance
- Seats in the National Assembly: 8 / 151
- Seats in the Senate: 2 / 72

Website
- lecru-upads-usa.org

The Pan-African Union for Social Democracy (French: Union panafricaine pour la démocratie sociale, UPADS) is a political party in the Republic of the Congo that was headed by Pascal Lissouba, who was President from 1992 to 1997. It has been the country's main opposition party since Lissouba's ouster in 1997. Pascal Tsaty-Mabiala has been Secretary-General of UPADS since 2006.

== History ==
In the 1991–1992 transition to multiparty elections, UPADS was part of the National Alliance for Democracy (AND), which also included the Congolese Labour Party (PCT). In the parliamentary election held in June–July 1992, UPADS won 39 out of the 125 seats and, together with its AND allies (mainly the PCT), gained a slight majority of 64 seats in the National Assembly. UPADS leader Pascal Lissouba was victorious over Bernard Kolélas, the leader of the Congolese Movement for Democracy and Integral Development (MCDDI), in the second round of the August 1992 presidential election, winning 61.32% of the vote.

A UPADS-led government, with Stéphane Maurice Bongho-Nouarra as prime minister, was appointed after Lissouba took office, but the PCT withdrew from the pro-Lissouba alliance and joined the opposition after it received only three positions in the government, causing the alliance to lose its parliamentary majority. The Union for Democratic Renewal (URD) opposition coalition and the PCT were therefore successful in defeating Bongho-Nouarra's government in a no-confidence vote on 31 October 1992. Lissouba consequently dissolved the National Assembly and called a new election; facing protests about this, he accepted the formation of a national unity government dominated by the URD and PCT in the lead-up to the election. In the 1993 parliamentary election, the Presidential Tendency, of which UPADS was the main component, won a majority of the seats decided in the first round, 62 out of 114; UPADS itself won 49 out of the 62. The URD and PCT opposition denounced this election as fraudulent and refused to participate in the second round, in which the Presidential Tendency won an additional seven seats; however, these results were cancelled and a second round revote was held in October 1993, in which the Presidential Tendency won only three of the 11 available seats.

Lissouba was ousted at the end of a civil war in 1997 and fled into exile, while Denis Sassou Nguesso of the PCT became president. A faction of UPADS, led by Martin Mberi, recognized the legitimacy of Sassou Nguesso, and Mberi was included in the government from 1997 to June 2001 as Minister of Construction.

Joseph Kignoumbi Kia Mboungou was the UPADS presidential candidate in the presidential election held on 10 March 2002; he took second place but received only 2.76% of the vote, with Sassou Nguesso winning by an overwhelming margin according to official results. In the parliamentary election held on 26 May and 23 June 2002, UPADS won two out of 137 seats.

The party's first extraordinary congress was held on 27–28 December 2006, with 954 delegates. On this occasion Pascal Tsaty-Mabiala was elected as the Secretary-General of the party, succeeding Christophe Moukouéké. Also elected at the congress were a 601-member National Council, a 135-member Political Bureau, and 25 Vice-Presidents; the Vice-Presidents included major figures in the party such as Joseph Kignoumbi Kia Mboungou, Alphonse Poaty-Souchlaty, Ange Edouard Poungui, Clément Mouamba, Jean Itadi, and Mireille Lissouba.

Despite being in the opposition, UPADS chose to participate in the June 2007 parliamentary election, which was boycotted by many other opposition groups. The party put forward about 50 candidates. The party received three seats out the 46 declared in the first round. Tsaty-Mabiala said that the party would only participate in the second round of the election in July if the electoral rolls were improved, voter registration cards were properly distributed, and the composition of the electoral commissions was changed. He also said that the second round should be delayed to allow time for these things to be done. The election was delayed by two weeks.

In results announced after the second round, the party had a total of 10 seats in the National Assembly. Tsaty-Mabiala denounced the results as fraudulent on 11 August and said that the election was neither transparent nor fair. He alleged that five UPADS candidates, in Mossendjo, Moutamba, Nkayi, Mabombo and Dolisie electoral districts, had won but were deprived of victory in the results. The party appealed to the Constitutional Court. Ibovi subsequently announced a correction in the results for one of the electoral districts UPADS claimed to have won, Mabombo (in Bouenza Region), which had gone to Marcel Kalla in the previous results, but which Ibovi said was actually won by the UPADS candidate, Christophe Moukouéké. This raised the number of UPADS seats to 11.

In early October 2007, Tsaty-Mabiala said that UPADS would not participate in any national unity government because there had not been an agreement on resolving the country's problems.

At a meeting on 24–25 August 2008, the UPADS Political Bureau expelled nine executive members from the party; these included Christophe Moukouéké and Victor Tamba-Tamba, both founding members of UPADS. This decision was said to have been taken in order to restore harmony and discipline within the party.

Along with the Union for Democracy and the Republic (UDR-Mwinda) and the Rally for Democracy and Development (RDD), UPADS formed the Alliance for the New Republic opposition coalition on 11 May 2007. Complaining that the 2007 parliamentary election and the 2008 local elections were "masquerades", this coalition withdrew from participation in national and local electoral commissions in August 2008. It wanted a new and independent electoral commission, in addition to an "all-inclusive national dialogue" prior to the 2009 presidential election.

Former Prime Minister Ange Edouard Poungui was chosen as the UPADS candidate for the 2009 presidential election by the UPADS National Council in a primary election on 30 November 2008. His sole rival for the nomination, Joseph Kignoumbi Kia Mboungou, withdrew from the vote, complaining of "lack of transparency in the process", and Poungui, as the only candidate, received about 85% of the vote. However its candidacy was later rejected by the Constitutional Court on the ground that he had failed to establish his continuous residency in Congo-Brazzaville for at least two years.

In the three following parliamentary elections, always under the leadership of Pascal Tsaty Mabiala, UPADS never managed to weaken PCT's absolute majority, remaining the main opposition force (tied with UDH-Yuki in 2017 and 2022) but always obtaining between 7 and 8 seats. Tsaty Mabiala was also the party's presidential candidate for the 2016 presidential election, finishing fourth with 4.67% of the votes, while the party did not contest the following presidential election in 2021.

== Electoral history ==
=== Presidential elections ===
Election	Candidate	First round		Second round		Results
Election	Candidate	Votes	%	Votes	%	Results
1992	Pascal Lissouba	282,020	35.97%	506,395	61.32%	Elected ✓
2002	Kignomba Kia Mbougou	33.154	2.76%			Lost ✗
2009	Candidate rejected					
2016	Pascal Tsaty Mabiala	65,025	4.67%			Lost ✗

=== National Assembly elections ===
Election	Party leader	Votes	%	Seats	+/–	Position	Result
1992	Pascal Lissouba			39 / 125	▲39	▲1st	Snap elections
1993	Pascal Lissouba			47 / 101	▲8	1st	Coalition
2002	Kignomba Kia Mbougou			3 / 137	▼44	▼4th	Opposition
2007	Pascal Tsaty Mabiala			11 / 137	▲8	▲3rd	Opposition
2012	Pascal Tsaty Mabiala			7 / 139	▼4	3rd	Opposition
2017	Pascal Tsaty Mabiala			8 / 151	▲1	▲2nd	Opposition
2022	Pascal Tsaty Mabiala			7 / 151	▼1	2nd	Opposition
