= Bernard Kolélas =

Prime Minister of the Republic of the Congo (1933–2009)

Bernard Bakana Kolélas (12 June 1933 – 13 November 2009) was a Congolese politician and President of the Congolese Movement for Democracy and Integral Development (MCDDI). Kolélas was a long-time opponent of the single-party rule of the Congolese Labour Party (PCT), and after the introduction of multiparty politics in the early 1990s he was one of Congo-Brazzaville's most important political leaders. He placed second in the August 1992 presidential election, behind Pascal Lissouba; subsequently he was mayor of Brazzaville, the capital, during the mid-1990s, and he briefly served as Prime Minister of Congo-Brazzaville during the 1997 civil war. After rebel forces prevailed in the civil war, he lived in exile for eight years until an amnesty made it possible for him to return; he was then elected to the National Assembly in 2007.

== Education and early political career ==
A native of Congo-Brazzaville's Pool Region, Kolélas was born at Mboloki (Mpayaka), located in the Pool's Kinkala District, in 1933. He attended primary and secondary school in the nearby administrative capital of Brazzaville. He joined the Union for the Defense of the Interests of Africans (UDDIA) in 1958. Under Fulbert Youlou, who was Congo-Brazzaville's first President, Kolélas worked for a time as Secretary-General of the Ministry of Foreign Affairs in 1961. After Youlou was ousted and Alphonse Massemba-Débat took power in August 1963, Kolélas was appointed as Minister of Foreign Affairs, but he preferred that the post should go to David Charles Ganao and chose not to accept it. Kolélas was arrested in September 1963 and spent one month in detention. He was arrested again in February 1964, but was freed at the request of Prime Minister Pascal Lissouba. He then went into exile across the Congo River in Kinshasa, the capital of the Democratic Republic of the Congo, and founded an opposition newspaper, La Résistance.

== Activities during PCT rule ==
In November 1969, Kolélas unsuccessfully attempted a coup d'état against President Marien Ngouabi. He was sentenced to death, but was granted a reprieve and subsequently released on 1 January 1972 and put. He was again arrested in connection with another plot in August 1978 and was released in 1980. Afterwards he lived in Brazzaville's Bacongo district. He sent letters to President Denis Sassou Nguesso on 7 November 1988 and 20 November 1989, proposing a national roundtable discussion on the country's problems.

== MCDDI and URD ==
Kolélas later founded a political party, the MCDDI; its statutes were deposited at the Ministry of the Interior on 3 August 1989. In the June–July 1992 parliamentary election, he was elected to the National Assembly as the MCDDI candidate in Goma Tsé-Tsé constituency, located in the Pool Region. Kolélas then stood as the MCDDI candidate in the August 1992 presidential election, placing second. In the first round he won 20.32% of the vote, behind Pascal Lissouba of the Pan-African Union for Social Democracy (UPADS) and ahead of the PCT candidate, President Sassou Nguesso. His support was strongest in the Pool Region, where he won 64.4% of the vote in the first round; he did not win a first round majority in any other region, although he placed first in Brazzaville with 29.9% of the vote. In the second round, the PCT backed Lissouba and Kolélas was defeated, taking 38.68% of the vote; he won second round majorities in the Pool Region (88.71%), Brazzaville (56.80%), and Kouilou Region (50.77%) but fared very poorly in the rest of the country.

A period of instability in Congolese politics followed the 1992 election. Kolélas led an opposition coalition, the Union for Democratic Renewal (URD), in alliance with the PCT, despite Kolélas' prior opposition to the PCT. The conflict between the government and the opposition became more severe following the May–June 1993 parliamentary election, and about 2,000 people were killed in serious political violence from 1993 to 1994. In January 1994, the army blockaded the Bacongo district of Brazzaville, the stronghold of Kolélas' Ninja militia, and attacked the Ninjas with heavy weaponry. Following an agreement on 30 January 1994, the violence was reduced, and Lissouba and Kolélas publicly reconciled in June 1994. In July 1994, Kolélas was elected as Mayor of Brazzaville.

== 1997 civil war ==
During the 1997 civil war, Kolélas was President of the National Mediation Committee. President Lissouba, seeking to secure his position and resolve the conflict by bringing his opponents into the government, appointed Kolélas as Prime Minister at the head of a government of national unity in September 1997. The government under Kolélas was composed of 41 members; although the rebel coalition loyal to Sassou Nguesso was offered some portfolios in the government, it rejected the offer.

Lissouba and Kolélas were ousted and forced into exile when forces loyal to Sassou-Nguesso captured Brazzaville on October 14, 1997. Ninja rebels loyal to Kolélas continued to fight for some time afterwards. In November 1998, Kolélas spurned a government offer of dialogue. Pro-Kolélas rebels unsuccessfully attempted to seize Brazzaville in December 1998, and Kolélas, who was in the United States at the time, claimed that his forces were effectively in control of the city, while suggesting that he might return home to lead the country. The government rejected Kolélas' claim and said that the army had the upper hand. A few days later, Kolélas described the rebellion as an uprising of the youth, and he said that it had only been defeated due to intervention by Angolan troops on the side of the government.

== Exile and return ==
On May 4, 2000, Kolélas was sentenced to death in absentia by a Congolese court for illegal arrests, abductions, and rape. In October 2005, he returned to Congo from exile to attend the funeral of his wife, Jacqueline; Sassou Nguesso granted Kolélas a special amnesty for the occasion on humanitarian grounds, enabling him to visit. In the Bacongo district of Brazzaville, excitement led to clashes between his supporters and the police on October 13, immediately prior to his return. The National Assembly unanimously adopted a law granting an amnesty to Kolélas on November 23, 2005.

On behalf of his party, Kolélas signed an agreement on the creation of an electoral alliance between the MCDDI and the PCT on April 24, 2007. In the subsequent 2007 parliamentary election, Kolélas was elected to the National Assembly as the MCDDI candidate in Goma Tsé-Tsé constituency; facing two challengers, he won the seat in the first round with 86.44% of the vote. As the oldest Deputy in the National Assembly, he presided over the first meeting of the newly elected National Assembly, at which the bureau of the National Assembly was elected, on September 4, 2007.

Reportedly suffering from Alzheimer's disease, Kolélas was hospitalized in Paris in late 2007. In 2009, he spent several months in Paris for medical treatment before dying there in the early hours of 13 November 2009 at the age of 76.

Political offices
Preceded by Charles David Ganao	Prime Minister of Congo-Brazzaville; 1997	Succeeded by Position abolished
