= 1993 Republic of the Congo parliamentary election =

Parliamentary elections were held in the Republic of the Congo on 2 May 1993, with a second round in several constituencies on 6 June. The result was a victory for the Presidential Tendency coalition, which won 65 of the 125 seats in the National Assembly. Former President Joachim Yhombi-Opango was appointed as Prime Minister.

== Results ==
Party	Seats	+/–
Pan-African Union for Social Democracy	47	+8
Congolese Movement for Democracy and Integral Development	28	–1
Congolese Party of Labour	15	–3
Rally for Democracy and Social Progress	10	+1
Rally for Democracy and Development	6	+1
Union of Democratic Forces	3	0
Congolese Party of Renewal	2	New
Union for Democracy and the Republic	2	New
Union for Democratic Renewal	2	New
Union for Development and Social Progress	1	New
Union for Congolese Democracy	1	New
Patriotic Union for National Renewal	1	New
Other parties	5	–
Pro-PCT independents	1	–
Independents	1	–7
Total	125	0
Source: African Elections Database
