= Republic of the Congo Civil War (1997–1999) =

Ethno-political conflict in the Republic of the Congo

Second Republic of the Congo Civil War
- Part of the aftermaths of the First Congo War and Rwandan genocide
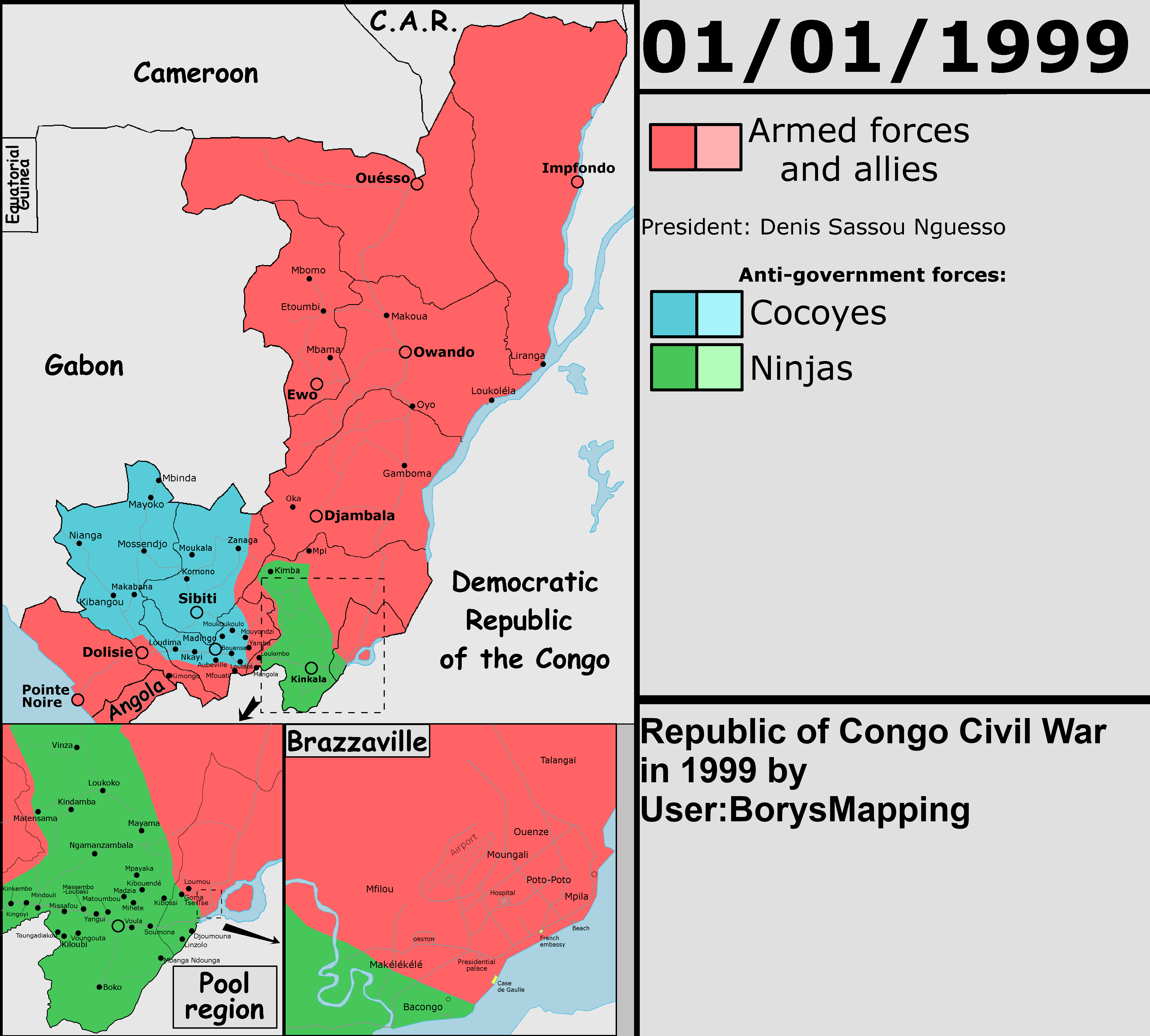
Date	5 June 1997 – 29 December 1999 (2 years, 6 months and 24 days)
Location	Republic of the Congo
Result	Nguesso loyalist victory; Denis Sassou Nguesso returns to power

Belligerents
Armed Forces of the Republic of the Congo (to October 1997); Cocoye Militia; Ninja Militia; Nsiloulou; Supported by: DR Congo; FLEC; UNITA	Armed Forces of the Republic of the Congo (from October 1997); Cobra Militia (Rwanda) Rwandan Hutu Militia; Angola; Chad

Commanders and leaders
(Republic of the Congo) Pascal Lissouba (Republic of the Congo) Bernard Kolelas; Jonas Savimbi	Denis Sassou Nguesso (Angola) José Eduardo dos Santos (Chad) Idriss Déby

Strength
3,000 Cocoye Militia; 16,000 Ninja Militia; 200–300 FARDC	8,000 Cobra Militia; 2,500 Angolan Armed Forces; 600 Rwandan Hutu Militia

Casualties and losses
- 13,929–25,050 total deaths. Over 200,000 internally displaced and 6,000 foreign refugees.

The Second Republic of the Congo Civil War, also known as the Second Brazzaville-Congolese Civil War, was the second of two ethnopolitical civil conflicts in the Republic of the Congo which lasted from 5 June 1997 to 29 December 1999. The war served as the continuation of the civil war of 1993–1994 and involved militias representing three political candidates. The conflict ended following the intervention of the Angolan military, which reinstated former president Denis Sassou Nguesso to power.

== Background ==
The Republic of the Congo (Congo-Brazzaville) gained its independence from France in 1960, and soon entered a period of political turbulence. Following a three-day uprising in 1963, the Congo fell under the influence of scientific socialism, establishing relations with the Eastern Bloc and becoming a single-party People's Republic. Two regime changes took place as the country faced a rise in ethnic tensions, with Denis Sassou Nguesso assuming presidency in 1979. In 1990, the country made its first steps towards a multiparty political system, eventually leading to the 1992 general elections.

The elections concluded with Pan-African Union for Social Democracy (UPADS) candidate Pascal Lissouba winning the presidential race, Congolese Movement for Democracy and Integral Development's (MCDDI) Bernard Kolelas coming second, and Congolese Labor Party's (PCT) Sassou Nguesso running third. Kolelas and Sassou Nguesso were dissatisfied with the outcome of the elections, and created an alliance against Lissouba. Tensions continued to rise as Kolelas, Lissouba and Sassou formed the Ninja, Cocoye, and Cobra militia respectively. The militia drew members from their leaders' ethnic and political backgrounds: the Mbochi supported Sassou, and the Nibolek and the Lari sided with Lissouba and Kolelas respectively.

Citing electoral fraud during the 1993 parliamentary elections, the Ninja and Cobra militia launched a civil war against the Cocoye. The conflict ended in December 1994, leaving 2,000 people dead and many more displaced. Despite remaining in power, Lissouba failed to fully implement the peace accords signed at the end of the war, as the country's militias retained their weapons. High unemployment rates, an atmosphere of political uncertainty, and the steady flow of firearms coming from regional conflicts contributed to the rise of the militia movement within the country. Violent disputes continued with each faction preparing for the upcoming 1997 elections.

== Conflict ==
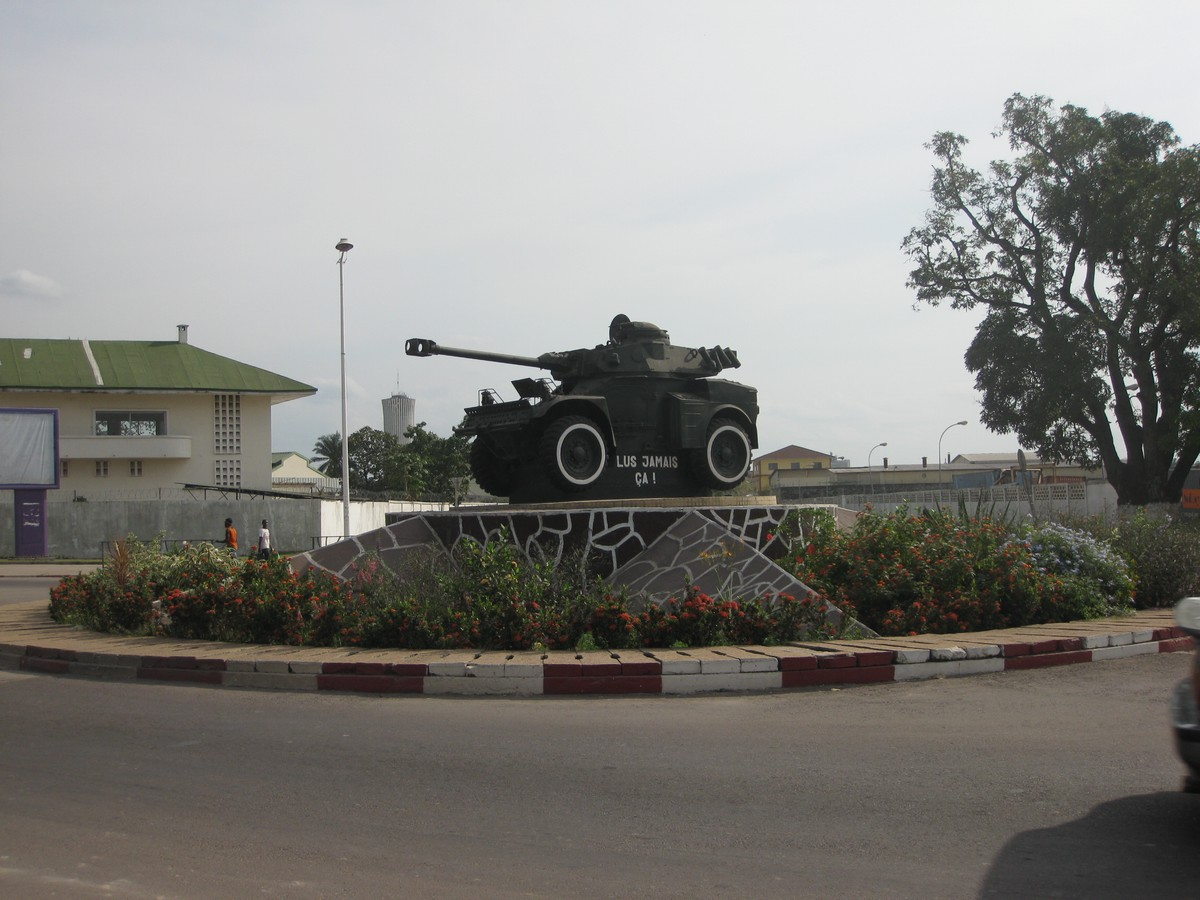
An Eland Mk7 armoured car standing in front of the presidential palace as a memorial of the 5 June 1997 events.

On 5 June 1997, anticipating a Sassou-led coup, Lissouba ordered the Cocoye militia to detain Sassou and forcibly disarm the Cobra militia, thus initiating a second civil war. Fighting soon engulfed the whole city, with the Cobra, Cocoye and Ninja militias each controlling areas within the capital. The government recruited Ukrainian mercenaries to fly attack helicopters, later mobilizing them in a bombing campaign of Cobra-controlled areas. Both sides actively shelled densely populated areas, causing a high civilian death toll. Combatants engaged in numerous instances of extortion and harassment of the civilian population, selecting their targets on the basis of ethnicity.

On 16 June 1997, Lissouba and Sassou-Nguesso unsuccessfully held talks in Libreville, Gabon, organized with the mediation of the United Nations, the European Union, France and a number of African countries. On 17 June 1997, French soldiers and a number of US Marine Corps troops present in the capital conducted a joint operation, evacuating 6,000 foreign citizens through the Brazzaville Airport as warring parties agreed to a three-day ceasefire in the area.

At the same time Lissouba personally visited Rwanda, Uganda and Namibia, attempting to gain the support of their leaders. He publicly accused the Cobra of employing supporters of former Zairian president Mobutu Sese Seko, prompting the president of the Democratic Republic of the Congo (DRC), Laurent Kabila, to send several hundred soldiers to Lissouba's aid. "On 29 September 1997, shells have fallen in several districts of Kinshasa left twenty-one dead. For forty-eight hours, the army of Kinshasa responded by firing at Brazzaville "more than a hundred shells", according to residents of the Congolese capital. They indicated that Kabila's artillery fired both on the North, under the control of General Sassou N'Guesso, and on the South, in the hands of supporters of President Lissouba. "They even bombarded the presidential palace" said a source, who confirmed that "this is where several shots came from on Monday." "

The outbreak of the Congolese civil war coincided with the ongoing internal conflict in Angola. During the presidency of Pascal Lissouba, Congo provided active support to the anti-government UNITA guerrillas, who supplied Congo with diamonds. Angola seized the opportunity to destroy UNITA's last supply line by entering the conflict on Sassou-Nguesso's side. France also supported the Cobra militia by offering armaments, aiming to secure its interests in the country's oil industry.

The conflict was also influenced by the aftermaths of the First Congo War and of the Rwandan genocide. A large number of Rwandan refugees who fled the DRC (formerly Zaire) in May 1997 after the fall of Mobutu, took part in the conflict—approximately 600 Rwandans Hutus joined militias formed by Sassou, with others fighting against him.

Allegations regarding the involvement of Cuba on the side of the Cobras have been made, with others accusing UNITA of aiding the Ninja militia.

In September 1997, following Sassou's refusal to accept five ministerial portfolios, Lissouba granted Bernard Kolelas the position of Prime Minister, as the Ninja militia officially entered the conflict on the side of the government.

Between 11–12 October 1997, Angolan air force fighter jets conducted a number of air strikes on Cocoye positions within the capital Brazzaville. On 16 October 1997 Cobra militia supported by tanks and a force of 1,000 Angolan troops cemented their control of Brazzaville, having ousted Lissouba two days earlier. Denis Sassou Nguesso assumed power on the following day, declaring himself president. He effectively incorporated the Cobra militia into the national army, without fully disbanding them. After capturing the capital, Cobra militiamen spread out over the city, detaining and executing dozens of enemy combatants and political opponents and looting their property. A parallel Angolan offensive on Pointe-Noire met with little resistance, as the majority of government troops surrendered.

Forced out of Brazzaville, Cocoye and Ninja fighters regrouped, initiating clashes in the northern cities of Impfondo, Ouesso and Owando as well as Pointe-Noire. In April 1998 Cocoye insurgents captured the Moukoukoulou Hydroelectric Dam located in the Bouenza department, killing several employees and cutting off the electric supply to Pointe-Noire for several weeks. On 29 August 1998 Ninja guerrillas killed the police commissioner of Mindouli. On 26 September 1998 Ninja rebels assassinated the deputy prefect of Goma Tse Tse. On 9 October 1998 Ninja rebels set fire to the police station and prefecture offices of Kinkala.

The Ntsiloulou militia was formed in the Pool department in 1998, with the ethnic Lari forming the backbone of the group. It allied itself with the Ninja militia, launching attacks against government troops and their civilian supporters.

The last quarter of 1998 marked an escalation in the conflict, as Ninja and Nsiloulou militia seized control of several areas in the south of the country. On 14 November 1998 Ninja militants launched an attack on Mindouli, killing 41 civilians, including six members of a local mediation committee. On 18 December 1998 Cocoye rebels captured the town of Nkayi, conducting summary executions of government officials and ethnic Mbochis; government forces regained control of the town three days later. Elements of the Chadian and Angolan armies were deployed to the areas of Bouenza, Niari and Lekoumou as well as the Pool department, aiming to counter increased rebel activity.

On 16 December 1998 a band of 300 Ninja militants infiltrated the Bacongo and Makelekele neighborhoods of Brazzaville, starting clashes that lasted four days. The areas were targeted by heavy mortar and artillery shelling which caused widespread destruction, internally displacing 200,000 civilians. Widespread looting and summary executions were carried out by government forces following the conclusion of the engagement, which left at least 1000 people dead.

On 29 December 1999, amidst continuous government offensives, a total of 2,000 Ninja and Cocoye rebels surrendered to the authorities after signing a peace agreement with the government, officially ending the conflict.

== Helicopter affair ==
On 1 June 1997, in preparation for the upcoming war, President Lissouba approved the purchase of 28 South African Air Force Aérospatiale SA 330 Puma helicopters. All transactions were conducted through a Johannesburg-based businessman, with funds being sent to the offshore accounts of three other South African businessmen. The offshore accounts were managed by the BVI-based Exotek Management Services, which in turn acted as a middleman of Armscor, the owner of the equipment. Several weeks after the start of the war Lissouba ordered two Mil Mi-17 helicopters, four transport aircraft and 290 trucks, while initiating payments through a Paris bank account.

On 27 June 1997 a $1-million payment was received by Lissouba's South African partner, who in turn delivered two Mil Mi-17 helicopters to Lissoba's troops. On 11 July 1997 the Congolese government paid a total of $7.7 million for the 28 helicopters. In October 1997, having ousted Lissouba and assumed power, Sassou-Nguesso sent invoices to Exotek stating that all contracts and payments remained in force. The 28 Puma helicopters remained undelivered, as Exotek and Armscor blamed each other for the failure. In 2002 the Congolese government sued Armscor in a South African court, demanding the repayment of $7.7 million; the case was later settled out of court.

== See also ==
- Republic of the Congo Civil War (1993–1994)
- Angolan Civil War
