= Pascal Lissouba =

Congolese politician (1931–2020)

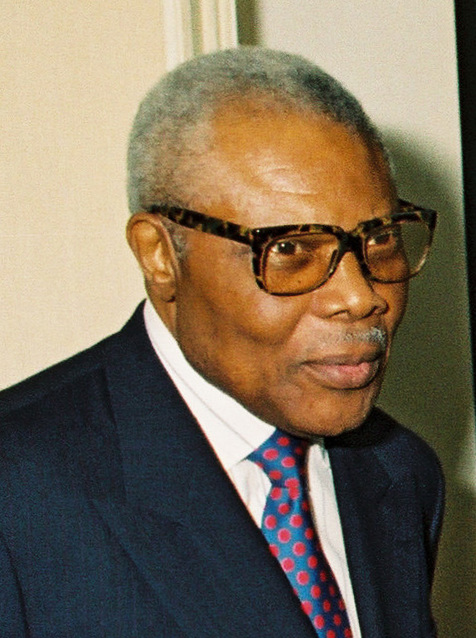
- Lissouba in 1995

6th President of the Republic of the Congo
- In office 31 August 1992 – 25 October 1997
- Prime Minister: André Milongo; Stéphane Maurice Bongho-Nouarra; Claude Antoine Dacosta; Joachim Yhombi-Opango; Charles David Ganao
- Preceded by: Denis Sassou Nguesso
- Succeeded by: Denis Sassou Nguesso

Prime Minister of the Republic of the Congo
- In office 24 December 1963 – 15 April 1966
- President: Alphonse Massamba-Débat
- Preceded by: Alphonse Massamba-Débat
- Succeeded by: Ambroise Noumazalaye

Personal details
- Born: 15 November 1931 Tsinguidi, French Congo, French Equatorial Africa
- Died: 24 August 2020 (aged 88) Perpignan, France
- Party: Pan-African Union for Social Democracy (from 1991)
- Other political affiliations: National Movement of the Revolution (1964–1969)
- Spouse(s): Annette Chantegreil; Jocelyne Rosdam
- Education: University of Paris

Pascal Lissouba (15 November 1931 – 24 August 2020) was a Congolese politician who was the first democratically elected President of the Republic of the Congo and served from 31 August 1992 until 25 October 1997. He was overthrown by his predecessor and current president Denis Sassou Nguesso in the 1997 civil war.

== Early life and education ==
Lissouba was born in Tsinguidi, south-west Congo, to Bandjabi parents. He attended primary school in Mossendjo and Boko. He began his secondary studies in Brazzaville and gained his education at the Lycée Félix Faure in Nice (1948–52), where he obtained a baccalaureate. He then studied Agronomy at the École Supérieure d'Agriculture in Tunis and secured a diploma in agricultural engineering in 1956. At the University of Paris (1958–61) he received a doctoral degree in biology. He was also a fellow trainee at the National Center for Scientific Research (CNRS) in Paris and at ORSTOM. In June 1961, he worked as a researcher at ORSTOM. He was appointed lecturer in plant biology by decree of the French Ministry of National Education on 3 November 1961.

== Political career ==
Initially he was a civil servant, working as a managing director in the Department of Agriculture (1962–63), having returned in 1962. But his abilities advanced him to become Minister of Agriculture, Livestock, Water, and Forestry on 16 August 1963 until 1966 and then Prime Minister (1963–66) under President Alphonse Massamba-Débat. He was appointed Minister of State for Planning, then for Agriculture (1968–1969), before being sacked by the government. Afterwards, he became a genetics professor at the University of Brazzaville (1966–1971) and later director of the Ecole Supérieure des Sciences in 1970. When Massamba-Débat was overthrown in 1968 Lissouba remained in government under Marien Ngouabi and although he was suspended from political activity from 1969 to 1971 he was on the Central Committee of the Congolese Workers Party in 1973.

In 1977, he was implicated for involvement in the assassination of Ngouabi and was arrested. He was sentenced to life imprisonment and hard labour in 1977. He was released in 1979 but had to live in exile in France from 1979 to 1990. In France, he was a professor of genetics at the University of Paris and then worked for UNESCO in Paris and Nairobi. When President Denis Sassou Nguesso was forced to move the Congo towards democracy in 1991, Lissouba returned in February 1992 and was elected president in the August 1992 elections. He secured 36% of the vote as head of the left-wing Pan-African Union for Social Democracy (Union panafricaine pour la démocratie sociale, UPADS). In the run-off with second-placed Bernard Kolelas, Lissouba got 61% of the vote.

== Unrest and civil war ==
Conflict soon broke out however. A coalition of opposition groups and their militias accused Lissouba of rigging the elections.

Fighting broke out again in June 1997 when Lissouba engaged militias loyal to former President Col. Denis Sassou Nguesso of the Congolese Labor Party (PCT) in Brazzaville, accusing the former president of an attempted coup. Sassou Nguesso, however, was able to escape and stage a counterattack. Thus began a 4-month civil war that destroyed or damaged much of the capital. In early October 1997, Angolan troops invaded Congo on the side of Sassou. Most of Brazzaville fell to rebel and Angolan forces on 14 October 1997, and Lissouba fled; within two days the capital was under the control of forces loyal to Sassou Nguesso, and Pointe-Noire fell with little resistance.

== Exile and trial ==
Following his overthrow, Lissouba lived in exile in London. He intended to return to the Congo for the 2002 elections, but in December 2001 he was tried in absentia in Brazzaville, and sentenced to 30 years forced labor for treason and corruption, related to a $150 million oil deal with the American company Occidental Petroleum. Since 2004, he had been living in Paris in exile.

== Personal life ==
He was first married to Annette Chantegreil (1933-2019), then to Jocelyne Rosdam, a French national and is the father of eleven children. His eldest daughter, Mireille Lissouba, was his chief of staff from 1993 to 1996, while his younger daughter, Danielle Bineka is a university professor and writer, both currently exiled in Canada. His mother, Marie Bouanga died in 1996.

== Death ==
Lissouba died in Perpignan, France, on 24 August 2020, due to complications from Alzheimer's disease, aged 88.

== See also ==
- Maurice Mavoungou
- Ferdinand Mbahou
- Republic of the Congo Civil War
- Pan-African Union for Social Democracy

Political offices
Preceded by Alphonse Massamba-Débat	Prime Minister of the Republic of the Congo; 1963–1966	Succeeded by Ambroise Noumazalaye
Preceded by Denis Sassou Nguesso	President of the Republic of the Congo; 1992–1997	Succeeded by Denis Sassou Nguesso
