= Parliament of the Republic of the Congo =

Legislative assembly of the Republic of the Congo

Parliament of the Republic of the Congo Parlement de la République du Congo

Type
- Type: Bicameral
- Houses: • Senate • National Assembly

History
- Founded: 1958; 68 years ago
- Preceded by: Moyen-Congo Representative Council

Leadership
- President of the Senate: Pierre Ngolo, PCT since 12 September 2017
- President of the National Assembly: Isidore Mvouba, PCT since 19 August 2017

Structure
- Seats: Senate: 72; National Assembly: 151
- Senate political groups: PCT (52); RDPS (3); MAR (2); Club 2002 (2); UPADS (1); PRL (1); UDLC (1); MCDDI (1); LCEM (1); Independents (7)
- National Assembly political groups: Government (120): PCT (112); MAR (4); Club 2002 (2); RDPS (2); Support (3): CPR (1); URDP (1); RC (1); Opposition (16): UPADS (7); UDH-Yuki (7); MUST (1); MCDDI (1); Others (12): PRL (2); DRD (2); APC (1); MDP (1); Independents (6)

Elections
- Senate voting system: First-past-the-post
- National Assembly voting system: Two-round system
- Last Senate election: 20 August 2023
- Last National Assembly election: 10 and 31 July 2022
- Next Senate election: 2029
- Next National Assembly election: 2027

Website
- senat.cg assemblee-nationale.cg

The Parliament of the Republic of the Congo consists of two chambers:

- The Senate (Upper Chamber)
- The National Assembly (Lower Chamber)

== See also ==
- Politics of the Republic of the Congo
- List of legislatures by country
