= List of political parties in the Republic of the Congo =

The Republic of the Congo (Brazzaville) is a one-party dominant state with the Congolese Labour Party in power. Opposition parties are allowed, but are widely considered to have no real chance of gaining power.

== List ==
=== Parliamentary parties with more than one seat ===
Party	Abbr.	Leader	Political position	Ideology	Assembly
Congolese Party of Labour; Parti congolais du travail	PCT	Denis Sassou Nguesso	Centre-left	Social democracy	112 / 151
Pan-African Union for Social Democracy; Union panafricaine pour la démocratie sociale	UPADS	Pascal Tsaty Mabiala	Centre-left	Social democracy; Pan-Africanism	7 / 151
Union of Humanist Democrats-Yuki; Union des démocrates et humanistes-Yuki	UDH-Yuki	Pascal Ngouanou	Centre-right	Economic liberalism	7 / 151
Action and Renewal Movement; Mouvement action et renouveau	MAR	Roland Bouiti-Viaudo	Centre-left	Social democracy	4 / 151
Republican and Liberal Party; Parti républicain libéral	PRL	Nicéphore Fylla de Saint-Eudes	Centre	Liberalism	2 / 151
Club 2002 – Party for the Unity and the Republic; Club 2002 – Parti pour l’Unité et la République	Club 2002	Juste Désiré Mondélé			2 / 151
Dynamic for the Republic and Recovery; Dynamique pour la République et le développement	DRD	Hellot Matson Mampouya	Centre-right	Social conservatism; Economic liberalism	2 / 151
Rally for Democracy and Social Progress; Rassemblement pour la démocratie et le progrès social	MAR	Jean-Marc Thystère Tchicaya	Centre		2 / 151
Union for the Reconstruction and Development of Congo; Union pour la reconstruction et le développement du Congo	URDC	Luc Adamo Matéta	Centre		1 / 151

=== Other parties ===
- Citizen Rally (Rassemblement Citoyen, RC)
- Congolese Movement for Democracy and Integral Development (Mouvement congolais pour la démocratie et le développement intégral, MCDDI)
- Convention for Democracy and Salvation (Convention pour la Démocratie et le Salut, CDS)
- Life Party (Parti la Vie)
- Movement for Democracy and Progress (Mouvement pour la démocratie et le progrès, MDP)
- Movement for Solidarity and Development (Mouvement pour la solidarité et le développement, MSD)
- Movement for Unity, Solidarity and Labour (Mouvement pour l'unité, la solidarité et le travail, MUST)
- New Democratic Forces (Forces démocratiques nouvelles, FDN)
- Patriotic Front (Front Patriotique, FP)
- Patriotic Union for Democracy and Progress (Union Patriotique pour la Démocratie et le Progrès, UPDP)
- Permanent Action for the Congo (Action permanente pour le Congo, APC)
- Perspectives and Realities Club (Club Perspectives et Réalités, (CPR)
- Rally for Democracy and Development (Rassemblement pour la démocratie et le développement, RDD)
- Republican and Liberal Party (Parti républicain libéral, (PRL)
- Union for Democracy and Republic (Union pour la Démocratie et la République-Mwinda, UDR-Mwinda)
- Union of Democratic Forces (Union des Forces Démocratiques, UFD)
- Union for Democratic Renewal (Union pour la Renouveau Démocratique, URD)
- Union for a People's Movement (Union pour un mouvement populaire, UMP)
- Union for Progress (Union pour le Progrès, UPP)
- Union for the Reconstruction and Development of Congo (Union pour la reconstruction et le développement du Congo, URDP)
- Union for the Republic (Union pour la République, UPR)
- United Democratic Forces (Forces Démocratiques Unies, FDU)
- Take Action for Congo (AGIR pour le Congo, AGIR)
- Youth in Movement (Jeunesse en Mouvement)
