= Politics of the Republic of the Congo =

Politics of the Republic of the Congo takes place in a framework of a unitary semi-presidential republic, whereby the President is the head of state and the Prime Minister is the head of government, of a pluriform multi-party system. Executive power is exercised by the President and the Government. Recently, following the approval of a new Constitution after a referendum in 2015, Congo became a semi-presidential republic after the creation of the post of prime minister who is responsible to the legislature, as well is the cabinet of the former. Legislative power is vested in both the Government and the two chambers of parliament.

Many countries have a semi-presidential republic and elections, examples of other countries than the Republic of the Congo include France, Peru, and Croatia. However, having semi-presidential republic does not necessarily mean that a country is a democracy. A central, but not the only, component of democracy is free and fair elections, where the population can hold accountable those in power. Data collected from Freedom House, shows that the country scored 2/40 on political rights, and 15/60 on civil liberties; however, more specifically, the country scored 0/4 on whether there were free and fair elections.

In terms of civil, political, and human rights, another tenant of democracy, another non-governmental organization, BTI, reports that the rule of law “only exists on paper” in the country; this follows suit from a report from Amnesty International, which documents how Alexandre Ibacka Dzabana and Ras le Bol, both human rights leaders in the country were arrested the day after they announced they would hold a press conference to denounce election irregularities that occurred.

== Executive branch ==
Main office-holders
Office	Name	Party	Since
President	Denis Sassou-Nguesso	Party of Labour	25 October 1997
Prime Minister	Anatole Collinet Makosso	Party of Labour	12 May 2021

== Legislative branch ==
The Parliament (Parlement) has two chambers. The National Assembly (Assemblée Nationale) elects its members to five-year terms in single-seat constituencies. The members of the Senate (Sénat) are elected for a six-year term by district, local and regional councils. The Republic of Congo is a one party dominant state with the Congolese Labour Party in power. Opposition parties are allowed, but are widely considered to have no real chance of gaining power.

== Political parties and elections ==
=== Presidential elections ===
Candidate	Party	Votes	%
Denis Sassou Nguesso	Congolese Party of Labour	838,922	60.19
Guy Brice Parfait Kolélas	Congolese Movement for Democracy and Integral Development	209,632	15.04
Jean-Marie Mokoko	Independent	191,562	13.74
Pascal Tsaty Mabiala	Pan-African Union for Social Democracy	65,025	4.67
André Okombi Salissa	Initiative for Democracy in Congo	57,373	4.12
Claudine Munari	Movement for Unity, Solidarity and Labour	21,530	1.54
Joseph Kignoumbi Kia Mboungou	Chain	3,540	0.25
Michel Mboussi Ngouari	Convention of Republican Parties	3,301	0.24
Anguios Nganguia Engabé	Party for Action of the Republic	2,905	0.21
Total		1,393,790	100.00
Valid votes		1,393,790	93.55
Invalid/blank votes		96,171	6.45
Total votes		1,489,961	100.00
Registered voters/turnout		2,161,839	68.92
Source: Constitutional Court

=== Parliamentary elections ===
Party	First round			Second round			Seats		
Party	Votes	%	Seats	Votes	%	Seats	Extended mandate (Note: The elections were not held in the Pool Department (9 seats). Instead, the term of the nine outgoing deputies was extended: Of these, five belonged to the Congolese Party of Labour and four to the Congolese Movement for Democracy and Integral Development.)	Total	+/−
Congolese Party of Labour			72			19	5	96	+7
Pan-African Union for Social Democracy			3			5	0	8	+1
Congolese Movement for Democracy and Integral Development			0			0	4	4	−3
Action and Renewal Movement			3			1	0	4	0
Rally for Democracy and Social Progress			2			1	0	3	−2
Dynamic for the Republic and Recovery			0			3	0	3	New
Union for a People's Movement			2			0	0	2	+2
Citizen Rally			1			0	0	1	−2
Republican and Liberal Party			0			1	0	1	0
Club 2002 – Party for the Unity and the Republic			1			0	0	1	0
Union of Democratic Forces			1			0	0	1	0
Party for Agreement and Political Action			1			0	0	1	+1
Patriotic Front			1			0	0	1	+1
Movement for Democracy and Progress			0			1	0	1	+1
Party for Unity, Liberty and Progress			0			1	0	1	+1
Congress for Democracy and the Republic			0			1	0	1	New
Republican Convention for Democracy and Progress			0			1	0	1	New
La Chaîne			0			1	0	1	New
National Movement for the Liberation of Congo			0			1	0	1	New
Independents			8			11	0	19	+7
Total			95			47	9	151	+12
Registered voters/turnout	2,221,596	–							
Source: Jeune Afrique, IPU

== International organization participation ==
ACCT, ACP, AfDB, BDEAC, CCC, CEEAC, ECA, FAO, FZ, G-77, IBRD, ICAO, ICFTU, ICRM, IDA, IFAD, IFC, IFRCS, ILO, IMF, IMO, Intelsat, Interpol, IOC, IOM (observer), ITU, NAM, OAU, OPCW, UDEAC, UN (Security Council member for 2006/2007), UNCTAD, UNESCO, UNIDO, UPU, WFTU, WHO, WIPO, WMO, WToO, WTrO
