= 2017 Republic of the Congo Senate election =

- 31 August 2017
- 72 seats in the Senate
Party	Leader	Seats
PCT	Denis Sassou Nguesso	44
UPADS	Pascal Tsaty Mabiala	2
MAR	Roland Bouiti-Viaudo	2
RDPS	Jean-Marc Thystère-Tchicaya	2
Club 2002	Wilfrid Nguesso	1
PULP		1
PRL	Nicéphore Fylla de Saint-Eudes	1
FP	Destinée Doukaga	1
Independents	–	12
This lists parties that won seats. See the complete results below.
President of the Senate before	President of the Senate after
André Obami Itou	Pierre Ngolo

Senate elections were held in the Republic of the Congo on 31 August 2017. The Senate was renewed in its entirety for the first time as the result of constitutional reform enacted two years earlier. Previously Senate elections had seen half the members elected.

The Congolese Party of Labour (on the political left) kept the vast majority of seats at 44 out of 72. Twelve other seats went to close independents, with the rest to allies. The opposition only got two seats.

== Background ==
The elections had taken place one month after the legislative elections, which had seen the victory of the Congolese Party of Labour of president Denis Sassou Nguesso, which retained the majority of seats. As with that election, the senate election had taken place while the Pool Department had been shaken by battles between the forces of order and the militants of Frédéric Bintsamou, also known as Pastor Ntumi, which caused the displacement of millions of people. Thus, the vote only took place in eleven of the twelve departments of the Republic of the Congo.

== Electoral system ==
The Senate is composed of 72 senators elected for a six-year term using first-past-the-post voting in an indirect election. Six senators are elected for each of the 12 departments.

The senators are elected by an electoral college composed of departmental and municipal counselors, for about 1,100 electors. Starting from the constitutional revision validated in a 2015 referendum, the Senate is completely renewed in each election. Before that, it had been renewed by half every three years, with the six-year terms staggered on the appropriate half-term.

The senate was initially composed of 66 senators, before switching to 72 during the 2008 elections because of the creation of the Pointe-Noire Department.

== Results ==
The Congolese Party of Labour (PCT) took the majority of seats with 44 seats, even though it only took 24 seats in the previous senate. All departments in the center and north were considered electoral strongholds for President Nguesso. Twelve other seats went to independents and to eight other parties close to the PCT, such as PULP, RDPS, Club 2002, and the PRL. The Pan-African Union for Social Democracy, the principal opposition party, only obtained two seats, down from four before.

The vote could not happen in the Pool Department. So, the terms for the six senators from that department were extended by the Constitutional Court until there are partial elections, whose date remains to be determined.

Party	Seats
Congolese Party of Labour	44
Pan-African Union for Social Democracy	2
Action and Renewal Movement	2
Rally for Democracy and Social Progress	2
Club 2002 – Party for the Unity and the Republic	1
Party for Unity, Liberty and Progress	1
Liberal Republican Party	1
Patriotic Front	1
Independents	12
Extended Pool Department senators	6
Total	72
Source: ADIAC

Among those elected to power was Pierre Ngolo, age 63, the secretary general since 2011.
