= 2022 Republic of the Congo parliamentary election =

- 10 July 2022 (first round); 31 July 2022 (second round)
- All 151 seats in the National Assembly; 76 seats needed for a majority
Party	Leader	Seats	+/–
PCT	Denis Sassou Nguesso	112	+16
UPADS	Pascal Tsaty Mabiala	7	−1
UDH-YUKI	Pascal Ngouanou	7	New
MAR	Roland Bouiti-Viaudo	4	0
PRL	Nicéphore Fylla de Saint-Eudes	2	+1
Club 2002	Juste Désiré Mondélé	2	+1
DRD	Hellot Matson Mampouya	2	−1
RDPS	Jean-Pierre Thystère Tchicaya	2	−1
APC	Rodrigue Malanda-Samba	1	+1
MUST	Claudine Munari	1	+1
MDP	Jean-Claude Ibovi	1	New
CPR	Aimé Hydvert Mouagni	1	+1
URDP	Luc Adamo Mateta	1	New
RC	Claude Alphonse Nsilou	1	0
MCDDI	Vacant	1	−3
Independents	—	6	−13
This lists parties that won seats. See the complete results below.
President of the National Assembly before	President of the National Assembly after
Isidore Mvouba; PCT	Isidore Mvouba; PCT

Parliamentary elections were held in the Republic of the Congo in July 2022, with the first round completed on 10 July. A second round was scheduled for 31 July in constituencies where no candidates were elected in the first round.

== Electoral system ==
Members of the National Assembly are elected in single-member constituencies using the two-round system; if no candidate receives a majority of the votes in the first round, a run-off is held.

== Results ==
=== First round ===
It was reported that the ruling Congolese Party of Labour had won 102 of the 142 elected seats in the first round, enough for a supermajority on its own. They also had 14 candidates move on to a run-off. The Pan-African Union for Social Democracy won four seats in the first round, with four candidates moving on to a run-off. The Union of Humanist Democrats won three seats in the first round, with seven candidates moving on to a run-off.

=== Second round ===
On 3 August, provisional results published by the Minister of Territorial Administration stated the Congolese Party of Labour had won a total of 111 seats between the two rounds. The Union of Humanist Democrats won four additional seats in their run-offs, bringing their total to seven, while the Pan-African Union for Social Democracy won three of their run-offs, also resulting in a total of seven seats. Turnout in both rounds was reported to be low, although no figure was published by election authorities.

=== Summary ===
Party	Seats	+/–
Congolese Party of Labour	112	+16
Pan-African Union for Social Democracy	7	−1
Union of Humanist Democrats-Yuki	7	New
Action and Renewal Movement	4	0
Republican and Liberal Party	2	+1
Club 2002 – Party for the Unity and the Republic	2	+1
Dynamic for the Republic and Recovery	2	−1
Rally for Democracy and Social Progress	2	−1
Permanent Action for the Congo	1	+1
Movement for Unity, Solidarity and Labour	1	+1
Movement for Democracy and Progress	1	New
Perspectives and Realities Club	1	+1
Union for the Reconstruction and Development	1	New
Citizen Rally	1	0
Movement for Democracy and Integral Development	1	−3
Independents	6	−13
Total	151	0
Source: Africa Elects
