= Jean-Michel Bokamba-Yangouma =

Republic of the Congo politician (died 2020)

Jean-Michel Bokamba-Yangouma (died 23 June 2020) was a Congolese politician. He was a prominent political figure from the 1970s to the 1990s, heading the Congolese Trade Union Confederation (Confédération syndicale congolaise, CSC). He was the President of the General Movement for the Construction of Congo (Mouvement général pour la construction du Congo, MGCC), a political party.

== Political career ==
Bokamba-Yangouma was from Cuvette Region in northern Congo-Brazzaville. He was the Secretary-General of the CSC from 1974 to 1997. During the single party rule of the Congolese Labour Party (PCT), he also became a member of the PCT Political Bureau in 1979 and was assigned responsibility for party organization. In addition, he was Secretary of the Central Committee in charge of the coordination of the party and the activities of mass organizations from 1984 to 1990. In 1989, he was assigned responsibility for the coordination of the activities of mass organizations in the Political Bureau; for Bokamba-Yangouma, who had been the regime's third-ranking figure, the occasion marked a decline in influence, which was related to the CSC's active opposition to applications of the Structural Arrangement Programme. He remained on the Political Bureau until 1991.

Seeking greater political reform and the establishment of multi party politics, the CSC unsuccessfully sought its independence from the PCT in 1990. It led a general strike and protests in September–October 1990, causing the PCT regime to allow the creation of other political parties. Bokamba-Yangouma joined the opposition shortly before the February–June 1991 National Conference, playing a key role in ending the PCT regime. He was the First Vice-President of the Higher Council of the Republic during the 1991–92 transitional period leading to multi party elections. Following the 1992 local elections, which were organized by the government of Prime Minister André Milongo and were widely criticized, Bokamba-Yangouma successfully worked to have Milongo's government deprived of its responsibility for organizing the subsequent parliamentary and presidential elections. Leading a political party, the Union for Democracy and Social Progress (UDPS), he was then elected to the National Assembly and became the First Vice-President of the National Assembly. Bokamba-Yangouma, who was allied with President Pascal Lissouba, served as President of the Economic and Social Council until Lissouba was ousted at the end of the June–October 1997 civil war. Bokamba-Yangouma fled into exile at the end of the war.

According to Bokamba-Yangouma, he turned to religion during his exile and became a devout Christian. He became the First Vice-President of the Patriotic Front for Dialogue and National Reconciliation (FPDRN), an opposition movement in exile, and in April 2001, he returned to Congo-Brazzaville to participate in a national dialogue as part of the FPDRN delegation. He subsequently returned on a permanent basis and met with President Denis Sassou Nguesso. In December 2001, while still President of the UDPS, he became the head of an opposition coalition composed of 44 parties and associations.

Bokamba-Yangouma later dissolved the UDPS and founded the General Movement of Christians of Congo (Mouvement général des chrétiens du Congo, MGCC), a religiously-oriented party, in May 2004. As President of the MGCC, Bokamba-Yangouma said that the party would be inclusive and that non-Christians could join, "provided that they share the ideals of our party". Due to a constitutional prohibition on religious political parties, the MGCC was subsequently renamed as the General Movement for the Construction of Congo (Mouvement général pour la construction du Congo), retaining its acronym.

The MGCC held its first ordinary congress on 31 March 2007, stressing the importance of love and unity in the development of "a new and prosperous Congo". Bokamba-Yangouma called for the 2007 parliamentary election to be delayed due to the existence of what he described as a "legal vacuum"; this was a reference to the fact that a bill providing for the creation of an independent electoral commission had been approved by the National Assembly but not signed into law by Sassou Nguesso in time for the election. Like many other opposition parties, the MGCC boycotted the election. By early 2008, the MGCC identified itself as a centrist party and distanced itself from the opposition. Together with another party, the Union for the Reconstruction and Development of Congo (URDC), the MGCC formed a coalition, the Coalition of Center Parties (CPC), in April 2008. Bokamba-Yangouma was designated as the first President of the Coalition.

Bokamba-Yangouma supported Sassou Nguesso's bid for another term in the July 2009 presidential election. He was included on the 91-member National Coordination of the National Initiative for Peace (INP), a political association promoting Sassou Nguesso's 2009 re-election in conjunction with the preservation of peace, which was launched on 28 February 2009.

On 12 April 2012, Bokamba-Yangouma, who was serving as Vice-President of the CPC coalition at the time, was suspended from the coalition on the grounds that he had not respected its rules. He stood as an MGCC candidate in Mossaka in the July–August 2012 parliamentary election, but he did not win a seat. As national coordinator for the grouping of "center" parties, he said in January 2016 that his grouping would support President Sassou Nguesso in the March 2016 presidential election.

== Death ==
Jean Michel Bokamba-Yangouma died in the evening of 23 June 2020 in Brazzaville from the effects of COVID-19 during the COVID-19 pandemic in the Republic of the Congo. He was buried the next morning, in accordance with health protocol, in the cemetery of downtown Brazzaville.
