= FCBM =

FCBM may refer to:

- First Capital Bank Mozambique, a commercial bank that is licensed by the Bank of Mozambique
- Mouyondzi Airport (ICAO: FCBM), a defunct airport in the Republic of the Congo
- FC Bayern Munich, a football club in Germany whose initials are sometimes abbreviated to FCBM (to distinguish it from another football club with 'FCB' initials, FC Barcelona)
