= Jean-Didace Médard Moussodia =

Republic of the Congo politician

Jean-Didace Médard Moussodia is a Congolese politician who has served as a Deputy in the National Assembly of Congo-Brazzaville since 2002.

== Political career ==
In the May–June 2002 parliamentary election, Moussodia stood as the candidate of the Union for Democracy and the Republic (UDR–Mwinda), an opposition party, in the third constituency of Moungali, located in Brazzaville. He won the seat in the second round of voting. Moussodia was one of six UDR–Mwinda deputies elected to the National Assembly in 2002. When the National Assembly began meeting in August 2002, UDR–Mwinda leader André Milongo presided over the initial meeting due to his status as the oldest deputy (doyen d'âge). He was assisted in that role by the two youngest deputies, one of whom was Moussodia.

Subsequently Moussodia left the UDR–Mwinda and joined the Division of Young Republicans (PJR), a group led by Denis-Christel Sassou Nguesso, the son of President Denis Sassou Nguesso. In the June–August 2007 parliamentary election, he stood for re-election to the National Assembly as an independent candidate in the same constituency, and he prevailed in the first round with 51.19% of the vote. He had to stand as an independent because the PJR, as a political association rather than a party, could not directly field candidates for election. Eight PJR members, including Moussodia, were elected to the National Assembly as independent candidates in the 2007 election. At a PJR meeting on 12 October 2007, Moussodia was designated as the PJR's Secretary for Relations with Affiliated Associations and Political Partners.

On 8 October 2011, Moussodia donated 33 sewing machines for girls in his constituency.

In the July–August 2012 parliamentary election, Moussodia was again re-elected to the National Assembly as an independent candidate in the third constituency of Moungali; he won the seat in the first round with 57.49% of the vote.

On 12 September 2013, Moussodia was re-elected as President of the Party for Unity, Freedom and Progress (PULP–Moko Molé), a political party that supported President Sassou Nguesso, at a party meeting in Brazzaville.

At a meeting with his constituents on 4 January 2014, Moussodia gave out envelopes containing 25,000 CFA francs each to 800 women in order to help them start small businesses. He also discussed the work of the National Assembly and listened to the problems facing his constituents.

In the July 2017 parliamentary election, Moussodia stood for re-election as the PULP candidate in the third constituency of Moungali. He placed first in the first round of voting with 38.34%, slightly ahead of second place candidate Gervine Mounea Aya. He won the seat in the second round of voting. He was designated as First Vice-President of the Planning Commission of the National Assembly on 2 September 2017.
