= Mateta =

Mateta or Matéta may refer to:

- Jean-Philippe Mateta (born 1997), French footballer
- Luc Adamo Matéta (born 1949), Congolese politician
- Verckys Kiamuangana Mateta (1944–2022), Congolese musician
- Mateta F.C., a football club in Zimbabwe Division 1
