= Jeanne Dambendzet =

Congolese politician

Jeanne Dambendzet (born 1 August 1943) is a Congolese politician. She served in the government of Congo-Brazzaville from 1989 to 1991 and again from 1997 to 2009. Since 2009 she has been the First Vice-President of the Economic and Social Council, a state institution. She is a member of the Congolese Labour Party (PCT) and has been National Executive Secretary of the Women's Organization of Congo, the PCT's women's organization, since 2013.

== Background and early political career ==
Dambendzet was born in Franceville, located in southeastern Gabon. She is related to President Denis Sassou Nguesso (he is her mother's first cousin) and the two have known each other since they were children. She became a teacher and was an activist within the teachers' union; she was also a founder of the Revolutionary Union of Congolese Women (URFC). From 1977 to 1980, she was a URFC delegate to the Women's International Democratic Federation; subsequently, she was the Women's International Democratic Federation's Permanent Representative to UNESCO from 1980 to 1984.

At the PCT's Third Ordinary Congress, held on 27–31 July 1984, Dambendzet was elected to the 75-member PCT Central Committee. She was also assigned to head the studies and research division of the PCT. On 13 August 1989, she was appointed to the Congolese government as Minister of Labour and Social Security, holding that post until the PCT regime ended in 1991.

== Political career since the early 1990s ==
Dambendzet remained loyal to Sassou Nguesso during the presidency of Pascal Lissouba (1992–1997) and worked actively on his behalf during the June–October 1997 civil war. After the victory of Sassou Nguesso's forces, Dambendzet was again appointed to the government as Minister of the Civil Service and Administrative Reform on 2 November 1997; her portfolio was expanded to include the advancement of women on 12 January 1999. In the May 2002 parliamentary election, Dambendzet was elected to the National Assembly as the PCT candidate in Ngoko constituency, located in Cuvette Region; she received 55.43% of the vote and won the seat in the first round. Following the election, she was moved to the post of Minister of Agriculture, Animal Husbandry, Fisheries, and the Advancement of Women on 18 August 2002; she remained in that position in the government named on 7 January 2005, although her portfolio was reduced to agriculture, animal husbandry, and fisheries. Her portfolio was further reduced to agriculture and animal husbandry on 3 March 2007.

In the 2007 parliamentary election, Dambendzet was again elected to the National Assembly as the PCT candidate in Ngoko; she won the seat in the first round with 67.58% of the vote. She was subsequently moved to the post of Minister of Trade, Consumption, and Supplies on 30 December 2007.

Dambendzet distributed tables to traders and vendors at the Bourreau market in Brazzaville on 22 August 2009. She explained that one of her ministry's tasks was the modernization of markets and that the selling of goods off the ground was a public health problem. According to Dambendzet, more tables would be distributed at other markets to help the markets meet basic standards of public health.

Dambendzet was dismissed from the government on 15 September 2009 and was then appointed by Sassou Nguesso as First Vice-President of the Economic and Social Council on 18 September 2009. She met with Claudine Munari, her successor as Minister of Trade, on 24 September to discuss issues facing the ministry, especially Economic Partnership Agreements with the European Union. She also discussed internal trade issues, such as rising food prices. Munari said that she would continue to consult with Dambendzet when needed.

As First Vice-President of the Economic and Social Council, Dambendzet met with Florent Ntsiba, the Minister of Labour and Social Security, on 13 November 2009 to discuss greater cooperation between the Council and the government on policies, including those related to employment, training, wages, and pensions. She said that the Council would communicate the concerns and desires of the people to relevant ministries.

At the PCT's Sixth Extraordinary Congress, held in July 2011, Dambendzet was elected to the PCT's 51-member Political Bureau.

In August 2013, at the constitutive congress of the Women's Organization of Congo (OFC), the PCT's newly created women's organization, Dambendzet was designated as the OFC's National Executive Secretary.

During the campaign for the September 2014 local elections, Dambendzet was dispatched to Cuvette Department to campaign for the PCT's candidates there.

As a writer and editor, she collaborated with Scholastique Dianzinga on the volume La place et le rôle des femmes dans la société congolaise, 1960-2010, which also included contributions from Thereze Gamassa and others.
