= Lydie Pongault =

Congolese politician (born 1959)

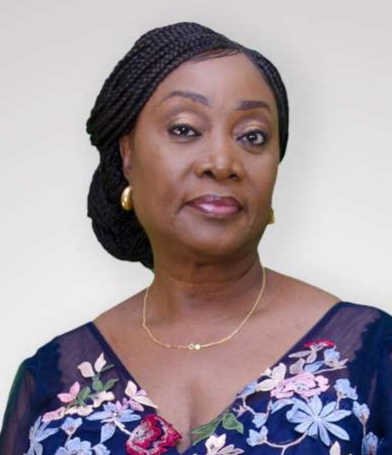

Minister of Cultural Industry, Tourism, Arts and Leisure of the Republic of Congo
- Incumbent
- Assumed office 27 September 2022
- President: Denis Sassou-Nguesso
- Prime Minister: Anatole Collinet Makosso

Personal details
- Born: Marie-France Lydie Helene Pongault; 1959 (age 66–67)

Lydie Pongault (born 1959) is a Congolese museum director, financier and politician, who was appointed Minister of Cultural Industry, Tourism, Arts and Leisure of the Republic of Congo on 24 September 2022.

== Biography ==
Born Marie-France Lydie Hélène Pongault in 1959, she studied for diplomas in accounting, management and private law, and subsequently held positions in finance for several years within several Congolese companies, before changing career to focus on culture and the arts.

One of her first roles as financial director was at Les Dépêches de Brazzaville. She was also a financial director for GKM Audit & Conseil. She also held the position of director of the Musée Galerie du Bassin du Congo and the Les manguiers bookstore. As museum director, Pongault worked to extend the international reputation of the institution and its collection. During her tenure she curated several exhibitions, including one on the Kébé-Kébé dance. In 2013, she was appointed as an advisor to the Head of the Department of Culture, Arts and Tourism within the Congolese presidency.

On 24 September 2022, following a cabinet reshuffle, Pongault joined the second Makosso government as Minister of Cultural Industry, Tourism, Arts and Leisure, replacing Dieudonné Moyongo [fr] and Destinée Doukaga, who had held the respective positions of Minister of Culture and Arts and Minister of Tourism and Leisure in the first Makosso government. As minister she has reiterated the importance of Congolese investment in the arts and tourism for the government.
