= Clément Mouamba =

Congolese politician (1943–2021)

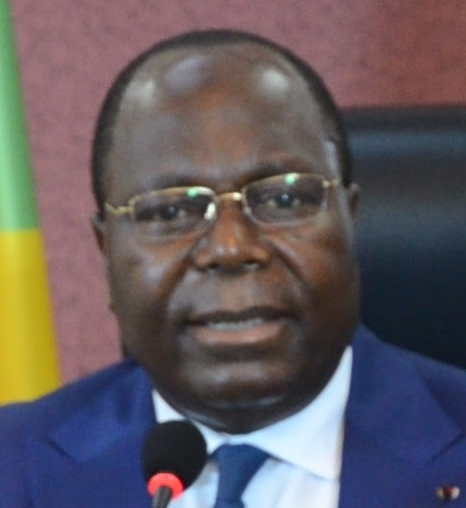
- Mouamba in 2017

Prime Minister of the Republic of the Congo
- In office 23 April 2016 – 12 May 2021
- President: Denis Sassou Nguesso
- Preceded by: Isidore Mvouba
- Succeeded by: Anatole Collinet Makosso

Personal details
- Born: 13 November 1943 Sibiti, French Equatorial Africa
- Died: 29 October 2021 (aged 77) Paris, France
- Party: Pan-African Union for Social Democracy (until 2016); Congolese Party of Labour (2016–2021)

Clément Mouamba (13 November 1943 – 29 October 2021) was a Congolese politician who was Prime Minister of the Republic of the Congo from 2016 until 2021.

He previously served as Minister of Finance from 1992 to 1993.

== Political career ==
Mouamba was born on 13 November 1943, in Sibiti. Under President Pascal Lissouba, he was Minister of Finance from September 1992 to June 1993. Mouamba was a leading member of the Pan-African Union for Social Democracy (UPADS), which was the ruling party under Lissouba and went into opposition after Lissouba's ouster in the 1997 civil war.

Mouamba was one of several top officials who served under Lissouba to face corruption charges in connection with the misappropriation of funds from selling oil, far below market value, to Occidental Petroleum in 1993. However, on 27 December 2001 the charges against Mouamba and Claudine Munari were dismissed on the grounds that they were just following orders. Lissouba and four other top officials—who were tried in absentia, as they had fled the country when Lissouba was ousted—were convicted and sentenced to decades of hard labour.

At the first extraordinary congress of UPADS, held on 27–28 December 2006, Mouamba was elected as one of the party's 25 vice-presidents.

Mouamba broke with his party in the period preceding the 2015 constitutional referendum, choosing to take part in a government-sponsored dialogue, which the opposition boycotted, on the question of changing the constitution. The referendum, which UPADS opposed, allowed President Denis Sassou Nguesso to run for another term in the March 2016 presidential election. After Sassou Nguesso was sworn in for another term on 16 April 2016, he appointed Mouamba as Prime Minister on 23 April.

Mouamba was designated as the candidate of the ruling Congolese Labour Party (PCT) in the town of Sibiti for the July 2017 parliamentary election, taking the place of Thierry Moungalla, the Minister of Communications. Mouamba ran unopposed, with no other candidates standing in the constituency. Following the election, in which the PCT won a parliamentary majority, Mouamba submitted the pro forma resignation of his government on 16 August. As the oldest member (doyen d'âge) of the newly elected National Assembly, he presided over the election of the Bureau of the National Assembly on 19 August 2017. Sassou Nguesso reappointed him as Prime Minister on 21 August. The composition of Mouamba's new government was announced on 22 August; it was slightly smaller than his previous government (35 members compared to 38), but the changes in the composition of the government were considered relatively minor.

In May 2021, Mouamba and his government resigned. He was succeeded by Anatole Collinet Makosso as Prime Minister.

== Death ==
Clément Mouamba died on 29 October 2021, in Paris from COVID-19.

Political offices
| Vacant Title last held by Isidore Mvouba | Prime Minister of the Republic of the Congo; 2016–2021 | Succeeded by Anatole Collinet Makosso |
