= Party of the Poor =

Party of the Poor may refer to:

- Party of the Poor (Republic of the Congo)
- Party of the Poor (Mexico)
