= Politics of the Congo =

Politics of the Congo may refer to:

- Politics of the Democratic Republic of the Congo
- Politics of the Republic of the Congo
