= Movement for Unity, Solidarity and Labour =

Movement for Unity, Solidarity and Labour Mouvement pour l'unité, la solidarité et le travail
- Abbreviation: MUST
- President: Claudine Munari
- Founded: 2009
- Colors: Red
- National Assembly: 1 / 151

The Movement for Unity, Solidarity and Labour (French: Mouvement pour l'unité, la solidarité et le travail, abbreviated MUST, is an opposition political party in the Republic of the Congo, created in 2009 and chaired by Claudine Munari, former Minister of Trade (2009-2015) and candidate in the 2016 Republic of the Congo presidential election.

== History ==
Founded in 2009, MUST participated in the 2012 parliamentary election, and it was under its banner that its president and founder, Claudine Munari, was re-elected in the constituency of Mouyondzi.

On 30 January 2015, the political bureau of MUST spoke out against the proposed constitutional changes of President Denis Sassou Nguesso, which it considers unfounded and inopportune on the eve of a presidential election: "You don't change the rules of the game before the end of the match. Doing so would amount to a constitutional coup that would undermine peace, security and institutional stability".

During the 2016 presidential election, Claudine Munari ran as a candidate under the MUST banner. The only female presidential candidate, she aimed to be "the president of unity and the fight against youth unemployment", and her objective was to "radically change Congo". She received 1.54% of the vote, finishing 7th out of nine candidates, and contested the re-election of Denis Sassou-Nguesso.

During the 2017 parliamentary election, the Frocad-IDC opposition alliance, of which MUST is a part, called for a boycott of the elections to protest the crisis in the Pool Department. Claudine Munari therefore did not run for re-election in Mouyondzi and lost her seat. In June 2018, the party was penalised by a 2017 law prohibiting political formations that do not have elected representatives.

During the 2022 parliamentary election, MUST recovered a single seat in the National Assembly with the victory of its founding president in Mouyondzi.

== See also ==
- List of political parties in the Republic of the Congo
