= Simon Gokana =

Simon Gokana was a Congolese politician. He was a nurse by profession. Gokana served as Minister of Public Health and Population between April 1965 and August 1968.
