= Jean-Claude Ibovi =

Republic of the Congo politician

Jean-Claude Ibovi is a Congolese politician who has served as a Deputy in the National Assembly of Congo-Brazzaville since 2007. He is President of the Movement for Democracy and Progress (MDP), a small pro-government party.

== Political career ==
Ibovi is a brother of François Ibovi, who was a prominent minister in the government of President Denis Sassou Nguesso. He campaigned vigorously for Sassou Nguesso in the March 2002 presidential election. In the May–June 2002 parliamentary election, Ibovi stood as the candidate of the National Convention for the Defense and Promotion of Denis Sassou Nguesso's Ideas (CNDPID) in the second constituency of Talangaï, a district of Brazzaville. He faced Théophile Adoua, the candidate of the Congolese Labour Party (PCT). However, on 28 May 2002—two days after the first round of voting—Ibovi was disqualified by the electoral commission. He was accused of orchestrating an assault on the head of the local election commission, tampering with ballot boxes, and continuing to campaign after the official end of the campaigning period. The government reportedly viewed Ibovi as being too combative and favored candidates who appeared "more respectable". Ibovi said that partial results from the first round showed him winning about 52% of the vote. He argued that the electoral commission did not have the authority to disqualify him and said that he would pursue legal action. Ibovi subsequently became Mayor of Ouenzé, another Brazzaville district.

Later, the CNDPID was transformed into a new political party under Ibovi's leadership, the Movement for Democracy and Progress (MDP), which was officially launched on 18 February 2007. In the June–August 2007 parliamentary election, Ibovi stood as the MDP candidate in the second constituency of Talangaï. In the first round, he placed first with 46.14% of the vote, ahead of the PCT candidate Théophile Adoua, who received 42.8%. Ibovi and Adoua, both pro-government candidates, therefore faced one another in a second round of voting. Ibovi won the seat in the second round with 58.50% of the vote; he was the only MDP candidate to obtain a seat in the National Assembly. After the National Assembly began meeting for its new term, Ibovi was designated as First Vice-President of the National Assembly's Foreign Affairs and Cooperation Commission on 18 September 2007.

At a constituent meeting on 5 February 2011, Ibovi discussed the state budget for 2011, explaining the amount of funds provided to key ministries for investment in national development. He praised President Sassou Nguesso's leadership and his development program and urged people to support the President. On 5 May 2011, Ibovi called on all the various political parties supporting Sassou Nguesso to unite into a single party. Unlike a number of other small parties, however, the MDP did not merge into Sassou Nguesso's party, the Congolese Labour Party (PCT), in 2011. Ibovi argued that, while he supported Sassou Nguesso, it was necessary to make a distinction between the President and his political party.

Ibovi's constituency in Talangaï was affected by a massive explosion at a munitions dump in March 2012, in which hundreds of people were killed. In the July–August 2012 parliamentary election, voting was not held in his constituency, as well as two others that were affected, due to the disaster; Ibovi and the two other deputies had their terms extended by the Constitutional Court in a ruling on 17 August 2012. The ruling was in line with a constitutional provision allowing for such extensions when voting could not be properly held due to "exceptionally serious circumstances".

On 1 September 2012, Ibovi visited constituents in the Kanga-Mbanzi section of Talangaï, which was badly affected by the blast. Many people were left homeless and reduced to sleeping in tents; angry and feeling neglected by the government, some threatened to take shelter in public buildings during the rainy season, when their tents would not be sufficient. Ibovi assured the people that the government understood their plight and would help them, and he asked that they not occupy public buildings. He apparently succeeded in calming the situation.

After the National Assembly began meeting for its new term, Ibovi was again designated as First Vice-President of the National Assembly's Foreign Affairs and Cooperation Commission on 19 September 2012.

From 11 May 2013 to 12 August 2013, Ibovi stayed in Paris for medical treatment. He held constituent meetings on 26 September and 28 September 2013, where he credited God and the prayers of his constituents for his return. He vowed that the 2014 budget must include relief for people affected by the explosion, and he called for calm and patience. On 30 December 2013, Ibovi, along with the Future Generation foundation, distributed food to widowed residents of Talangaï for New Year's celebrations.

Speaking at an MDP party meeting on 2 March 2014, Ibovi argued that it was necessary to diversify the economy beyond its reliance on oil. He also blamed government ministers for "paralyzing inertia" that interfered with the implementation of Sassou Nguesso's plans for economic development. At a constituency meeting on 14 June 2014, he discussed the National Assembly's recent work and listened to complaints about local problems. He stressed his dedication to helping young people get training and employment, saying that he was responsible for the training of a thousand local youths over the course of five years. He also stressed that he used his own pay to help young people.

Standing as an MDP candidate, Ibovi was elected as a local councillor in Talangaï in the September 2014 local elections. He subsequently relinquished that seat, and the MDP selected Roland Valere Okouelet-Dongaud to take his place on 28 October 2014.

In the July 2017 parliamentary election, Ibovi stood for re-election in the second constituency of Talangaï. In his re-election campaign he cited his accomplishments in providing job training for young people and vowed to make job training available to 600 more young people. He was re-elected in the first round of voting, receiving 56% of the vote. He was again designated as First Vice-President of the Foreign Affairs Commission of the National Assembly on 2 September 2017.
