= Angèle Bandou =

Congolese politician (died 2004)

- Known for: Founder and President of the Party of the Poor

Angèle Bandou (died August 26, 2004) was a politician in the Republic of the Congo. She was the founder and President of the Party of the Poor. She was the only female candidate to contest the 1992 Congolese presidential election, and the subsequent election in 2002 where she placed third. Bandou was the first woman to ever stand for presidency in the Republic of the Congo. She was murdered by intruders in her house in 2004.

== Political career ==
She founded the Party of the Poor in 1991. Bandou was a nun, who said that entering politics was a calling from God, explaining that "God asked me to form a party and told me it would be a second revolution in our country." At the time of the message, there was no democratic process under the Marxist government. She ran in the 1992 presidential election on behalf of the party where she received less than one percent overall of the vote. Bandou said in response to the low number of votes received, "In the eyes of humans, I had failed. But spiritually, I had brought a message." In standing in 1992, she became the first women to stand for president in the country.

She sought to stand again in the abandoned 1997 election, but instead stood in the 2002 presidential election as one of the ten candidates. She received 27,849 votes (2.32 percent) to finish in third place behind Joseph Kignoumbi Kia Mboungou for the Pan-African Union for Social Democracy (33,154 votes, 2.76 percent) and eventual President Denis Sassou Nguesso for the Congolese Party of Labour (1,075,247 votes, 89.41 percent).

In an interview in 1997, she explained that her view on politics was based on working with the youth of the country and Africa in general, as well as improving education. Bandou felt that more women should participate in politics, saying that tradition dictates the roles of men and women in society, as well as adding "the way politics is conducted in Africa also scares women off... youths are given weapons, people kill one another... I must admit that if God had not given me this mission, I would not have dared to run."

== Death ==
On 26 August 2004, Angèle Bandou was assassinated by unknown assailants in her home. Rumours were spread that the murder was carried out on orders of President Nguesso.
