= Pierre Passi =

Congolese politician

Pierre Passi is a Congolese politician and diplomat. He was Congo-Brazzaville's Ambassador to China from 1999 to 2007, and he was a Deputy in the National Assembly of Congo-Brazzaville from 2007 to 2012. He has been Vice-President of the Constitutional Court of Congo-Brazzaville since 2012.

== Diplomatic and political career ==
When Denis Sassou Nguesso returned to power at the conclusion of the June–October 1997 civil war, he appointed Passi, a northerner, as Minister of Fish and Fishery Resources on 2 November 1997.

Subsequently, Passi was appointed as Ambassador to China; he arrived in Beijing on 15 July 1999 and presented his credentials to Chinese President Jiang Zemin on 21 July 1999. He was additionally accredited as Ambassador to North Korea, presenting his credentials to de facto head of state Kim Yong Nam in Pyongyang on 16 December 1999, as Ambassador to Vietnam, and as Ambassador to Thailand; he presented his credentials to the King of Thailand on 16 November 2000. He was accredited as Ambassador to Cambodia as well. Later, Passi was also assigned responsibility for relations with India, presenting his credentials to Indian President A. P. J. Abdul Kalam on 20 January 2003.

When President Sassou Nguesso was elected as Chairman of the African Union, Passi said in March 2006 that Sassou Nguesso would ensure the continuation of good relations and cooperation between Africa and China. He noted that Congo-Brazzaville in particular had a long and warm relationship with China and that trade and economic cooperation between the two countries was strong. In addition, Passi stressed Congo-Brazzaville's support for the one-China policy.

In the June 2007 parliamentary election, Passi stood as the candidate of the Congolese Labor Party (PCT) in the Mayéyé constituency of Lékoumou Department. He placed first in the first round, receiving 36.47% of the vote against 26.54% for Simon Mfoutou. Because no candidate received a majority in the first round, a second round was held in August 2007, but Passi faced no opposition on that occasion and won the seat with 100% of the vote.

After the National Assembly began meeting for its new parliamentary term, Passi was designated as President of the National Assembly's Foreign Affairs and Cooperation Commission on 18 September 2007. He left his diplomatic post in China to sit in the National Assembly.

In 2011, Passi was included on the five-member Preparatory Committee for the PCT's Sixth Extraordinary Congress as Second Rapporteur. At the Sixth Extraordinary Congress, held in July 2011, Passi was elected to the PCT's 51-member Political Bureau.

Passi was not re-elected to his seat in the National Assembly in the July–August 2012 parliamentary election. Simon Mfoutou, who had been defeated by Passi in the 2007 election, won the seat for Mayéyé as the candidate of the opposition Pan-African Union for Social Democracy (UPADS). Passi was subsequently appointed as Vice-President of the Constitutional Court on 17 September 2012; he was sworn in a month later, on 18 October.

== See also ==
- China–Republic of the Congo relations
- Foreign relations of the Republic of the Congo
