= Jean Félix Demba Telo =

Jean Félix Demba Telo is a Congolese politician who stood in the March 2002 presidential election as an independent candidate. He gained 20,252 votes.
