= Augustin Poignet =

Congolese politician

Augustin Poignet was the politician from Republic of the Congo who served as President of Senate of the Republic of the Congo.

== Personal life ==
He was born on 28 April 1928 and died on 26 June 2008 in Paris. He also served as interim president of Congo in 1968 for one day and became Minister of Defense after that.
