= Isidore Mvouba =

Congolese politician

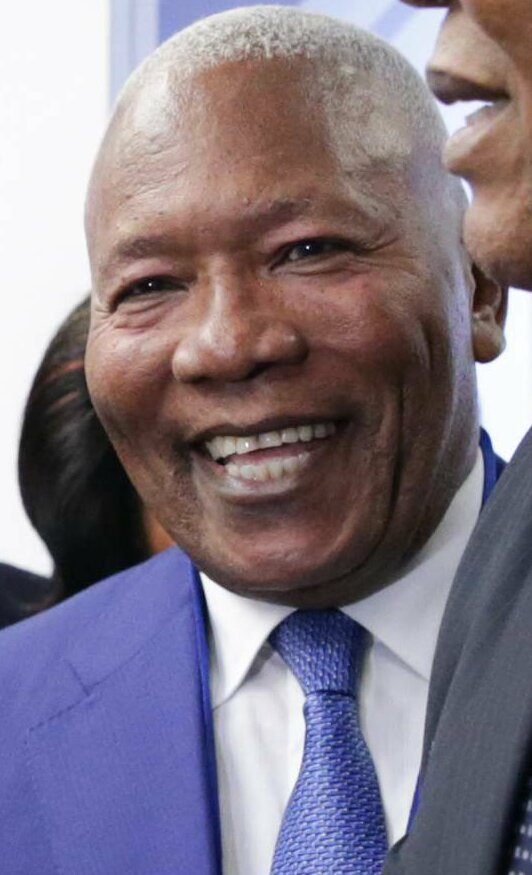
- Mvouba in 2019

President of the National Assembly of Congo
- Incumbent
- Assumed office 19 August 2017
- Preceded by: Justin Koumba

Prime Minister of Republic of the Congo
- In office 7 January 2005 – 15 September 2009
- President: Denis Sassou Nguesso
- Preceded by: Bernard Kolélas (1997)
- Succeeded by: Clément Mouamba (2016)

Personal details
- Born: 1954 (age 71–72) Kindamba, French Equatorial Africa (now Congo-Brazzaville)
- Party: Party of Labour

Isidore Mvouba (born 1954) is a Congolese politician who was Prime Minister of Congo-Brazzaville from 2005 to 2009. He is a member of the Congolese Labour Party (PCT, or Parti congolais du travail) and held key positions under President Denis Sassou Nguesso beginning in 1997.

Mvouba was director of the Cabinet of the Head of State from 1997 to 1999, minister of transport from 1999 to 2005 (with responsibility for coordinating government action beginning in 2002), and prime minister from January 2005 to September 2009. After his post of prime minister was eliminated, he instead served as minister of state for transport, responsible for coordinating ministries relating to infrastructure, from 2009 to 2012. Subsequently, he was minister of state for industrial development from 2012 to 2016. He has been President of the National Assembly since 2017.

== Political career ==
Mvouba was born at Kindamba, located in the Pool Region, and became a railways engineer, working at the Congo-Ocean Railway (Chemin de fer Congo-Océan) beginning in 1976. Unlike most southerners, he continued to support President Sassou Nguesso when multiparty politics was introduced in the early 1990s. When Sassou Nguesso stood as the PCT's candidate in the August 1992 presidential election, Mvouba served as his campaign director; Sassou Nguesso was badly defeated, placing third in the election. Pascal Lissouba, who won the election and succeeded Sassou Nguesso as president, invited Mvouba to take up a ministerial post in the government formed after the election, but Mvouba refused. Subsequently, on 25 December 1992, he was appointed as Minister of Youth and Sports in the power-sharing government of Prime Minister Claude Antoine Dacosta, which was to serve until a new parliamentary election was held in 1993.

Mvouba was spokesman of the pro-Sassou Nguesso United Democratic Forces during the June–October 1997 civil war. The civil war resulted in Sassou Nguesso's return to power in October 1997, and Mvouba was appointed as Director of the Cabinet of the Head of State (with the rank of Minister) at the end of the same month. He held that post until being appointed as Minister of Transport, Civil Aviation, and the Merchant Marine on 12 January 1999.

It was announced on 14 February 2002 that Mvouba had been appointed as Sassou Nguesso's campaign director for the March 2002 presidential election. Sassou Nguesso won this election with no meaningful competition. Subsequently, in the government named on 18 August 2002, Mvouba was promoted to the position of Minister of State for Transport, Privatization and Coordination of Government Action. He was appointed as prime minister, responsible for coordination of government action and privatization (although not head of government), on 7 January 2005. He was appointed as prime minister even though the 2002 constitution did not provide for that position.

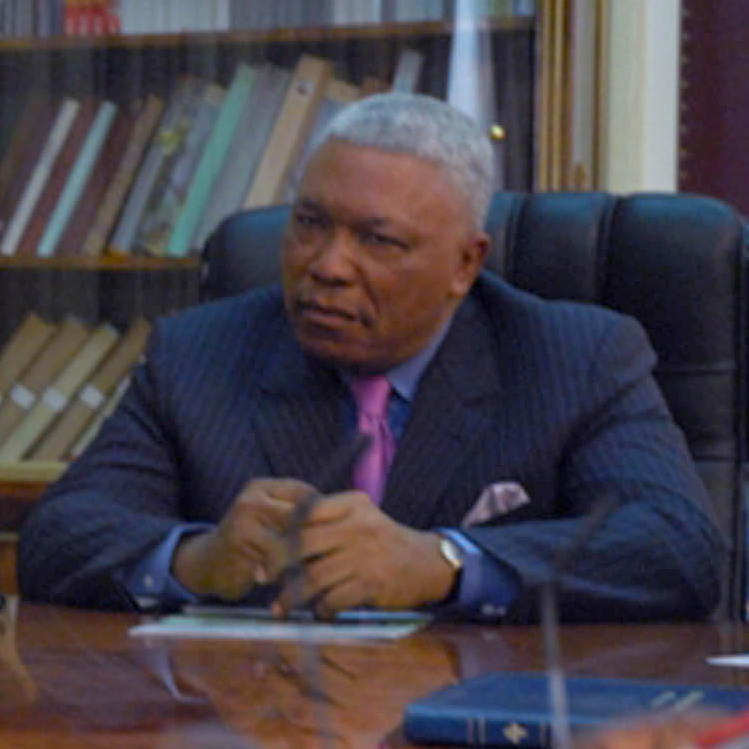
Isidore Mvouba in 2007

Mvouba was elected to the National Assembly as a PCT candidate from Kindamba constituency in the June–August 2007 parliamentary election, receiving 75.5% of the vote. Following the death of Senate President and PCT Secretary-General Ambroise Noumazalaye on 17 November 2007, Mvouba became Acting Secretary-General of the PCT.

At the time of the June 2008 local elections, Mvouba was President of the National Coordination of the Rally of the Presidential Majority (RMP), the coalition supporting Sassou-Nguesso. After Sassou-Nguesso was re-elected in the July 2009 presidential election, he appointed a new government on 15 September 2009, in which Mvouba's post of Prime Minister was eliminated; Mvouba was instead appointed as Minister of State for Transport, Civil Aviation, and the Merchant Marine. He remained the highest-ranking member of the government. The government was also reorganized into four broad sectors, with one minister assigned responsibility for coordinating each of the four sectors; Mvouba was one of the ministers chosen as a coordinator and was assigned the basic infrastructure sector.

Mvouba remained Acting Secretary-General of the PCT until 2011, when Pierre Ngolo was elected as Secretary-General at the PCT's sixth extraordinary congress. At the congress, held in July 2011, Mvouba remained a member of the PCT Political Bureau. A month after his election, Ngolo officially succeeded Mvouba as PCT Secretary-General on 25 August 2011.

Following the July–August 2012 parliamentary election, Mvouba was moved to the post of Minister of State for Industrial Development and the Promotion of the Private Sector on 25 September 2012.

In 2013, Mvouba spent over five months in Paris for health reasons. He eventually returned to Congo-Brazzaville on 19 September 2013. Upon his return, his office stated that he was in good condition and was returning to work.

After Sassou Nguesso's victory in the March 2016 presidential election, Mvouba was dismissed from the government on 30 April 2016. He was succeeded at his ministry by Gilbert Ondongo on 4 May 2016.

Following the July 2017 parliamentary election, Mvouba was elected as President of the National Assembly on 19 August 2017. He was the only candidate for the post and received 144 votes.

Political offices
Vacant Title last held by Bernard Kolélas	Prime Minister of Congo-Brazzaville; 2005–2009	Vacant Title next held by Clément Mouamba
