= Congolese Trade Union Confederation =

Trade union centre in Republic of the Congo

CSC
- Congolese Trade Union Confederation
- Confédération Syndicale Congolaise
- Founded: 1964
- Location: Republic of the Congo
- Key people: Jean-Michel Bokamba-Yangouma, general secretary
- Affiliations: WFTU

The Congolese Trade Union Confederation (Confédération syndicale congolaise, CSC) is a trade union centre in Republic of the Congo.

Seeking greater political reform and the establishment of multiparty politics, the CSC unsuccessfully sought its independence from the ruling Congolese Labour Party (PCT) in 1990. It led a general strike and protests in September–October 1990, causing the PCT regime to allow the creation of other political parties and leading to the 1991 National Conference.

Jean-Michel Bokamba-Yangouma was the Secretary-General of the CSC from 1974 to 1997. An ally of President Pascal Lissouba, he fled into exile at the end of the 1997 civil war.

The CSC is affiliated with the World Federation of Trade Unions.
