= Come Mankasse =

Republic of the Congo politician

- Occupation: Politician
- Political party: Congolese Union of Republicans

Come Mankasse was a candidate in the 2002 Republic of the Congo presidential election who stood for the Congolese Union of Republicans. He gained 1.25% of the vote.
