= 2002 Republic of the Congo presidential election =

- 10 March 2002
- Registered: 1,733,943
- Turnout: 74.70%
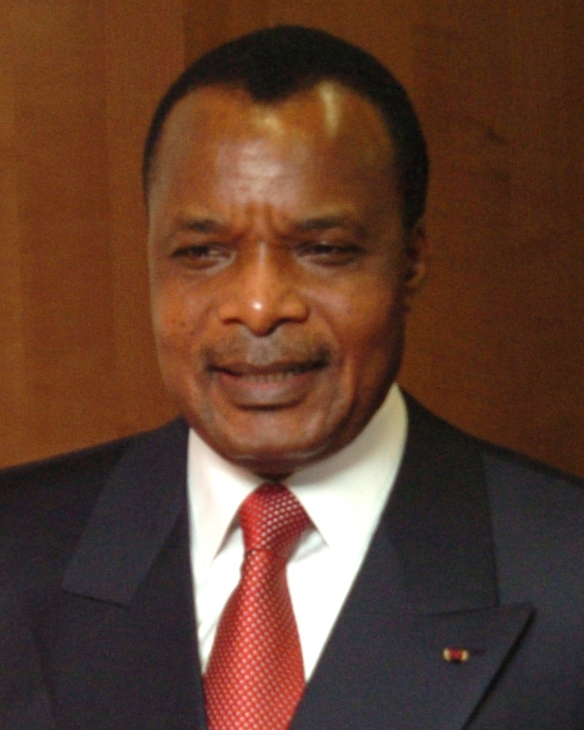

Nominee	Denis Sassou Nguesso	Joseph Kignoumbi Kia Mboungou
Party	PCT–FDU	UPADS
Popular vote	1,075,247	33,154
Percentage	89.41%	2.76%
President before election
Denis Sassou Nguesso
PCT
Elected President
Denis Sassou Nguesso
PCT

Presidential elections were held in the Republic of the Congo on 10 March 2002. They followed the country's second civil war (1997-1999), which returned Denis Sassou Nguesso to power, and a subsequent transitional period, in which a new constitution was written and approved by referendum in January 2002.

The election lacked meaningful opposition participation, as the main opposition leaders—particularly former President Pascal Lissouba of the Pan-African Union for Social Democracy (UPADS) and former Prime Minister Bernard Kolélas of the Congolese Movement for Democracy and Integral Development (MCDDI)—were in exile, prevented from returning to Congo by legal convictions and sentences that were handed down in absentia. The only important opposition figure left to contest the election was former Prime Minister André Milongo of the Union for Democracy and the Republic (UDR), but he withdrew a few days before the election, claiming that it would be fraudulent.

Sassou Nguesso, standing as the candidate of his own Congolese Labour Party (PCT) and a coalition, the United Democratic Forces (FDU), was overwhelmingly elected, receiving nearly 90% of the vote against a field of minor challengers. He was sworn in on 14 August 2002 in a ceremony at the Palace of Congress in Brazzaville in the presence of seven other African heads of state.

== Results ==
Provisional results were announced by the Minister of the Interior, Pierre Oba, on 13 March 2002; final results, which were only slightly different from the provisional results, were proclaimed by the Supreme Court on 29 March. There were 1,733,943 registered voters at the time of the election, 1,295,319 of whom voted. 92,706 votes were invalid, leaving 1,202,611 valid votes. 1,075,247 of those votes went to Sassou Nguesso.

Candidate	Party	Votes	%
Denis Sassou Nguesso	PCT–FDU	1,075,247	89.41
Kignomba Kia Mbougou	Pan-African Union for Social Democracy	33,154	2.76
Angèle Bandou	Party of the Poor	27,849	2.32
Jean Félix Demba Telo	Independent	20,252	1.68
Luc Adamo Mateta	Convention for Democracy and Salvation	19,074	1.59
Come Mankasse	Congolese Union of Republicans	15,054	1.25
Bonaventure Mizidy	Republican and Liberal Party	11,981	1.00
Total		1,202,611	100.00
Valid votes		1,202,611	92.84
Invalid/blank votes		92,708	7.16
Total votes		1,295,319	100.00
Registered voters/turnout		1,733,943	74.70
Source: African Elections Database
