= N'kosso =

- Location in the Republic of the Congo
- Coordinates: 3°59′S 13°55′E
- Country: Republic of the Congo
- Region: Bouenza Region
- District: Mouyondzi District

N'kosso (called by villagers "La Chine") is a small village situated in Mouyondzi District, some 250 km from the town called Nkayi in the Bouenza region of Republic of Congo.

People from N'kosso speak Bembe and French. The village is surrounded by mountains and thick forests. People of the village survive by picking up fruits from the forests, fishing and agriculture. Their means of transport is mainly by bicycles. The village has no electricity, and insufficient water supply from rained water points. There is one primary and one secondary school. When there is a full moon, they dance traditional dances.

The available medical facility is a small clinic that is too small to accommodate villagers in a large numbers. Villagers tend to use traditional medicine in case of illness as sometimes the clinic runs out of medicines, so the percentage of cholera is higher than elsewhere in Republic of Congo.

Otherwise it is a tourist attraction village with friendly wild animals and natural spring waters.
