= Mouyondzi District =

Coordinates: 3°59′S 13°55′E

Mouyondzi
- District
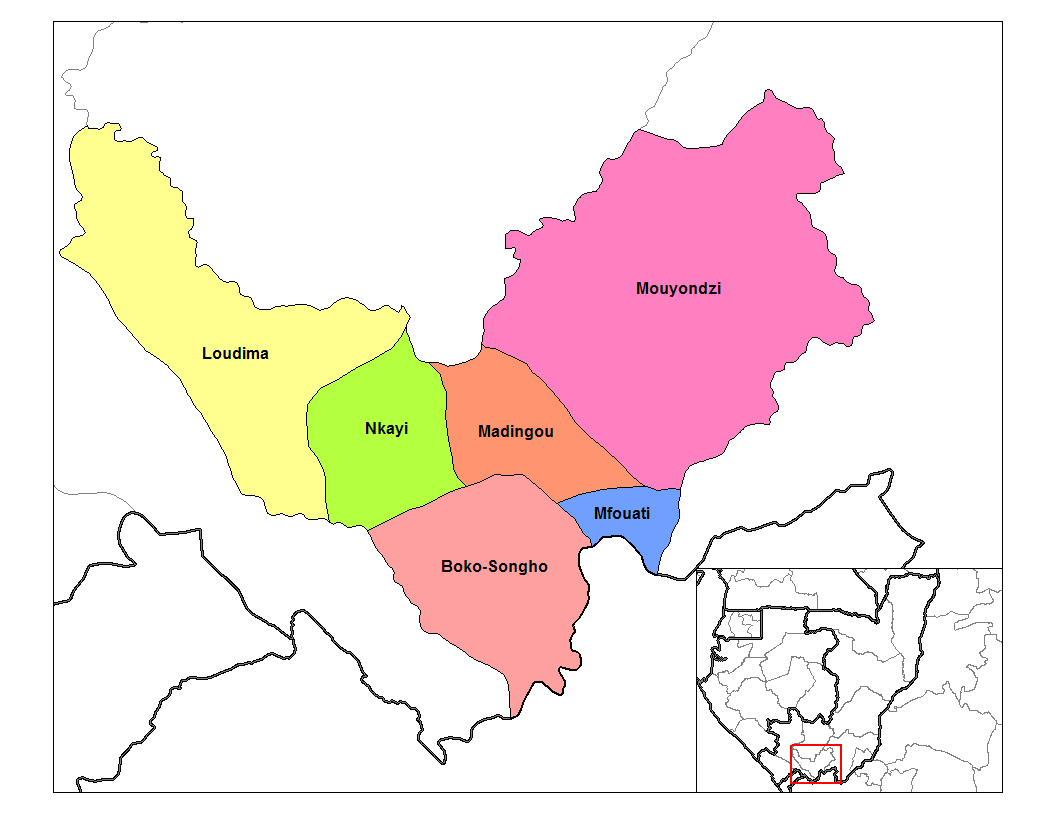
- Mouyondzi District in the region
- Country: Republic of the Congo
- Department: Bouenza Department

Area
  - Total: 273.9 sq mi (709.4 km^{2})

Population (2023 census)
  - Total: 37,863
  - Density: 138.2/sq mi (53.37/km^{2})
- Time zone: UTC+1 (GMT +1)

Mouyondzi (can also be written as Muyonzi or Muyondzi) is a district in the Bouenza Region of southern Republic of the Congo. The capital lies at Mouyondzi.

Moyondzi's population mostly consists of Beembe.

== Towns and villages ==
- Bosso II
- Dingi
- Gamobalé
- Kibamba
- Kibiti
- Kingola
- Kingomo
- Kingouala
- Kinkouambala
- Madoungou
- Mingali
- Moudzanga
- Mouyondzi
- Ngolé
- N'kosso
- Tsiaki
- Tsomono
- Yamba
