= Congolese Union of Republicans =

Political party in the Republic of the Congo

The Congolese Union of Republicans is a minor political party in the Republic of Congo. It ran Come Mankasse in the 2002 Republic of the Congo presidential election, earning 1.25% of the vote and losing out to incumbent Dennis Sassou Nguesso.
