= Destinée Doukaga =

Politician, writer, and pilot in the Republic of the Congo

Destinée Hermella Doukaga (born 1983) is a politician, writer, and pilot in the Republic of the Congo. She is the leader of the Patriotic Front party and has served as minister of youth and civic education from 2016 to 2021, then minister of tourism from 2021 to 2022.

== Early life and education ==
Doukaga was born 1983 in Dolisie, the capital of the Republic of the Congo's Niari department. Her childhood was marked by the absence of her father and the early death of her mother.

Her name is sometimes written Destinée Armelia Doukaga or Destinée Ermela Doukaga.

Doukaga is trained as a pilot, having learned to fly in Belgium after graduating with a degree in mechanical engineering from Marien Ngouabi University. She worked as a Dassault Mirage F1 mechanic, then as a professional pilot.

After entering politics, she returned to school thorough distance learning, studying public administration at the University of Poitiers in France.

== Political career ==
Doukaga is the national leader of the Patriotic Front (Front Patriotique, abbreviated FP), a party she founded in December 2015. The party is aligned with the presidential majority of Denis Sassou Nguesso and his Congolese Party of Labour. Its stated aim is to defend republican values and build a "strong Congolese nation."

In April 2016, she was appointed as the Republic of the Congo's minister of youth and civic education. When she was chosen for the post at age 33, she became the youngest member of the country's cabinet at the time. After Sassou Nguesso's reelection, in May 2021, she was shifted to the role of minister of tourism and leisure. When the ruling party was reelected in 2022, she passed that role on to Lydie Pongault that September.

Doukaga also represents Nyanga district in the National Assembly.

She has been a member, since 2008, of the Forum for African Women Educationalists, and has worked to promote women's role in development.

== Writing ==
Doukaga is also an author of several books, targeting a Congolese audience. Her first book, Mon labyrinthe, was published in 2014. It is an autobiographical novel about a young orphan girl's struggle for survival.

Subsequent works include Hero dans mes veines, Terre battue, and Chant du coeur.

Her latest book, the short story collection Moi, Président, was published in 2019.

== Selected works ==
- Mon labyrinthe, Éditions Édilivre, 2014.
- Héros dans mes veines, Éditions Édilivre, 2014.
- Terre battue, Éditions du Panthéon, 2015.
- Chants du cœur, L'Harmattan, 2016.
- Moi, Président, L’Harmattan, 2019.
