= Permanent Action for the Congo =

Political party in the Republic of the Congo

Permanent Action for the Congo Action permanente pour le Congo
- Abbreviation: APC
- President: Rodrigue Malanda-Samba
- Founded: 18 May 2013
- Colors: Blue
- National Assembly: 1 / 151

Website
- dbs.cg/apc/

The Permanent Action for the Congo (French: Action permanente pour le Congo) (APC) is a political party in the Republic of the Congo.

== Electoral history ==
- 2022 Republic of the Congo parliamentary election: 1 seat

== See also ==
- Politics of the Republic of the Congo
