= Jean-Marie Mokoko =

Congolese politician

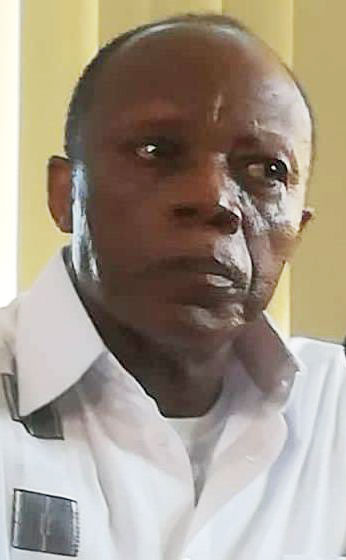
- Mokoko in Brazzaville, 7 May 2018
- Born: Jean-Marie Michel Mokoko; 19 March 1947 (age 79); Mossaka, Cuvette, Republic of the Congo
- Occupations: Soldier, politician

Jean-Marie Michel Mokoko (born 19 March 1947) is a Congolese general and politician. He served as Chief of General Staff of the Armed Forces of the Republic of the Congo and was advisor to President Denis Sassou-Nguesso. He was a candidate for the presidential election of March 2016, where he won 13.74% of the vote and came third out of nine candidates. He did not recognize the re-election of Denis Sassou Nguesso, who had been in power for more than 35 years, and called for civil disobedience. He was arrested in June 2016 and sentenced on 11 May 2018 to 20 years in prison for "endangering the internal security of the state".

== Early years ==
Jean-Marie Michel Mokoko was born on 19 March 1947 in Mossaka, Cuvette province, Republic of the Congo. He attended the General Leclerc Military Preparatory School in Brazzaville. He then prepared for the entrance examination to the École spéciale militaire de Saint-Cyr and to the preparatory classes for Saint-Cyr at the Lycée Dumont d'Urville in Toulon. In 1970 he joined the École spéciale militaire de Saint-Cyr. During this period the school was directed by Brigadier General Jean Richard.

From 1970 to 1972, Mokoko was an officer cadet belonging to promotion No. 157 "General de Gaulle". as were the former Ivorian and Senegalese Chiefs of Staff of the Armed Forces, General Mathias Doué and General Babacar Gaye, the late General Celestin Ilunga Shamanga, Chief of Staff of Marshal Mobutu Sese Seko and the following French officers: General Bernard Périco, former Commander of the Paris Fire Brigade, Lieutenant General Jean-Loup Moreau and General Elrick Irastorza, former Chief of Staff of the French Army.

The two Congolese of this promotion were Emmanuel Eta Onka, Jean-Marie Michel Mokoko and formerly Sébastien Goma. Jean-Marie Michel Mokoko was also from the same promotion as the following Senegalese soldiers: Colonel Mbaye Faye (former sub-CEM), Colonel of Gendarmerie Alioune Badara Niang (former DG of the Autonomous Port of Dakar as was Pathé Ndiaye) General Abdoulaye Dieng (former Ambassador of Senegal to Guinea-Bissau) and Intendant Colonel Oumar Niang (former Military Attaché in Morocco).

Mokoko continued his studies at the School of Engineering Application in Angers. He then graduated from the staff college in Compiègne.

== Career ==
From 1977 to 1983 Mokoko was central director of Engineering. At the time, Colonel Victor Ntsikakabala was Chief of the General Staff. From 1983 to 1987 Mokoko was Commander of the Autonomous Zone of Brazzaville and of the 3rd Motorized Infantry Regiment. From 1984 to 1987 he was also Commander of the Land Forces, under the command of Colonel Emmanuel Elenga, Chief of the General Staff. From 1987 to 1993 he was Chief of the General Staff of the Congolese Armed Forces. On 1 January 1990 he was elevated to the rank of brigadier general with Louis Sylvain-Goma, Raymond Damase Ngollo, Emmanuel Ngouélondélé Mongo and Norbert Dabira.

During the advent of democracy, Mokoko tried to depoliticize the armed forces in order to reduce the influence of the military in Congolese political life.

=== National experience ===
- Conferences of UDEAC Chiefs of Staff, Yaoundé, Cameroon (1990).
- Securing the Assizes of the National Conference, Congo (1991).
- Participation in definition of the modalities of the organization of the electoral ballots as President of the Security Commission, Congo (1992).
- Negotiator between the opposition and the presidential majority following the crisis arising from the refusal of the authorities at the time to take note of the motion of censure overthrowing the Government of Stéphane Maurice Bongho-Nouarra (first government of President Pascal Lissouba), Congo Brazzaville, 1992.
- Negotiator of the formation of the transitional government (60/40) headed by Prime Minister Claude Antoine Dacosta (December 1992 - June 1993) to prepare for the early legislative elections.
- Mokoko was Chairman of the Monitoring Committee for the agreements of 2 December 1992 between the opposition parties and the Presidential Movement, following the consultation proposed and conducted by the Armed Forces.
- On 18 July 1993 Mokoko resigned from his duties as Chief of the General Staff and went into exile in France.

=== International experience ===
- Consultant to the International Commission of Jurists (ICJ), Geneva (Switzerland), in collaboration with the NGO Synergie Africa in the field of conflict prevention and resolution under the authority of the Secretary General of the ICJ, Adama Dieng (1994 -1996).
- Participation in the definition of the terms of reference of the President Julius Nyerere initiative on the Burundi crisis in association with Synergie Africa and the Carter Initiative, Geneva (Switzerland), 1995.
- Participation in the extraordinary session of the Peace and Security Council of the African Union on the situation in Côte d'Ivoire, Addis Ababa, Ethiopia (November 2004).
- Participation in the 1st International Conference on the Great Lakes Region (ICGLR), Dar es Salaam, Tanzania (November 2004).
- Participation in the meeting of ministers of the Committee of Six Heads of State on the Non-Aggression and Common Defense Pact, Accra, Ghana (January 2005).
- Regular participation in summits of Heads of State and Government of the African Union and the Peace and Security Council of the AU.
- Co-chair of the group of experts of the Contact Group set up by the African Union (following the Tripoli Agreements of February 8, 2006 and Dakar of March 13, 2008) - Responsible for planning a peace and security on the border of Chad and Sudan.
- Participation in the meetings of the five heads of state on the Libyan crisis (2011).
- Participation in the rise of the African-led International Support Mission to Mali (January to July 1, 2013).

=== Positions held ===
From October 15, 2014 to February 21, 2016 (date on which he was replaced by Professor Hacen El Lebatt, former Mauritanian Minister of Foreign Affairs).

- Special Representative of the Chairperson of the African Union Commission, and Head of the African Union Mission in the Central African Republic and Central Africa (MISAC).
- President of the G8 (the group of 8 composed of: the African Union, the United Nations, the European Union, the Economic Community of Central African States (ECCAS), France, the United States of America, Congo Brazzaville, the World Bank).
- The assigned missions of the G8 were to implement the Security Council resolutions on the Central African Republic:
  - restoration of peace and democracy,
  - restoration of state authority,
  - securing the territory,
  - installation of the transitional authorities in Bangui and in the interior of the country,
  - organization of the first round of presidential and legislative elections before December 31, 2015.

From November 28, 2013 to October 15, 2014 (one month after the transfer of authority from MISCA to MINUSCA)

- Special Representative of the Chairperson of the African Union Commission, and Head of the International Support Mission to the Central African Republic under African leadership (MISCA)
- From August to December 2013 (before taking up his post in Bangui on December 14, 2013) Mokoko, Division General (2nd section) was:
  - Deputy of Pierre Buyoya, high representative of the President of the African Union Commission for Mali and Sahel, Head of MISAHEL (from February 22, 2013 to August 1, 2013)
  - Special advisor to the high representative of the President of the Commission of the African Union, Head of the International Support Mission in Mali (MISMA) from February 22, 2013 to August 1, 2013.
  - Head of the African Union liaison office in Bamako, principal political advisor to the high representative of the chairperson of the African Union commission, head of the international support mission in Mali and the Sahel (from December 27, 2012 to March 6, 2013).

2006-2007: Special representative of the current president of the African Union for Côte d'Ivoire and President of the mediation group in the Ivorian crisis (he was based in Abidjan).

2005-2013: special advisor to the Congolese head of state, head of the peace and collective security department in Africa.

At the end of July 2015 General Mokoko, then stationed in Bangui on behalf of the African Union and at the same time still adviser to President Sassou-Nguesso in matters of security, spoke out against the change of the constitution which was to allow the President of the Republic in office to run for a third term. In the process, his popularity increased. Originally from the same region as the outgoing President, a general officer like him, he then appeared as his most formidable adversary. His statements were photocopied and resold in the street.

=== 2016 presidential election ===
On 9 February 2016, as he left the Central African Republic, to formalize his candidacy for the early presidential election of 20 March, Jean-Marie Michel Mokoko was received at Brazzaville international airport by a militia close to the power of Brazzaville that threw stones and launched tear gas.

On 13 February, Jean-Marie Michel Mokoko formalized his candidacy through a speech at the Brazzaville convention center in the presence of several leaders of the Congolese opposition.

On 15 February at Maya-Maya Airport, Mokoko was banned from flying to Pointe-Noire. The same day, a video was broadcast by the Congolese national television channel showing the General planning a coup. This information circulated on the internet and social networks.

A meeting was held the same day at the home of Aimé Emmanuel Yoka, Minister of Justice and maternal uncle of President Sassou-Nguesso, at the end of which the public prosecutor, André Oko Ngakala, made a statement on national television. He ordered the immediate arrest of Mokoko on 17 February 2016, and the start of his questioning without delay. The public prosecutor referred to articles 12 and 29 of the code of penal procedure. Mokoko would attend these summons to the General Directorate of Territorial Surveillance (DGST)

On 7 March 2016 in Brazzaville, during a press conference, Mokoko presented his presidential program. Addressing the question on his legal disputes, Mokoko stated "that he never wanted to escape the action of the justice of his country, while regretting this relentlessness against his person. In a self-respecting state, when it is an election period, and one of the candidates has had his candidacy validated, without legal action being ruled out, common sense would order that these arrests be suspended to let the candidate campaign”.

Mokoko ended up collecting 13.74% of the vote and came third out of nine candidates. After Denis Sassou-Nguesso's contested victory in the 2016 presidential election, on 24 March Mokoko launched an appeal to the Congolese people, encouraging them to revolt and to act in civil disobedience.

=== Imprisonment ===
From 4 April 2016, a few weeks after the end of the presidential election, Mokoko was placed under house arrest. On 14 June 2016, he was summoned by the General Directorate of Territorial Surveillance (DGST) and was imprisoned. On 16 June he was presented to the public prosecutor, André Oko Ngakala, as well as to the senior judge. Accused of "undermining the internal security of the State", as well as "illegal possession of weapons and ammunition of war", he was placed under arrest warrant (detained in the Brazzaville remand center). The charge of “inciting public disorder” was then added. His family was not allowed to visit him, and said they were threatened by “regime thugs”.

Mokoko remained in prison for two years before being tried in 2018. During his trial, Mokoko invoked his immunity, then his right to silence. An arms expert, summoned by the Court, refused to testify concerning the weapons found at his home. In addition, the main witness, supposed to support the accusation that he wanted to organize a coup, did not appear at trial. Étienne Arnaud, one of the three French lawyers of the accused, denounced a trial that was "exuberant and crudely political, with delusional decisions, wringing the neck of Congolese law". A two-page handwritten letter, written by Mokoko during his detention, was also made public by the French newspaper Le Monde, in which he says he "came up against the totalitarian machine”, which he considered to be helped by “foreign accomplices".

On 11 May 2018, Jean-Marie Mokoko was sentenced to 20 years in prison for "endangering the internal security of the State". He then qualifies his trial as a “political settling of scores”. In August 2018, the United Nations Human Rights Council's Working Group on Arbitrary Detention concluded that the detention of Jean-Marie Mokoko (including his house arrest after the presidential election, as well as his pre-trial detention for two years) was “arbitrary” and advocates his immediate release as well as a “right of reparation”. The government then denounced a biased approach, ensuring that the rights of the defense have been respected and refusing this release.

In May 2019, his lawyers, who were no longer authorized to visit him, denounced the tightening of his conditions of detention. The Congolese Human Rights Observatory (OCDH), a Congolese NGO, also denounces this hardening, affecting not only Jean-Marie Mokoko, but also other imprisoned opponents, who no longer have the right to any visits. In September 2019, the French Minister of Foreign Affairs, Jean-Yves Le Drian, raised the case of Mokoko and other opponents with President Denis Sassou Nguesso, declaring that he expected actions from him towards them.

In October 2019, Jean-Marie Mokoko's lawyers asked the Minister of Justice to grant him an exit permit, so that he could attend the funeral of his mother, Louise Ongagna, who died at the age of 92, and of which he was the only child. He was finally granted a leave of absence for a few hours by the Brazzaville tribunal de grande instance, but Jean-Marie Mokoko refused to accept it and attend the funeral, considering it unfair that he was only allowed a few hours when other convicts are usually entitled to five days.

=== Health ===
After he had been imprisoned for four years, Mokoko's health deteriorated sharply during the summer of 2020. First presented by his relatives and his lawyers as having been contaminated by the Covid-19, the latter denied this a few days later, specifying that he was in fact suffering from an attack of acute malaria and hypertension. Victim of discomfort on 29 June in his cell, he was transferred to the military hospital in Brazzaville on 2 July. On July 30, after solicitation from his lawyers, NGOs and political opponents, Denis Sassou-Nguesso authorized his medical evacuation to Turkey, where he was admitted to the Ankara military hospital. DRC President Félix Tshisekedi and Angolan President João Lourenço have also pleaded in his favor, according to his lawyers. On August 30, after a month of treatment in Turkey, he was repatriated to Brazzaville, his state of health having improved.

== Decorations ==
- 1987: Dignity of Grand Officer of Congolese Merit
- 1990; Commander of the French Legion of Honor
- 2014: Commander of the Central African Reconnaissance Order

== Publications ==
- Mokoko, Jean-Marie Michel (1996), Congo : Le temps du devoir, ISBN 2-7384-3372-3

== Sources ==
- "Affaire Mokoko : Tshisekedi et Lourenço ont-ils plaidé pour l'évacuation de l'opposant congolais ?", Jeune Afrique (in French), 9 July 2020
- Arsène Séverin (9 May 2019), "L'OCDH préoccupé par de mauvaises conditions de détention dans les prisons congolaises", VOA (in French)
- Arsène Séverin (23 October 2019b), La défense de Mokoko demande sa libération pour des obsèques familiales (in French)
- Communiqué du 18-05-2000 (in French), Gouvernement du Sénégal
- "Congo-B.: Jean-Marie Michel Mokoko est de nouveau à Brazzaville", RFI (in French), 30 August 2020
- "Congo-B: les autorités acceptent de faire évacuer Mokoko pour des soins en Turquie", RFI (in French), 30 July 2020
- Congo-B: les conditions de détention d'un opposant dénoncées par ses avocats (in French), RFI, 2 May 2019
- "Congo-Brazzaville: le général Mokoko condamné à vingt ans de prison", Le Monde (in French), 11 May 2018
- "Congo-Brazzaville: l'opposant Mokoko n'assistera pas aux obsèques de sa mère", RFI (in French), 26 October 2019
- "Congo : Jean-Marie Michel Mokoko reste en prison", Le Monde (in French), 18 August 2016
- "Congo: un opposant à Denis Sassou-Nguesso appelle à la révolte populaire", Le Monde (in French), 24 March 2016
- "Décret du 21 juillet 2003", JORF (in French) (175): 13097, 31 July 2003
- "Décret du 26 juin 2008 portant affectation d'officiers généraux", JORF (in French) (149), 27 June 2008
- Decret n° 2002-14 du 15 janvier 2002 portant nomination du général de brigade Abdoulaye Dieng en qualité d'Ambassadeur extraordinaire et plénipotentiaire de la République du Sénégal en Guinée Bissau (in French), Gouvernement du Sénégal, archived from the original on 2021-10-01
- Fatoumata Diallo (19 November 2018), Congo-Brazzaville : le gouvernement répond au groupe de travail de l'ONU dans l'affaire Mokoko (in French)
- Jean-Baptiste Mondze (5 August 2020), "Congo : Jean-Marie Michel Mokoko, un général en exil sanitaire (2/4)", Jeune Afrique (in French)
- Joan Tilouine (9 May 2018), " Il ne me reste que mon honneur ", écrit le général Mokoko depuis sa prison de Brazzaville (in French)
- Liste alphabétique des Officiers de la GDG, Association promotion no 157 Général de Gaulle
- Paris "attend des actes" du président Sassou envers l'opposant emprisonné Mokoko (in French), 3 September 2019
- Viviane Forson (17 June 2016), "Le général Mokoko mis aux arrêts à Brazzaville", Le Point (in French)
