= Patriotic Front (Republic of the Congo) =

Patriotic Front Front patriotique
- Abbreviation: FP
- Founder: Destinée Doukaga
- Founded: 27 December 2015
- Ideology: Nationalism
- Political position: Right wing
- Colors: Brown
- National Assembly: 1 / 151

The Patriotic Front (French: Front patriotique) (FP) is a political party of the Republic of the Congo.

It was founded in 27 December 2015 by Destinée Doukaga.

== Electoral results ==
=== Senate ===
Senate elections
Year	Seats
2017	1 / 72
