= List of presidents of the Senate of the Republic of the Congo =

The president of the Senate of the Republic of the Congo is the presiding officer of the upper chamber of the legislature of Republic of the Congo.

This is a list of presidents of the Senate of the Republic of the Congo, which was established in 1992:

Name	Entered office	Left office	Notes
Augustin Poignet	1992	1997	
Ambroise Édouard Noumazalaye	2002	November 17, 2007	
André Obami Itou	1 December 2007	12 September 2017	
Pierre Ngolo	12 September 2017	Incumbent	
