= André Obami Itou =

Congolese politician (1940–2024)

André Obami Itou (26 September 1940 – 23 April 2024) was a Congolese politician. He was a leading figure in the Congolese Labour Party (PCT) from the 1970s, and was the President of the Senate of Congo-Brazzaville from 2007 to 2017.

== Political career ==
An ethnic Teke, Obami Itou was born at Epouéné, Gamboma, located in Plateaux Region. He began working at the Ministry of Defense in 1965. Obami Itou was a founding member of the PCT in December 1969, and he was first councillor at the Congolese embassy in Algeria from 1969 to 1971. He became government commissioner, or prefect, of Bouenza Region in 1971, and he joined the PCT Central Committee in 1972; he remained on the Central Committee throughout the PCT's single-party rule.

Obami Itou was the director-general of the Kinsoundi textile factory from 1973 to 1974, an ambassador-at-large from 1975 to 1976, and director-general of the national oil refinery from 1976 to 1978. In 1979, he briefly served as Administrator-Mayor of Brazzaville, the capital; subsequently he was political commissioner of the Pool Region from 1980 to 1984.

At the PCT's Third Ordinary Congress, held on 27–31 July 1984, Obami Itou was elected as President of the PCT Control and Verification Commission. He remained in that post until July 1987, when he was instead designated as the PCT Central Committee's Secretary for Organization. Obami Itou, who was known as a loyalist of President Denis Sassou Nguesso, thereby gained power over party organization at the expense of Camille Boungou, who was identified with the PCT's M-22 faction. Obami Itou was elected to the PCT Political Bureau at the party's Fourth Ordinary Congress on 26–31 July 1989 and assigned responsibility for foreign relations. In mid-1990, he was included as one of five members of the Secretariat of the PCT Central Committee, in charge of foreign relations. Later, he was appointed as the Administrator-Delegate of Hydro-Congo, the country's oil exploration and exploitation company, on 31 December 1999; he held that position until 2002.

In 2002, Obami Itou headed the PCT's candidate list for Gamboma in the local election for the Regional Council; subsequently he was elected to the Senate as a candidate in Plateaux Region in July 2002. He was elected by the Senate as President of the Commission for Foreign Affairs, Regional Integration, and Development Cooperation on 23 August 2002. When the Pan-African Parliament began meeting in March 2004, Obami Itou became one of Congo's five members.

Ambroise Noumazalaye, the President of the Senate, died on 17 November 2007, and Obami Itou was elected to succeed him on 1 December 2007 to serve out the remainder of his term, ending in 2008. As President of the Senate, Obami Itou would, according to the constitution, succeed President Sassou Nguesso in an interim capacity if Sassou Nguesso were to die in office. Standing as a candidate of the Rally for a Presidential Majority (RMP), he was re-elected as a Senator from Plateaux Region in the August 2008 Senate election with the unanimous support of the 61 electors in Plateaux. Obami Itou was then re-elected as President of the Senate on 12 August 2008. Obami Itou remained a member of the PCT Political Bureau as of 2007, and he was the PCT's Permanent Secretary for Foreign Relations as of 2008.

Following the October 2011 Senate election, Obami Itou was re-elected as President of the Senate on 24 October 2011, receiving 67 out of 69 votes.

Obami Itou was re-elected to the Senate in October 2014 as a PCT candidate in Plateaux, receiving all of the 61 possible votes. He was re-elected as President of the Senate on 28 October 2014, receiving 69 votes.
