= Perspectives and Realities Club =

Political party in the Republic of the Congo

Perspectives and Realities Club Club Perspectives et Réalités
- Abbreviation: CPR
- President: Aimé Hydvert Mouagni
- Colors: Blue
- National Assembly: 1 / 151

The Perspectives and Realities Club (French: Club Perspectives et Réalités) (CPR) is a political party in the Republic of the Congo. It is led by Aimé Hydvert Mouagni.

== Electoral history ==
- 2022 Republic of the Congo parliamentary election: 1 seat

== See also ==
- List of political parties in the Republic of the Congo
