= Party of the Poor (Republic of the Congo) =

Populist political party in the Republic of Congo

The Party of the Poor (French: Parti des pauvres) was a populist political party in the Republic of Congo.

== History ==
The Party of the Poor was founded in 1991, by the nun and politician Angèle Bandou, formerly a member of the Rassemblement pour la Défense des Pauvres et des Chomeurs au Congo. As the first ever woman to do so in Congo-Brazzaville, she ran for president in the 1992 presidential election, receiving less than 1% of the popular vote.

Bandou and the Party of the Poor ran again for president, in the 2002 presidential election. She received 27,849 votes and came in third place.

On 26 August 2004, Angèle Bandou was assassinated by unknown assailants in her home. According to some sources, the murder was carried out on orders of President Denis Sassou Nguesso.
