= 2008 Republic of the Congo Senate election =

An indirect Senate election was held in the Republic of the Congo on 5 August 2008. 42 of the 72 seats in the Senate were at stake in this election, with six elected from each of seven departments. The Senate was expanded by six members at the time of this election to account for the creation of Pointe-Noire Department. The senators were elected by councillors who were in turn elected in local elections on June 29, 2008. A presidential decree on July 24, 2008, stated that an electoral college to elect senators from seven departments—Pointe-Noire, Niari, Lekoumou, Pool, Plateaux, Cuvette West, and Likouala—would meet on August 5. In the election, there were a total of 133 candidates across the six departments where the election was being held. 33 candidates of the Rally of the Presidential Majority (RMP), which supports President Denis Sassou Nguesso, were elected to the Senate, in addition to seven independent candidates and two candidates of the opposition Pan-African Union for Social Democracy (UPADS).

Following the election, the Senate met on August 12, 2008, and elected its bureau. In the vote, conducted by secret ballot, a single list of candidates was presented and approved. André Obami Itou was re-elected as President of the Senate, Benjamin Bounkoulou was re-elected as First Vice-president, and Vincent Ganga was elected to the previously vacant post of Second Vice-president. Philomène Fouti Soungou was elected as First Secretary and Dominique Lekoyi was elected as Second Secretary.
