= 2016 Republic of the Congo presidential election =

- 20 March 2016
- Registered: 2,161,839
- Turnout: 68.92% (▲2.50pp)
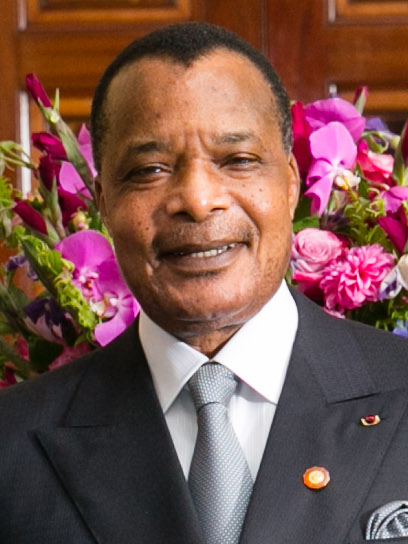

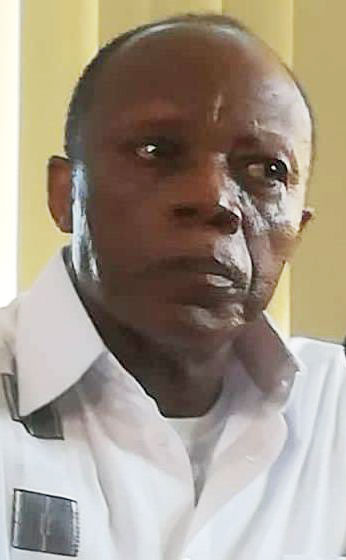
Nominee	Denis Sassou Nguesso	Guy Brice Parfait Kolélas	Jean-Marie Mokoko
Party	PCT	MCDDI	Independent
Popular vote	838,922	209,632	191,562
Percentage	60.19%	15.04%	13.74%
President before election
Denis Sassou Nguesso
PCT
Elected President
Denis Sassou Nguesso
PCT

Presidential elections were held in the Republic of the Congo on 20 March 2016. It was the first election to be held under the new constitution that had been passed by referendum in 2015. President Denis Sassou Nguesso, who had exhausted the two-term limit imposed by the previous constitution, was allowed to run again due to the adoption of the new constitution. He won re-election in the first round of voting, receiving 60% of the vote.

== Electoral system ==
The President of the Republic of the Congo is elected using the two-round system.

On 14 January 2016 a law was adopted creating a new electoral commission, the Independent National Election Commission (Commission nationale électorale indépendante, CNEI), replacing the National Commission for the Organisation of Elections (Commission nationale d’organisation des élections, CONEL). The law was the result of dialogue between government and opposition parties. The CNEI is composed of members of both government and opposition parties, as well as civil society, and unlike the CONEL it is set up to be independent and financially autonomous.

Ballot papers also changed in line with demands by the opposition, moving to a single ballot paper. While parties were already entitled to have representatives at all polling stations, their agreement in certifying the vote count is now mandatory. These changes have been noted by the opposition, which has welcomed progress made.

All adults over the age of 18 can vote and the CNEI's mission also includes voter registration. A campaign was launched to encourage more citizens to register to vote, beginning in January 2016 and ending on 15 February.

A decree issued by the Minister of the Interior on 1 February 2016 scheduled the official campaign period to run from 4 March to midnight on 18 March 2016. The period for the submission of applications to stand as presidential candidates was set to run from 5 February to 20 February. Among the information and documentation required for the applications was a medical certificate, and prospective candidates were required to pay a deposit of 25,000,000 CFA francs, which could not be refunded.

== Candidates ==
A new constitution passed by referendum in 2015 enabled term-limited President Denis Sassou Nguesso to run for re-election. As expected, the ruling Congolese Labour Party (PCT) announced on 25 January 2016 that Sassou Nguesso would be the party's presidential candidate. Aside from the PCT, various other parties pledged to support Sassou Nguesso, including the Congolese Movement for Democracy and Integral Development (MCDDI), the Action and Renewal Movement (MAR), Citizen Rally (RC), the Union of Democratic Forces (UDF), the Rally for Democracy and Social Progress (RDPS), the Republican Dynamic for Development (DRD), and the Club 2002–Party for the Unity of the Republic.

In late January 2016, the main opposition party, the Pan-African Union for Social Democracy (UPADS), designated its leader, Pascal Tsaty Mabiala, as its presidential candidate.

André Okombi Salissa, the President of the Initiative for Democracy in Congo, announced on 30 January 2016 that he planned to stand as a presidential candidate. Okombi Salissa was a long-time member of the PCT and minister in Sassou Nguesso's government, but he increasingly became a critical and dissenting voice within the PCT after his dismissal from the government in 2012.

General Jean-Marie Mokoko, the Special Representative of the African Union Commission in the Central African Republic, stated on 8 February 2016 that he planned to stand as a presidential candidate. Mokoko headed the military from 1987 to 1993, and he was Adviser to the President for Peace and Security from 2005 until resigning on 3 February 2016. In the days after Mokoko announced his candidacy, a video from the early 2000s that indicated his involvement in a coup plot surfaced on the Internet. Mokoko said that the video was faked. On 19 February, orders were issued for Mokoko's arrest, and police reportedly blocked the roads near his home. He was questioned and then released on 21 February.

On 22 February 2016, 10 prospective presidential candidacies were submitted to the Constitutional Court for approval: Denis Sassou Nguesso, Anguios Nganguia-Engambé, Pascal Tsaty Mabiala, Jean-Marie Michel Mokoko, André Okombi Salissa, Guy Brice Parfait Kolelas, Claudine Munari, Joseph Kignoumbi Kia Mboungou, Joseph Mboussi Ngouari, and Louis Parfait Tchignamba Mavoungou. The Constitutional Court announced on 24 February that nine of the candidates were cleared to run. One minor candidate, Tchignamba Mavoungou, was barred from running for failing to pay the necessary amount as a deposit.

== Campaign ==
The official campaign period began on 4 March. Sassou Nguesso, campaigning in Pointe-Noire, discussed his economic development plans and vowed to win the vote with a majority in the first round. Meanwhile, Mokoko called for the vote to be delayed, complaining that the electoral register was inadequate and that the electoral commission was not truly independent.

While campaigning, Sassou Nguesso stressed that as President, he had maintained peace and facilitated economic growth and the building of infrastructure. Calling on the people to give him a first round majority, he promised more jobs and continued improvements to infrastructure. The opposition candidates focused on raising doubts about the credibility of the electoral commission and claiming that the government was preparing to rig the election.

== Conduct ==
The government invited foreign observers to monitor the elections. Observers are governed under a 2007 decree that sets out rules around election observation, which states that foreign and domestic observers – who can represent either international organisations or NGOs – have the complete and unfettered right to travel anywhere in the country, to communicate freely with all parties and social groupings, access voter registers, access polling stations and observe the behaviour of officials and representatives of candidates at polling stations. Observers from abroad are accredited by the Foreign Ministry. Previous election observation missions include those carried out by the African Union, the Francophonie and European Commission.

On election day the authorities banned the use of motor vehicles, and also cut internet and cell phone service.

== Results ==
The first round was held on 20 March 2016. Casting his vote in Brazzaville, Sassou Nguesso said that the election "marks progress for our democracy. And I can say that the new republic is setting out under a good omen".

Partial results, accounting for 72 out of 111 districts, were announced by the electoral commission on 22 March, showing Sassou Nguesso far ahead of his rivals with 67% of the vote. Guy Brice Parfait Kolelas, in second place, was credited with 16.8%. The opposition said that these results were "totally detached from the reality on the ground", vowing to go forward with plans to release a different set of results, which it had collected and claimed was more accurate. As the electoral commission was the only body authorized to release election results, the government continued blocking Internet and telephone communications in order to prevent the release of unauthorized results that it said could cause instability. Supporters of Sassou Nguesso in northern Brazzaville celebrated the President's apparent victory, while security forces were out to prevent any disturbances from opposition supporters in southern Brazzaville.

Minister of the Interior Raymond Mboulou announced the full results in the early hours of 24 March. These results showed Sassou Nguesso winning re-election with 60% of the vote, while opposition candidates Kolelas and Mokoko trailed distantly with 15% and 14% of the vote respectively. Communications were then restored. The opposition refused to accept the results, claiming that they were fraudulent. Meanwhile, Sassou Nguesso declared that the outcome represented "the real will of the people" and vowed that he would "always be at the side of the people".

Candidate	Party	Votes	%
Denis Sassou Nguesso	Congolese Party of Labour	838,922	60.19
Guy Brice Parfait Kolélas	Congolese Movement for Democracy and Integral Development	209,632	15.04
Jean-Marie Mokoko	Independent	191,562	13.74
Pascal Tsaty Mabiala	Pan-African Union for Social Democracy	65,025	4.67
André Okombi Salissa	Initiative for Democracy in Congo	57,373	4.12
Claudine Munari	Movement for Unity, Solidarity and Labour	21,530	1.54
Joseph Kignoumbi Kia Mboungou	Chain	3,540	0.25
Michel Mboussi Ngouari	Convention of Republican Parties	3,301	0.24
Anguios Nganguia Engabé	Party for Action of the Republic	2,905	0.21
Total		1,393,790	100.00
Valid votes		1,393,790	93.55
Invalid/blank votes		96,171	6.45
Total votes		1,489,961	100.00
Registered voters/turnout		2,161,839	68.92
Source: Constitutional Court

== Reactions ==
- United States: The United States State Department declared that they were "profoundly disappointed" with the electoral process and cited various human rights violations that occurred against opposition supporters. Furthermore, the department also criticized the intentional irregularities in the electoral process.
- European Union: The EU initially refused to send observers, predicting that the election would not be transparent or fair. The EU commended the peaceful election process; however, they condemned the post-election violence and condemned how the government handled the situation and alleged human rights violations. The EU also condemned the various cases of intimidation and arrest of opposition members and journalists.
- African Union: Nkosazana Dlamini-Zuma, Chairperson of the African Union Commission, congratulated the people of the country for conducting peaceful elections on election day. However, the AU condemned the communication blackout and urged the government to re-establish telecommunication links to the general public.

== Aftermath ==
While the main opposition candidates denounced the outcome, Joseph Kignoumbi Kia Mboungou, a minor candidate, recognized Sassou Nguesso's victory on 24 March and congratulated him. Another minor candidate, Michel Mboussi Ngouari, also recognized Sassou Nguesso's victory and congratulated him on 25 March.

The opposition planned to announce its unauthorized version of the results at a press conference held at the UPADS headquarters in the Diata section of Brazzaville on 25 March, but the event was disrupted by police, who used tear gas against a crowd of opposition supporters and arrested several of them, and it was cancelled.

Gunfire and explosions erupted in southern Brazzaville in the early hours of 4 April, continuing for several hours and causing thousands of residents to flee the area. The army and police were attacked by fighters who reportedly set fire to police stations as well as the town hall of the Makelekele district. Later in the morning, the sounds of fighting died down and security forces seemed to have reasserted control. The government called for calm and said that people should "return to their usual business". It said that the violence was perpetrated by former members of the "Ninja" militia, a rebel group from the late 1990s and early 2000s that had long since been disbanded. Frédéric Bintsamou, the erstwhile leader of the group, had declared his support for Guy Brice Parfait Kolelas in the presidential election. The government said that "investigations are ongoing" to determine whether any of the defeated opposition candidates were involved in orchestrating the violence.

Meanwhile, the Constitutional Court validated the results on 4 April, formally confirming Sassou Nguesso's re-election. The final results released by the Constitutional Court varied only slightly from the provisional results, showing Sassou Nguesso with 60.19% of the vote, Kolelas with 15.04%, and Mokoko with 13.74%; turnout was placed at 68.92%.

The government stated on 5 April that Bintsamou was believed to have been involved in the attacks of the previous day. It also said that 12 of the fighters were killed and about 50 were captured, while the security forces suffered three dead and six were injured; two civilians were also said to have died.

Kolelas said on 6 April that he accepted the decision of the Constitutional Court validating Sassou Nguesso's re-election, although he maintained that it was "questionable". He urged Sassou Nguesso "to be humble in victory because this election has been marred by all sorts of irregularities".

Sassou Nguesso was sworn in as President at a ceremony in Brazzaville on 16 April 2016. He appointed Clément Mouamba, who had once been a leading member of UPADS, as Prime Minister on 23 April. Mouamba, who served as Minister of Finance in the early 1990s, broke with his party in the period preceding the 2015 constitutional referendum, choosing to take part in a government-sponsored dialogue, which the opposition boycotted, on the question of changing the constitution.
