= Mouyondzi Airport =

- IATA: MUY; ICAO: FCBM

Summary
- Airport type: Closed
- Serves: Mouyondzi, Republic of the Congo
- Elevation AMSL: 1,670 ft / 509 m
- Coordinates: 4°00′53″S 13°57′59″E

Map
- Location of airport in the Republic of the Congo

Runways
Direction	Length		Surface
Direction	m	ft	Surface
Closed
- Source: Great Circle Mapper

Mouyondzi Airport (IATA: MUY, ICAO: FCBM) was an airstrip 5 kilometres (3.1 mi) east of the town of Mouyondzi, in the Bouenza Department of the Republic of the Congo. The land is now under cultivation.
