= Convention for Democracy and Salvation =

The Convention for Democracy and Salvation (French: Convention pour la Démocratie et le Salut, abbrev. CODESA) is an alliance of political parties in the Republic of the Congo; its formation by sixteen opposition parties was announced on 29 March 2002. Led by the former Prime Minister André Milongo, the party hopes "to offer the people a clear choice between inexorable decline and national renaissance." The convention includes the Union for Democracy and the Republic (UDR-Mwinda, led by Milongo), the Rally for Democracy and Development, the Union for Democracy and Social Progress, the National Convention for Democracy and Development, the Congolese Party for Renewal, and the National Convention for the Republic and Solidarity.
