= Union for the Reconstruction and Development of Congo =

Political party in the Republic of the Congo

Union for the Reconstruction and Development of Congo Union pour la reconstruction et le développement du Congo
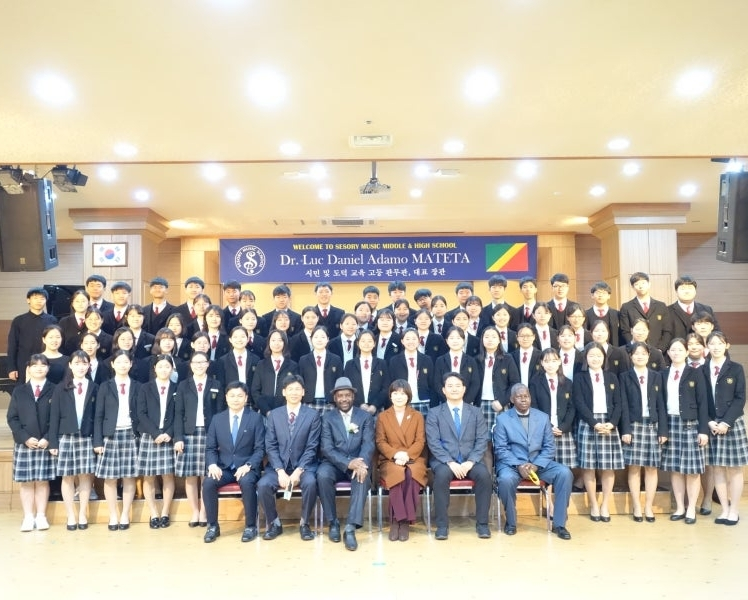
- Abbreviation: URDC
- President: Luc Adamo Mateta
- Founded: 25 January 2002
- Headquarters: Brazzaville
- Ideology: Christian democracy Patriotism
- Political position: Centre
- Colors: Blue
- National Assembly: 1 / 151

The Union for the Reconstruction and Development of Congo (URDC) is a political party in the Republic of the Congo, founded in 2002 by Luc Daniel Adamo Mateta, who serves as its founding president. It is a centrist Christian party.

== History and Background ==
The URDC was established to actively participate in Congolese political life and promote governance based on moral and ethical values. The party positions itself as centrist, seeking to occupy a space between the presidential majority and the opposition.

== Ideology and Objectives ==
- Centrist ideology: pragmatic and moderate, aiming to unite Congolese society.
- Christian and moral values: emphasizing patriotism, justice, fairness, and integrity.
- Political goals: promoting civic awareness, national development, peaceful cooperation, and informed political engagement.

== Alliances and Activities ==
- The URDC is a member of the Rassemblement des partis du centre (RPC), a coalition of centrist parties in the Republic of the Congo.
- Luc Adamo Mateta has held coordinating roles within the coalition to strengthen cooperation among centrist parties.

== Electoral history ==
- 2022 Republic of the Congo parliamentary election: 1 seat

== See also ==
- List of political parties in the Republic of the Congo
