= Claudine Munari =

Congolese politician (born 1954)

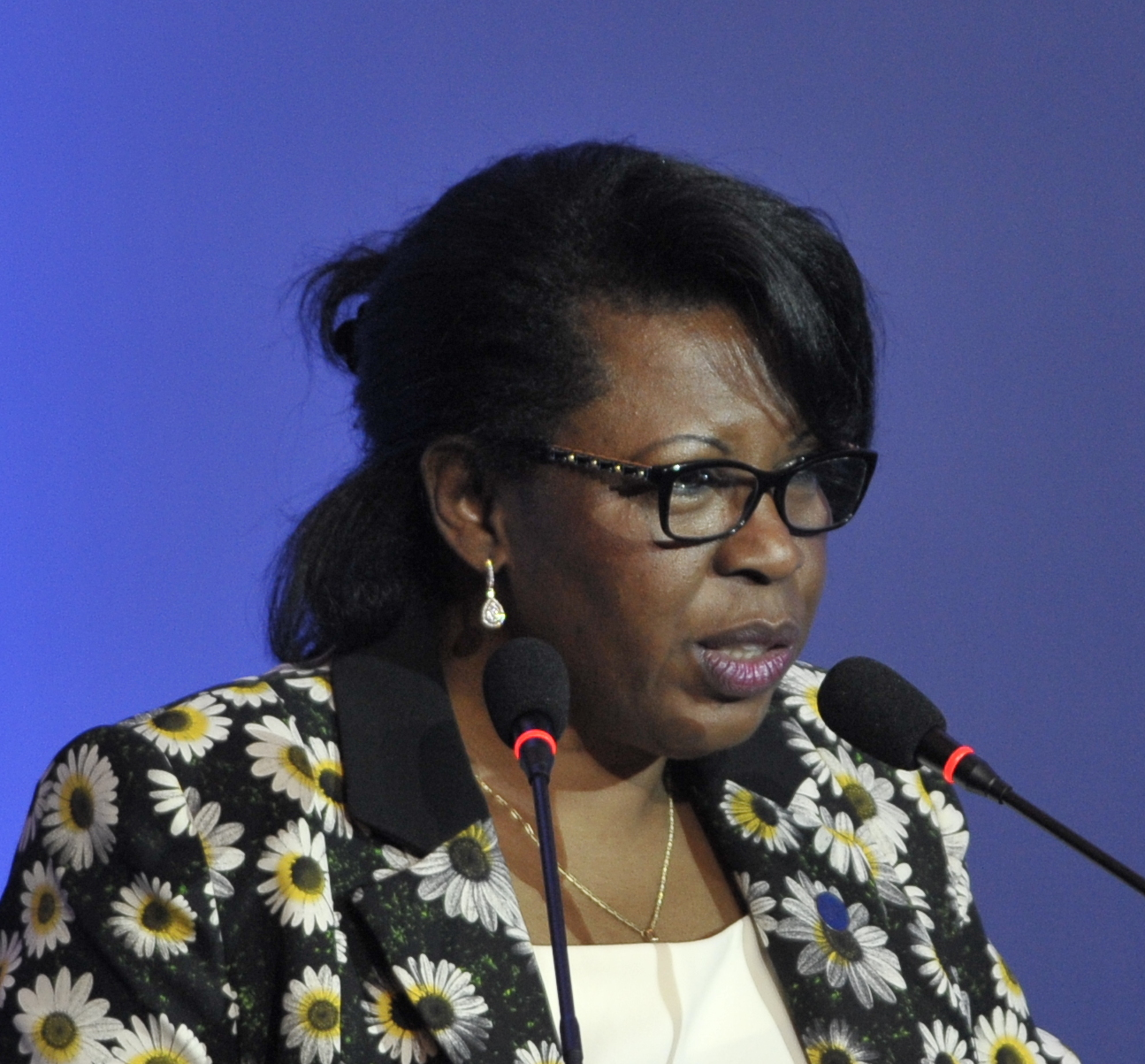
- Claudine Munari at a WTO conference in Bali, December 2013

Minister of Trade
- In office 2009–2015

Personal details
- Born: 1954 (age 71–72) Pointe-Noire, Congo-Brazzaville
- Party: Movement for Unity, Solidarity and Labour

Claudine Munari Mabondzo (born 1954) is a Congolese politician. She was Director of the Cabinet of President Pascal Lissouba from 1992 to 1997. Although Munari fled into exile when Lissouba was ousted, she later returned to politics in Congo-Brazzaville; she was a Deputy in the National Assembly from 2002 to 2009 and was also the Second Secretary of the National Assembly from 2007 to 2009. From 2009 to 2015, she served in the government as Minister of Trade.

== Background and early career ==
Munari was born in Pointe-Noire, Congo-Brazzaville's second city and main port. She obtained a degree in econometrics and worked at Citroën, an automobile manufacturer in France, from 1976 to 1981. Subsequently she returned to Congo and was the Administrative and Financial Director of CIATA, a French consultancy firm, from 1982 to 1991.

== 1990s political career, exile, and 2001 corruption trial ==
Munari met Pascal Lissouba at the 1991 Sovereign National Conference, and soon afterward Lissouba appointed her to a leading position in his newly created political party, the Pan-African Union for Social Democracy (UPADS), as Assistant for Finance and Material. After Lissouba won the August 1992 presidential election, he appointed her as Director of the Cabinet of the President. In that post, Munari held the rank of Minister. She additionally became the Mayor of Mouyondzi in 1996.

An advocate for women, Munari promoted the cause of increasing women's participation in the decision-making of society, and she founded the Femme 2000 association, a non-governmental organization working for improvement of the socioeconomic status of women, on 24 March 1993.

Munari remained in her post as Director of the President's Cabinet for five years. When Lissouba was ousted at the end of the June–October 1997 civil war, Munari—like Lissouba—went into exile, living in France. She was included in the Patriotic Front for Dialogue and National Reconciliation (FPDRN), a moderate exile group created in France in October 2000; the group favored peace and reconciliation, choosing not to challenge the legitimacy of President Denis Sassou Nguesso, who had toppled Lissouba. Munari returned to Congo-Brazzaville as part of a FPDRN delegation to participate in the March–April 2001 inclusive national dialogue.

Munari testified at the trial of Lissouba and some of his ministers in absentia in December 2001. At the trial, it was said that the 150 million dollars paid by Occidental Petroleum as part of an allegedly corrupt 1993 oil deal with Lissouba's government was paid into Munari's personal bank account. According to Munari, the money was used to cover costs associated with the 1993 parliamentary election and to pay salary arrears to civil servants. Munari herself also initially faced charges during the trial, but they were dismissed on 27 December 2001 on the grounds that she had merely followed Lissouba's orders.

== Political career since 2002 ==
In the May–June 2002 parliamentary election, she was elected to the National Assembly as an independent candidate in Mouyondzi constituency, located in Bouenza Region; she won the seat in the first round with 72.55% of the vote. She also became Vice-President of the Congo-France Friendship Group.

In the June–August 2007 parliamentary election, Munari was re-elected to the National Assembly from Mouyondzi constituency as an independent candidate. She received 30.80% in the first round and then prevailed in the second round. Following that election, Munari—who had joined the presidential majority—was elected as Second Secretary of the National Assembly on 4 September 2007; receiving 121 votes from the 129 deputies who were present.

In the National Assembly, Munari focused on cooperation with the Inter-Parliamentary Union (IPU) and the Network of Female Parliamentarians of Africa. Munari also founded a political party, the Movement for Unity, Solidarity, and Work (MUST), and serves as its President.

Munari supported Sassou Nguesso's candidacy in the July 2009 presidential election. When the National Initiative for Peace (INP)—an organization designed to support Sassou Nguesso's re-election bid while emphasizing the importance of peace—was launched on 28 February 2009, Munari was included on the INP's 91-member National Coordination.

=== Minister of Trade ===
Munari was appointed to the government as Minister of Trade and Supplies by President Sassou Nguesso on 15 September 2009. She met with Jeanne Dambendzet, her predecessor as Minister of Trade, on 24 September to discuss issues facing the ministry, including Economic Partnership Agreements with the European Union and internal trade issues, such as rising food prices. Munari said that she would continue to consult with Dambendzet when needed.

Having been appointed to the government, it was necessary for Munari to leave the National Assembly. On 22 December 2009, Joseph Kignoumbi Kia Mboungou officially succeeded her as Second Secretary of the National Assembly. On that occasion, Munari stressed to Kignoumbi Kia Mboungou the importance of continuing to work with the IPU and the Network of Female Parliamentarians of Africa. She joked that she was "not asking [him] to wear a skirt" but expressed confidence that the network would listen to him.

In the July–August 2012 parliamentary election, she was re-elected to the National Assembly as a candidate in Mouyondzi constituency. She won the seat in the second round of voting, receiving 60.02% of the vote.

Munari came out in opposition to changing the constitution to allow Sassou Nguesso to run for another term and participated in an opposition dialogue, which was held to express objections to constitutional change, in July 2015. Apparently as a consequence, she was dismissed from the government on 10 August 2015.
