= Luc Adamo Matéta =

Congolese politician, URDC leader and RPC head

Minister Delegate to the Presidency of the Republic of Congo
- High Commissioner
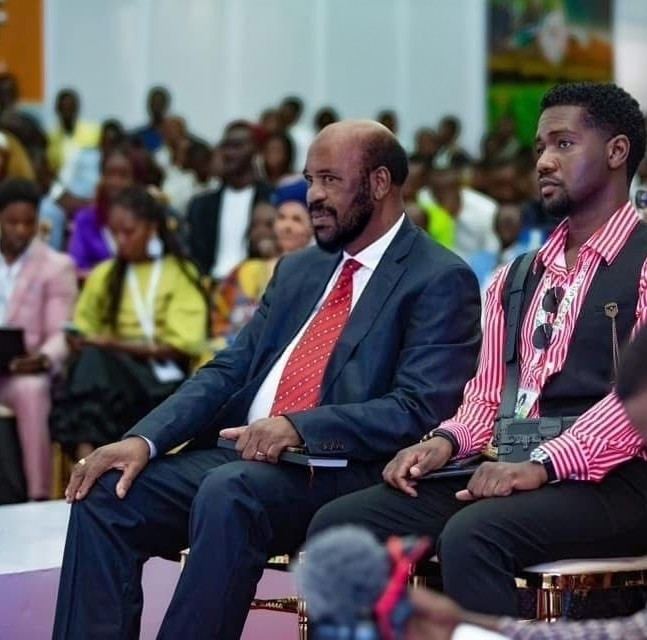
- Luc and Daniel Mateta at the Palace of Parliament in Brazzaville, on March 29, 2024.
- Born: October 30, 1949 (age 77); Kintamba, Bouenza
- Citizenship: Congolese
- Education: Doctor of Economics - Moscow University (RUSSIA)
- Occupation: Statistical engineer
- Height: 185 m (606 ft 11 in)
- Political party: Union for the Reconstruction and Development of Congo (URDC)
- Other political affiliations: General Coordinator of the Rally of Centrist Parties (RPC)

Luc Daniel Adamo Matéta is a statesman, economist, and statistician from the Republic of the Congo, born on October 30, 1949, in Kintamba, Bouenza Department, to a father from the Democratic Republic of the Congo and a mother from Brazzaville.

Holding a degree in statistical engineering, he earned his PhD in economics from Lomonosov Moscow State University, graduating at the top of his class. World-renowned, this institution counts several Nobel laureates among its alumni.

He began his career as a specialist in economic and statistical matters before being appointed in 1982 as the first Director General of the Industries of Congo.

By presidential decree of 23 January 1995, Luc Adamo Mateta was appointed Minister delegate of the Budget and the Coordination of Financial Administration. In July 1995, he became Vice-President of the Committee for the Privatization of Public Enterprises.

In 1997, he was appointed Minister of the Budget of Congo. Since 2002, he has served as Minister Delegate to the Presidency of the Republic of the Congo, with the rank of High Commissioner, within the cabinet of President Denis Sassou Nguesso.

He is the President of URDC, the Union for the Reconstruction and Development of the Congo, a political party that he founded and leads.

Matéta also serves as General Coordinator of the Rally of Centrist Parties (RPC) in the Republic of the Congo, a political platform that brings together several centrist parties and promotes pragmatism, political realism and patriotism.

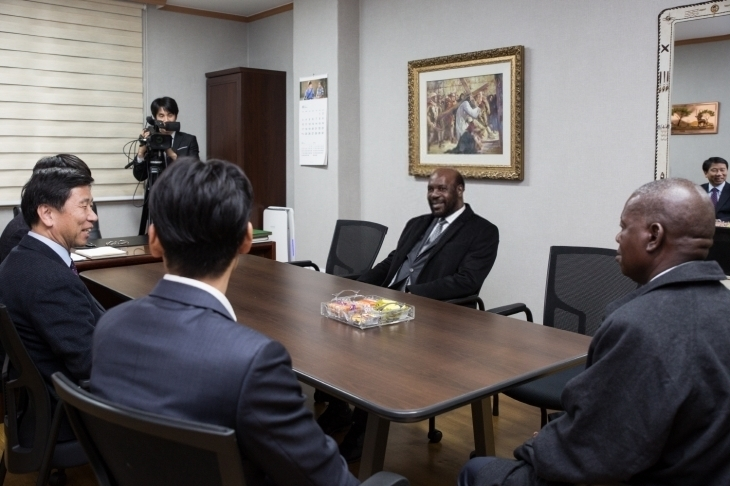
Mr. Luc Daniel Mateta held a working session with the authorities of the Republic of Korea in Seoul.

He is a member of the National Prayer Breakfast, an annual event in Washington D.C. held at the White House that is attended by the President of the United States, members of the U.S. Congress, diplomats, foreign leaders, and public figures.

Matéta was a candidate in the 2002 presidential election and a member of parliament for the MCDDI political party of former Prime Minister Bernard Kolélas in 1992.

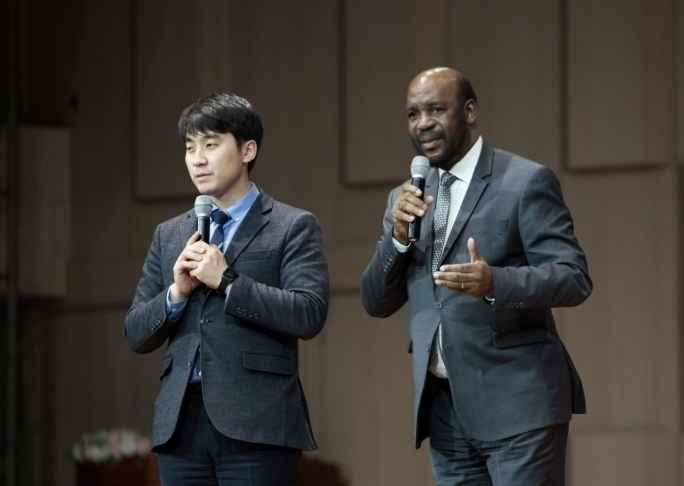
On the occasion of his visit to Japan, Mr. Luc Adamo Mateta delivered a speech focused on strengthening cooperation and promoting dialogue.

He is one of the rare political figures to have collaborated with the country's four historical leaders: Yhombi-Opango, Kolelas, Lissouba, and Sassou Nguesso.

Matéta is multilingual, he speaks French, Russian, English, Lingala and Kintumba.

In 2007, he succeeded Antoinette Sassou Nguesso, the First Lady of the Republic of the Congo, as president of the National Coordination Committee (CCN) for projects funded by the Global Fund to Fight AIDS, Tuberculosis and Malaria.

In 2018, an avenue located in front of the Lycée Français Saint-Exupéry in Brazzaville, in the district of Bacongo, was named in his honor: Rue Adamo Mateta.

Luc Adamo Mateta is also a major landowner in the Republic of the Congo. He operates an agricultural estate of more than 1,638 hectares located in Nkayi, in the Bouenza region, covering approximately 16 km² an area about eight times larger than the city of Monaco. This estate, inherited from his family, includes crop cultivation, cattle farming, fish farming, as well as a slaughterhouse and a food processing unit.

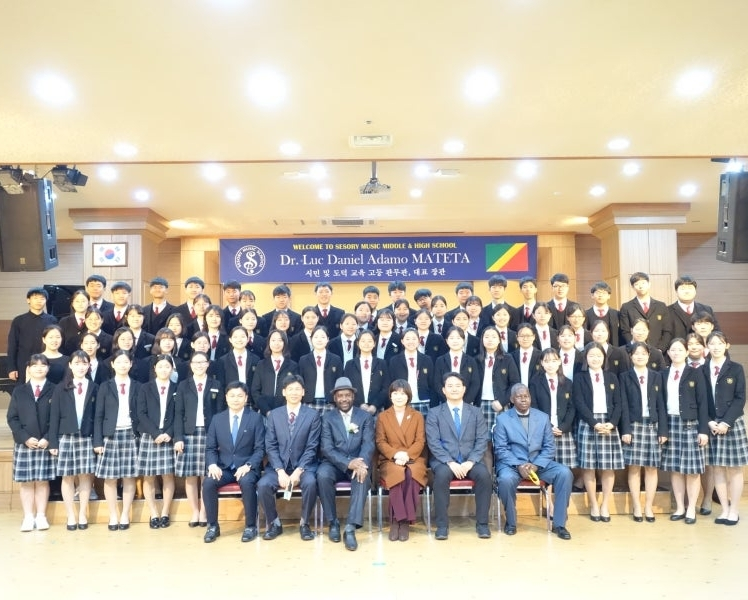
Mr. Luc Daniel Mateta visited a university in Seoul, where he held discussions with members of the academic community.

== Political career ==
Born in Kitamba in October 1949, Matéta studied in the Soviet Union. He worked at the statistics department of the Ministry of the Economy and Finance, and was an early member of the Congolese Movement for Democracy and Integral Development (MCDDI), led by Bernard Kolélas. In the 1992 parliamentary election, he was elected to the National Assembly as an MCDDI candidate in the Pool Region. After Kolélas reached an agreement with President Pascal Lissouba, Matéta was one of the four members of the opposition who were appointed to the government on 23 January 1995; he was named Minister-Delegate for the Budget and the Coordination of Financial Administration.

In the midst of the 1997 civil war, Kolélas was appointed as Prime Minister in September 1997 and a national unity government was formed; Matéta was retained in that government and promoted to the post of Minister of the Budget and the Coordination of Financial Administration. The Kolélas government survived for only one month, however; rebels loyal to Denis Sassou Nguesso captured Brazzaville in mid-October 1997. Matéta went into exile with his family in Côte d’Ivoire, where he was granted political refugee status by President Henri Konan Bédié.

After the 1997 civil war, as fighting continued between the government of President Sassou Nguesso and "Ninja" rebels, Matéta returned to Congo-Brazzaville in 1998 and renounced armed struggle in 1999. Also in 1999, he became a member of the bureau of the Coordination Committee for the Monitoring of the Cease-Fire Agreement and was assigned responsibility for finances. Later, Matéta was appointed as the Commissioner for Project Implementation at the High Commission for the Reintegration of Former Combatants in August 2001.

Matéta left the MCDDI and created a new political party, the Union for the Reconstruction and Development of Congo (URDC); it was founded on 25 January 2002, and Matéta led the party as its president. He stood in the 10 March 2002 presidential election as the candidate of the Convention for Democracy and the Republic, receiving 1.59% of the vote and placing fifth. Following the election, he visited President Sassou Nguesso on 18 March and congratulated Sassou Nguesso on his victory.

Matéta stood as a URDC candidate in Mfilou, the seventh arrondissement of Brazzaville, in the May–June 2002 parliamentary election, He was then appointed as High Commissioner for Civic Instruction and Moral Education on 11 October 2002.

In December 2006, a book written by Matéta, Reflections for a New Africa (Réflexions pour une Afrique nouvelle), was published.

Together with the General Movement for the Reconstruction of Congo, led by Jean-Michel Bokamba-Yangouma, Matéta's URDC formed the Coalition of Center Parties (CPC) in April 2008. Initially, Bokamba-Yangouma was President of the CPC and Matéta was its vice-president; later, Matéta and Bokamba-Yangouma served as co-presidents of the CPC. As a centrist party, the URDC is not part of the opposition but is also not part of the Presidential Majority, despite Matéta's official post. It likens its views to Christian democracy.

As High Commissioner for Civic Instruction and Moral Education, Matéta gave a talk on citizenship in the context of elections on 9 June 2009, shortly before the July 2009 presidential election. He noted the importance of exercising one's right to vote, behaving peacefully and responsibly while voting, and waiting for the announcement of results in a disciplined manner. While some opposition groups planned to boycott the election, Matéta stressed that participating in the election was a crucial civic responsibility: "abstention is an act of insubordination to the laws of the Republic, that is to say insubordination to democracy and the sovereignty of the people. Such behavior is antisocial: it denies the foundations of society and leads to chaos."

Matéta presented the second edition of the Congolese Citizen's Guide, a book intended as a guide for the different aspects of citizenship and civic life, to the press on 21 May 2010. He said that the guide was his office's contribution to the 50th anniversary of Congolese independence. Mateta is of Christian faith, and he is close to the Protestant church of Brazzaville.
