= Mouyondzi =

- Location in the Republic of the Congo
- Coordinates: 3°59′44″S 13°55′19″E
- Country: Republic of the Congo
- Department: Bouenza
- District: Mouyondzi

Population (2023 census)
  - Total: 21,215

Mouyondzi (can also be written as Muyonzi or Muyondzi) is a town and the seat of Mouyondzi District in the Bouenza Department of Congo-Brazzaville. Mouyondzi's population mostly consists of Beembe.

The town is served by Mouyondzi Airport.

== Climate ==
Climate data for Mouyondzi (1991-2020)
Month	Jan	Feb	Mar	Apr	May	Jun	Jul	Aug	Sep	Oct	Nov	Dec	Year
Daily mean °C (°F)	24.4 (75.9)	24.5 (76.1)	24.9 (76.8)	24.9 (76.8)	24.3 (75.7)	22.2 (72.0)	21.3 (70.3)	22.0 (71.6)	23.2 (73.8)	24.1 (75.4)	24.0 (75.2)	23.9 (75.0)	23.6 (74.6)
Average precipitation mm (inches)	164.7 (6.48)	225.7 (8.89)	182.1 (7.17)	209.1 (8.23)	147.7 (5.81)	7.6 (0.30)	5.2 (0.20)	10.2 (0.40)	32.5 (1.28)	165.2 (6.50)	245.4 (9.66)	203.9 (8.03)	1,599.3 (62.95)
Source: NOAA
