= Dynamic for the Republic and Recovery =

Political party in the Republic of the Congo

Dynamic for the Republic and Recovery Dynamique pour la République et le Développement
- Abbreviation: DRD
- President: Hellot Matson Mampouya
- Founder: Hellot Matson Mampouya
- Founded: 18 May 2013
- Colors: Gold
- National Assembly: 2 / 151

The Dynamic for the Republic and Recovery (DRD; French: Dynamique pour la République et le Développement) is a political party in the Republic of the Congo.

== History ==
Hellot Matson Mampouya announced the creation of his new party, the Dynamic for the Republic and Recovery on 18 May 2013.

== Electoral history ==
- 2022 Republic of the Congo parliamentary election: 2 seats

== See also ==
- Politics of the Republic of the Congo
