= Joseph Kignoumbi Kia Mboungou =

Congolese politician

Joseph Kignomba Kia Mbougou is a Congolese politician. He stood in the 2002 presidential election for the Pan-African Union for Social Democracy. He placed a distant second in the election, receiving 33,154 votes.

== Biography ==
Kignoumbi Kia Mboungou succeeded Claudine Munari as Second Secretary of the National Assembly on 22 December 2009.

In the July 2017 parliamentary election, he stood for re-election to the National Assembly as the La Chaine candidate in the constituency for the sub-prefecture of Sibiti. He placed first, with 44% of the vote, in the first round of voting, followed by an independent candidate, Jean-Favien Mabiala, who received 33.5%. He won the seat in the second round of voting. On 19 August 2017, when the National Assembly began meeting for its new term, he was re-elected as Second Secretary of the National Assembly. He was the sole candidate for the post, which was the only spot on the Bureau of the National Assembly that was reserved for the opposition, and received 142 votes from the deputies present.

In December 2024 he stated the country was in ruins, criticizing the financial crisis brought on by the government and the youth policy, where they could not obtain employment. He proposed cutting down the number of government members and doing audits and having a clearer judicial system. On 7 January 2025 he was impeached from the position of Second Secretary of the National Assembly and replaced by Alain Pascal Leyinda. This was largely attributed to his December 2024 speech criticizing the government and for boycotting the closing ceremony of the administrative and budgetary session.
