= Movement for Democracy and Progress (Republic of the Congo) =

Political party in the Republic of the Congo

The Movement for Democracy and Progress (French: Mouvement pour la démocratie et le progrès, MDP) is a political party in the Republic of the Congo, led by Jean-Claude Ibovi. In the parliamentary election held on June 24 and August 5, 2007, the party won one out of 137 seats. It supports the government of President Denis Sassou Nguesso.

Originally an organization called the National Convention for the Defense and Promotion of Denis Sassou Nguesso's Ideas (CNDPID), it was subsequently transformed into a new political party, the Movement for Democracy and Progress (MDP), which was officially launched on 18 February 2007 under Ibovi's leadership.

Ibovi was the only MDP candidate to obtain a seat in the National Assembly in the 2007 election.
