= National Assembly (Republic of the Congo) =

Lower house of the parliament of the Republic of the Congo

National Assembly Assemblée nationale

Type
- Type: Lower house of the Parliament

History
- Founded: 1958; 67 years ago

Leadership
- President: Isidore Mvouba, PCT since 19 August 2017
- First Vice President: Léon-Alfred Opimbat, PCT since 19 August 2017
- Second Vice President: Roland Bouiti-Viaudo, MAR since 19 August 2017

Structure
- Seats: 151 members
- Political groups: Government (120): PCT (112); MAR (4); Club 2002 (2); RDPS (2); Support (3): CPR (1); URDP (1); RC (1); Opposition (16): UPADS (7); UDH-Yuki (7); MUST (1); MCDDI (1); Others (12): PRL (2); DRD (2); APC (1); MDP (1); Independents (6)
- Length of term: 5 years

Elections
- Voting system: Two-round system
- Last election: 10 and 31 July 2022
- Next election: 2027

Meeting place
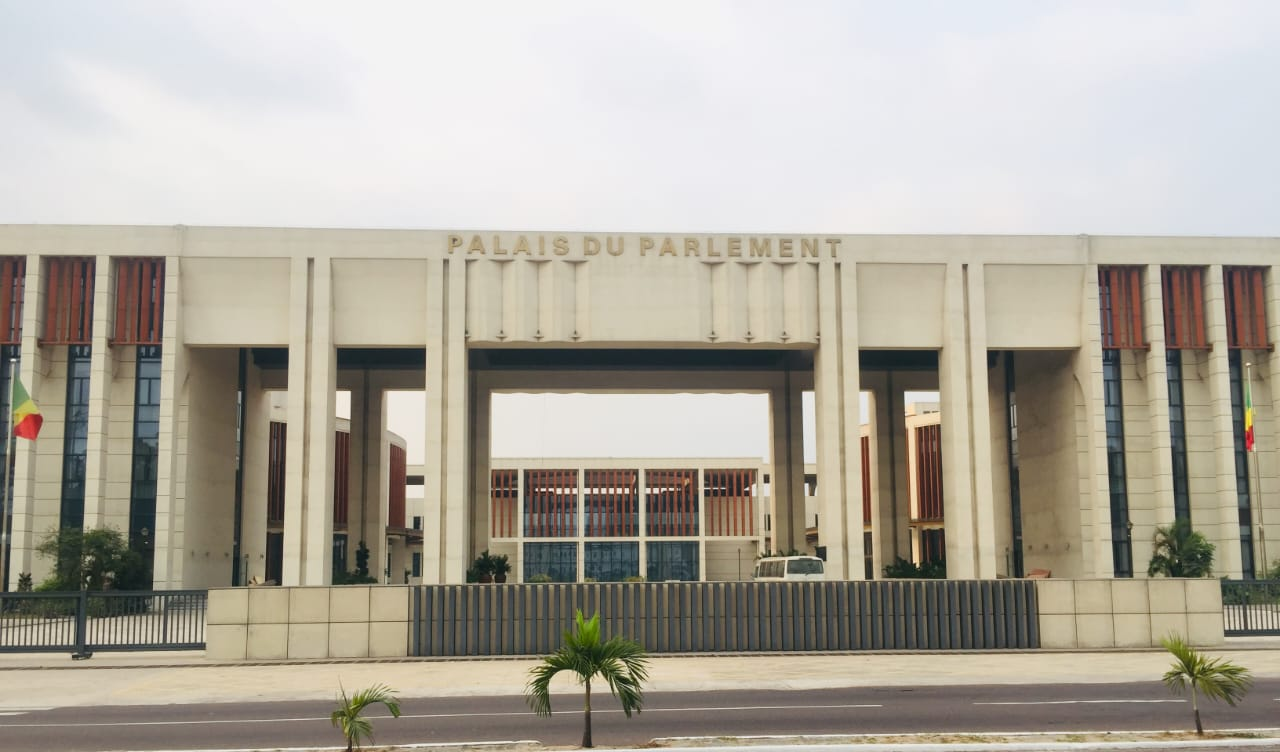
- Brazzaville

Website
- www.assemblee-nationale.cg

Constitution
- Constitution of the Republic of the Congo

The National Assembly (French: Assemblée nationale) is the lower house of the bicameral Parliament of the Republic of the Congo. It has 151 members, elected for five-year terms in single-seat constituencies.

== Colonial elections ==
- 1946–47
- 1952
- 1957

== Post-colonial elections ==
- 1959
- 1963
- 1973
- 1979
- 1984
- 1989
- 1992
- 1993
- 2002
- 2007
- 2012
- 2017
- 2022

== See also ==
- List of presidents of the National Assembly of the Republic of the Congo
- Pierre Passi
