= Refugees in Cameroon =

As of 31 August 2020, Cameroon hosted a total refugee population of approximately 421,700. Of these, 280,500 were from the Central African Republic, driven by war and insecurity. In the Far North Region, Cameroon hosts 114,300 Nigerian refugees, with the population sharing their already scarce resources with the refugees.

In comparison, in 2017, Cameroon hosted a total population of refugees and asylum seekers of approximately 97,400. Of these, 49,300 were from the Central African Republic, 41,600 from Chad, and 2,900 from Nigeria. Kidnappings of Cameroonian citizens by Central African bandits have increased since 2005. The increase is explained by the worsening situation in both neighbouring countries that result in further displacement.

Between 2004 and 2013, 92,000 refugees from the Central African Republic fled to Cameroon "to escape rebel groups and bandits in the north of their country."

In 2014, Cameroon had an estimated 44,000 refugees from Nigeria. Internal Cameroonian refugees also began to leave areas bordering Nigeria to escape Boko Haram violence, especially following the December 2014 Cameroon clashes.

== Cameroonian internally displaced persons ==
In January 2015, many schools in the Far North Region did not re-open immediately after the Christmas vacation following the December 2014 Cameroon clashes, and it was reported that "thousands of teachers, students and pupils have fled schools located along the border due to bloody confrontations between the Cameroon military and suspected Boko Haram militants." The Cameroonian military has deployed forces to ensure safety for students attending schools.

== Nigerian refugees in Cameroon ==
As of 30 October 2013, IRIN reports:

"There are 8,128 Nigerian refugees in Cameroon's Far North Region, but only 5,289 are registered by UNHCR ...

Many of the Nigerians who have fled into Cameroon prefer to stay with friends and family near the border areas.

The refugee population fleeing from Boko Haram are scattered in very inaccessible localities in the north of Cameroon, and many who refuse to be registered and stay in camps are still at the mercy of the [Boko Haram] sect, and are seen as threat to local security," said UNHCR's Hamon.

Authorities fear the lack of registration could ease Boko Haram infiltration into the country.

Between May and July 2014, over 8,000 Nigerians from Adamawa, Yobe and Borno States fled to Cameroon. "Food and shelter for those in need have been provided by local communities. However, their food stocks are running low." Malnutrition was estimated at 25 percent, and the UN World Food Programme (WFP) has begun distributing food, despite a "volatile" security situation near the Nigerian border.

As of 11 November 2014, it was reported that "some 13,000 Nigerian refugees crossed from Adamawa state after insurgents attacked and captured the town of Mubi in late October. The refugees fled to the towns of Guider and Gashiga in the North region of Cameroon and to Bourha, Mogode and Boukoula in the Far North." However, the "vast majority" of these refugees returned to Nigeria, principally to the city of Yola.

As of March,2017 the number of Nigerian refugees in Cameroon has grown to 85,000.

=== Cameroonian Government forced return Nigerian Refugees ===
As of 21 March 2017 UNHCR reported the forceful return of Nigerian Refugees in Cameroon. In 2016, over 26,000 Nigerian refugees were forcefully returned by the Cameroonian government at different events. The action taking by the governments is in contrary to the obligations under international and regional refugee protection instruments.

== Refugees from the Central African Republic ==
As of 2012, refugees from the CAR were already living in the cities of Yaounde and Douala.

=== 2014 Cameroon Emergency ===
In the first months of 2014, thousands of refugees fleeing the violence in the Central African Republic arrived in Cameroon. A report summarizing the refugee crisis in Cameroon by the United Nations Regional Office for Central Africa was published in March 2014 (in French).

As of 6 June 2014, funding available for refugee assistance has been described as "meagre".

The UN Refugees Agency (UNHCR) says that only US$ 4.2 million of the $ 22.6 million it needs to assist those escaping violence in the Central African Republic (CAR) has been received, and just 12 percent of the $ 247 million requested by 15 aid groups to respond to the influx from CAR has been funded ...

"If we don't tackle this in a very urgent and coordinated way, I am afraid the crisis will be much bigger, especially when we all know that unfortunately the CAR crisis is not going to be fixed that soon," said Najat Rochdi, the UN resident coordinator for Cameroon.

On June 4, 2014, AlertNet reported:

Almost 90,000 people have fled to neighbouring Cameroon since December [2013] and up to 2,000 a week, mostly women and children, are still crossing the border, the United Nations said.

"Women and children are arriving in Cameroon in a shocking state, after weeks, sometimes months, on the road, foraging for food," said Ertharin Cousin, executive director of the World Food Programme (WFP).

As of 26 May 2014, UNHCR stated the number of new refugees was approximately 85,000, including 52,000 at borders.

On 1 July 2014, the World Food Programme announced that "a series of unexpected, temporary ration reductions has affected camps in several countries since early 2013 and into 2014", including Cameroon.

An assessment released 4 July 2014 indicated that "in Cameroon, up to 1 out of 3 refugee children from Central African Republic suffer from malnutrition ... The risk of severe acute malnutrition, which can be deadly if left untreated, is particularly high. In the inpatient center of Batouri close to the border, the mortality rate in May exceeded 24 per cent."

== List of refugee centers ==
A unit has been opened for treating malnutrition at Batouri Hospital in Batouri. As of May 23, 2014, 100 refugee children were being treated for severe malnutrition in Batouri Hospital's nutrition centre. The hospital also treats people arriving with machete wounds.

By 2014, refugee centers had opened in more rural areas:

(as of 26 May 2014)

- Borgop – 7,500 people, capacity of 10,000
- Gado Badzere – 9,103 people, capacity of 10,000
- Lolo – 10,040 people, capacity of 10,000
- Mbilé – 4,150 people, capacity of 10,000
- Timangolo – 0 people, capacity of 5,000
- Yokadouma – 227 people, capacity of 2,000

== List of entry points ==
(as of 26 May 2014)

- Adamoua Region (12 entry points) – 8,960 people
- Garoua-Boulaï – 4,390 people
- Gbiti – 21,451 people
- Kentzou – 11,971 people
- East Region (10 other entry points) – 8,759 people

In April 2014, a spokesperson for UNHCR stated:

With the main entry points at Garoua Boulai and Kentzou no longer accessible due to anti-Balaka activities, people are using alternative routes. "This has caused the number of entry points into Cameroon to grow from 12 to 27 over last three weeks, making it more challenging for our colleagues to monitor the border."
