= René-Dambert Ndouane =

Congolese politician

René-Dambert Ndouane is a Congolese politician who served in the government of Congo-Brazzaville as Minister of Tourism from 1997 to 1999 and as Minister of Labour from 1999 to 2002. He was Second Vice-President of the National Assembly from 2002 to 2007 and First Vice-President of the National Assembly from 2012 to 2017.

== Political career ==
After Denis Sassou Nguesso returned to power at the conclusion of the June–October 1997 civil war, he appointed Ndouane to the government as Minister of Tourism and the Environment on 2 November 1997. Ndouane was moved to the post of Minister of Labour and Social Security on 12 January 1999. He opened a regional directorate of the Civil Servant Retirement Fund at Ouesso on 31 May 2000.

In the May–June 2002 parliamentary election, Ndouane was elected to the National Assembly as the candidate of the Congolese Labour Party (PCT) in Sembé constituency, located in Sangha Region; he won the seat in the first round, receiving 54.41% of the vote. When the National Assembly began meeting, Ndouane was elected as Second Vice-President of the National Assembly on 10 August 2002; André Okombi Salissa was appointed to replace him as Minister of Labour on 18 August 2002. In the National Assembly, Ndouane was also assigned responsibility for handling inter-parliamentary relations with the African, Caribbean and Pacific Group of States and the European Union on 23 August 2002. He was succeeded by Okombi Salissa at the Ministry of Labour on 26 August 2002.

In the June–August 2007 parliamentary election, Ndouane stood for re-election as the PCT candidate in Sembé; he faced Norbert Constant Zaba, who was also a PCT member but stood in the election as an independent candidate. Ndouane placed first in the first round of voting, receiving 40.99% of the vote against 32.44% for Zaba; however, Zaba defeated Ndouane in the second round, receiving 55.70% of the vote. Some believed that the official result was fraudulent; Ndouane argued that the official result declared by the Ministry of Territorial Administration was based on incomplete and false information, and a report of the results given by an official at the Sangha electoral commission showed Ndouane as the winner, with 53.56% of the vote. Ndouane appealed to the Constitutional Court, but his appeal was rejected on 26 October 2007.

At the PCT's Sixth Extraordinary Congress, held in July 2011, Ndouane was elected to the PCT's 471-member Central Committee and designated as a member of the PCT's National Control and Evaluation Commission.

After five years out of the National Assembly, Ndouane stood again as the PCT's candidate for Sembé constituency in the July–August 2012 parliamentary election; he won the seat in the first round of voting, receiving 84.79% of the vote. On 5 September 2012, when the deputies met to choose the members of the National Assembly's bureau for the new parliamentary term, Ndouane was elected as First Vice-President of the National Assembly; he received 132 votes from the 138 deputies who voted.

Ndouane met with a delegation from the United Nations Development Programme on 2 August 2013 for a discussion about renewable energy. He met with the visiting Speaker of the Iranian Parliament, Ali Larijani, on 8 March 2014 to discuss cooperation between Congo-Brazzaville and Iran.

In the July 2017 parliamentary election, Ndouane stood for re-election as the PCT candidate in Sembe. He placed second, with 36% of the vote, in the first round of voting, behind PCAP candidate Joseph Bembi Membo, who received 40%. He won the seat in the second round of voting. Nevertheless, he did not receive a post in the Bureau of the National Assembly when the legislature began meeting for the new parliamentary term on 19 August 2017.
