= Liouesso Hydroelectric Power Station =

Power station in the Republic of the Congo

- Map of the Republic of the Congo showing the location of Liouesso. Liouesso Hydroelectric Power Station (Africa) Liouesso Hydroelectric Power Station (Earth)
- Country: Republic of the Congo
- Location: Ouesso, Sangha Region
- Coordinates: 01°26′07″N 16°10′42″E
- Purpose: Power
- Status: Operational
- Construction cost: US$110 million
- Owner: Government of the Republic of the Congo
- Operator: Energaz

Dam and spillways
- Impounds: Sangha River

Power Station
- Commission date: 2017
- Turbines: 3 x 6.4 MW
- Installed capacity: 19.2 megawatts (25,700 hp)
- Annual generation: 9 GWh

The Liouesso Hydroelectric Power Station is a 19.2 megawatts (25,700 hp) hydroelectric power station in the Republic of the Congo. The government-owned power station was commercially commissioned in May 2017. Constructed by the China Gezhouba Group, the renewable energy infrastructure project cost approximately US$110 million to construct.

== Location ==
The power station is located in the town of Ouesso, in Ouesso District, in the Sangha Region of the Republic of the Congo. Ouesso sits on the Sangha River, a tributary of the Congo River, near the international border with Cameroon. This is approximately 829 kilometres (515 mi), by road, north of Brazzaville, the capital and largest city in that country.

The geographical coordinates of Liouesso Hydroelectric Power Station are 1°26'07.0"N, 16°10'42.0"E (Latitude:1.435278; Longitude:16.178333).

== History ==
In 2006, the engineering, procurement and construction (EPC) contract for this power station was awarded to Clackson Power Company of South Africa. Later, the EPC contract was switched to the China Gezhouba Group Company (CGGC). CGGC was able to achieve financial close for this power station, in January 2014. On 30 May 2017, the completed power station was commercially commissioned.

== Overview ==
The power house comprises three Francis type turbines, each rated at 6.4 MW, for capacity generation of 19.2 MW. The energy generated here is distributed to the town of Ouesso and to neighboring villages in Ouesso District, in the Sangha Region.

== Construction costs and funding ==
It has been reported that the construction of this HPP cost about US$110 million. Other reliable references have indicated that the government of the Republic of the Congo invested US$92 million. The table below illustrates the funding sources for the power station.

Sources of Funding for Liouesso Hydroelectric Power Station
Rank	Name of Financier	Funding in USD (Millions)	Percentage	Notes
1	Government of the Republic of the Congo	92.0	83.6	
2	Other Financier (s)	18.0	6.4	
	Total	110.0	100.00	

== Rehabilitation ==
In May 2022, the government of the Republic of the Congo signed agreements with CGGC and ENERGAZ, a Congolese IPP, to rehabilitate this power station, whose output had drastically reduced and to expand the distribution network of the power plant which is not yet grid-connected.

== See also ==
- List of power stations in the Republic of the Congo
