= Lolo, Cameroon =

Village in East Region, Cameroon

Coordinates: 4°17′N 14°54′E

Lolo is a village in Kadey Department, East Region, Cameroon, which had a population of about 2,000 in 2013.

In the first months of 2014, the village of Lolo became home to approximately 10,000 refugees fleeing the Central African Republic. As of March 14, 2014, there were about 2,000 children in the camp.

On 21 February 2014, the UNHCR said the site, 46 kilometers from the border of the CAR, could take "up to 15,000 refugees."

On 3 June 2014, the World Food Programme reported:

A new round of food distributions began on 22 May. In Gado Badzere, Lolo, Borgop, and Timangolo sites 29,780 refugees in established sites and 17,369 refugees in transit points have benefitted from 30-day rations (total: 782 mt). Distributions are ongoing in Mbai Mboum and Garoua Boulai transit points.

A second location, designated "Lolo II", is located 3.4 km away, at Latitude 4.2833°, Longitude 14.9000°.

Mbilé Refugee Camp is located near the village.
