= Daniel Abibi =

Congolese politician, mathematician and diplomat

Daniel Abibi (born 1942) is a Congolese politician, mathematician and diplomat. During the 1980s, he served in the government of Congo-Brazzaville as Minister of Information and as Minister of Secondary and Higher Education. Later, during the 1990s, he was Congo-Brazzaville's Permanent Representative to the United Nations.

== Life and career ==
Abibi obtained his doctorate in mathematics in 1970 from the University of Grenoble in France. He was amongst the first Central Africans to receive doctoral degrees in Mathematics. Abibi was one of the Northern political activists educated in France that ensured support for Marien Ngouabi in the Congolese Students Association (AEC) in 1972. The rapprochement between AEC and the regime was, however, fiercely rejected by cadres of the Congolese Party of Labour (PCT). The PCT cadres kidnapped Abibi, forcing Ngouabi to order his release.

Politically, Abibi espoused a Marxist ideological line that was heavily influenced by radical African nationalism. He served as rector of the Marien Ngouabi University. Becoming a confidant of Denis Sassou Nguesso (espousing an ideological line to the liking of Sassou) Abibi was named Minister of Information, Posts and Telecommunications in 1983, replacing captain Florent Ntsiba. In 1984 Abibi was included in the Central Committee of the PCT. He was put in-charge of the international relations of the party. Also in 1984, he was moved from his post as Minister of Information to the post of Minister of Secondary and Higher Education. He lost his cabinet seat in a December 1986 reshuffle.

Abibi chaired the Congolese Anti-Apartheid Committee, and in 1989 he was named chairman of the African Anti-Apartheid Committee. Also in 1989, he was included in the PCT Politburo and assigned responsibility for education, ideology, and political and civic training.

In the 1990s he joined the Pan-African Union for Social Democracy of Pascal Lissouba. He also served as Permanent Representative of the Congo to the United Nations during this decade.

Following the June–October 1997 civil war, in which Lissouba was ousted and Sassou Nguesso returned to power, Abibi was absent from Congolese politics for years. Eventually, however, he rejoined Sassou Nguesso's party, the PCT. In October 2011, he was elected to the Senate of Congo-Brazzaville as a PCT candidate in Sangha Department. In the indirect Senate election, he received 61 votes from the electors in Sangha, 87.14% of the total; this placed Abibi in a three-way tie for first place and secured him one of the six available seats for Sangha.
