= Pokola =

Town and commune in the Republic of the Congo

- Town and commune
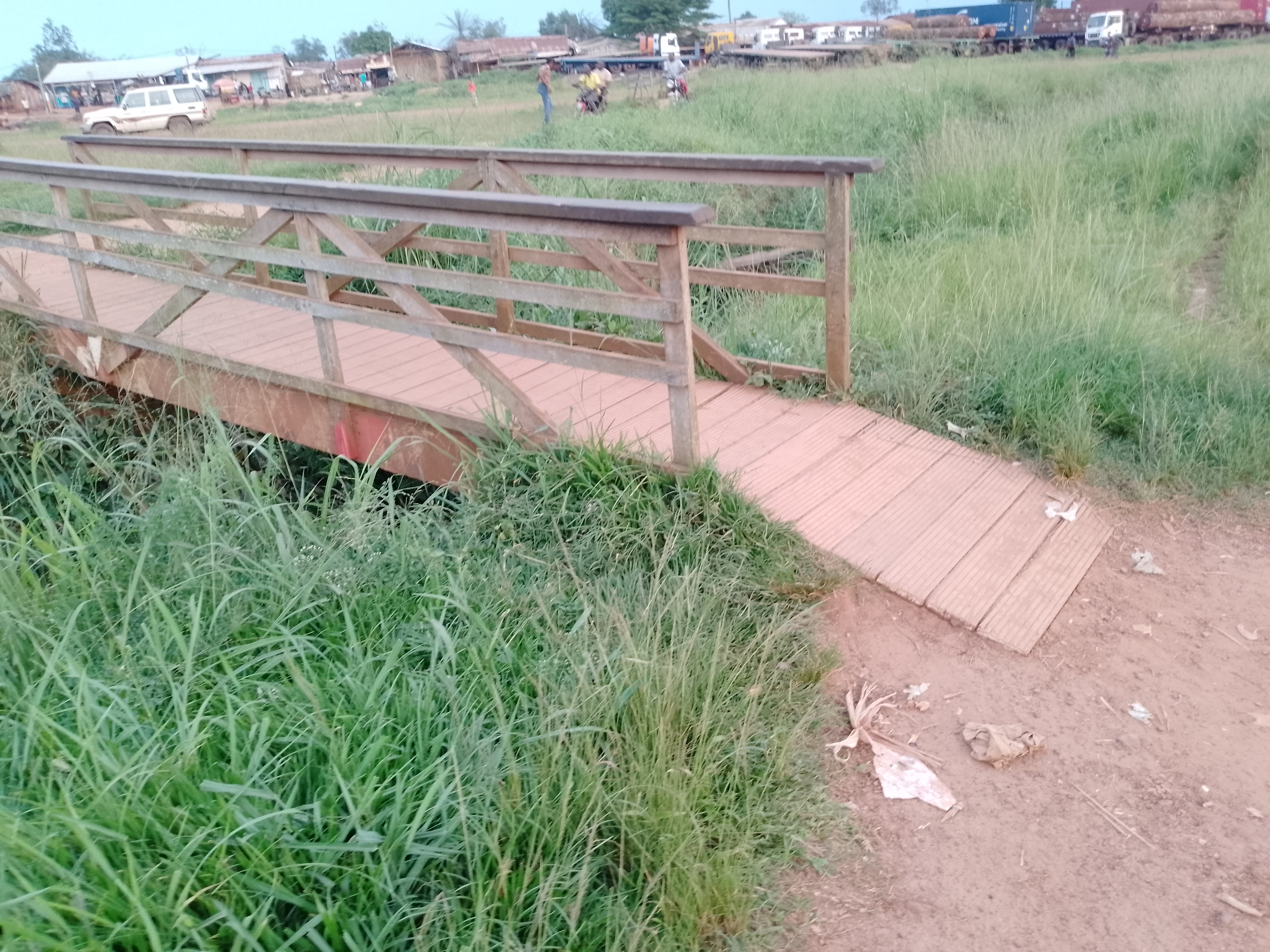
- Pokola in 2023

- Location in the Republic of the Congo
- Coordinates: 1°24′42″N 16°19′22″E
- Country: Republic of the Congo
- Department: Sangha Department
- District: Kabo District
- Commune: Pokola

Area
  - Total: 3.6 sq mi (9.3 km^{2})

Population (2023)
  - Total: 28,570
  - Density: 8,000/sq mi (3,100/km^{2})

Pokola is a town and a commune located in the northern Republic of Congo in the Sangha Department. In 2023, the town had a population of 28,570.

== Economy ==
Pokola relies on extractive industries, such as logging and hunting, for its economy.

=== Bushmeat ===
The Pokola area has not been anthropized, making agriculture difficult.

Because of the little access to farmland, Pokola residents rely on illegal bushmeat for food, with over 5% of meals eaten in Pokola being bushmeat in 2002, a rise from 1% in 2001. Pokola is hunted for ivory to then trade in Ouésso and Cameroon. Bushmeat is often brought and sold directly in the city.

Local police rarely interfere with the bushmeat trade, and the United States Agency for International Development had performed investigations to slow trade.

=== Logging ===
The town is the headquarters of one of the largest logging companies in the country, the Congolaise Industrielle des Bois (CIB), a subsidiary of a Singapore group. The company owns 1.8 million hectares of forest, and funds most of the construction in the town.

In 2010, the Parliament of the Republic of the Congo passed a law to protect the country's Baka people and their lands. This made it more difficult to harvest wood.

=== Transportation ===
Pokola lies along the Sangha river, and is connected to Ouésso by ferry, until 2023, when the Chinese National Development and Reform Commission built the Sangha Bridge and the Ouésso-Pokola Road, which connected the Pokola with Ouésso. The groundbreaking ceremony was attended by president Denis Sassou Nguesso.
