= Scholastique Dianzinga =

Congolese historian

- Born: Brazzaville
- Citizenship: Republic of Congo
- Known for: Writing women's history in the Republic of Congo

Academic background
- Education: University of Paris-VII
- Thesis: Les femmes congolaises du début de la colonisation à 1960 (1998)
- Doctoral advisor: Christian Desplat

Academic work
- Discipline: History
- Sub-discipline: Women's history
- Institutions: Marien Ngouabi University; Higher School of Management and Business Administration (ESGEA)

Scholastique Dianzinga is a historian from the Republic of Congo, who specialises in women's history. As of 2025 she is Professor of Contemporary History at the Higher School of Management and Business Administration (ESGEA). She is recognised as one of the highest ranking woman historians in Africa and has campaigned for greater recognition of women in Africa, both in historical research and in public monuments.

== Biography ==
Dianzinga was born in Brazzaville. She graduated from University of Paris-VII in 1998 with a PhD entitled Les femmes congolaises du début de la colonisation à 1960; her supervisor was Christian Desplat. By 2019 she was lecturer at Marien Ngouabi University, and has since retired. As of 2025 she is Professor of Contemporary History at the Higher School of Management and Business Administration (ESGEA).

Specialising in women's history, in her introduction to Djiha by Gabriel Entcha-Ebia, Dianzinga described how the play questioned women's futures. Dianzinga's other works focussed on the history of education, the Catholic church, HIV/AIDS in Congo, the lives of Jane Vialle and Hélène Bouboutou, Alice Badiangana and Marie Gamavelle, amongst other subjects. She edited, with Jeanne Dambendzet, the volume La place et le rôle des femmes dans la société congolaise, 1960-2010, which also included contributions from Élise Thérèse Gamassa and others. It recorded the history of women in the Republic of Congo since independence and broached ideas about why women's emancipation has been hindered. She has campaigned for greater recognition of women in Africa, both in historical research and in public monuments, citing memorials to Kimpa Vita and Nijinga as progress in this regard.

Dianzinga is recognised as the highest ranking woman historian in Africa, alongside Virginie Wanyaka Bonguen Oyongmen.

== Selected works ==
- Koualou, Esther Ornella, and Scholastique DIANZINGA. "Partir aux colonies: cas du voyage de la France au Congo de 1880 à 1939." Les Cahiers de l'Igrac 1.16 (2019): 315-336.
- Dianzinga, Scholastique. "Parcours de femmes dans l'histoire du Congo (1892-1985)." Sciences Humaines 1.5 (2016).
- Mouckaga, Hugues, Scholastique Dianzinga, and Jean-François Owaye. "Ethnies, nations et développement en Afrique: quelle gouvernance: actes du colloque de Brazzaville, Congo, du 26 au 28 mai 2014." (2015).
- Dambendzet, Jeanne, Scholastique Dianzinga, and T. Gamassa. "La place et le rôle des femmes dans la société congolaise 1960-2010: Bilan et perspective." (2011).
- Dianzinga, Scholastique. "Les élites féminines, moteurs de la culture... et du politique." Brazzaville, une ville à reconstruire: recompositions citadines (2006): 81.
