= Gbiti =

- Location in Cameroon
- Coordinates: 4°42′2″N 14°42′36″E
- Country: Cameroon
- Province: East Province
- Department: Kadey
- Communes: Kette

Gbiti is a border town in the East Province in Cameroon.

== Border post ==
On 16 November 2013, "unidentified gunmen from the Central African Republic (CAR)" attacked the Cameroonian border post at Gbiti. "Seven people died in the attack."

In 2013, the Kimberly Process’ Permanent Secretariat conducted an awareness campaign in the town about the importance of stopping the trade in blood diamonds, which could be used to finance Cameroonian gangs or political violence in the Central African Republic.

== Refugee transit center ==
The town has been impacted by the refugees escaping the Central African Republic.

As of May 26, 2014, 21,451 refugees from have crossed into Cameroon, and been received at the Gbiti transit center.

Refugees assemble at the Gbiti transit center, and are transported to other locations, such as the refugee camp at Mbilé, located "four hours away by bus."

A YouTube video shot on a mobile phone by a relief worker in April 2014 documents a group of exhausted, malnourished people slowly crossing the river to enter Gbiti. Many refugees have suffered severe injuries in attacks by CAR Anti-balaka rebels. One seven-year-old boy arriving with severe machete injuries was saved by treatment at the nearest hospital, located in Bertoua, three hours' drive away.

== Town life ==
Full video coverage of town life is available in a 33-minute French language video by Alexandre Vigot.

== See also ==
- Communes of Cameroon
