= Mbang =

Mbang may refer to:

- Mbang, Cameroon, a commune in Kadey, Est region
- Mbang, a term for a ruler of Bagirmi
