= André Okombi Salissa =

Congolese politician

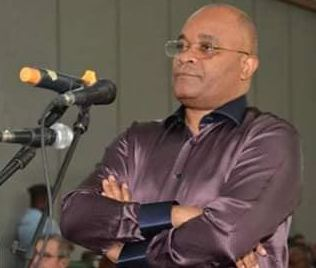
André Okombi Salissa

André Okombi Salissa is a Congolese politician. As a member of the ruling Congolese Labour Party (PCT), he served in the government of Congo-Brazzaville from 1997 to 2012. He was also the President-Coordinator of the Action Committee for the Defense of Democracy - Youth Movement (CADD-MJ). After his dismissal from the government, he moved into opposition, becoming the President of the Initiative for Democracy in Congo and standing as a candidate in the 2016 presidential election.

== Political career ==
Okombi Salissa was born at Lekana, located in the Plateaux Region of Congo-Brazzaville; he is an ethnic Téké. He participated in the June–October 1997 civil war on the side of opposition leader Denis Sassou Nguesso, helping to lead Sassou Nguesso's rebel Cobra militia.

The Cobra militia prevailed in October 1997, capturing Brazzaville and returning Sassou Nguesso to power. As President, Sassou Nguesso appointed Okombi Salissa as Minister of Technical and Vocational Education on 2 November 1997. Okombi Salissa's portfolio was expanded on 12 January 1999, when he was appointed as Minister of Technical and Vocational Education, in charge of the Redeployment of the Youth, Civic Instruction, and Sports. In the 2002 parliamentary election, he was elected to the National Assembly as the PCT candidate in Lekana constituency; he defeated Minister of Public Works Florent Ntsiba in the second round of voting, held in June 2002.

After the 2002 election, Okombi Salissa remained in the government and was moved to the post of Minister of Labour, Employment, and Social Security on 18 August 2002. He was accordingly succeeded by Pierre-Michel Nguimbi at the Ministry of Technical and Vocational Education on 23 August 2002, and he in turn succeeded René-Dambert Ndouane at the Ministry of Labour on 26 August 2002. The newspaper Le Choc reported on 20 July 2004 that Okombi Salissa, together with three former ministers, had been barred from leaving the country without Sassou Nguesso's approval due to suspicions that they had misused public funds. This report was denied on the next day by public prosecutor Georges Akiéra.

Okombi Salissa was moved from his post as Minister of Labour, Employment, and Social Security to that of Minister of Transport and Civil Aviation on 7 January 2005, and he succeeded Isidore Mvouba at the head of the Ministry of Transport on 25 January. Two years later, on 3 March 2007, he was instead appointed as Minister of Tourism and the Environment; following that appointment, he was succeeded as Minister of Transport and Civil Aviation by Emile Ouosso on 12 March 2007. As a result of Okombi Salissa's appointment as Minister of Tourism and the Environment, he became President of the African Ministerial Conference on the Environment (AMCEN) because AMCEN was chaired by Congo-Brazzaville at that time.

In the June–August 2007 parliamentary election, Okombi Salissa was again elected to the National Assembly as the PCT candidate in Lekana; he won the seat in the first round with 91.34% of the vote. Following the election, he remained Minister of Tourism and the Environment in the government appointed on 30 December 2007. He was President of AMCEN until its 12th Session in June 2008, when South Africa assumed the presidency instead.

As of 2007, Okombi Salissa was the President-Coordinator of the Action Committee for the Defense of Democracy - Youth Movement (CADD-MJ), a political association affiliated with the PCT; he also served as the PCT's Permanent Secretary for Youth, Categorical Unions, and Associated Movements. At CADD-MJ's Second Ordinary Congress in December 2007, he was re-elected by acclamation as President-Coordinator of the Central Council of the CADD-MJ.

The CADD-MJ was critically characterized as a "private militia", and Okombi Salissa described as an occultist. Okombi Salissa owns a number of properties in Brazzaville, including a hotel in the Moungali district called Les Bourgeois.

At the time of the July 2009 presidential election, Okombi Salissa was Head of the Voter Mobilization Department for Sassou Nguesso's re-election campaign. After Sassou Nguesso won re-election, he moved Okombi Salissa to the post of Minister of Technical and Vocational Education, Skills Training, and Employment on 15 September 2009. At the PCT's Sixth Extraordinary Congress, held in July 2011, Okombi Salissa was elected to the PCT's 51-member Political Bureau.

In the July–August 2012 parliamentary election, Okombi Salissa was again elected to the National Assembly as the PCT candidate in Lekana; he won the seat in the first round of voting. Following the election, Okombi Salissa was dismissed from the government on 25 September 2012 after 15 years of continuous service; he was succeeded by Serge Blaise Zoniaba at the Ministry of Technical and Vocational Education on 27 September 2012.

The CADD-MJ was dissolved in 2013, effectively leaving Okombi Salissa in the political wilderness, although he remained on the PCT Political Bureau and was a Deputy in the National Assembly. Subsequently he purportedly planned to stand as a presidential candidate in the 2016 election, although reaction to his purported plans was generally dismissive. He began living in "voluntary exile" in France in 2013. He was indefinitely suspended from the PCT Central Committee in December 2013 for failing to engage in party work and instead working with other organizations.

Due to his long absence, Okombi Salissa attracted attention by returning to the National Assembly at the opening of a parliamentary budget session on 15 October 2014. However, he remained a dissenting voice within the PCT. Prior to a government-sponsored dialogue held at Sibiti in July 2015 to discuss potential constitutional changes which could allow Sassou Nguesso to run for another term, Okombi Salissa said on 11 July 2015 that it would merely be a "monologue", not a real dialogue. PCT Secretary-General Pierre Ngolo responded that it was a genuine dialogue and that Okombi Salissa's "positions are truly at odds with those of the party", describing him as "a friend gone astray" and questioning whether he wanted to remain in the party.

Okombi Salissa later became President of the Initiative for Democracy in Congo, and he announced on 30 January 2016 that he planned to stand against Sassou Nguesso as a candidate in the March 2016 presidential election. A warrant was issued for Okombi Salissa's arrest in December 2016 on allegations of illegal weapons possession. He eluded the authorities for some time, but he was arrested on 10 January 2017. Okombi was still a Deputy in the National Assembly, but his parliamentary immunity was removed by the National Assembly on 19 January 2017, and he was charged on 23 January.
