= Letioukbala =

Mont Letioukbala
- Location within Republic of the Congo

Highest point
- Elevation: 664 m (2,178 ft)
- Coordinates: 1°39′50″N 13°58′35″E

Geography
- Location: Republic of the Congo

Mont Letioukbala is a mountain in the north-western sector of the Republic of Congo, located in the Sangha Department. It is near the borders of Cameroon and Gabon.

== Gold ore and mining ==
According to the Republic of Congo government, gold ore deposits were found in the Virunga Mountains near Mont Letioukbala. As a result of this, in 2022, a company received an agreement to prospect the area.
