= Jane Vialle =

French journalist, politician and women's rights activist (1906–1953)

- Born: Ouésso, Ubangi-Shari
- Died: 9 February 1953; Villenave d'Ornon
- Citizenship: France
- Occupations: Journalist, politician, women's rights activist

Jane or Jeanne Vialle (1906 – 9 February 1953) was a French journalist, politician and women's rights activist. She was a member of the French Resistance, and one of the first two black female senators in France.

== Life ==
Jeanne Vialle was born in 1906 in Ouésso in Ubangi-Shari, now modern-day Republic of the Congo. She studied at the Lycée Jules-Ferry in Paris and gained her baccalauréat. Then she became a journalist at Opéra Mundi, an information agency. In 1940, she joined the resistance against the Nazi occupation of France. Arrested in Marseille in 1943 and jailed, she managed to escape before the war ended. She was awarded the Resistance Medal.

After the end of World War II, Vialle joined Agence France-Presse where she monitored the relationships between France and its colonies in the fourth French Republic. In July 1946, she founded her own political party, l'Evolution pour l 'Afrique Noire (APEAN; Association for Evolution of Black Africa). In January 1947, she was elected to the Council of the Republic representing Ubangui-Chari, and joined the socialist group there. She was re-elected in November 1948.

She served as one of the seven members of the Ad Hoc Committee on Slavery of the UN in 1950-1951.

She died on 9 February 1953 in a plane accident in Villenave d'Ornon.

== Legacy ==
The impact of her life has been researched by historian Scholastique Dianzinga.
