= Mandingha Kosso Moanda =

Congolese academic

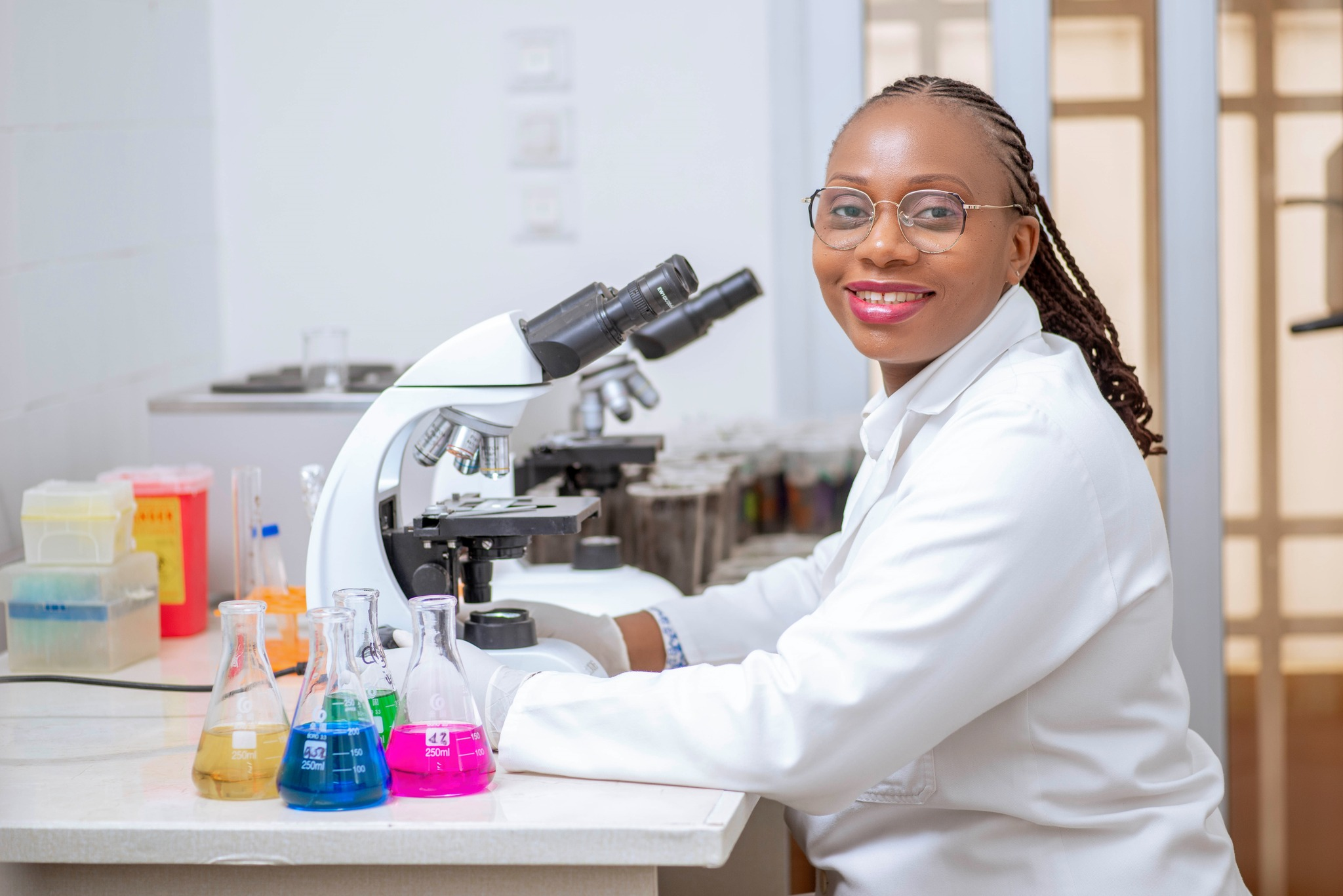

Mandingha Kosso Moanda is a Congolese academic and ambassador of the Next Einstein Forum.

Moanda was educated at the Marien Ngouabi University.
