= Sembé District =

Coordinates: 1°42′N 14°46′E

Sembé
- District
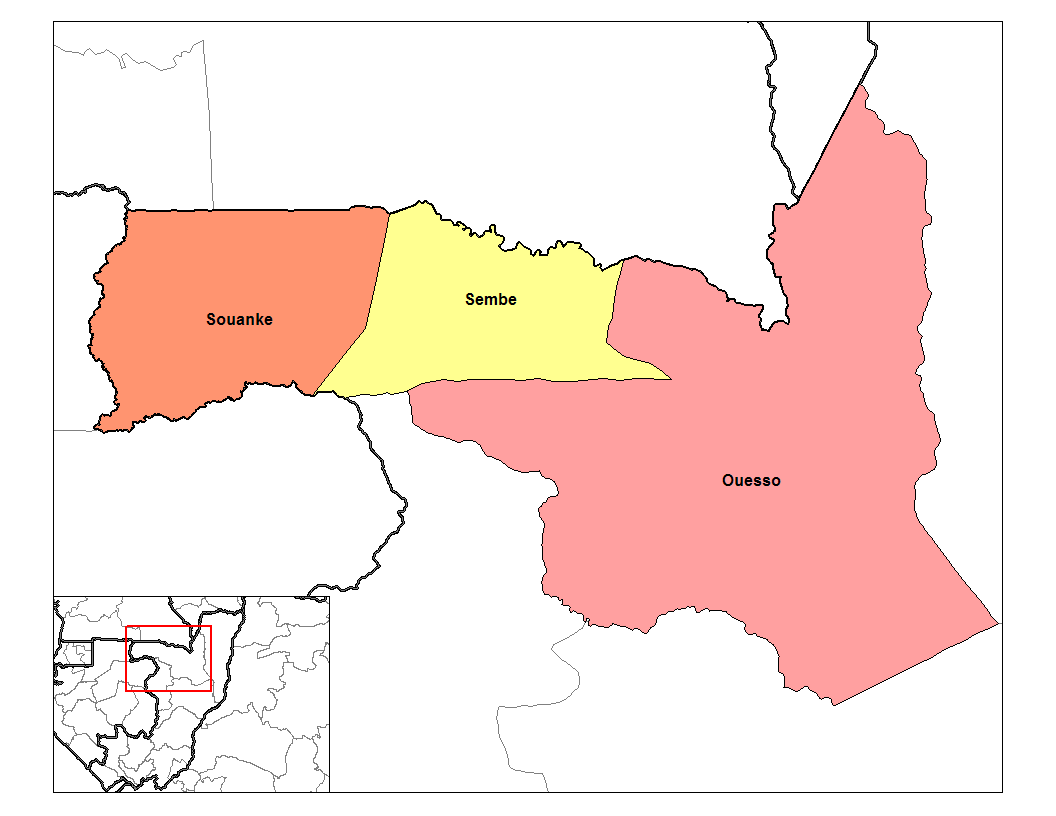
- Sembé District in the region
- Country: Republic of the Congo
- Department: Sangha Department

Area
  - Total: 2,660 sq mi (6,889 km^{2})

Population (2023 census)
  - Total: 18,661
  - Density: 7.016/sq mi (2.709/km^{2})
- Time zone: UTC+1 (GMT +1)

Sembé is a district in the Sangha Region of north-western Republic of the Congo. The capital lies at Sembé.
