= Kentzou =

Town in East Region, Cameroon

- Commune and town
- Location in Cameroon
- Coordinates: 4°10′N 15°02′E
- Country: Cameroon
- Region: East
- Department: Kadey
- Time zone: UTC+1 (WAT)

Kentzou is a town and commune in Cameroon.

== Refugees ==
In the first months of 2014, the town became a destination for refugees fleeing violence in the Central African Republic.

The border town of Kentzou was amongst the areas most heavily affected as refugee arrivals peaked between February and March. According to Emmanuel Halpha, the prefect of the Batouri area in the east of Cameroon, Kentzou’s population “tripled in record time”.

UNHCR Cameroon estimated that as of May 5, 2014, 11,971 people had crossed into Cameroon at Kentzou.

According to IRIN, some of the refugees in Kentzou are third country nationals.

Unlike refugees who are protected by international conventions, third-country nationals (TCNs), who neither belong to the country of refuge or the one they fled, are not covered by any global rights conventions. It is often up to their governments to look after them and arrange for their repatriation.

As of June 2014 in Kentzou, "embassy delegations have visited their nationals, including Malians, Nigerians, Nigeriens and Senegalese, offering cash and other donations of basic necessities, but not flights back home."

== See also ==
- Communes of Cameroon
