= Garoua-Boulaï =

Town in Cameroon

- Commune and town
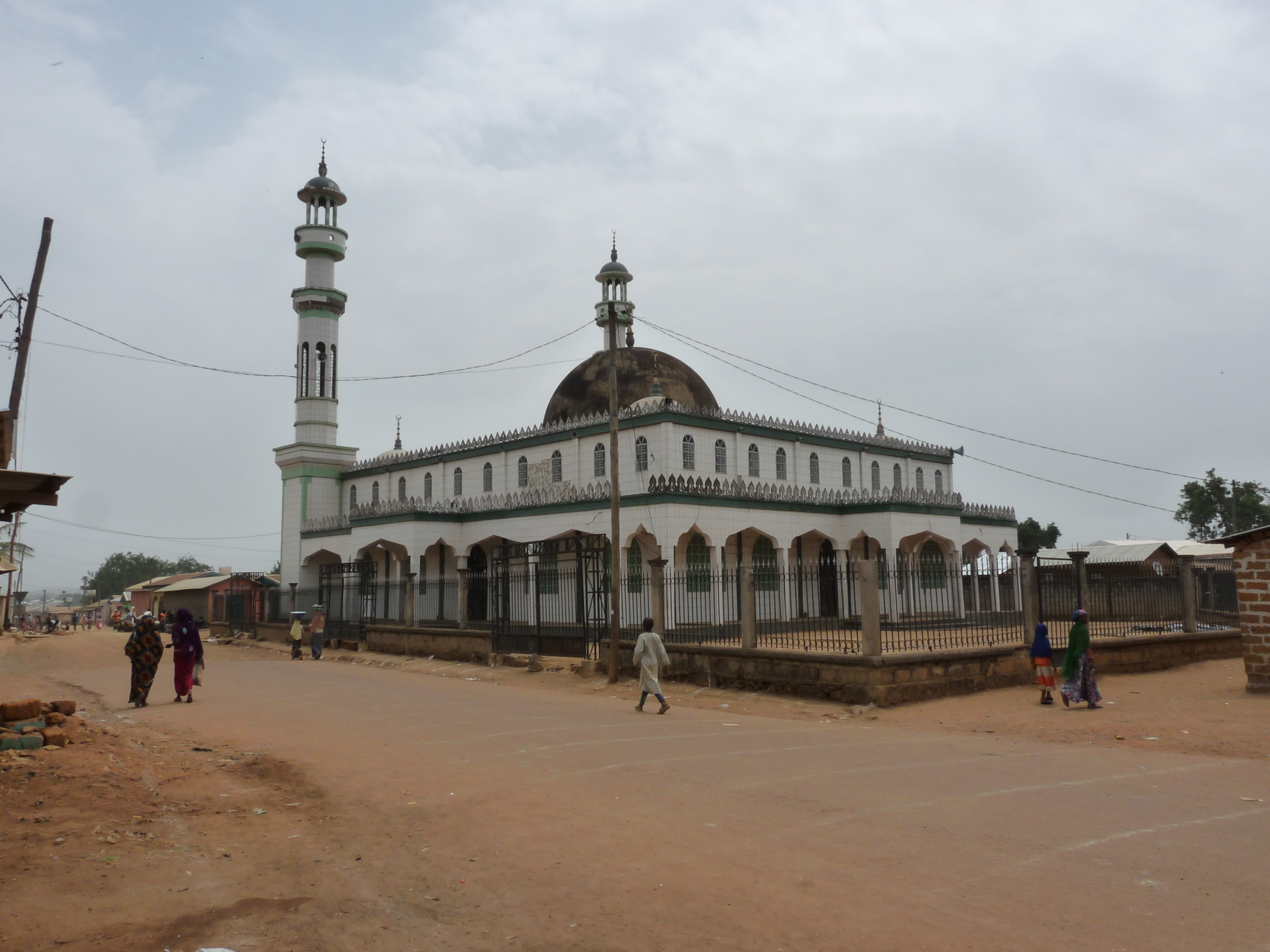

- Location in Cameroon
- Coordinates: 5°53′N 14°33′E
- Country: Cameroon
- Region: East
- Department: Lom-et-Djérem
- Elevation: 996 m (3,268 ft)

Population (2012)
  - Total: 22,882
- Time zone: UTC+1 (WAT)

Garoua-Boulaï (or Garoua-Boulay) is a town and commune in Cameroon. The town is on the border with the Central African Republic. Across the border, the nearest CAR settlement accessible by road is Baboua.

== Refugees ==
In 2014, the town was severely impacted by the number of refugees fleeing the Central African Republic. On 12 March 2014, IRIN reported:

Some 30,000 refugees and returnees are estimated to have fled to East Region, where they are staying in the border towns of Garoua-Boulai, Kenzou and Yokadouma, living in squalid conditions, sleeping under trees, trucks and tents - some provided by the UN Refugee Agency (UNHCR), some cobbled together by refugees. Others have been taken into people’s homes - some of them relatives, some not.

“Garoua-Boulai is overstrained by the different groups of refugees, and the situation is getting out of hand,” said the town’s mayor, Esther Yaffo Ndoe. “The refugees outweigh the capacity of UNHCR, the Red Cross and MSF, and the only government hospital is overwhelmed with patients,” she told IRIN ...

UNHCR and the Cameroon Red Cross (CRC) are registering refugees for transfer to a camp in Mborguéne, 50km from Garoua-Bulai, but the site is more or less devoid of basic services. There are just two wells and one school, which is not functional. The nearest health clinic is 27 km away from the camp. Getting it up to scratch will require a lot of work.

Refugees are being "moved from Garoua Boulay to the new site at Mborguene, which can host up to 10,000 people."

As of April 2014, a spokesperson for UNHCR stated:

The main entry points at Garoua Boulai and Kentzou [are] no longer accessible due to anti-Balaka activities, people are using alternative routes. “This has caused the number of entry points into Cameroon to grow from 12 to 27 over last three weeks, making it more challenging for our colleagues to monitor the border.”

== Transport ==
Two trans-African automobile routes pass through Garoua-Boulai:

- Tripoli-Cape Town Highway
- Lagos-Mombasa Highway

== See also ==
- Communes of Cameroon
