= Souanké =

- Location in the Republic of the Congo
- Coordinates: 2°05′N 14°08′E
- Country: Republic of the Congo
- Department: Sangha Department
- District: Souanké District

Population (2023 census)
  - Total: 10,599

Souanké is a city and capital of Souanké District in the Sangha Region of northwestern Republic of the Congo, located close to the border with Cameroon. The city is located around 50 km (31 mi) north-east of Mont Nabemba, the highest point in the country.

The city is served by Souanké Airport.

== History ==
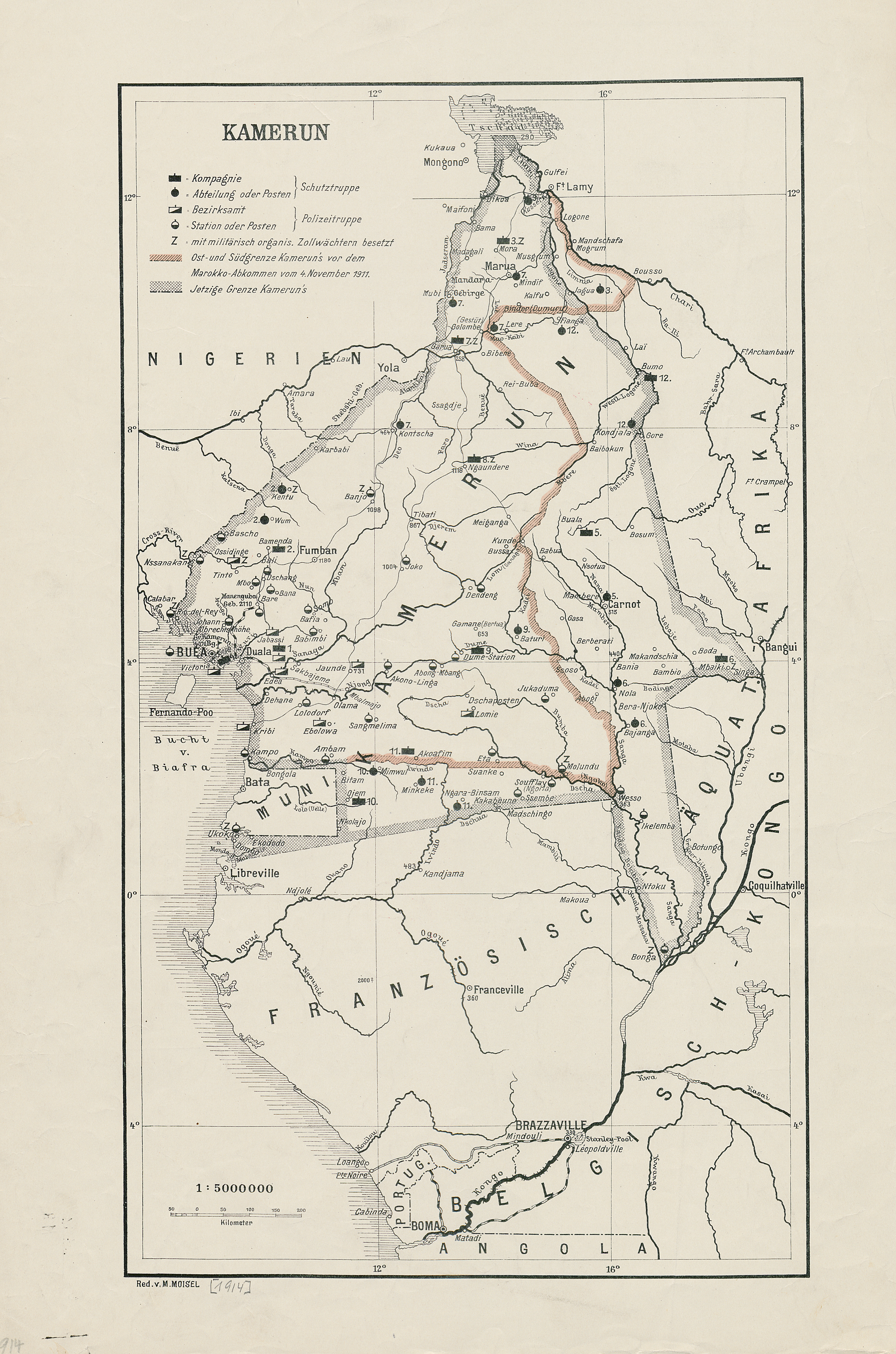
Altkamerun and Neukamerun in 1914

The city was part of the French Congo until 1910, when it was merged alongside other french colonies into the French Equatorial Africa then in 1911, it was ceded to the german colony of Kamerun, and was included in the Neukamerun (that was planned to become the Mittelafrika) as part of the settlement of the Agadir Crisis, resolved by the Treaty of Fes. It received the name of Suanke.

In 1916, it was reconquered by the French, and de jure re-annexed in 1919 with the Treaty of Versailles, and has been part of the Republic of the Congo since 1960.

== Notable people ==
- Gabriel Entcha-Ebia (born 1956), Congolese politician
