= Pierre-Michel Nguimbi =

Congolese politician

Pierre-Michel Nguimbi (born 1957) is a Congolese politician who served in the government of Congo-Brazzaville as Minister of Technical and Vocational Education from 2002 to 2009. Previously, he briefly served as Minister of Scientific and Technological Development in 1992, and he was Ambassador to Israel and Ambassador to France during the mid-1990s. After leaving the government, he was Ambassador to Senegal from 2012 to 2017.

== Political career ==
Nguimbi was born at Dolisie in 1957. Under President Pascal Lissouba, he was Minister of Scientific and Technological Development and Technical and Vocational Education from September 1992 to December 1992 as part of the short-lived government of Prime Minister Stéphane Maurice Bongho-Nouarra. After that government lost its parliamentary majority and was replaced, Nguimbi served as President Lissouba's Science and Technology Adviser from 1993 to 1994. He was subsequently posted as Congo's Ambassador to Israel from 1994 to 1995 and as Ambassador to France from 1995 to 1997, with additional accreditation to Spain, Portugal, Switzerland, the United Kingdom and the Holy See.

Presented as the undisputed leader of the south of Congo, he does not hide his ambitions to replace one day his master in politics, Denis Sassou Nguesso, at the head of the country.

In 2002, when the Club 2002 was formed, Nguimbi became a member of its National Executive Bureau. After the May–June 2002 parliamentary election, Nguimbi was appointed as Minister of Technical and Vocational Education on 18 August 2002. He succeeded André Okombi Salissa at the head of that ministry on 23 August 2002. Nguimbi eventually left the Club 2002 and joined the Congolese Labour Party (PCT).

In the June–August 2007 parliamentary election, Nguimbi was elected to the National Assembly as the PCT candidate in the first constituency of Dolisie. He was retained as Minister of Technical and Vocational Education in the government appointed on 30 December 2007.

After nine years as Minister of Technical and Vocational Education, Nguimbi was dismissed from the government on 15 September 2009. He subsequently returned to his seat in the National Assembly.

As of 2010, Nguimbi is the President of the Circle for the Renaissance of Dolisie, an organization promoting local development in Dolisie.

In the July–August 2012 parliamentary election, Nguimbi was re-elected to the National Assembly as the PCT candidate in Louvakou constituency. He won the seat in the second round of voting, receiving 54.38% of the vote against 45.62% for UPADS candidate Auguste Boussoukou. However, soon afterward he took up the post of Ambassador to Senegal, presenting his credentials to Senegalese President Macky Sall in December 2012. He additionally presented his credentials as Ambassador to the Gambia on 5 November 2012, and he had a meeting with Gambian Vice-President Isatou Njie-Saidy on 6 November. Aside from Senegal and the Gambia, Nguimbi was also accredited as ambassador to several other West African countries: Burkina Faso, Mali, Mauritania, Guinea, Guinea-Bissau, and Cape Verde.

On 11 November 2013, Nguimbi was awarded the medal for the rank of Commander of the National Order of Peace, an honorary order in Congo-Brazzaville.

As part of a restructuring of Congolese diplomacy, Nguimbi was one of 16 ambassadors who were dismissed from their posts and recalled on 25 January 2017.
