= Pierre M'Pelé =

- Born: November 1954 (age 71); Pointe-Noire, Republic of Congo
- Education: Marien Ngouabi University
- Occupation: Mercy Ships Africa Bureau Director
- Writing career
- Period: 20th century

Pierre Kilebou M'Pelé is an African public health personality, HIV/AIDS and Tropical disease specialist, and former WHO Country Representative. Since July 2017, he has been the Mercy Ships Africa Bureau Director.

== Early life ==
M'Pelé received his medical degrer in 1982 and has received several post-doctoral degrees, which include degrees in Epidemiology, Tropical disease, Nutrition, Leprology and Public Health. He completed his training by being a clinic attaché at the Pitié-Salpêtrière Hospital in Paris, at the Department of Public Health, Tropical Medicine and Infectious Diseases under Professor Marc Gentilini. M'Pele has been, since the beginning of the HIV pandemic, a pioneer and advocate of the fight against HIV/AIDS in Africa and human rights activist for the People Living with HIV.

== Career ==
While Director of the National AIDS Control Programme from 1987 to 1998, M'Pelé was simultaneously Director of the National Laboratory of Public Health Cité Louis Pasteur and Medical Chief of the Treatment Center of the Teaching Medical Hospital of Brazzaville. He was also Head of Mission and Advisor in charge Health, Social Protection and Science to the Presidency of the Republic of Congo. In 1995, M'Pelé was elected President of the African Society against AIDS - a position he held until 2005.

M'Pelé worked as an international consultant for UNDP, International Federation of Red Cross and Red Crescent Societies, IPPF, US Government USAID, WHO and UNICEF. He was also a lecturer at the Institute of Social and Economic Studies at Pantheon-Sorbonne University. M'Pelé led several training activities in the field of Public Health on both national and international levels.

From 2000 to 2004, M'Pelé led the UNAIDS Inter-country Team for West and Central Africa (25 countries) based in Abidjan (Ivory Coast), and, from 2004 to 2007, he was the UNAIDS Country Coordinator for Nigeria. In April 2007, M'Pelé joined the WHO as a Country Representative in Equatorial Guinea from 2007-2010. In 2010, he was named the WHO Country Representative in Togo until 2013 and then WHO Representative to Ethiopia since 15 January 2013. From November 2015 to November 2016, M’Pele was WHO Representative to Benin.

In May 2016, M’Pele was appointed by the Mercy Ships International Board as Africa Ambassador for Mercy Ships, with the responsibility of cultivating relationships across the African Continent and from July 2017, he has been the Mercy Ships Africa Bureau Director.

Aside from his medical career, he is a Colonel of the Armed Forces of the Republic of the Congo and has been established in 2010 as Chief of the Benue State in Nigeria.

== Awards & Recognitions ==
M'Pelé has received several scientific awards such as the 1988 Noury Lemarrié Award from the French Society of Exotic Pathology. He is a Commander of the French Legion of honor (1996), a Knight of the Senegalese National Order of the Lion (1998), a Knight of the National Order of Burkina Faso (2000) and a recipient of the Public Health Medal of Honor of the Republic of the Congo (1989).

He is the author and co-author of several books and over 100 articles and scientific papers. He has been quoted as saying "If there is no vaccine, it will be like a war for us" by The New York Times in 1988 about HIV/AIDS.
