= Batouri =

- Town
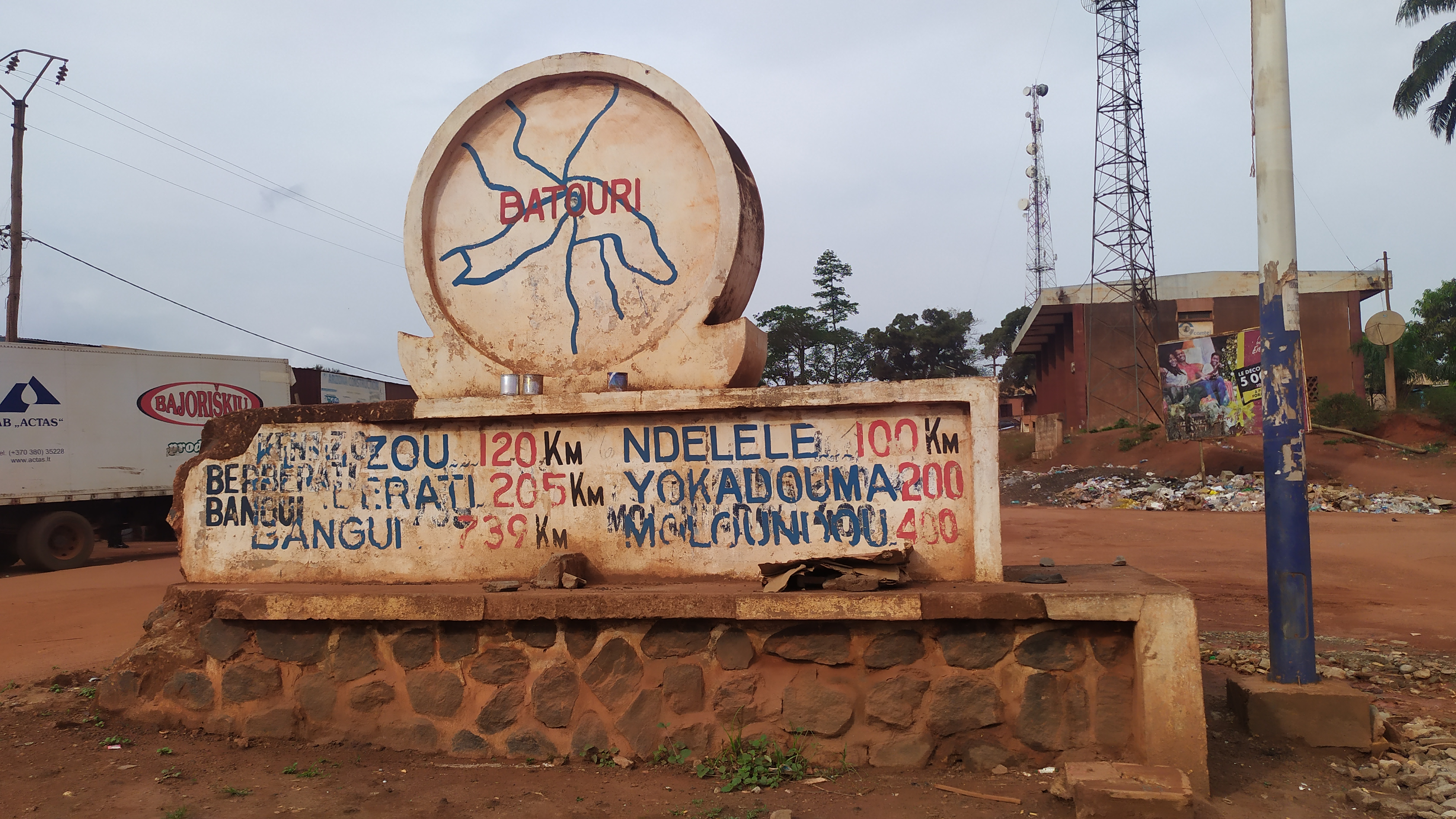
- View of Batouri

- Location in Cameroon
- Coordinates: 4°26′07″N 14°21′42″E
- Country: Cameroon
- Province: East
- Department: Kadey
- Elevation: 617 m (2,024 ft)

Population (2023)
  - Total: 75,000
- Time zone: UTC+01:00 (WAT)

Batouri is a town and commune in the East Province of Cameroon. It is the second largest municipality in the province after the provincial capital Bertoua. It is located on the main (though unpaved) road connecting Bertoua to the Central African Republic and to the Cameroonian town of Yokadouma. It had an estimated 75,000 inhabitants as of 2023.

== People ==
Batouri is mostly dominated by fulbe/fulani people and a large percentage of the population speaks the Fulani language fulfulde. However several other ethnic groups, such as the Baya, Yangélé, and the Mézimé are also native to the area. In addition there are many recent immigrants to the Batouri area. Many come from other parts of southern Cameroon and speak other Bantu languages. There is also a large Muslim population in town living mainly in the Mokolo quarter. Most people speak French though Fulfulde serves as a lingua franca for much of the Muslim community and is spoken widely throughout the town. There are also a number of other language groups, notably Arabic . There are a number of Cameroonian English and Cameroonian Pidgin speakers as well. All of the languages spoken, except for the colonial languages, Pidgin, and Arabic are part of the Niger–Congo family.

== Geography ==
Batouri lies on the South Cameroon Plateau at an elevation of about 653 m (2142 ft). It has a Guinea type climate which is hot and humid for most of the year with a dry season from mid-November to early March, then another small one in July. The wettest times of the year are April and May and then August through October. October is the wettest month with an average of 240.6 mm (9.5 in) of rain and January is the driest with an average of 17.3 mm (0.68 in). The average annual precipitation is 1479.4 mm (58.2 in).

Temperature extremes are greatest during the dry season with the highest average high temperatures of 32.1 °C (89.8 °F) in February and the lowest average lows of 17.1 °C (62.8 °F) in January. Meanwhile, the wet season produces more tempered average daily temperature fluctuations with both July and August having average highs 27.4 °C (81.3 °F), and average lows of 27.4 °C (66.0 °F).

Like Bertoua, Batouri lies in an area of transition of vegetation and climatic zones. In a simplified description the Guinea savanna vegetation lies north of the town while the lowland rainforest vegetation lies south of the town. However, much of the forest around Batouri is severely degraded. Wooded areas follow rivers northward and can extend many miles into the surrounding Guinea vegetation.

The topography consists mostly of gently rolling hills. There is a large granite outcrop called Mt. Pandi about 25 km (15.5 mi) north of town, just west of the P5 road to Ngoura.

The Kadéï River flows just west of town (3.5 km or 2 mi). The area all drains into the Kadéï and is part of the large Congo River basin.

=== Climate ===
Batouri has a tropical savanna climate (Köppen climate classification Aw).

Climate data for Batouri
Month	Jan	Feb	Mar	Apr	May	Jun	Jul	Aug	Sep	Oct	Nov	Dec	Year
Mean daily maximum °C (°F)	30.9 (87.6)	32.1 (89.8)	31.6 (88.9)	31.1 (88.0)	30.2 (86.4)	28.6 (83.5)	27.4 (81.3)	27.4 (81.3)	28.3 (82.9)	28.9 (84.0)	29.5 (85.1)	29.3 (84.7)	29.6 (85.3)
Daily mean °C (°F)	23.7 (74.7)	25.4 (77.7)	25.8 (78.4)	25.5 (77.9)	24.9 (76.8)	23.8 (74.8)	23.1 (73.6)	23.2 (73.8)	23.6 (74.5)	23.9 (75.0)	23.9 (75.0)	23.1 (73.6)	24.2 (75.6)
Mean daily minimum °C (°F)	17.1 (62.8)	18.6 (65.5)	19.7 (67.5)	20.0 (68.0)	19.6 (67.3)	19.1 (66.4)	18.9 (66.0)	18.9 (66.0)	18.9 (66.0)	18.8 (65.8)	18.4 (65.1)	17.0 (62.6)	18.7 (65.7)
Average precipitation mm (inches)	17.3 (0.68)	32.5 (1.28)	101.2 (3.98)	121.5 (4.78)	172.8 (6.80)	153.9 (6.06)	135.0 (5.31)	165.3 (6.51)	221.5 (8.72)	240.6 (9.47)	91.9 (3.62)	25.9 (1.02)	1,479.4 (58.24)
Average precipitation days (≥ 1.0 mm)	2	4	9	12	15	14	12	15	19	22	10	3	137
Mean monthly sunshine hours	172.0	171.0	173.7	187.3	202.2	154.3	118.0	99.8	125.3	151.7	186.0	175.7	1,917
Source: NOAA

== Institutions ==
Batouri is home to a post office, three health centers, a government hospital, an Adventist hospital, and a Catholic health centre (Centre de Santé Catholique). It is the seat of the prefecture for the Kadey Department and it is the seat of Catholic Dioceses and three parishes (St. Martin, St. John and Notre Dame).

Hospitals in Batouri have provided care to refugees fleeing violence in the Central African Republic, as it is one of the nearest medical facilities for the refugee camps on the Cameroon-CAR border. An assessment released 4 July 2014 indicated that "in Cameroon, up to 1 out of 3 refugee children from Central African Republic suffer from malnutrition ... The risk of severe acute malnutrition, which can be deadly if left untreated, is particularly high. In the inpatient center of Batouri close to the border, the mortality rate in May exceeded 24 per cent."

== Gallery ==
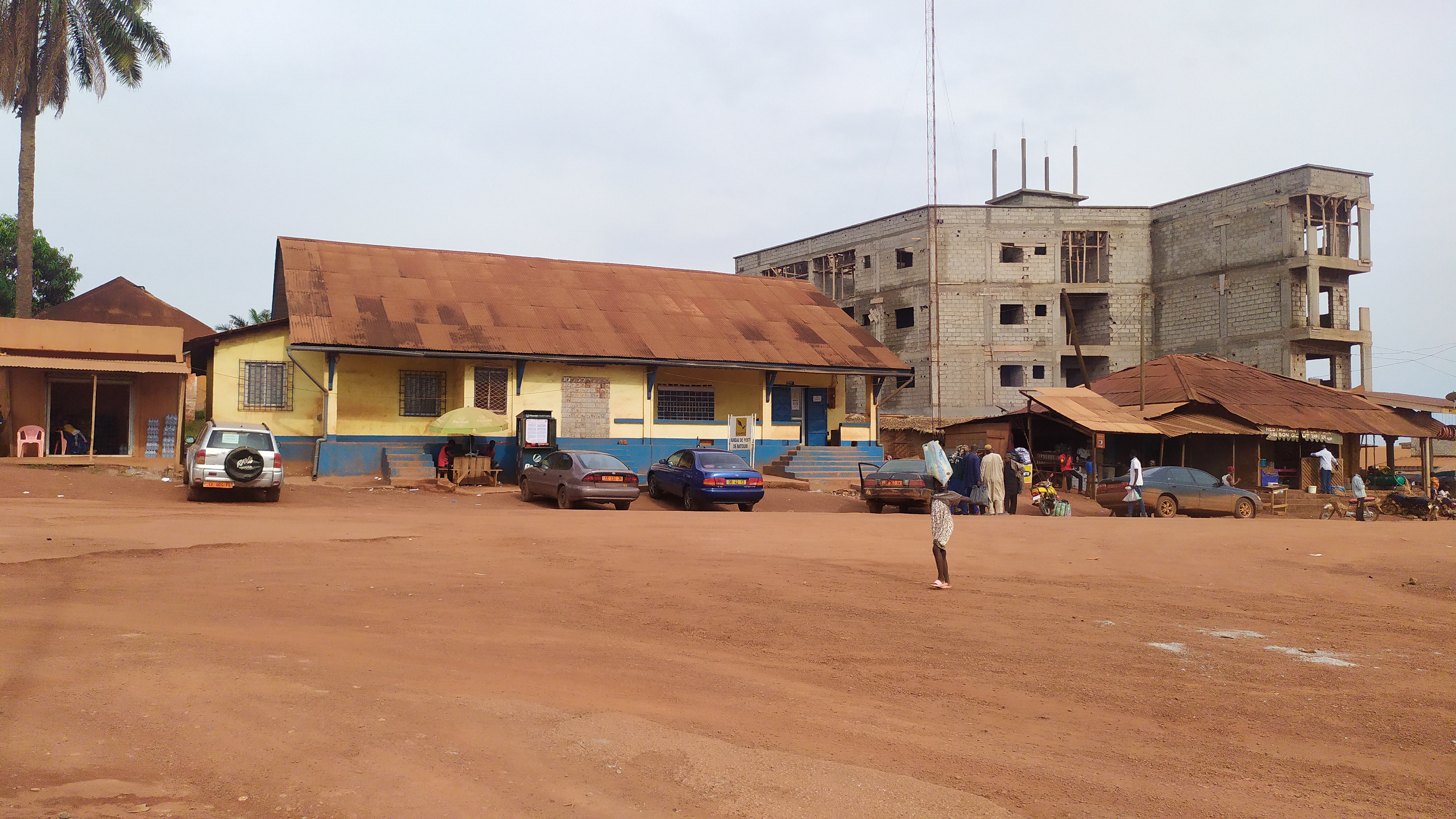
Post office of Batouri

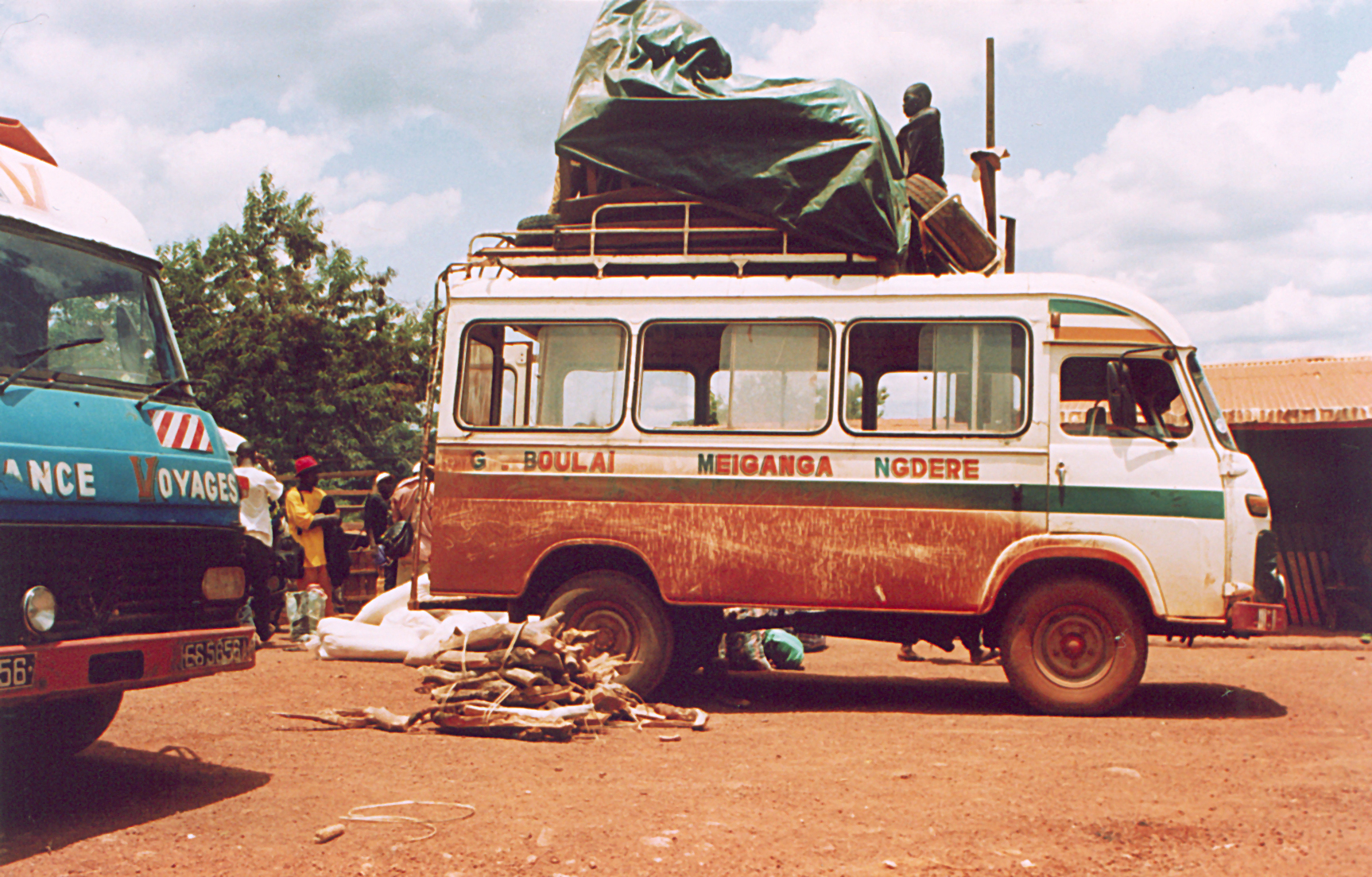
Transportation in Batouri

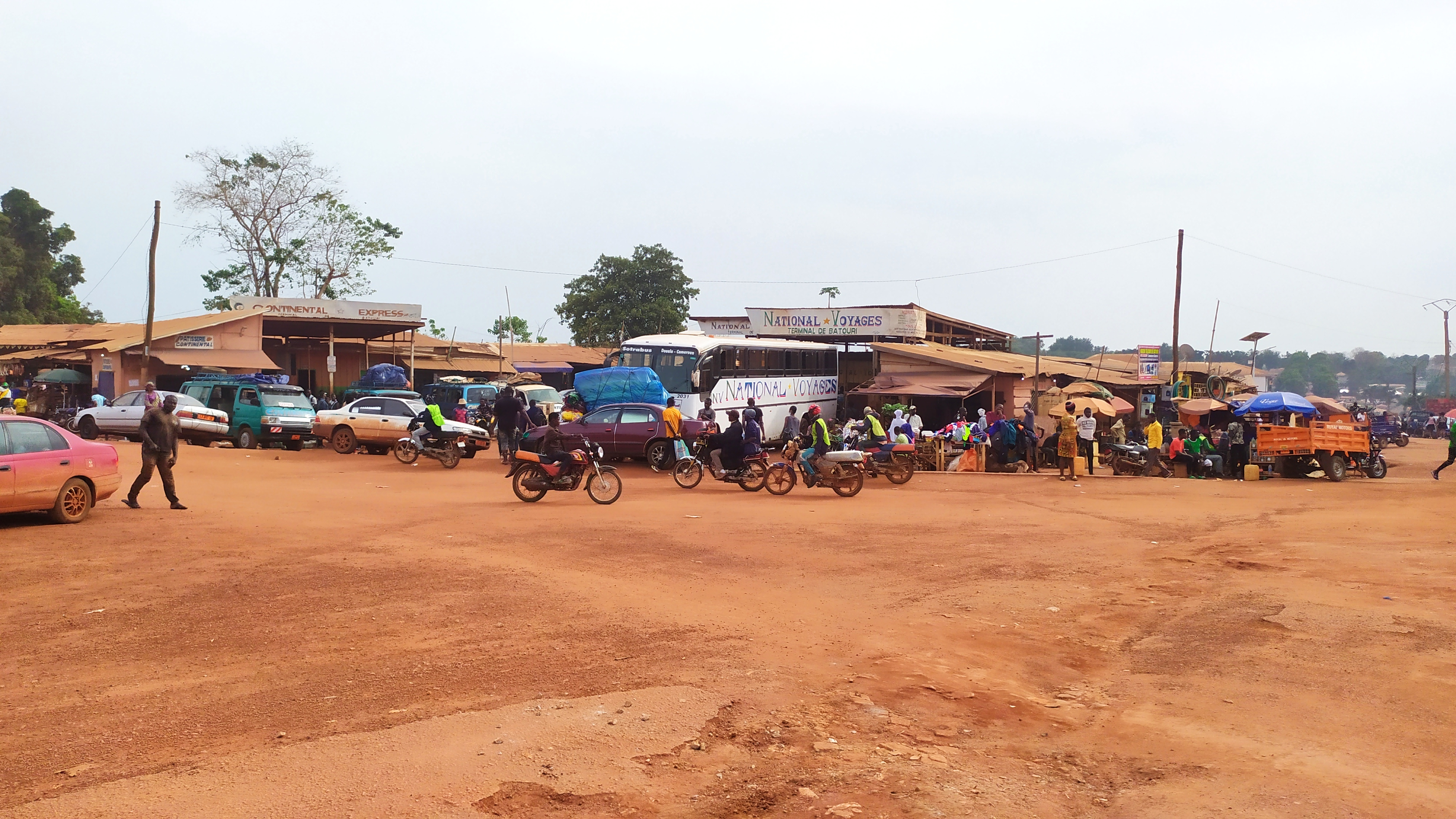
Batouri bus station

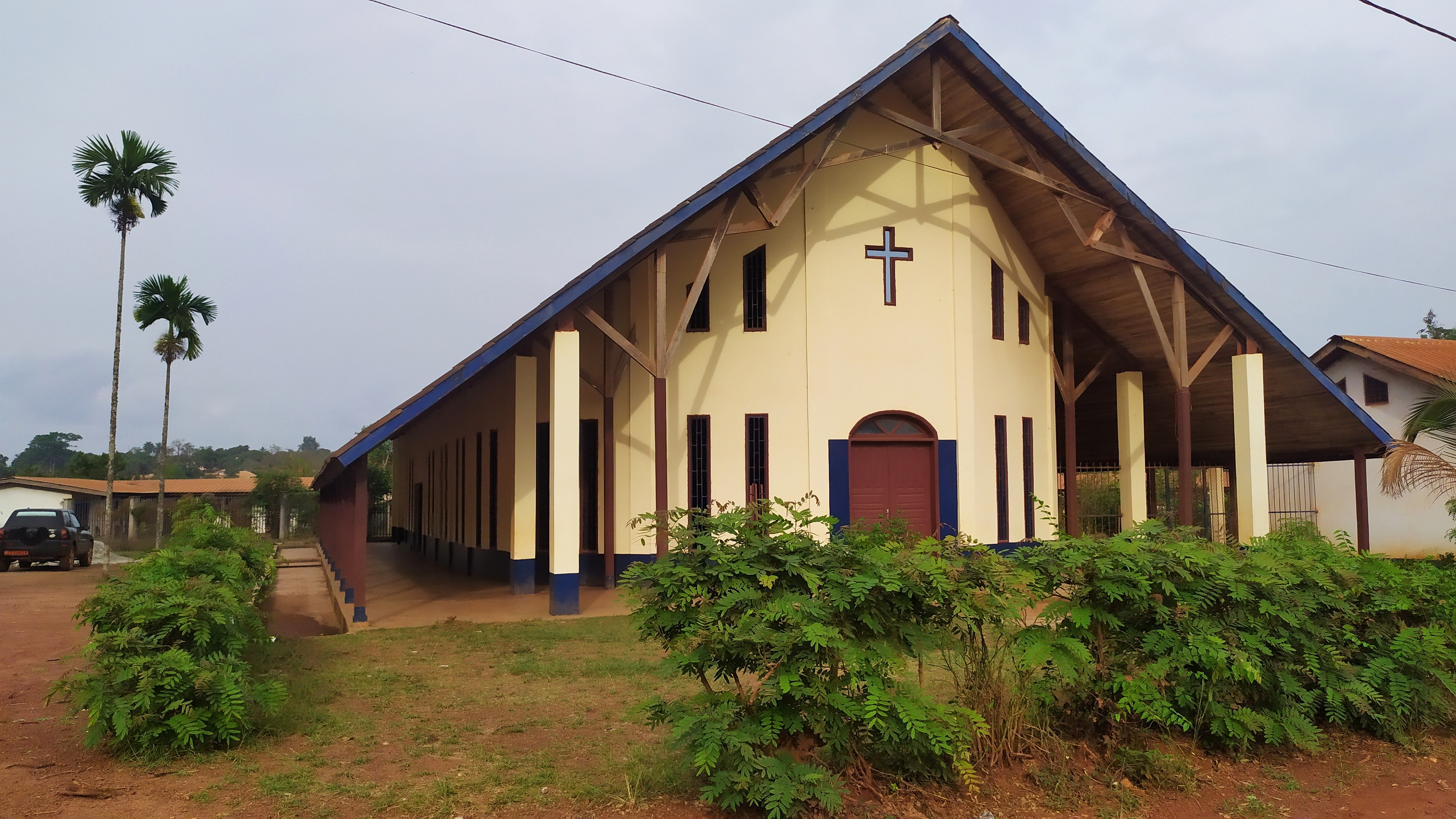
Catholic Church in Batouri
