= Souanké Airport =

- IATA: SOE; ICAO: FCOS

Summary
- Serves: Souanké, Republic of the Congo
- Elevation AMSL: 1,722 ft (525 m)
- Coordinates: 1°59′50″N 14°10′30″E

Map
- Location of airport in the Republic of the Congo

Runways
Direction	Length		Surface
Direction	m	ft	Surface
07/25	1,400	4,593	Grass
- Source: GCM Google Maps

Souanké Airport (IATA: SOE, ICAO: FCOS) is an airport serving the town of Souanké, Republic of the Congo. The runway is 8 kilometres (5.0 mi) southeast of the town.

== See also ==
- List of airports in the Republic of the Congo
- Transport in the Republic of the Congo
