= Gabriel Entcha-Ebia =

Congolese politician (1956–2021)

Gabriel Entcha-Ebia ( 24 August 1956 – 11 December 2021) was a Congolese politician. He served in the government of Congo-Brazzaville as Minister of the Civil Service from 2002 to 2005, as Minister of Justice from 2005 to 2007, and as Minister of Post and Telecommunication in 2007. He was Congo-Brazzaville's Ambassador to Nigeria from 2009 to 2012 and Ambassador to the Central African Republic from 2012 to 2017.

== Career ==
Born at Souanké, Entcha-Ebia studied in Paris and became a magistrate. He was Chief Prosecutor of the Supreme Court from 1998 to 2002. Associated with Jean-Dominique Okemba, a nephew of President Denis Sassou Nguesso and a powerful presidential adviser, Entcha-Ebia was appointed to the government as Minister of the Civil Service and State Reform on 18 August 2002. He was transferred to the post of Minister of Justice and Human Rights on 7 January 2005.

After two years as Minister of Justice, Entcha-Ebia was instead appointed as Minister of Post and Telecommunications and New Communication Technologies on 3 March 2007. However, he remained in that post for less than a year; he was dismissed from the government on 30 December 2007.

Subsequently, Entcha-Ebia was appointed as Ambassador to Nigeria; he presented his credentials to Nigerian President Umaru Musa Yar'Adua on 2 April 2009. He also published a book entitled 800 Days at the Ministry of the Civil Service and State Reform (Huit cents jours au ministère de la Fonction publique et de la Réforme de l'État) in 2009, followed by a book about Congolese state institutions, The Institutions of the Republic of Congo (Les Institutions de la République du Congo), in 2010. He also published Djiha, a literary work that examined child marriage and polygamy; it was published with an introduction by historian Scholastique Dianzinga.

Prior to the sixth extraordinary congress of the ruling Congolese Labour Party (PCT) in July 2011, Entcha-Ebia merged his minor political party, MURC, into the PCT; various other minor parties merged into the PCT at the same time.

After three years as Ambassador to Nigeria, Entcha-Ebia was appointed as Ambassador to the Central African Republic on 3 May 2012. As part of a restructuring of Congolese diplomacy, Entcha-Ebia was one of 16 ambassadors who were dismissed from their posts and recalled on 25 January 2017.

Entcha-Ebia died on 11 December 2021 at Brazzaville University Hospital.
