= Mbilé =

Coordinates: 4.3295°N 14.8369°E

Mbilé, or Mbilé Refugee Camp, is located near the village of Lolo in Kadey Department, East Region, Cameroon.

It is located four hours by bus from the refugee transit center at the border town of Gbiti.

As of March 2014, the aid group Plan International described a young mother at the site saying one meal was provided per day.
