= N'gbala District =

District in the Republic of the Congo

N'gbala
- District
- Interactive map of N'gbala
- Country: Republic of the Congo
- Department: Sangha Department

Area
  - Total: 883 sq mi (2,288 km^{2})

Population (2023 census)
  - Total: 9,019
  - Density: 10.21/sq mi (3.942/km^{2})
- Time zone: UTC+1 (GMT +1)

N'gbala is a district in the Sangha Department of Republic of the Congo.
