= Pikounda District =

Pikounda
- District
- Interactive map of Pikounda
- Coordinates: 0°44′N 16°23′E
- Country: Republic of the Congo
- Department: Sangha Department

Area
  - Total: 3,310 sq mi (8,574 km^{2})

Population (2023 census)
  - Total: 9,418
  - Density: 2.845/sq mi (1.098/km^{2})
- Time zone: UTC+1 (GMT +1)

Pikounda is a district in the Sangha Department of Republic of the Congo.
