= Souanké District =

Coordinates: 1°46′N 13°44′E

Souanké
- District
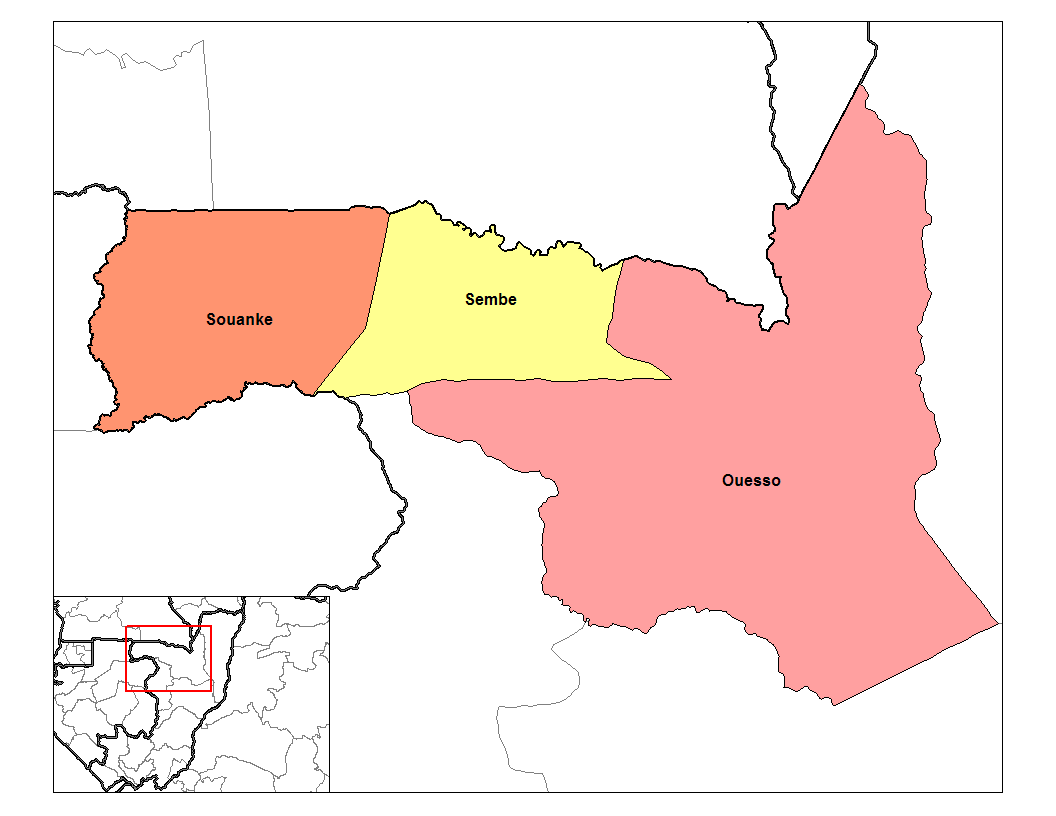
- Souanké District in the region
- Country: Republic of the Congo
- Department: Sangha Department

Area
  - Total: 4,551 sq mi (11,786 km^{2})

Population (2023 census)
  - Total: 25,352
  - Density: 5.5711/sq mi (2.1510/km^{2})
- Time zone: UTC+1 (GMT +1)

Souanké is a district in the Sangha Region of far north-western Republic of the Congo. The capital lies at Souanke.
