= Ouésso District =

Coordinates: 1.61422°N 16.04798°E

Ouésso
- District
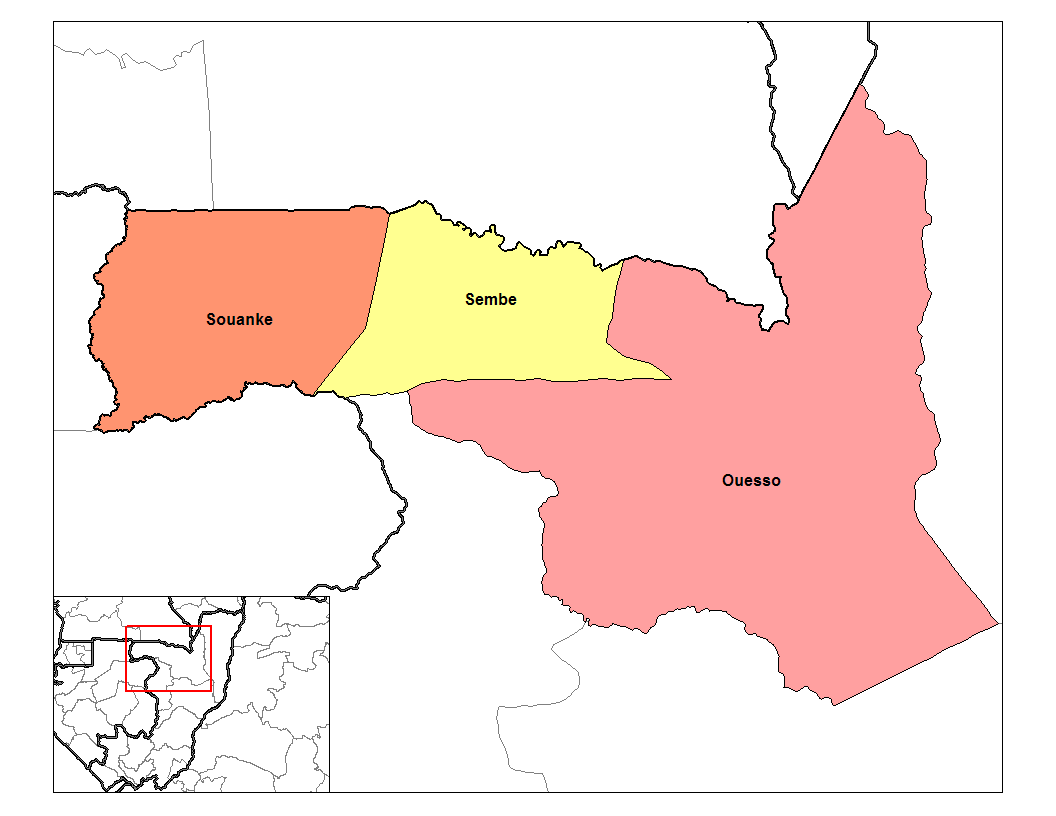
- Ouésso District in the region
- Country: Republic of the Congo
- Department: Sangha Department
- Time zone: UTC+1 (GMT +1)

Ouésso is a district in the Sangha Region of northwestern Republic of the Congo. The capital lies at the Ouésso republic.
