= Mokéko District =

Mokéko
- District
- Interactive map of Mokéko
- Country: Republic of the Congo
- Department: Sangha Department

Area
  - Total: 7,433 sq mi (19,251 km^{2})

Population (2023 census)
  - Total: 108,808
  - Density: 14.639/sq mi (5.6521/km^{2})
- Time zone: UTC+1 (GMT +1)

Mokéko is a district in the Sangha Department of Republic of the Congo.
