= Action Committee for the Defense of Democracy – Youth Movement =

The Action Committee for the Defense of Democracy – Youth Movement (French: Comité d'action pour la défense de la démocratie - Mouvement de jeunesse, CADD-MJ) was a youth organization in the Republic of the Congo, affiliated with the Congolese Labour Party (PCT). It was founded on 28 August 1993 on the initiative of Denis Sassou Nguesso, who was then an opposition leader and is currently the President of the Republic of the Congo. André Okombi Salissa was the President-Coordinator of the Central Council of the CADD-MJ, while Sassou Nguesso was the organization's Honorary President. According to the CADD-MJ, it was the "locomotive of youth organizations in our country".

The CADD-MJ was dissolved in 2013 when the PCT established a new youth organization.
