= Kabo District =

District in Sangha, Republic of the Congo

Kabo
- District
- Location within Republic of the Congo
- Coordinates: 1°56′32″N 16°25′25″E
- Country: Republic of the Congo
- Department: Sangha Department

Area
  - Total: 3,369 sq mi (8,726 km^{2})

Population (2023 census)
  - Total: 38,443
  - Density: 11.41/sq mi (4.406/km^{2})
- Time zone: UTC+1 (GMT +1)

Kabo is a district in the Sangha Department of Republic of the Congo.

The north of the district is the south part of the Nouabalé-Ndoki National Park, one of the 3 parks composing the Sangha Trinational, a forest added as a UNESCO World Heritage Site in 2012.
