= Nguelebok =

Coordinates: 4°16′N 14°03′E

- Commune and town
- Interactive map of Nguelebok
- Country: Cameroon
- Time zone: UTC+1 (WAT)

Nguelebok is a town and commune in Cameroon.

== See also ==
- Communes of Cameroon
