= Ouésso =

Town and commune in Republic of the Congo

- Town and Commune
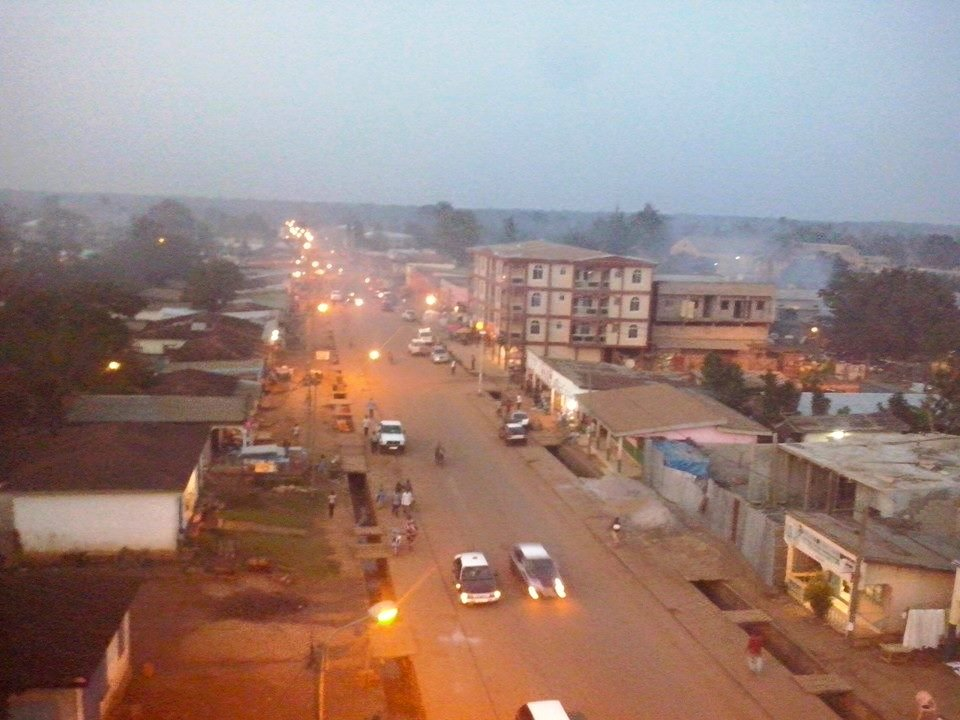
- Ouésso in 2015

- Location within Republic of the Congo
- Coordinates: 1°36′38″N 16°03′05″E
- Country: Republic of the Congo
- Department: Sangha Department
- District: Ouésso District
- Commune: Ouésso

Area
  - Total: 5 km^{2} (1.9 sq mi)
- Elevation: 340 m (1,120 ft)

Population (2023 census)
  - Total: 75,095
  - Density: 15,000/km^{2} (39,000/sq mi)
- Time zone: UTC+01:00 (WAT)

Ouésso (in kikongo: Weso) is a town and commune in the Ouésso District in northern Republic of the Congo at the border of Cameroon, lying on the Sangha River and surrounded by rainforest. It is the capital of the Sangha Department. Its population was 75,095 in 2023, the date of the country's latest official census.

== Economy ==
Ouésso is one of the four special economic zones in the Republic of the Congo. The town's main industries are mining, forestry, agriculture, and wood processing. A power purchase agreement in 2017 with the Gezhouba Group led to the creation of the Liouesso Hydroelectric Power Station, which powers Ouésso.

=== Bushmeat ===
In 1994, the people of Ouésso consumed 7,500 kilograms of bushmeat a week. The most sold animal in the bushmeat market are duikers, but gorillas, monkeys, and elephants were also sold. The meat was transported from Liousesso, a village southwest out of Ouésso, and often on logging trucks from Cameroon. Ouésso lacks enforcement of the bushmeat market.

On 27 October 2016, ivory dealer Hamadou Abbo, and his accomplices, Minda Xavier and Gonock Evounanga Edgard, were each sentenced to 5 years in an Ouésso prison.

In May 2018, Guyvanho, an elephant poacher and ivory trader, was arrested and held in jail in Ouésso. On June 2, 12 days before his trial, he escaped from prison. He was arrested again on 31 May 2019. He attempted to escape, but failed, and was transferred to prison in Brazzaville.

=== Logging ===
Ouésso is a carbon negative area. Between 2001 and 2022, the town had a carbon sink of -8.40.

In 2010, the Parliament of the Republic of the Congo passed a law that gave protection to the country's indigenous pygmy and Baka people and their land. This made logging more difficult.

== Transportation ==
In April 2007, a South Korean consortium proposed to build a railway to Ouésso from Brazzaville, in exchange for a concession to harvest timber.

In 2015, the city's port was extended 100 linear meters. The expansion was funded by the Development Bank of the Central African States, which has a complex in Ouésso.

Ouésso is connected to Brazzaville by a 828 km road titled the "RN2". In 2021, the Sangmelina-Ouésso Road was constructed, which connected Ouésso to Cameroon and removed the need for ferries. The road was 321.5 kilometers long, and costed US$354 million. The ceremony of its completion was attended by Emmanuel Nganou Djoumessi. In 2023, the Chinese National Development and Reform Commission built the Sangha Bridge and the Ouésso-Pokola Road for Ouésso. The groundbreaking ceremony was attended by president Denis Sassou Nguesso.

Ouésso is served by the Ouésso Airport.

== Climate ==
Ouésso has a tropical monsoon climate (Köppen climate classification Am), bordering on a tropical rainforest climate (Af).

Climate data for Ouesso (1991-2020)
Month	Jan	Feb	Mar	Apr	May	Jun	Jul	Aug	Sep	Oct	Nov	Dec	Year
Mean daily maximum °C (°F)	31.4 (88.5)	32.4 (90.3)	32.5 (90.5)	32.0 (89.6)	31.2 (88.2)	30.2 (86.4)	29.5 (85.1)	29.8 (85.6)	30.4 (86.7)	30.7 (87.3)	30.7 (87.3)	30.7 (87.3)	31.0 (87.8)
Daily mean °C (°F)	25.2 (77.4)	26.1 (79.0)	26.3 (79.3)	26.2 (79.2)	25.9 (78.6)	25.2 (77.4)	24.7 (76.5)	24.8 (76.6)	24.7 (76.5)	24.8 (76.6)	24.9 (76.8)	25.1 (77.2)	25.3 (77.5)
Mean daily minimum °C (°F)	19.7 (67.5)	20.5 (68.9)	21.2 (70.2)	21.4 (70.5)	21.2 (70.2)	20.8 (69.4)	20.6 (69.1)	20.5 (68.9)	20.4 (68.7)	20.6 (69.1)	—	20.2 (68.4)	21.1 (70.0)
Average precipitation mm (inches)	57.2 (2.25)	65.6 (2.58)	116.2 (4.57)	128.1 (5.04)	171.9 (6.77)	149.0 (5.87)	116.7 (4.59)	164.6 (6.48)	228.6 (9.00)	227.8 (8.97)	140.2 (5.52)	67.8 (2.67)	1,633.7 (64.31)
Source: NOAA

== Notable people ==
- Jane Vialle (1906–1953) French journalist, politician and women's rights activist
- Stéphane Maurice Bongho-Nouarra (1937–2007), prime minister of the Republic of the Congo
