= Ngoura =

Coordinates: 4.3977°N 14.5641°E

- Commune and town
- Interactive map of Ngoura
- Country: Cameroon
- Time zone: UTC+1 (WAT)

Ngoura is a town and commune in Cameroon.

== See also ==
- Communes of Cameroon
