= Moungali =

Arrondissement in the Republic of Congo

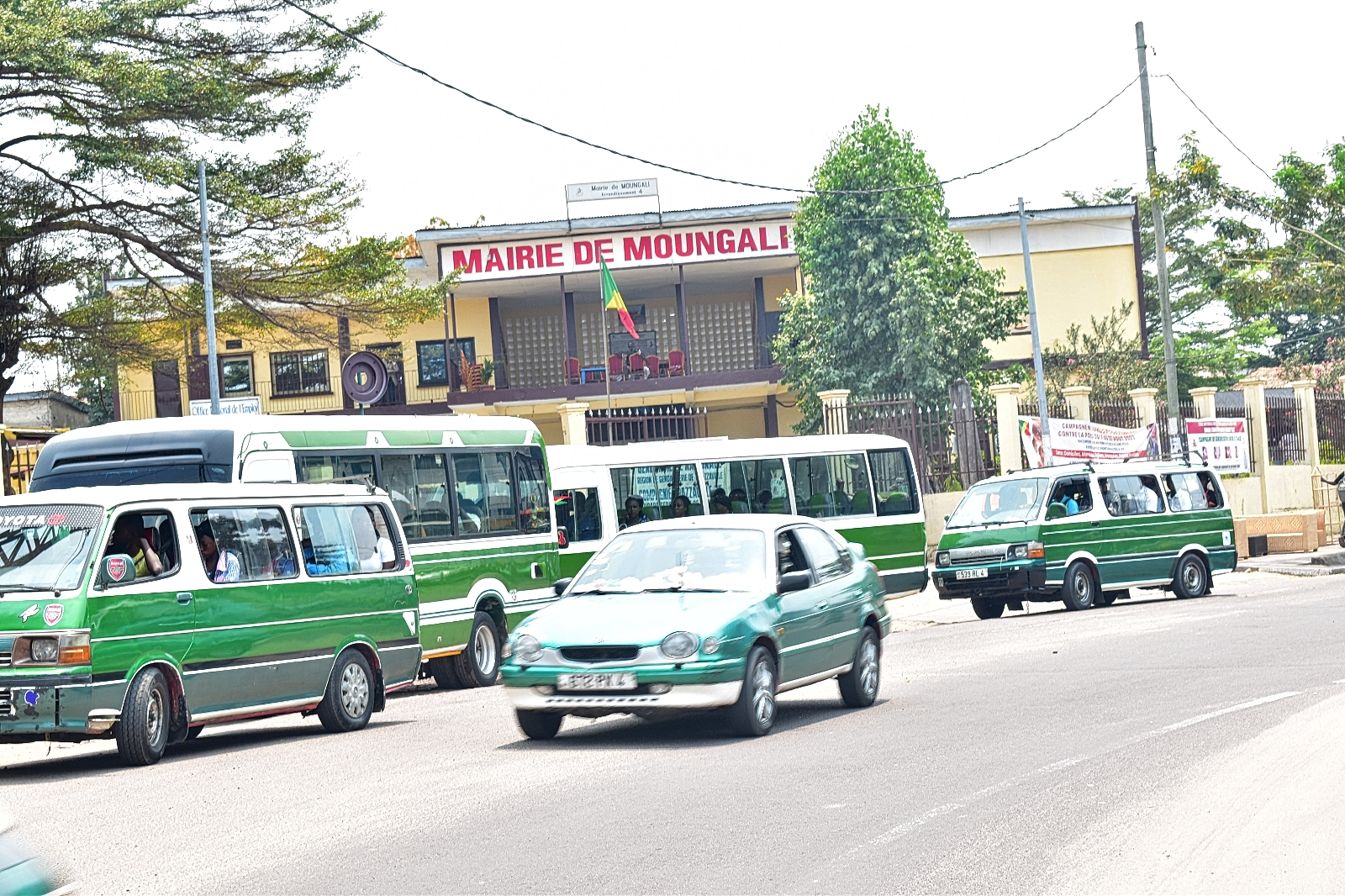
Moungali neighborhood

Moungali is one of the arrondissements of Brazzaville, capital of Republic of Congo.
