= Élise Thérèse Gamassa =

Congolese politician (1942–2023)

- Born: Élise Thérèse Mboumba; 3 February 1942; Sibiti
- Died: 23 September 2023 (aged 81); Longjumeau

Élise Thérèze Gamassa, née M'Boumba (February 3, 1942 – September 23, 2023) was a Congolese politician who campaigned for women's rights in the Congo.

== Teaching career ==
Thérèze Gamassa came from a modest family in Sibiti. She studied at the teacher training college in Mouyondzi (Bouenza) and then worked at the École des cadres in Brazzaville from 1962 to 1974, then at the École Félix-Tchikaya in Pointe-Noire until 1976. She inspired vocations in young people, especially girls.

As a young woman, she joined the Union générale des étudiants du Congo (UGEC).

== Political career ==
=== President of UFPC ===
After the revolution of August 13–15, 1963, Gamassa presided over the Pan-African Women's Union (UFPA), which soon disappeared.

She then joined the Revolutionary Union of Congolese Women (URFC), where she was in charge of the education department, which enabled her to support the cause of women. Then, in support of the February 5 movement in 1979, she became president of the movement, where she served for 12 years until 1984.

In July 1991, Pascal Lissouba created the Pan-African Union for Social Democracy (UPADS) and offered the presidency and honorary presidency to her husband Pascal Gamassa.

=== President of the PCT ===
From 1984 to 1991, Gamassa was a member of the Central Committee of the Congolese Party of Labour (PCT). This enabled her to pursue her mission as General Secretary of the URFC.

In 1990, after the 4th PCT Congress, she joined the PCT's political bureau, where she campaigned for women's rights in the Congo.

On January 19, 2010, she was appointed to the organizing committee for the fiftieth anniversary of the Republic of the Congo's independence.

From July 28 to 31, 2010, she coordinated the National Women's Forum in Brazzaville, following which she published the book La place et le rôle des femmes dans la société congolaise de 1960 à 2010 : bilan et perspectives with Jeanne Dambendzet and Scholastique Dianzinga in Paris, published by L'Harmattan. The aim of the book is to provide the country's women with the tools they need to educate the next generation, cope with everyday life and fight for their rights.

Gamassa's dedication has led to comparisons with the figure of Mother Dorcas, as her commitment to her six children was as much political as familial. She is also remembered as a woman who did her "duty to speak out," in the words of Martial De-Paul Ikounga.

== Publications ==
- Élise Thérèse Gamassa; Jeanne Dambendzet; Scholastique Dianzinga (2010). La place et le rôle des femmes dans la société congolaise de 1960 à 2010 : bilan et perspectives (in French). Paris: L'Harmattan. ISBN 978-2-296-54336-2.

== Decorations ==
- October 6, 2023: a tribute was paid to her in the presence of the administrator-mayor of Komono, PCT central committee member Hortance Bouanga and the President of the Republic of Congo, Denis Sassou Nguesso.
- February 4, 1988: elevated to the title of Grand Officer of the Congolese Order of Merit, after having been made Commander by decree n°88/080
