= Cameroon Red Cross Society =

National Red Cross Society

- Founded: 1960
- Type: Non-profit organisation
- Purpose: Humanitarian Aid
- Location: Cameroon
- Affiliations: International Committee of the Red Cross; International Federation of Red Cross and Red Crescent Societies

The Cameroon Red Cross Society (CRC, French: Croix-Rouge camerounaise) was established on 30 April 1960. It has its headquarters in Yaoundé and is headed by Léonie Cécile.
