= Sembé =

Village in the Republic of the Congo

- Village
- Location in the Republic of the Congo
- Coordinates: 1°39′19″N 14°34′15″E
- Country: Republic of the Congo
- Department: Sangha
- District: Sembé

Population (2023)
  - Total: 9,416

Sembé is a village located in the Sangha Department of the Republic of the Congo. It is the administrative seat of the Sembé District.

== Geography ==
Sembé is located about 1,193 km from Accra and about 1,581 km from Lagos.

In 2010, Sembé was covered near completely in tree cover, with 868 kilohectares. By 2022, the village lost 1.35 kilohectares, equivalent to 988 kilotons of carbon dioxide.

== Economy ==
Sembé is home to the only permanent illegal bushmeat market. In 2007, a road from Cameroon to Sembé was opened, which allowed for the bushmeat trade. To stop the trade, an anti-poaching program was created, which employed 10 guards.

In 2019, a 160 kilometer road connecting Kette to Sembé was completed. The road costed 100 billion CFA franc, and the opening ceremony was attended by president Denis Sassou Nguesso.
