= Marien Ngouabi University =

State-funded university in Brazzaville, the Republic of Congo

- Université Marien Ngouabi (French)
- Type: State-funded university
- Established: 4 December 1971; 54 years ago
- President: Gontron Ondzotto
- Dean: Blaise Irene Atipo-Ibara
- Students: 20,000 (2012)
- Location: Brazzaville, Republic of the Congo; 4.27659°S 15.25004°E
- Campus: Urban
- Nickname: UMNG
- Website: University website

Marien Ngouabi University (French: Université Marien Ngouabi, UMNG) is the only state-funded university in the Republic of the Congo. It is located in the nation's capital Brazzaville.

== History ==
Marien Ngouabi University building

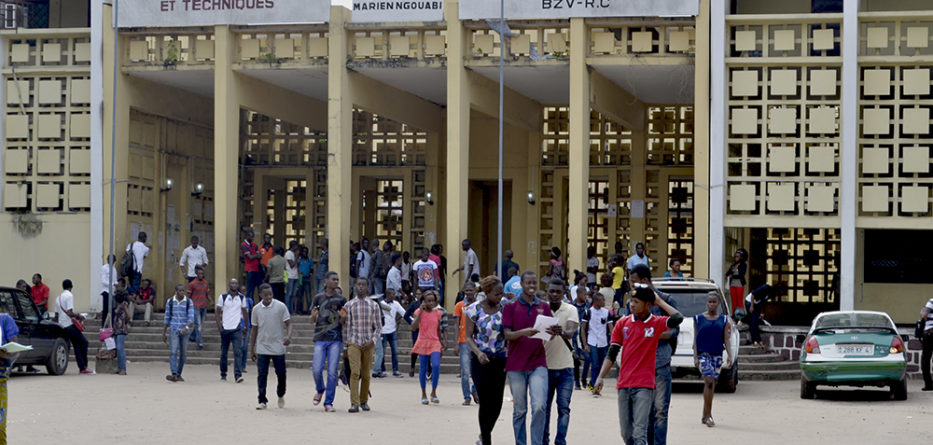
Faculty of Law

The University of Brazzaville was founded on 4 December 1971 amidst desires to assert the country's sovereignty. Following the assassination of President Marien Ngouabi on 18 March 1977, the university was renamed in his honor on 28 July 1977. The University of Brazzaville was a continuation of the Foundation for Higher Education in Central Africa (1961), which in turn developed out of the Center for Higher Education in Brazzaville (1959). It has a number of separate campuses, each with individual libraries (ten different ones in 1993), in Brazzaville and the rest of the country. The largest and most important library is what is called the Central Library, the Library of the School of Humanities and of the Advanced Institute of Economic, Juridical, Administrative, and Management Sciences (1993 nomenclature); this library originates in the library of French Equatorial Africa's government and the Alliance Française.

Initially, the university had four institutions and 3,000 students; by 2012 it had grown to 11 institutions and some 20,000 students.

=== Institutions ===
As of 2012:

- Faculty of Law
- Faculty of Economic Sciences
- Faculty of Letters and Human Sciences
- Faculty of Sciences
- Faculty of Health Sciences
- Superior Institute of Management
- Institute of Rural Development
- Superior Institute of Physical and Sports Education
- National School of Administration and the Magistracy
- National School of Advanced Studies
- National Polytechnic School

== Alumni ==
- Edith Lucie Bongo (1964–2009), physician and former First Lady of Gabon
- Scholastique Dianzinga, professor and specialist in women's history
- Delphine Djiraibe (born 1960), lawyer and human rights activist
- Mandingha Kosso Moanda, academic
- Pierre M'Pelé, public health and tropical disease specialist
- Jean Rosaire Ibara, Minister of Health of the Republic of Congo
