= Kadey =

Department of East Province, Cameroon

- Department
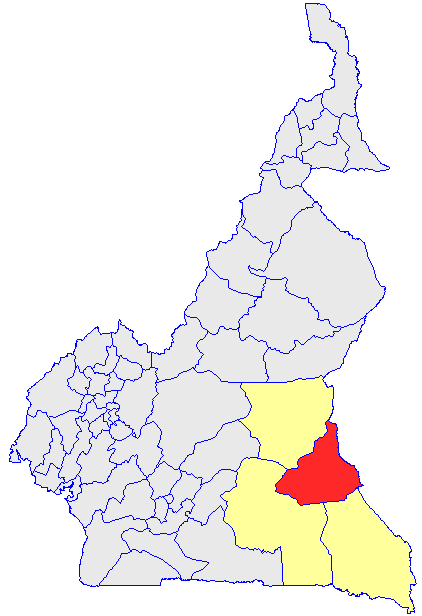
- Department location in Cameroon

- Location within Cameroon Location within Africa
- Country: Cameroon
- Province: East Province
- Capital: Batouri

Area
  - Total: 15,884 km^{2} (6,133 sq mi)

Population (2001)
  - Total: 192,927
  - Density: 12.146/km^{2} (31.458/sq mi)
- Time zone: UTC+1 (WAT)

Kadey (also spelled Kadéï, Kadéi, Kadeï or Kadei) is a department of East Province in Cameroon. The department covers an area of 15,884 km^{2} and as of 2001 had a total population of 192,927. The capital of the department lies at Batouri.

== Subdivisions ==
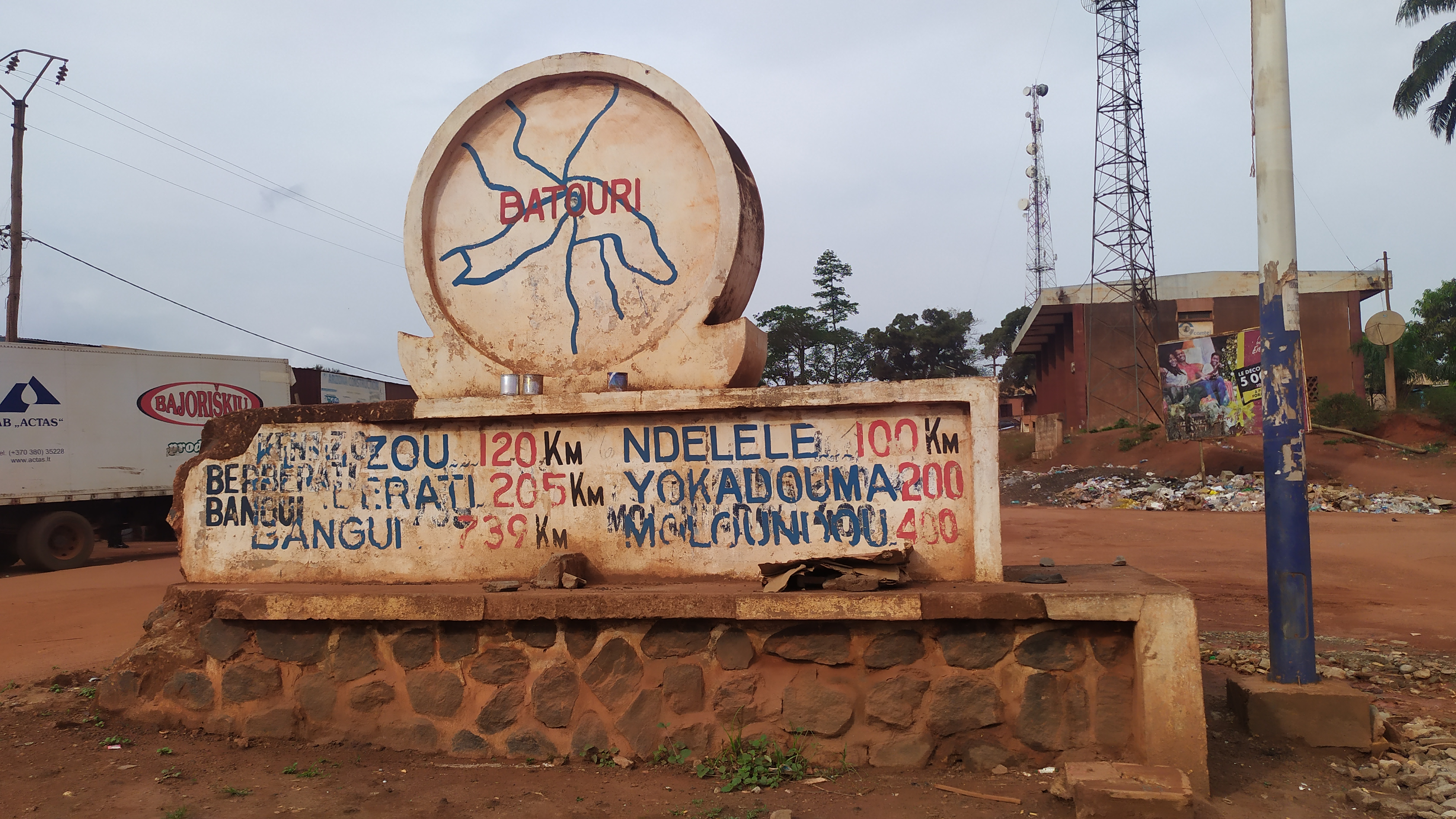
Downtown Batouri, capital of the Kadey departement

The department is divided administratively into 7 communes and in turn into villages.

=== Communes ===
- Batouri
- Kentzou
- Kette
- Mbang
- Ndelele
- Nguelebok
- Ouli

== See also ==
- Kadéï River
