= Kette =

Town and commune in Cameroon

- Commune and town
- Location in Cameroon
- Coordinates: 4.9000°N 14.5500°E
- Country: Cameroon
- Time zone: UTC+1 (WAT)

Kette is a town and commune in Cameroon.

In 2019, a 160 kilometer road connecting Kette to Sembé was completed. The road cost 100 billion CFA franc, and the opening ceremony was attended by president Denis Sassou Nguesso.

== See also ==
- Communes of Cameroon
