= Sangha Department (Republic of the Congo) =

Department of the Republic of the Congo

Coordinates: 2.0261101°N 14.8881120°E

Sangha
- Department
- Sangha, department of the Republic of the Congo
- Country: Republic of the Congo
- Capital: Ouesso

Area
  - Total: 55,800 km^{2} (21,500 sq mi)

Population (2023 census)
  - Total: 209,701
  - Density: 3.76/km^{2} (9.73/sq mi)
- HDI (2021): 0.482 low · 8th of 12

Sangha is a department of the Republic of the Congo in the northern part of the country. It borders the departments of Cuvette, Cuvette-Ouest, and Likouala, and internationally, Cameroon, Gabon and the Central African Republic. The regional capital is Ouésso. Principal towns include Sembé and Souanké.

== Administrative divisions ==
Sangha Department is divided into one commune and six districts:

=== Districts ===
1. Mokéko District
2. Sembé District
3. Souanké District
4. Pikounda District
5. N'gbala District
6. Kabo District

=== Communes ===
1. Ouésso Commune
