= Mining in the Republic of the Congo =

- Position of Republic of the Congo within Africa highlighted

Location
- Country: Republic of the Congo

Regulatory authority
- Authority: Ministry of Mines and Geology
- Website: Congo Portal

Production
- Commodity: Oil - ▲310,000 barrels/day; Gas - ▲1,1bcm; Gold - ??; Iron Ore -
- Value: ▲ ??
- Employees: ▲60,000
- Year: 2011

Oil and gas dominate the extraction industries of the Republic of the Congo (French: République du Congo), also referred to as Congo-Brazzaville. The petroleum industry accounted for 89% of the country’s exports in 2010. Among African crude oil producers in 2010, The Congo ranked seventh. Nearly all of the country's hydrocarbons were produced off-shore. The minerals sector is administered by the Department of Mines and Geology. Presently no major mining activities are underway, although there are some small-scale domestic operations. However, the country does have numerous large-scale undeveloped resources. The country has recently attracted a strong influx of international companies seeking to tap into the vast mineral wealth.

As of 2012:

- 32 prospecting licenses granted to 28 companies
- 42 exploration licenses granted to 26 companies
- 7 mining licenses granted to companies

== Natural resources ==
- Iron ore
- Magnesium
- Diamonds
- Potash
- Phosphate
- Copper
- Lead
- Zinc
- Gold

Significant Resources
Mineral	Deposit	Owner
Iron Ore	Mayoko	Congo Mining Ltd
Iron Ore	Badondo	Congo Mining Ltd
Iron Ore	Mayoko	Exxaro
Iron Ore	Oyabi	Equamineral Holdings Ltd
Iron Ore	Avima	Core
Iron Ore	Zanaga	Xstrata
Iron Ore	Nabeba	Sundance Resources
Diamonds	Lepandza	Mexivada
Phosphate	Hinda	Cominco Resources
Potash	Kouilou	MagIndustries
Potash	Sintoukola	Elemental
Gold	Mousondji	Compagnie Minière du Chaillu

== History ==
Railways of the Republic of the Congo

=== Colonial ===
During the colonial period, the Republic of the Congo saw small-scale mechanized mining activities. During the 1960s French exploration companies identified vast evaporative zones containing sylvinite and carnallite mineralisation covering the Congo Basin.

In 1959 COMILOG commenced manganese extraction operations near the town of Moanda in Gabon, just across the Congolese border. To be able to export the manganese COMILOG built a 285 km railway line from the Congo town of Mbinda south to where it join the Congo-Ocean Railway. Ultimately trains go on to the coastal port of Pointe Noire. Although manganese is no longer moved by rail, the COMILOG line remains in use, with weekly passenger service. Conveniently, the COMIL line runs through Mayoko near the high-grade iron ore, which any mining syndicate that might want to set up new commercial operations would surely find convenient.

=== 1960-1985 ===
From independence (1960) to 1985 industrial expansion in the mining sector was limited to the potash company, Makolo (previously Holle) and the polymetals of Mfouati District, Boko-Songho District and Mindouli. Artisanal mining was confined to exploitation of precious metals, notably gold in Kellé, Kakamoeka District, Mayoko District and in Souanké.

Oil production intensified during its boom period, 1975 to 1984, leading to a large increase in government revenue. This increase in revenue brought about profound changes in the structure of exports and domestic output.

=== 1985-1999 ===
From 1985 to 1999, the Congo became structurally indebted as it struggled with political and economic difficulty despite the significant inflow of oil revenue. International investment slowed and mining virtually ceased. By 2000, gold and lime were the only minerals still being extracted.

=== 2000 onwards ===
In 2000 the government began to show a genuine commitment to developing a mining sector, and it is a central part of the country’s economic diversification program – Le Chemin d’Avenir (Path Forward).

In the past, the mining sector has been rife with corruption, which led to a suspension in 2004 of the RoC from the Kimberly Process. However, corruption has been significantly reduced and the ROC was later reinstated to the Kimberly Process after it made improvements in monitoring procedures for its mining sector.

In 2005, the government introduced a new mining code, to replace existing outdated legislation. The mining code offers prospective miners attractive and flexible terms to encourage the development of mining projects.

To support the economic diversification strategy, the government created four special economic zones, including the Pointe-Noire Special Economic Zone, located on the coast at Point Indienne, in support of developing petrochemical, iron and steel, and mining activities. In 2008 the Bureau d’Expertise, d’Evaluation et de Certification des Substances Minérales Précieuses (Bureau for Assay, Evaluation and Certification of Precious Minerals) was established with the aim of facilitating control over the scattered artisanal alluvial diamond extraction operations.

Sassou, the current president, has repeatedly stated he wants to build a lucrative mining industry, unlike that of the neighboring DRC, which is plagued by corruption and mismanagement. After the September 2009 elections the government formed the new Ministry of Mines and Geology, Ministère des Mines et de la Géologie, with Pierre Oba as Minister.

In early 2010, the Canadian exploration company NGEx Resources Inc was granted two exploration licences for copper-lead-zinc, over the Reneville and Kingouala areas.

Hanlong initiated a bid for Sundance Resources in July 2012. The bid initially valued Sundance at US$1.5 billion but was later revised to US$1.3 billion. Sundance's main asset is the Nabeba iron ore deposit, part of the Mbalam Project together with the Mbaraga deposit in neighbouring Cameroon. In February the National Development and Reform Commission of the People's Republic of China (NDRC) extended provisional approval of the bid to July 2013. On 8 April Sundance announced termination of the takeover bid after Hanlong failed to meet the funding conditions.

In December 2011, the Ministry of Mining and Geology was invited to London, to receive second place in the "Country of the Year" prize, after Liberia. In January of the following year, Exxaro made a US $349 million takeover offer for African Iron. In December 2012, the ministerial council approved the recommendation of the ministry for mines to grant the Nabeba mining permit.

MagMinerals Inc., a division of MagIndustries Corp. of Canada, continued financing negotiations for the development of Mengo exploitation permit and the Kouilou potash processing facility. In February, TSC Capital Ltd. of Taiwan withdrew its offer to acquire up to 55% of MagIndustries. In April, Evergreen Resources Holding Ltd. of the United Kingdom, (a subsidiary of Evergreen Industries Holding Group Company, Ltd. of China), agree to acquire MagIndustries. The friendly takeover was completed in July. MagMinerals Inc., a division of MagIndustriesCorp). of Canada, continued negotiations to secure financing for the development of the Mengo exploitation permit and the Kouilou potash processing facility. In April, Evergreen Resources Holding Ltd. of the United Kingdom, a subsidiary of China's Evergreen Industries Holding Group Company, Ltd. MagMaterials projected that the new ownership would make it easier to get finding from Chinese banks like the Export-Import Bank of China. Despite some challenges, the Republic of the Congo retains its strong economic growth with enormous investment potential. The country has considerable and varied natural resource wealth, a strategic location with an ISPS-certified port, a capital city across the river from the enormous DRC market, and a relative dearth of competition. The government is eager to support international investment and is also now largely debt-free.

As of 2012, seven mining permits have been granted:

- A potash permit to MagMinerals Potasse du Congo (MPC) in the Pointe Noire zone (Mengo);
- Two polymetal mining permits to the Société de Recherche et d’Exploitation Minière (SOREMI) in BokoSongho and Yanga-Koubenza in the Mfouati/BokoSongho zone
- Two polymetal mining permits in Mindouli-Mpassa to the company LULU.
- Two iron ore mining permits, one to Core Mining's Avima deposit and the other to Nebaba, held by Sundance.

== Geology ==
Precambrian rocks of the Archean to Neoproterozoic Age form the central part of the Republic of the Congo, overlain by continental Cretaceous and Tertiary Sediments. The East is made up of Quaternary alluvial sedimentation. The Coastal basin is made up of Cretaceous to Quaternary marine sediments, including phosphatic sequences and evaporites. The Precambrian Mayombe Range boards the basin to the East. The Neoproterozoic West Congolian Supergroup occurs in the Nyanga syncline with feldspathic sediments overlain by dolomites, cherts and dolomitic limestone with stromatolites.

Alluvial diamonds have been found, near the border with the Central African Republic border.

A giant granitoid massif known as the Cahillu Massif extends with NS foliation through south-central Congo. At Mayoko a relict greenstone belt occurs, with sub-vertical banded iron formation. Two large high iron deposits have been located, Mayoko-Moussondji (Congo Mining) and Mayoko-Lekoumou (Exxaro). Iron is hosted within 'Chapeau de Fer' or hats of iron, a highly weathered iron-rich metamorphic rock with some parts covered by high-grade hematite crust.

Iron ore has also been discovered in the northwestern part of the Archaean Congo Craton (Sangha region), within the Chaillu Block. This is a metamorphosed complex of Tonalite- Trondhjemite-Granite gneisses in which linear belts of metavolcaniclastic rocks and BIF occur.

== Mining code ==
In April 2005, the Republic of the Congo introduced a new Mining Code under Law4-2005. The new mining code offers attractive terms and establishes a clear regime from exploration and exploitation agreements. The mining code allows foreign entities to control mining operations. This represented the first major overhaul to the mining code since 1965.

The mining code also gives, upon granting a mining licence, the Congolese state a 10% non-contributing stake in all mining projects. The government has the right to purchase additional equity, but to date has never excised this right.

=== Royalties and taxes ===
Royalties are calculated on the export value of the resource based on the following schedule.

- Ferrous and non-ferrous metals (including phosphate) taxed at 3%
- Precious metals and stones taxed at 5%
- Mineral and thermal waters taxed at 1%

=== Company profit taxes ===
- 20% for quarry operations
- 30% for mining operations

Article 98 of the Mining Code requires the state and the holder of an exploitation licence to enter into a mining agreement (“Convention”) with the Congolese government which clearly establishes the rights and obligations of each party, and grants concessions such as tax-free periods. Once an exploitation licence for the Project has been granted and following negotiation and cooperation of advisers, the licence holder and the government will agree the terms of the convention. The terms of the convention typically require the state to undertake, as soon as possible after signing the convention, to submit the convention to the Congolese Parliament for ratification and adoption as a state law (“Ratification Law”), and no later than three months from the date of its presentation to Parliament.

== Oil and gas ==
In the late 1970s, Congo emerged as a significant oil producer, with production expanding considerably during the 1990s. However, by the turn of the century, production began to decline as existing oil fields reached maturity in 2001. However, since 2008 oil production has increased every year as a result of several new projects coming online, mainly Congo’s first deep-water field, Moho Bilondo. The Congo is the fifth largest oil producer in sub-Saharan Africa.

According to the 2012 BP Statistical Energy Survey, Congo had proved oil reserves of 1.94 billion barrels at the end of 2011, equivalent to 17.9 years of current production and 0.11% of the world's reserves. The accompanying downstream oil industry is an important element in the country's economy. The oil industry is predominantly run by foreign companies and is centred on the coastal city of Pointe Noire where the Congolaise de Raffinage (Coraf) operates the 21,000 bpd Pointe Noire refinery. The refinery has been out of commission for four years and in 2013 had only recently resumed operations.

Congo holds the fifth-largest proved reserves of natural gas in the Sub-Saharan Africa, at 3.2 Tcf, A majority of natural gas, around 65%, is re-injected and 21% flared.
