= Moanda =

Moanda may refer to

- Moanda, Democratic Republic of the Congo, a town in the Democratic Republic of the Congo
- Moanda, Gabon, a town in Gabon
  - Moanda railway station, a train station in Moanda, Gabon
  - Moanda Airport, an airport in Moanda, Gabon
- Moanda (crater), a crater on Mars
