= Mayoko, Republic of the Congo =

Village in Niari, Congo

Coordinates: 02°17′04″S 12°48′30″E

Mayoko is a town in the Mayoko District, Niari Department, east of the Republic of the Congo.

== Transport ==
It is served by a station on the 1,067 mm (3 ft 6 in) Mbinda branch of the Congo-Ocean Railway.

== Mining ==
Iron ore deposits are located near the town and the railway. Congo Mining and Exxaro both hold exploration permits nearby.

== See also ==
- Railway stations in Congo
