= Moutamba =

Town in Niari, Republic of Congo

Coordinates: 02°58′16″S 12°35′57″E

Moutamba is a town that is situated in Mossendjo, Niari, Republic of Congo.

== Transport ==
It is served by a station on the Mbinda branch of the Congo-Ocean Railway.

== See also ==
- Railway stations in Congo
