= Loutété =

- Location in the Republic of the Congo
- Coordinates: 4°17′50″S 13°51′20″E
- Country: Republic of the Congo
- Department: Bouenza Department
- District: Mfouati District
- Elevation: 232 m (761 ft)

Population (2023 census)
  - Total: 26,176

Loutété (can also be written as Lutete) is a small town in southeastern Republic of the Congo.

== Transport ==
It is served by a station on the 1,067 mm (3 ft 6 in) narrow gauge Congo-Ocean Railway.

== Industry ==
It has a cement works.

== See also ==
- Railway stations in Congo
