= Yanga derailment =

2010 railway incident in the Republic of the Congo

Details
- Date: 21 June 2010
- Location: Yanga
- Country: Republic of the Congo
- Line: Brazzaville – Pointe Noire
- Operator: Chemin de Fer Congo-Ocean
- Incident type: Derailment

Statistics
- Trains: 1
- Deaths: At least 76
- Injured: At least 745
- Damage: Hundreds of missing people, "severe" material damage

The Yanga derailment occurred on 21 June 2010 when a train traveling between Brazzaville and Pointe Noire in the Republic of the Congo was derailed and plunged into a ravine. At least 60 people were initially reported to have been killed and hundreds disappeared with the death toll expected to rise further. The death toll had risen to 76 people and the injury toll had risen to 745 by 23 June 2010.

The derailment compares with a similar incident which killed 100 people and injured 300 others in the Republic of the Congo's deadliest such incident in the country's history back in September 1991. A chronological list of rail accidents since 2002 provided by The Daily Telegraph suggests this is the deadliest rail disaster since 28 April 2008 when at least 70 people were killed in China.

== Accident ==
On 21 June 2010, a train operated by Chemin de Fer Congo-Océan (CFCO) derailed at Yanga, between Bilingi and Tchitondi, some 60 kilometres (37 mi) from Pointe Noire. Four carriages were derailed. At least 51 people were reported killed at the time, with dozens more injured.

The train was en route from Pointe-Noire to Brazzaville at the time. Four wagons fell down into a ravine. Casualties and corpses were carried to the relevant location. 16 people were left in a critical state of physical danger. Photographs of the wounded show multiple limb injuries and wheelchair-using patients. Family members gathered at Pointe Noire and Dolisie railway stations to seek news of their loved ones. The material damage was said to be "severe".

By 23 June 2010, the death toll had risen to 76 people and the injury toll had risen to 745.

== Cause ==
No cause for the crash was immediately established, although excessive speed was blamed by the government. The train was rounding a bend at the time.

== Response ==
The military and people from the Red Cross dashed to the area to offer their assistance to the stricken passengers. President Denis Sassou Nguesso met with senior members of his administration after the incident.

Three days of national mourning were declared by the Republic of the Congo's government.

Funerals which had resulted from the incident were paid for by the government, according to an official statement, and mourning commenced in earnest the following Saturday.
