= La Gazelle =

Overview
- Locale: Republic of the Congo
- Transit type: inter-city rail
- Number of lines: 1
- Number of stations: 11

Operation
- Began operation: 2012
- Operator: Congo–Ocean Railway

Technical
- System length: 502 km (312 mi)
- Track gauge: 1,067 mm (3 ft 6 in)

La Gazelle travels between Brazzaville and Pointe-Noire

La Gazelle is the name of a long-distance passenger train service operated by the Congo–Ocean Railway. The train was introduced in 2012.

== Route ==
The train runs between Brazzaville and Pointe-Noire and stops at 9 intermediate stations along the route. As of January 2014 the journey was scheduled to take either 14 or 16 hours depending on whether the service was overnight or during the day.

== Rolling stock ==
The train uses Korean manufactured passenger railway cars which include a restaurant and bar car and has its own engine which supplies the cars with electricity for air conditioning and power outlets.
