= Economy of the Republic of the Congo =

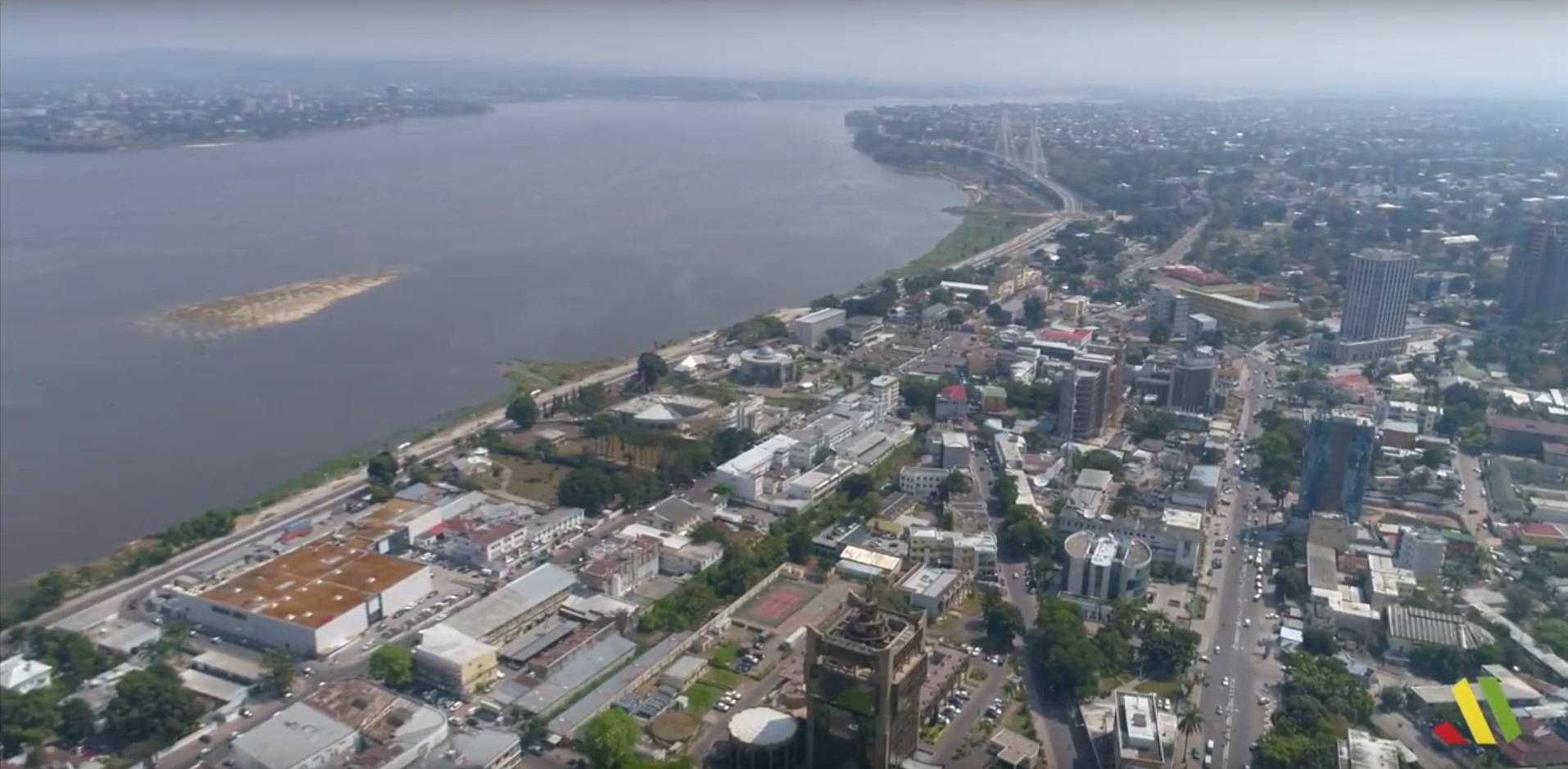
- Brazzaville, the economic center of the Republic of Congo.
- Currency: Central African CFA Franc (XOF)
- Fixed exchange rates: 1 USD = 511.4 XOF (2012)
- Fiscal year: calendar year
- Trade organisations: AU, WTO, AfCFTA, ECCAS
- Country group: Developing/Emerging; Lower-middle income economy

Statistics
- Population: ▲5,244,363 (2018)
- GDP: ▲$17.028 billion (nominal, 2026 est.); ▲$44.754 billion (PPP, 2024 est.)
- GDP rank: 142th (nominal, 2026); 138th (PPP, 2026)
- GDP growth: 2.8% (2024f); ▲3.7% (2025f)
- GDP per capita: ▲$2,554 (nominal, 2026 est.); ▲$6,712 (PPP, 2026 est.)
- GDP per capita rank: 150th (nominal, 2026); 142th (PPP, 2026)
- GDP per capita growth: 0.1% (2024)
- GDP by sector: agriculture: 4.9%; industry: 69.8%; services: 25.3%; (2016)
- Inflation (CPI): 1.8% (2020 est.)
- Population below national poverty line: 40.9% (2011); 61.3% on less than $3.20/day (2011)
- Gini coefficient: 48.9 high (2011)
- Human Development Index: ▲0.649 medium (2023) (138rd); ▲0.426 low IHDI (2023)
- Labour force: ▲2,173,950 (2019); 48.4% employment rate (2009)
- Labour force by occupation: N/A
- Unemployment: 53% (2012)
- Main industries: petroleum extraction, cement, lumber, brewing, sugar, palm oil, soap, flour, cigarettes

External
- Exports: $12.35 billion (2012)
- Export goods: petroleum, lumber, plywood, sugar, cocoa, coffee, diamonds
- Main export partners: United Arab Emirates 26%; China 16.6%; Greece 7.87%; Vietnam 7.73% (2021)
- Imports: $4.751 billion (2012)
- Import goods: capital equipment, construction materials, foodstuffs
- Main import partners: China 20.4%; France 9.28%; Belgium 4.88%; India 4.65% (2021)
- Gross external debt: 4.225 billion (2012)

Public finance
- Revenue: $8.05 billion (2012)
- Spending: $5.93 billion (2012)
- All values, unless otherwise stated, are in US dollars.

The Republic of the Congo has a developing economy. It is a mixture of subsistence hunting and agriculture, an industrial sector based largely on petroleum extraction and support services. Government spending is characterized by budget problems and overstaffing. Petroleum has supplanted forestry as the mainstay of the economy, providing a major share of government revenues and exports. The nation has increasingly converted natural gas to electricity rather than burning it, improving energy efficiency.

== Historical overview ==
Earlier in the 1990s, Congo's major employer was the state bureaucracy, which had a payroll of 80,000, which is enormous for a country of Congo's size. The World Bank and other international financial institutions pressured Congo to institute sweeping civil service reforms to reduce the size of the state bureaucracy and pare back a civil service payroll that amounted to more than 20% of GDP in 1993. The effort to cut back began in 1994 with a 50% devaluation that cut the payroll in half in dollar terms and by a mid-year reduction of nearly 8,000 in civil service employment and resulted in inflation of 61%. Inflation has since subsided.

Between 1994 and 1996, the Congolese economy underwent a difficult transition. The prospects for building the foundation of a healthy economy, however, were better than at any time in the previous 15 years. Congo took a number of measures to liberalize its economy, including reforming the tax, investment, labor, and hydrocarbon codes. Planned privatizations of key parastatals, primarily telecommunications and transportation monopolies, were launched to help improve a dilapidated and unreliable infrastructure. To build on the momentum achieved during the two-year period, the International Monetary Fund (IMF) approved a three-year ESAF economic program in June 1996.

By the end of 1996, Congo had made substantial progress in various areas targeted for reform. It made significant strides toward macroeconomic stabilization through improving public finances and restructuring external debt. This change was accompanied by improvements in the structure of expenditures, with a reduction in personnel expenditures. Further, Congo benefited from debt restructuring from a Paris Club agreement in July 1996.

This reform program came to a halt, however, in early June 1997 when war broke out. Denis Sassou-Nguesso, who returned to power when the war ended in October 1997, publicly expressed interest in moving forward on economic reforms and privatization and in renewing cooperation with international financial institutions. However, economic progress was badly hurt by slumping oil prices in 1998, which worsened the Republic of the Congo's budget deficit. A second blow was the resumption of armed conflict in December 1998.

Congo's economic prospects remain largely dependent on the country's ability to establish political stability and democratic rule. The World Bank is considering Congo for post-conflict assistance. Priorities will be in reconstruction, basic services, infrastructure, and utilities.

Congo and the United States ratified a bilateral investment treaty designed to facilitate and protect foreign investment. The country also adopted a new investment code intended to attract foreign capital. Despite this, Congo's investment climate is not considered favorable, offering few meaningful incentives. High costs for labor, energy, raw materials, and transportation; a restrictive labor code; low productivity and high production costs; militant labor unions; and an inadequate transportation infrastructure are among the factors discouraging investment. The recent political instability, war damage, and looting also undermined investor confidence. As a result, Congo has little American investment outside of the oil sector.

In recent years, the Republic's economic growth has slowed because of the 2014–2016 fall in oil prices.

== Sectors ==
=== Agriculture ===
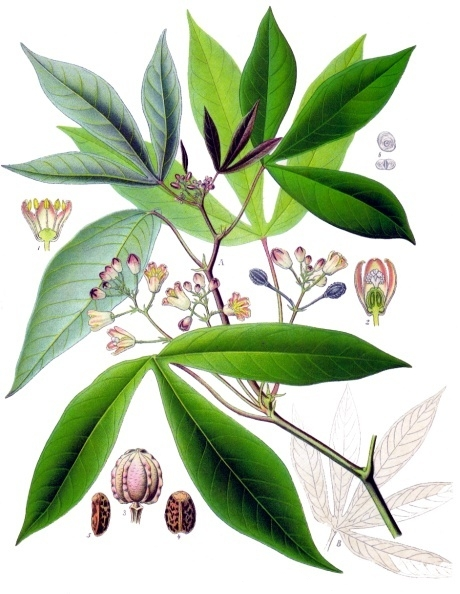
Cassava is an important food crop in the Republic of Congo.

Agriculture in the Republic of the Congo is mostly at the subsistence level. Self-sufficiency in food production is yet to be achieved. Cassava (manioc) is the basic food crop everywhere in the country except in the southern region, where bananas and plantains are prevalent. Among the cash crops, the most important are sugarcane and tobacco, though palm kernels, cacao, and coffee are also cultivated to some extent. The main consumption crops are bananas, manioc, peanuts, plantains, sugarcane, and yams. Subsistence agriculture is the country's most significant employer, and it is one of the three most important economic sectors. With the government's efforts since 1987, agricultural production has increased due to "abolishing state marketing boards, freeing prices, launching new agricultural credit institutions and closing down most state farms". The Niari Valley in the south is a notable agricultural area.

=== Mining ===
Oil and gas dominate the extraction industries of the Republic of the Congo (French: République du Congo), also referred to as Congo-Brazzaville. The petroleum industry accounted for 89% of the country’s exports in 2010. Among African crude oil producers in 2010, The Congo ranked seventh. Nearly all of the country's hydrocarbons were produced off-shore. The minerals sector is administered by the Department of Mines and Geology. Presently no major mining activities are underway, although there are some small-scale domestic operations. However, the country does have numerous large-scale undeveloped resources. The country has recently attracted a strong influx of international companies seeking to tap into the vast mineral wealth.

As of 2012:

- 32 prospecting licenses granted to 28 companies
- 42 exploration licenses granted to 26 companies
- 7 mining licenses granted to companies

=== Petroleum ===
The Congo's growing petroleum sector is by far the country's major revenue earner. In the early 1980s, rapidly rising oil revenues enabled the government to finance large-scale development projects with GDP growth averaging 5% annually, one of the highest rates in Africa. However, the government has mortgaged a substantial portion of its oil earnings, contributing to the government's shortage of revenues. The Congolese oil sector is dominated by the French parastatal oil company Total, which accounts for 70% of the country's annual oil production. In second position is the Italian oil firm Εni. Chevron, independent CMS Nomeco, and ExxonMobil are among the American companies active in petroleum exploration or production. Congo is member of the OPEC cartel.

Congo plans to use the auction to grow its small oil industry, which only produces about 25,000 barrels a day from a project in the west of the country run by France's Perenco SA. The process has drawn criticism from environmental groups for offering blocks that overlap with Congo's peatlands, which are among the world's most important carbon sinks.

== Foreign trade procedures ==
International cargo shipped to or from the Republic of the Congo must be covered by a cargo tracking note (bordereau de suivi de la cargaison, BSC), issued by the Conseil Congolais des Chargeurs. The document was instituted by ministerial order 1033/MTMMM-CAB of 14 May 2008, and its electronic form (BESC) was made a customs requirement by a directive of 11 April 2014.

== Macroeconomic indicators ==
GDP per capita development in the Republic of Congo, 1950 to 2018

The following table shows the main economic indicators in 1980–2024. Inflation below 5% is in green.

Year	GDP (in bil. US$ PPP)	GDP per capita (in US$ PPP)	GDP (in bil. US$ nominal)	GDP growth (real)	Inflation (in Percent)	Government debt (Percentage of GDP)
1980	2.8	1,623	2.2	▲12.7%	▲7.3%	n/a
1985	▲4.0	▲2,029	▼1.3	▲2.4%	▲3.5%	n/a
1990	▲7.4	▲3,084	▲2.9	▲1.0%	▲0.3%	0%
1995	▲9.3	▲3,388	▼2.5	▲4.0%	▲6.3%	0%
2000	▲12.1	▲3,870	▲3.6	▲11.8%	▲0.5%	▲145%
2005	▲14.3	▲3,897	▲6.7	▲9.2%	▲2.5%	▼100%
2006	▲15.9	▲4,178	▲8.1	▲8.0%	▲4.7%	▼95%
2007	▼15.3	▼3,863	▲8.8	▼ −6.6%	▲2.6%	▼94%
2008	▲16.6	▲4,049	▲11.6	▲6.3%	▲6.0%	▼70%
2009	▲18.6	▲4,369	▼9.7	▲11.6%	▲4.3%	▲84%
2010	▲20.7	▲4,664	▲13.2	▲9.9%	▲0.4%	▼43%
2011	▲21.6	▲4,710	▲15.7	▲2.2%	▲1.8%	▼34%
2012	▲24.2	▲5,130	▲17.7	▲9.9%	▲5.0%	▼30%
2013	▲24.4	▼5,057	▲18.0	▼ −0.7%	▲4.6%	▲34%
2014	▲26.5	▲5,361	▼17.9	▲6.7%	▲0.9%	▲42%
2015	▼25.8	▼5,095	▼11.9	▼ −3.6%	▲3.2%	▲74%
2016	▼24.8	▼4,772	▼10.9	▼ −5.0%	▲3.2%	▲85%
2017	▼23.8	▼4,477	▲11.8	▼ −5.6%	▲0.4%	▲88%
2018	▲30.7	▲5,636	▲14.8	▼ −2.3%	▲1.2%	▼71%
2019	▲32.1	▲5,767	▼14.0	▲1.1%	▲0.4%	▲78%
2020	▼27.4	▼4,813	▼11.5	▼ −6.3%	▲1.4%	▲103%
2021	▲33.3	▲5,707	▲13.4	▲1.1%	▲2.0%	▼98%
2022	▲36.3	▲6,084	▲14.0	▲1.8%	▲3.0%	▼92%
2023	▲38.4	▲6,252	▲14.2	▲2.0%	▲4.3%	▲99%
2024	▲40.4	▲6,404	▲15.0	▲2.8%	▲4.0%	▼93%

== Other economic statistics ==
Exports of the Republic of the Congo by product category (2019) Chemical products Transportation Machines Mineral products Plastics and rubbers Metals Foodstuffs Precious metals Textiles Instruments Animal products Vegetable products Paper goods Footwear and headwear Miscellaneous Stone and glass Wood products Animal and vegetable bi-products Animal hides Arts and antiques Weapons

GDP: purchasing power parity – $18.48 billion (2011 est.)

GDP – real growth rate: 4.5% (2011 est.)

GDP – per capita: purchasing power parity – $4,600 (2011 est.)

GDP – composition by sector:
agriculture: 4.2% (2011 est.)
industry: 70.7% (2011 est.)
services: 25.1% (2011 est.)

Household income or consumption by percentage share:
lowest 10%: 2.1% (2005)
highest 10%: 37.1% (2005)

Inflation rate (consumer prices): 6% (2011 est.)

Labor force: 1.514 million (2007)

Ease of Doing Business Rank: 181st

Budget:
revenues: $6.938 billion (2011 est.)
expenditures: $3.535 billion (2011 est.)

Industries: petroleum extraction, cement, lumber, brewing, sugar, palm oil, soap, flour, cigarettes

Industrial production growth rate: 12% (2010 est.)

Electricity – production: 452 million kWh (2008 est.)

Electricity – consumption: 534 million kWh (2008 est.)

Electricity – exports: 0 kWh (2009 est.)

Electricity – imports: 436 million kWh (2008 est.)

Agriculture – products: cassava (tapioca), sugar, rice, maize, peanuts, vegetables, coffee, cocoa, forest products

Exports: $12.38 billion (2011 est.) Exports – commodities: petroleum, lumber, plywood, sugar, Cocoa bean, coffee, diamonds

Exports – partners: China 37.9%, United States 20%, Australia 6.2%, France 6.0%, Spain 4.8%, Italy 4.3%, Netherlands 4.3% (2011)

Imports: $4.917 billion (2011 est.)

Imports – commodities: capital equipment, construction materials, foodstuffs

Imports – partners: France 17.3%, China 12.6%, India 9.5%, Italy 7.5%, Brazil 7.3%, United States 5.8% (2011)

Debt – external: $4.955 billion (2011 est.)

Currency: 1 Communaute Financiere Africaine franc (CFAF) = 100 centimes

Fiscal year: calendar year

Public debt as percentage of GDP: 61.2% (2017)

== See also ==
- Republic of the Congo
- Mining in the Republic of Congo
- Transport in the Republic of the Congo
- List of companies based in the Republic of the Congo
- United Nations Economic Commission for Africa
