= Compagnie minière de l'Ogooué =

Mining and processing company based in Gabon

COMILOG
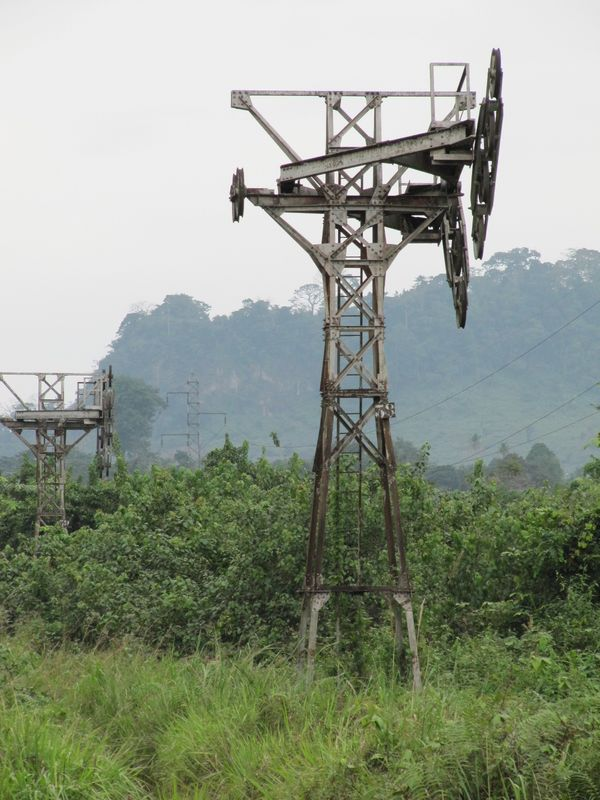
- Abandoned cableway pylons
- Native name: Compagnie minière de l'Ogooué
- Industry: Mining
- Founded: October 1953; 72 years ago
- Headquarters: Moanda, Gabon
- Website: www.eramet-comilog.com

The Compagnie minière de l'Ogooué, or COMILOG, is a manganese mining and processing company based in Moanda, Gabon. It is a subsidiary of the French metallurgical group Eramet. The company is the world's second largest producer of manganese ore. At first the ore was carried by a cableway to the border with the Republic of the Congo, then by rail to the sea at Pointe-Noire. In the 1980s a railway was built to carry the ore through Gabon to the sea near Libreville.

== Ore deposits ==
Locations in Gabon / Congo Republic

Manganese was first reported in the Franceville region in 1895. Further discoveries were made in 1934, 1944 and 1945. Systematic exploration began in 1951. In 1951 a joint mission of the Bureau Minier de la France d'Outre-Mer and U.S. Steel found a large deposit estimated at over 100 million tonnes of marketable ore. The ore is high quality with a manganese content of 45–50%.

The deposits are found in five plateaus around Moanda in the Haut-Ogooué Province and were formed by supergene enrichment of Precambrian sediments. The Bangombe plateau has a 19 square kilometres (7.3 sq mi) mineralized area, and was the first to be exploited. The Okuama plateau has a 13 square kilometres (5.0 sq mi) mineralized area. There are smaller deposits in the Bafoula, Massengo and Yeye plateaus.

The lowest level of the ore zone is a 0.1 to 0.5 metres (3.9 in to 1 ft 7.7 in) layer of massive manganese oxides and hydroxides with some manganese carbonate (rhodochrosite). Above this is the main ore zone, a 3 to 9 metres (9.8 to 29.5 ft) layer of plates of similar minerals between bands of clay, silica and iron bearing material. The main manganese minerals are pyrolusite, manganite, polianite, nsutite and psilomelane. Ramsdellite, hausmannite and cryptomelane are also found. Above the main ore zone is a 5 to 6 metres (16 to 20 ft) layer rich in alumina and iron-rich manganiferous pisolites, with a manganese content of 15%.

== Initial development ==
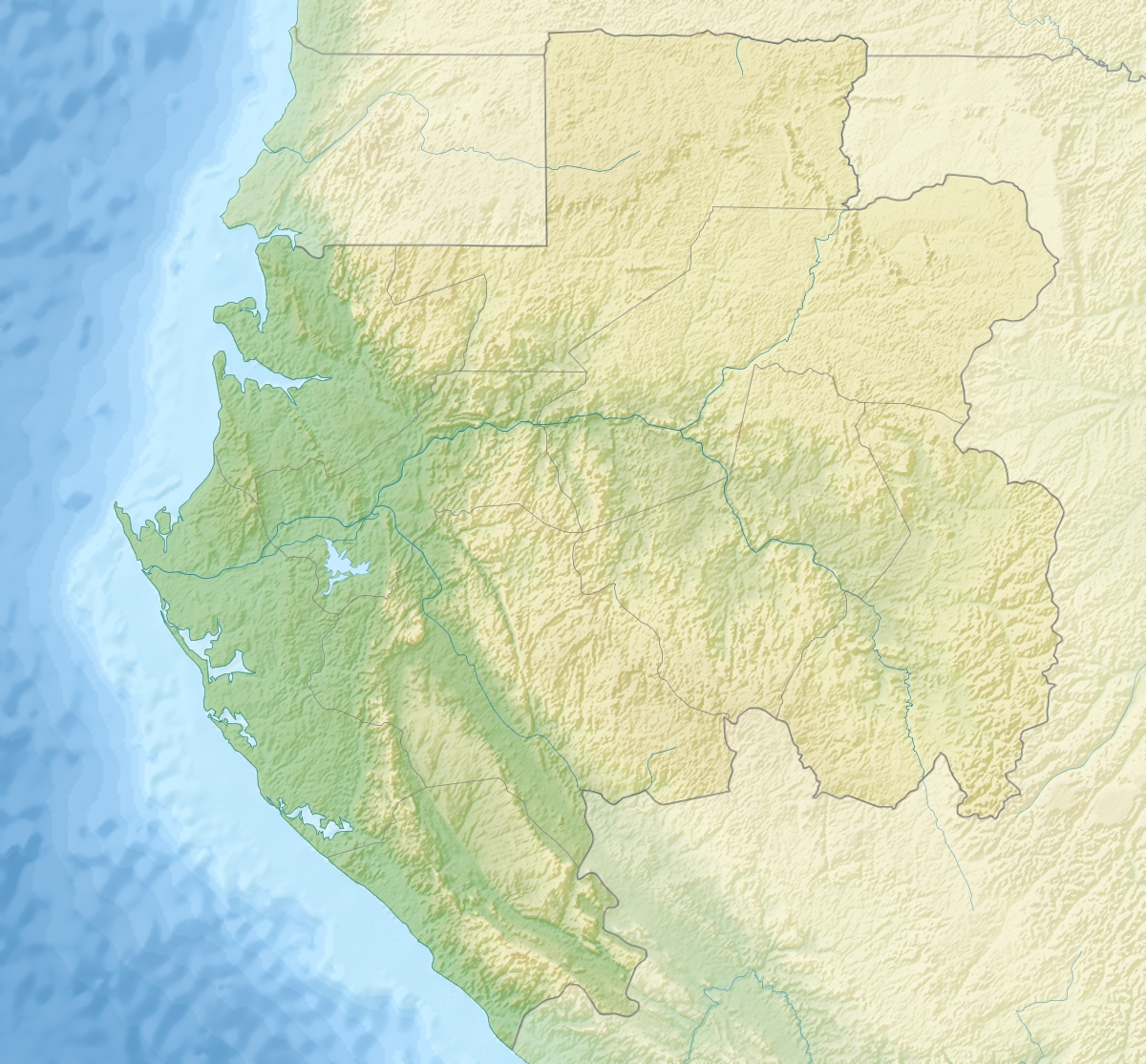
Locations in Gabon

COMILOG was established on 24 April 1953 to mine a deposit estimated at 50 million tons of manganese ore in Gabon, with US Steel owning almost half the company. The ore deposit was over 350 kilometres (220 mi) from the sea, separated from it by rugged mountainous terrain. The solution was to carry the ore by cableway from Moanda to Mbinda in the Republic of the Congo, and then by a new railway line via Makabana to Monto Bello. From there the existing Congo–Ocean Railway (CFCO: Chemin de Fer Congo-Océan) would link to the port of Pointe-Noire. The 76 kilometres (47 mi) aerial cableway was the second longest in the world (the longest being Norsjö aerial tramway in Sweden). 286 kilometres (178 mi) of track were built between 1959 and 1962 from Mbinda to the CFCO tracks at a location 200 kilometres (120 mi) from Pointe-Noire.

On the cableway the ore bins were spaced along the cable 54 metres (177 ft) apart. The bins discharged 150 tons of ore per hour into a 25,000 ton storage tank at Mbinda. From there a conveyor belt carried the ore to railway wagons. The 1,470 hp locomotives each pulled 40 wagons with 49 tons of load, and could carry from 600,000 to 700,000 tons annually. Space was allocated to COMILOG at the port of Point-Noire for storage and embarkation of the ore. The ore was carried on a network of conveyor belts that routed it to or from a storage facility with about 160,000 tons capacity, or directed it to ships at the rate of 1,000 tons per hour.

Henri Lafond, the first president of COMILOG, was responsible for equipping the mine and for building the cableway, railway and facilities for ore handling at Pointe-Noire. The US Steel team participated in this work. Construction of the factories and the COMILOG Cableway were complete in 1959. The first ore was shipped from Moanda on 2 October 1962. The new mine, railway and port provided regular jobs to many people, and opened up land for settlement. Shipment of COMILOG ores became an important component of the Congoloese economy.

== Trans-Gabon railway and port ==
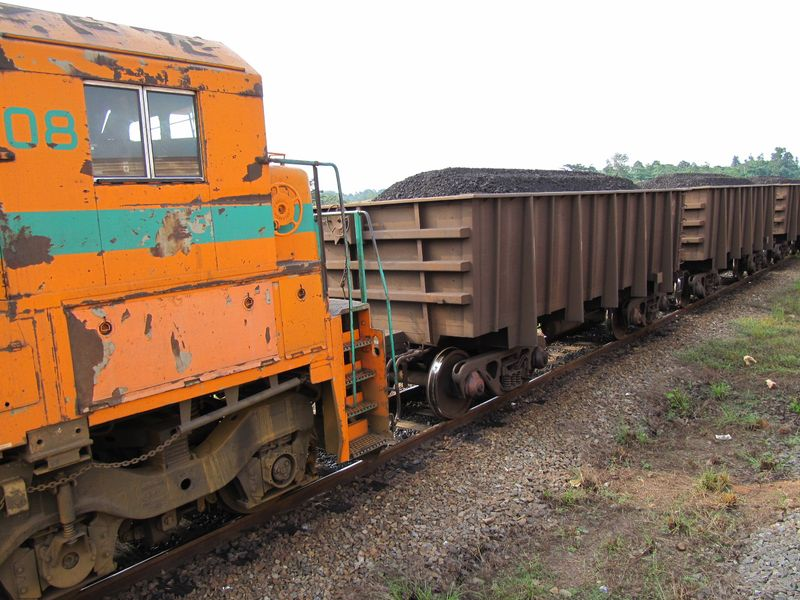
Ore trucks on the Trans-Gabon Railway

Annual shipment volumes were at first limited to 2.7 million tons, the capacity of the cableway. Gabon experienced an economic expansion between 1973 and 1985 based on exports of petroleum, manganese, uranium and timber. The government used some of the proceeds to build the Trans-Gabon Railway between 1974 and 1986. It connected the new port being built at Owendo to Franceville on the upper Ogooué River and opened up the forests and mines of the interior. The only railway line in Gabon, it runs for 640 kilometres (400 mi) from Libreville to Franceville.

The new railway was used to carry ore from Moanda to the port of Owendo near Libreville. In 1985 six MaK G 1203 BB locomotives with Cummins engines were built by Maschinenbau Kiel for the OCTRA (Office du chemin de fer transgabonais) railway company. In 2003 the tracks were upgraded to increase train frequency, allowing greater volumes of ore shipment. In 2012 the railway carried an estimated 711,201 tons of merchandise and 255,930 passengers.

At Owendo COMILOG operates a private ore shipment terminal and storage facilities with capacity for three months' production. The ore shipment port at Owendo was inaugurated in 1988, and the cableway was shut down in 1991. The company laid off 955 workers. The workers claimed compensation for unfair dismissal, but the case dragged out until September 2015, when the Court of Appeal of Paris ordered COMILOG to compensate the workers. After ore shipments stopped the Republic of the Congo expropriated the track and equipment in their country, worth about 60 billion CFA francs. The COMILOG railway in the DRC was taken over by the CFCO (Chemin de fer Congo-Océan) and is the main means of transport for people and goods north of Niari. The aerial cableway was sold to South Korea and dismantled in 1993.

== Development at Moanda ==
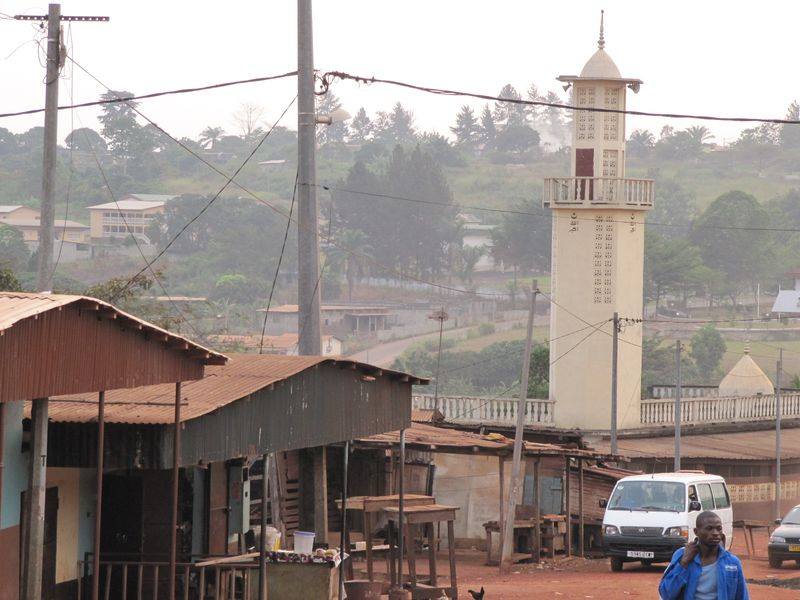
Town of Moanda

As of 2001 the Moanda mine had a capacity of 2.5 million tons of ore per year, with reserves of 100 years. The ore is mined by the open pit technique, using trenches 600 to 900 metres (2,000 to 3,000 ft) long and 20 metres (66 ft) wide. The waste, accounting for 50% of material extracted, is backfilled. Ore beneficiation includes crushing, screening and drum washing. At first COMILOG used blast furnaces in Boulogne and China to produce most of the manganese alloys. This changed in 1999 when Eramet bought the Sauda and Porsgrunn plants in Norway and the Marietta, Ohio plant in the US. The Boulogne plant was later closed.

The Complex Industriel de Moanda (CIM) was inaugurated on 30 December 2000 by Omar Bongo, President of Gabon. In January 2001 COMILOG announced the start of construction of the CIM in partnership with the state of Gabon. The processing unit would let COMILOG export manganese agglomerate for production of ferromanganese, with a capacity of 600,000 tons of agglomerate per year. Until then only crude manganese ore had been exported. The MIC would first enrich and then agglomerate high-grade manganese ore. Until 2007 COMILOG dumped the 0–1 millimetre (0.000–0.039 in) fines, and used only the richer 1–8 millimetres (0.039–0.315 in) fines to produce sinter. In 2007 Eramet began trials of the feasibility of using part of the lower-grade fines in sintering.

In 2009 work began on building the Complexe Métallurgique de Moanda (CMM), which would produce silico-manganese (Note: Silico-manganese is an alloy of 65–68% manganese, 16–21% silicon and 1.5–2% carbon, produced by smelting at high temperatures. It is used as an additive in the steel industry, as a deoxidant or as input to producing other alloys of manganese.) and manganese metal. Construction of the CMM was completed in December 2014. Production of silico-manganese began that year. On 12 June 2015 Ali Bongo Ondimba, President of Gabon, officially inaugurated the CMM, the first manganese processing factory in the country. The 50 hectares (120 acres) facility has two plants, one with an annual capacity of 65,000 tons of silico-manganese, and the other with an annual capacity of 20,000 tons of manganese metal. Construction cost about €228.67, entirely financed by private companies. To support the facility the state of Gabon built the Grand Poubara hydroelectric dam with an existing capacity of 160 MW and planned capacity of 280 MW. In 2016 the School of Mines and Metallurgy was opened in Moanda. The school, in partnership with the Ministry of Education, was to train 150 people per year.

== Volumes ==
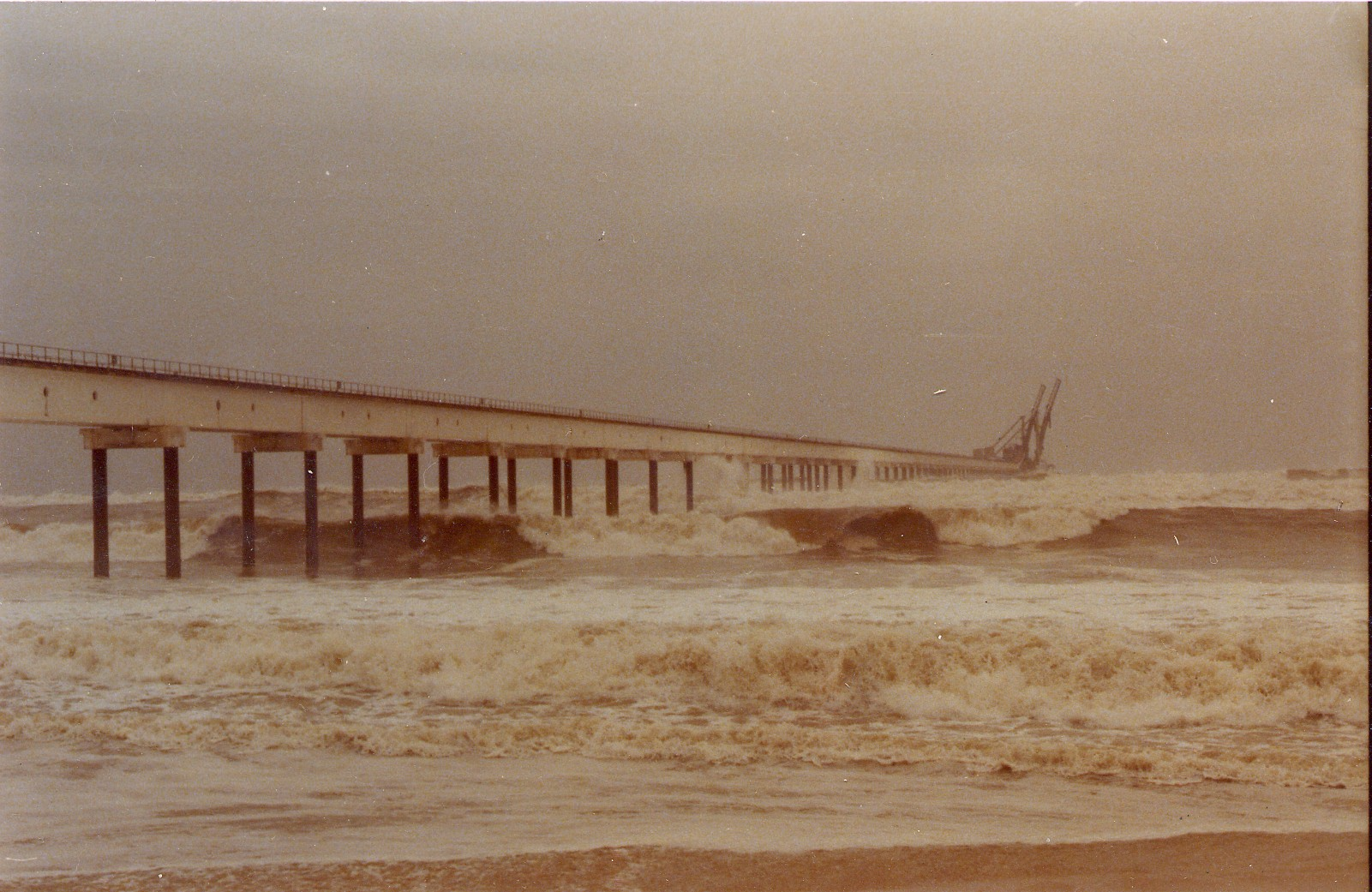
Wharf at Pointe-Noire

In the first year COMILOG exported 500,000 tons of ore via Point Noire, which soon rose to 1 million tons annually. In 1977 COMILOG shipped 1,859,000 tons of ore, and in 1978 shipped 1,694,416 tons. Manganese ore production at Moanda, including sinter, grew from 1.95 million tons in 2003 to 2.46 million tons in 2004. As of 2005 most of the sinter produced by COMILOG was shipped to a smelter in France operated by the Eramet subsidiary, SFPO (Société du Ferromanganèse de Paris-Outreau).

In 2011 the company produced 3.43 million tons of ore and exported 3,383,000 tons of ore and 64,000 tons of manganese alloys. Although output had risen by 5.8% over 2010, revenue dropped by 17% due to an 18% drop in prices. Production fell to 3 million tonnes in 2012 due to weak demand in China and Europe, the main markets. As of 2013 about 90% of the ore was used for steel production, and half the exports were to China. 2014 operating income was 90 billion CFA francs, compared to 143 billion CFA francs in 2013. The decline was due to a major railway accident in 2014 and a decline in manganese prices. In 2014 Gabon was the third largest producer of manganese ore in the world, after South Africa and Australia.

== Ownership and management ==
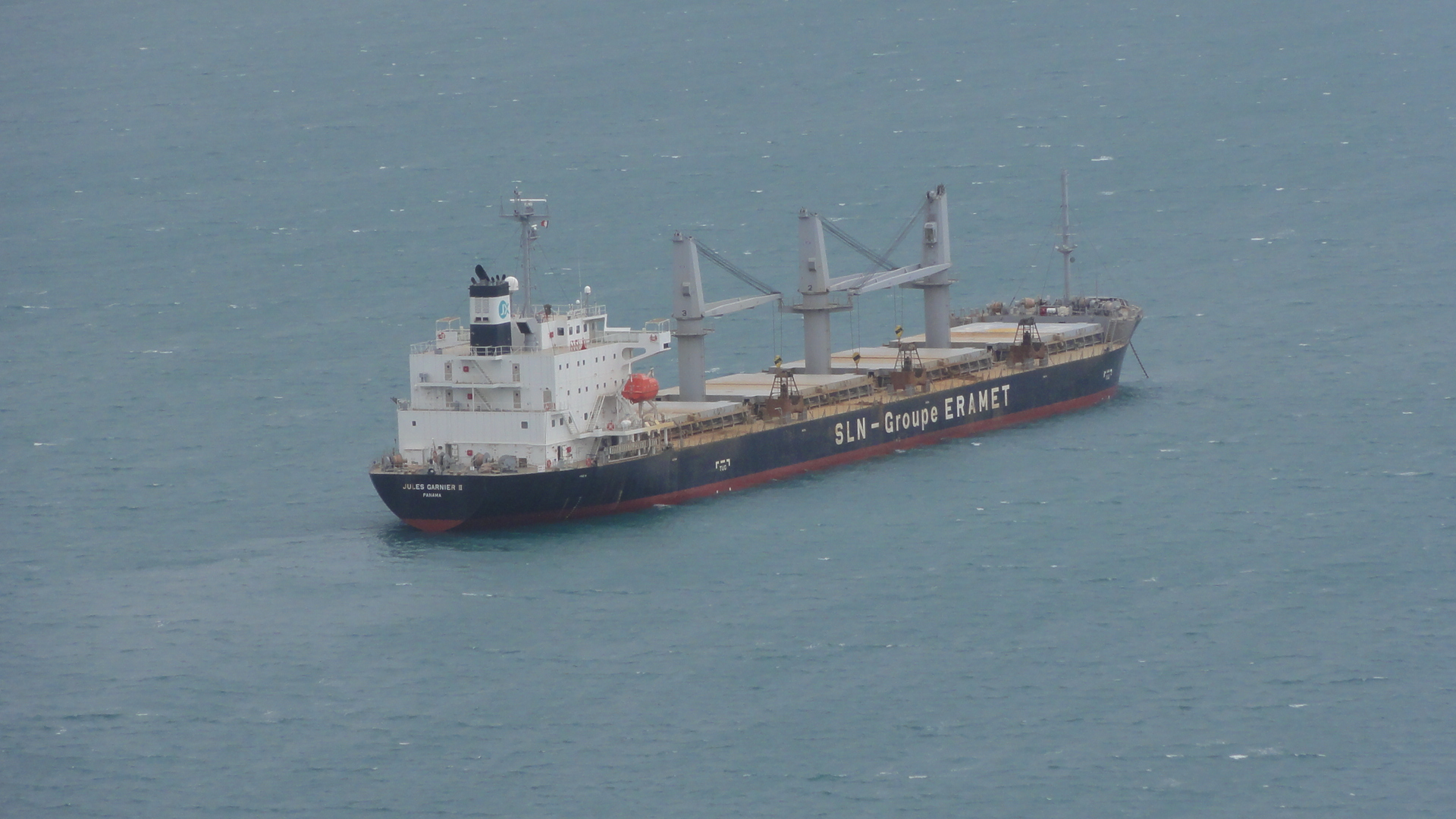
SLN (Eramet) Jules Garnier II bulk carrier

The Compagnie minière de l'Ogooué (COMILOG) was established in 1953 as a joint corporation owned by the Bureau of Mines of Overseas France (21%), Eastern Tjbangi Mining Company (15%), Mokta el Hadid group (15%) and U.S. Steel (49%). COMILOG had initial capital of CFA 150 million. The NickelSLN Metallurgical Company was formed in 1974, with equal shares held by Elf Aquitaine and Imétal (formerly Société Le Nickel). There were various changes in ownership over the following years, and the name was changed to Eramet. In 1995–96 Eramet acquired a 46% stake in COMILOG. COMILOG acquired a facility at Guangxi, China, in 1995 and at Guilin, China, in 2002. Both were silicomanganese producers.

As of 2001 the company was the second largest producer of manganese ore in the world and had about 4,450 employees. COMILOG was owned 57% by Eramet, 27% by the state of Gabon and 8% by COGEMA. In 2010 the state of Gabon increased its holdings in COMILOG, which was now owned 63.7% by Eramet, 28.9% by Gabon, 7% by Formang Holding and 0.4% by others. In 2011 Marcel Abéké was succeeded by Jean Fabre as general manager. In 2013 COMILOG was providing 70% of the funding for the Maboumine rare-earth mineral exploration project. In October 2014 the state holdings were transferred to the Société équatoriale des mines, a private company 100% owned by the state.

The state's rail company OCTRA (Office du chemin de fer transgabonais) was privatized late in 2004 by a group consisting of Transgabonais, some timber companies, the Belgian rail company Transurb and others. COMILOG led a competing group, but decided not to submit a final bid. As of 2012 COMILOG employed 3,200 people in Gabon, including 1,700 at the Société d’exploitation du Transgabonais (SETRAG), the subsidiary that operates the railway. In 2015 SETRAG took responsibility for maintenance of the railway. That year Jean Fabre was replaced by Hervé Montégu.

== Sources ==
- Bhardwaj, B.P (2014-01-01), The Complete Book on Ferroalloys, Niir Project Consultancy Services, ISBN 978-93-81039-29-8
- Clark, John F.; Decalo, Samuel (2012-08-09), Historical Dictionary of Republic of the Congo, Scarecrow Press, ISBN 978-0-8108-7989-8
- "COMILOG", Congopage (in French), 27 March 2006
- Démarrage du Complexe Industriel de Moanda au Gabon (in French), Eramet, 21 January 2001
- Elischer, Sebastian; Hofmeier, Rolf; Mehler, Andreas; Melber, Henning (2015-10-08), Africa Yearbook, vol. 11: Politics, Economy and Society South of the Sahara in 2014, BRILL, ISBN 978-90-04-30505-2
- Gabon 2012, Oxford Business Group, 2012, ISBN 978-1-907065-69-9
- Gabon Mining Laws and Regulations Handbook, International Business Publications, USA, 2008-03-03, ISBN 978-1-4330-7742-5
- "Georges Charles PERRINEAU (1912–1994)", Annales des Mines (in French)
- Gros, Philippe (August 2008), "La COMILOG, une "success story"" (PDF), Réalités Industrielles (in French)
- Hickendorff, Annelies (2014-09-19), Gabon, Bradt Travel Guides, ISBN 978-1-84162-554-6
- Historique (in French), COMILOG
- Le Gabon se lance dans la transformation du manganèse (in French), dakar direct tv, 16 June 2015, archived from the original on 2016-04-04
- Les grandes dates de l’histoire d’ERAMET (PDF) (in French), Eramet, archived from the original (PDF) on 2017-03-29
- "MaK - G 1203 BB", loks-aus-kiel.de (in German)
- "MANGANESE : Bilan 2013 prometteur et optimisme affiché pour 2014 par la COMILOG". 1ere-edition-bulletin-complet (Report) (in French). SEM: Societe Equatoriale des Mines. 2014. Archived from the original on 2016-04-26.
- Messer, Mary; Houck, Gerald; Engler, Jonathon (August 2006), Silicomanganese from Brazil, China, and Ukraine, Invs. 731-TA-671-673 (Second Review), U.S. International Trade Commission, ISBN 978-1-4578-1881-3
- Manganese Reserves and Resources of the World and Their Industrial Implications: Report, National Materials Advisory Board of the National Academies, 1981, NAP:11507
- Pons, R. (1954), "The French Union in 1953", Civilisations, 4 (2), Institut de Sociologie de l'Université de Bruxelles, JSTOR 41377627
- The Report: Gabon 2013, Oxford Business Group, 2013-10-07, ISBN 978-1-907065-90-3
- Rubio, Juan José Álvarez; Yiannibas, Katerina (2017-01-20), Human Rights in Business: Removal of Barriers to Access to Justice in the European Union, Taylor & Francis, ISBN 978-1-351-97915-3
- "SETRAG poursuit son succès en 2011", Gabonlibre (in French), 21 March 2012, archived from the original on 9 May 2016
- Shillington, Kevin (2013-07-04), Encyclopedia of African History 3-Volume Set, Routledge, ISBN 978-1-135-45670-2
- Silico Manganese, Westbrook Resources
- "Smelting Process", Britannica.com
