= Bilinga =

Bilinga may refer to:

- Bilinga, Queensland, a suburb of the Gold Coast, Queensland
- Bilinga, Republic of the Congo, a village
- Bilinga (wood), a tropical hardwood
