= Jean Malonga =

Jean Malonga (February 25, 1907 in Kibouende, French Congo – 1985) is credited as one of the earliest of the modern Republic of Congo writers. Prior to Malonga, Congolese literature in Brazzaville consisted of scattered pre-World War II French language works. He began his career as a writer in the Kongo language magazine Liaison. He was also a Congolese politician who served in the French Senate from 1948 to 1955.

== Works ==
- Coeur d'Aryenne (Heart of Aryenne) (1954)
