= Cominco Resources =

Cominco Resources Limited
- Company type: BVI
- Traded as: Cominco
- Industry: Metals and Mining
- Headquarters: London
- Key people: Roderick Smith
- Products: Phosphate
- Revenue: NA
- Number of employees: 100
- Website: comincoresources.com

Cominco Resources is a private company which is developing the US$2billion Hinda phosphate project located in The Republic of the Congo. Through its subsidiary, it owns 100% of the Hinda Phosphate Project, which comprises the Hinda Permit (granted in December 2009), and the Kolatchikanou Permit (granted in June 2011). The Hinda project is the world's largest undeveloped phosphate deposit, with a JORC Mineral Resource of 678 million tonnes (Mt) and a Minable Ore Reserve of 405 Mt, sufficient for over 24 years of production. Cominco Resources was merged with Kropz in December 2018 and listed on the AIM market.

Cominco owns 100% of the Hinda and Kolatchikanou phosphate exploration licences, covering 1,663 km^{2} of ROC's coastal basin, upon which Cominco discovered and delineated a large graben hosted, marine sedimentary phosphate deposit between 300 m and 800 m wide, running roughly parallel to the Atlantic coast. The deposit is relatively homogeneous and thick and has a very low overburden to ore ratio (1.5 m^{3}:t). The orebody is one of few that can be open pit mined, by free digging with no need for ripping or blasting.

On 7 December 2015, the Ministry of Mines and Geology granted Cominco an Exploitation (Mining) Licence for phosphate covering an area of 263 km^{2}.

The company's African operations are located at Rond-Point d'Avoum, Centre-Ville in Pointe Noire.

== Resources and Geology ==
The Republic of Congo has considerable resources of sedimentary phosphates (Apatite), dating from the Upper Cretaceous to Lower Eocene periods. The deposits form a string of outcrops that extend over 50 km along the coast inland from Pointe-Noire, and are exposed within a 750 m-wide belt, most of which falls within Cominco's licence areas.

The Hinda phosphate orebody is housed within the Upper Cretaceous (Maastrichtian) Holle region and younger sediments are situated within the Cretaceous to Quaternary, terrestrial to marine, succession of an intra-continental rift within the Congolese Coastal Basin. Sedimentary phosphates are exposed east and north of Pointe Noire, within an approximately 750m wide fault bounded belt which trends north-west and extends into Angola to the south and Gabon to the north. The belt is considered to have been preserved within a post-Palaeogene, pre-Pliocene (potentially Miocene) graben.

On 4 December the company announced a JORC Compliant 531 Mt at 11.1% P_{2}0_{5} at a 7% P_{2}0_{5} cut-off, of which 89% is in the Measured and Indicated category. The MRE was provided by CSA Global (UK) Ltd. The latest MRE is based on a 5% P_{2}0_{5} Cut-off grade.

17 November 2015 Hinda Mineral Resource Estimate
Category	Tonnes	P_{2}0_{5} (%)	U308 (ppm)	MgO (%)
Measured	194.1	12.0	76	3.8
Indicated	365.4	10.3	74	3.2
Inferred	89.0	7.6	65	3.3
Total	648.4	10.4	74	3.4

In April 2015, SRK Consulting released a 2014 JORC Compliant Minable Reserve Statement.

April 2015 Hinda Ore Reserve Statement
Category	Tonnes	P_{2}0_{5} (%)	MgO (%)	U3O8 (ppm)
Proved	158.7	12.1	4.2	66.9
Probable	246.3	10.4	4.2	71.3
Total	404.9	11.0	4.2	68.6

A total of 929 diamond and reverse-circulation holes have been drilled by Cominco in the Hinda deposit, over 66,231 m. Phosphate mineralisation is hosted by Upper Cretaceous to Quaternary sediments up to 65 m thick and from surface at the mine start location.

== Hinda Project ==
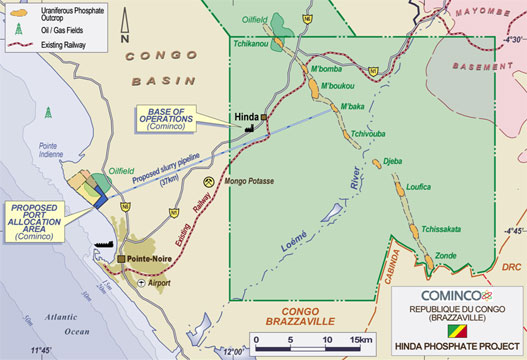
Location of Cominco's Hinda Project in the Republic of Congo

Cominco's Hinda Project lies 37 km northeast of Pointe-Noire in the Kouilou Department. Existing road and rail infrastructure connect the project to the major seaport at Point Noire.

The project involves the development of an open cut mine and in-pit crushing of an average 18 Mt/y of ore, a beneficiation plant approximately 12 km from the Hinda village, 37 km northeast of Pointe-Noire, a major deep-sea container port and the industrial capital of ROC. The beneficiation plant will treat an average of 7.2 Mt/y of screened ore grading 21.7% P_{2}0_{5} to produce 4.1 Mt/y of phosphate rock grading 32% P_{2}0_{5}. A slurry pipeline will transport the product 42.1 km to the port site (Pointe Indienne) slightly north of Pointe-Noire. Product dewatering, drying, storage and shiploading facilities will be built at the port site.

Electrical power for the project is supplied by interconnection to the ROC national grid, with a 16 km long 220kV overhead transmission line linking the existing M’Boundi substation with the Hinda beneficiation plant, and a 16 km long 30 kV overhead transmission line linking the Mongo Kamba substation to the Pointe Indienne port site.

Natural gas is used in the flash dryer to dry the phosphate rock concentrate at Pointe Indienne. A new 150 mm diameter, 17 km long buried off-take pipeline delivers natural gas from Mengo to the Pointe Indienne port facilities. Prior to being dried in the flash dryer, the phosphate slurry is first dried using a filter press.

The dried phosphate rock concentrate is reclaimed from the covered stockpile by a portal scraper that travels the length of the covered stockpile, onto a reclaim transfer pad fitted with two weightometers, a cross belt sampler and moisture analyser. An enclosed product conveyor runs to the vessel loading platform via a causeway and jetty for export in ocean going vessels, ranging from 35,000 dwt Handymax bulk carriers up to 65,000 dwt Ultramax sized vessels, at 4,000 t/h.

=== Historical Studies ===
==== Scoping Study ====
The company, in conjunction with Jacobs Engineering, completed a scoping study which demonstrated a mine life of over 20 years and operating cost of around $35/tonne of product sold. The company is also looking at the possibility of an 8 million tonne/year operation. The scoping study indicates capital costs of US$616 million for the first stage.

== Definitive Feasibility Study ==
In May 2015, Cominco Resources, in conjunction with their lead engineer Ausenco, completed the Definitive Feasibility Study for the Hinda phosphate mine site, beneficiation plant and port.

In 2014, Cominco awarded a contract to Ausenco Engineering Canada Inc. for the provision of services relating to specification and supervision of metallurgical testing, and the preparation of a DFS for the project. SRK Consulting (UK) Ltd was engaged by Cominco to complete the mining components of the DFS. The DFS was managed by Ausenco, including liaison with and compilation of work completed by SRK, other consultants and Cominco's technical team. Extensive geotechnical campaigns were conducted across the orebody, beneficiation plant site, slurry pipeline and the port site at Pointe Indienne.

WSP managed the environmental baseline studies and the development of an independent ESIA for the exploitation phase of the project.

The DFS, completed in May 2015, estimated the Net Present Value of the project at $1.87Billion, with a IRR of 38% based on a mine schedule delivering 4.1 mt/pa of phosphate rock concentrate.

=== Pilot Program ===
Extensive metallurgical testing and piloting was performed as part of the DFS. The majority of the DFS test program was undertaken by Mintek at their facilities in Johannesburg, South Africa. Additional tests were conducted by vendors and subcontractors.

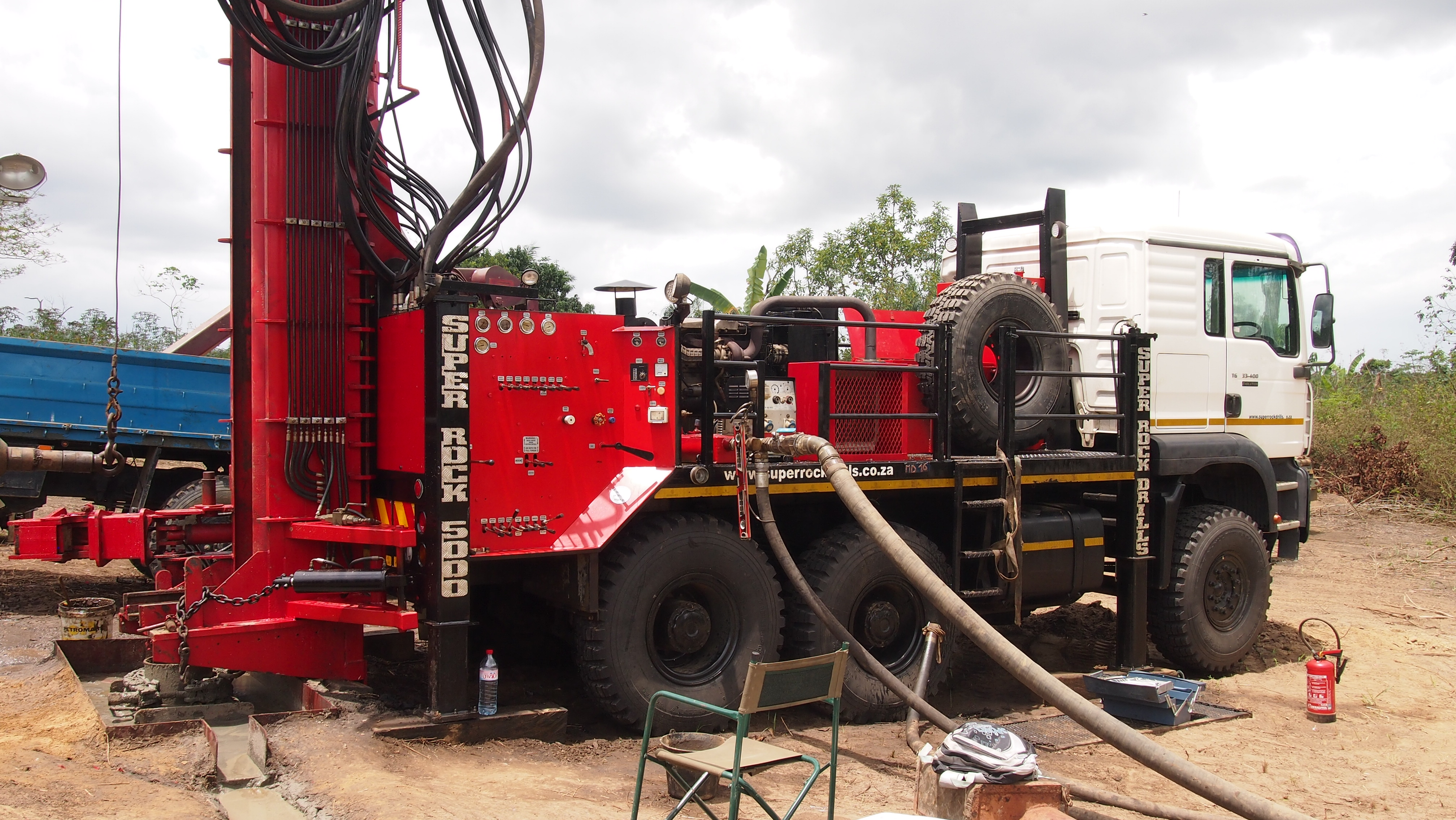
An 8" coring tool fitted to a drilling rig at the Hinda Mine Site

A representative ore bulk sample of approximately 65 t was recovered by large diameter (200 mm) diamond core drilling and shipped to Mintek in Johannesburg for metallurgical testing. The large diameter core was used to ensure that large unbroken pieces were available for crushing tests. The core was taken from the full thickness of the ore zone at seven locations, to ensure full representation.

Over 300 bench-scale flotation tests were undertaken at Mintek. Bench tests were also performed by China Bluestar Lehigh Engineering (Chinaant Custom Chemicals (Germany), and ArrMaz (USA).

=== Acidulation Work ===
Acidulation pilot work at Prayon Technologies SA Belgium, as part of the DFS, demonstrated the ability to make good quality acid with 97% P_{2}O_{5} recovery from Hinda phosphate rock, with average filtration rates. Commercial grade DAP and MAP fertiliser was also produced.

The concentrate produced from Hinda Ore during testing at Mintek in South Africa and Bluestar in China proved that high quality phosphate rock of 32% P_{2}0_{5} could be produced by the project. The grade achieved for Hinda phosphate rock is saleable to fertiliser producers. The Minor Element Ratio (MER = %Fe_{2}O_{3} + %Al_{2}O_{3} + %MgO) / %P_{2}0_{5}) is within the limits that make Hinda phosphate rock ideally suited to acid production and the CaO / P_{2}0_{5} ratio is well within industry limits. All other potentially deleterious elements, such as Hg, Cd, Cl and Pb, are very low. In addition, acidulation testing undertaken by Prayon in Belgium confirm the suitability of Hinda concentrate for phosphoric acid production.

=== Mine Design ===
The mining operation is a conventional open-pit truck and shovel, with in-pit crushing and conveying (IPCC) for both free dig ore and, after 5 years, overburden. The pit will be mined to full depth of economic mineralisation and then advanced northwest along strike, allowing for continual backfill. The truck and shovel operation will consist of:

- Initially two 550 t CAT6050BH backhoes operating in ore and overburden with custom buckets, followed by the addition of two CAT6060FS AC electric face shovels operating in overburden, commencing in Year 5 and 7, when the third and fourth shovels are required to meet production.
- CAT789D 193 t payload haul trucks, with a peak of 32 haul trucks over the life of the mine (LOM).
- Customised 31 m3 shovel buckets and light weight truck trays specific to the site material characteristics, principally low abrasivity.
- A development fleet (of up to ten 40 t articulated trucks) will be used for construction work required to support the mine operations. These activities include tailings dam construction, surface water diversion, building of the access corridor, site works to support the IPCC, road construction and maintenance and topsoil stripping and stockpiling and subsequent placement for rehabilitation.

=== Beneficiation Plant ===
The beneficiation plant and mine are accessed by an existing 14.6 km public road between the paved N1 Highway at Hinda and the beneficiation plant. It will be upgraded at the start of construction and will continue to be shared as an unlit public road. Electrical power for the beneficiation is supplied by interconnection to the ROC national grid with a 16 km long 220 kV overhead transmission line linking with the existing M’Boundi substation.

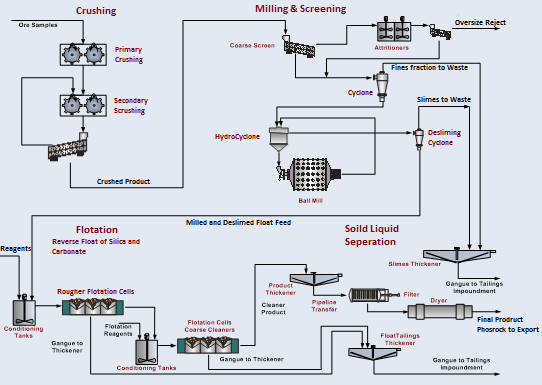
Metallurgical flow sheet of the beneficitation plant for the Hinda Phosphate Project

==== Flow Sheet ====
- Crushing: The incoming ore from the mine site is first secondary crushed using a mineral rolls sizer designed by MMD.
- Pre-Screening: Cosl- remove gangue minseral species, whilst upgrading the phosphate content and evening out mill feed grade. Two double deck screens remove overfirst sized material that is then attrition scrubbed. The attritioned material is screened again to remove the oversizes (coarse rejects), with the undersized material returned to the plant. Hydrocyclones reject the "fines" fraction from the resulting product. A high proportion of magnesia (>70%) reports to these coarse and fines rejects, together with some silica and most of the iron. The phosphate grade of the resulting mid-fraction is upgraded from a LOM average of 11.0% mined to a mill feed averaging 21.7% P_{2}0_{5}. Importantly, this mid fraction is less variable with respect to grade than that of the run-of mine material, which assists control of the downstream flotation process.
- Ball Milling: A single 7.5 MW ball mill grinds the pre-screened )re mid-fraction, liberating the minerals whilst maintaining the particle size required for efficient float concentration.
- Desliming Hydrocyclones: The milled ore is deslimed before the flotation circuit.
- Reverse Rougher Flotation: Three stages of conditioning with a phosphate depressant and carbonate and silica collectors is followed by a Reverse Rougher float to reject the gangue minerals. The roughers produce a sink product of approximately 30% P_{2}0_{5}.
- Reverse Cleaner Flotation: The reverse rougher sink product is processed in to achieve a grade of 32% P_{2}0_{5} and 0.7% MgO.
- Tailings Thickener: Dewaters the tailings, recovering the water for re-use in the process. The underflow is pumped to the tailings storage facility.
- Concentrate Thickener: Densifies the concentrate to 65% w/w solids for storage in the header tanks, prior to pumping the slurry by pipeline 42.1 km to Pointe Indienne.
- Pressure filtration: Dewaters the 60% solids slurry to 10% moisture.
- Concentrate Dryer: A gas-fired flash dryer reduces the moisture to a target level of 3-7% moisture.
- Concentrate Storage: A covered stockpile with stacker and reclaimer provides approximately 200kt storage of dried concentrate prior to ship loading.
- Jetty and Shiploader: A trestle jetty and shiploader is used to load ships up to 65,000 t Ultramax size at a rate of 4,000 t/h.

=== Concentrate Slurry Pipeline ===
Thickened phosphate concentrate slurry is stored in two agitated head tanks, which provide surge capacity of 18 hours at each end of the system. The concentrate thickener provides four hours of additional storage. Slurry is pumped from the head tanks at 60% solids w/w to the mainline slurry pumps, via centrifugal charge pumps.

The 42.1 km long, 300 mm outside diameter carbon steel slurry pipeline is buried to a depth of 1 m for protection, to remove any conflict of land use and so as not to present a barrier to people and fauna en route. The system includes leak detection, pressure monitoring, cathodic corrosion protection, fibre-optic telecommunications linking the mine site to Pointe Indienne, discharge end line choking and mass balance measurement.

A single mainline pump station is located at the beneficiation plant. Two single stage, 1.5 MW positive displacement piston pumps, with variable speed drives, pressure pulsation dampeners, and pressure relief devices, are provided with one pump in operation and one standby. The system is designed to operate continuously for the life of the project, with a maximum operating pressure of 87 bar. The system is well within the envelope of proven technology and is comparable to other phosphate pipelines currently in commercial operation.

Ausenco PSI, based in Concord California, undertook the design and cost estimation of the concentrate slurry pipeline. PSI has a long history in slurry pipeline design that extends over 33 years, and was selected by Groupe Cherifien des Phosphates (OCP) to complete the basic design of the OCP phosphate pipeline project in Morocco.

Exploration
Feasibility
Construction
Survey Exploration
Exploration Drilling
Resource Drilling
Geotechnical Drilling
Early Works
Project Conceptualisation
Scoping Study
Feasibility Study
Definitive Feasibility and Engineering
Front End Engineering
Commissioning
│
2008
│
2010
│
2012
│
2014
│
2016
│
2018

== See also ==
- Republic of Congo
- Mining in the Republic of Congo
