= Economy of the Congo =

Economy of the Congo may refer to:

- Economy of the Democratic Republic of the Congo
- Economy of the Republic of the Congo
