= Bangombe Plateau =

Geographical feature in Gabon

Coordinates: 1°34′11″S 13°17′39″E

The Bangombe Plateau (sometimes written as Bongombé) is a plateau covering 42 square kilometres (16 sq mi) east of Moanda, in the Haut-Ogooué Region of Gabon. Exploitation of manganese deposits started on the plateau in 1953 by the Compagnie Minière de l'Ogooué (COMILOG).

It also contains Oklo, one of the naturally occurring fission reactors.

== Features ==
- The town of Moanda is built on the edge of the slopes of the plateau.
- The plateau is also home to an airfield and a golf course.
- Moanda Railway Station lies in the north of the plateau.

== See also ==
- Oklo
