= List of tunnels in Africa =

This is a list of railway tunnels in Africa.

== Existing ==
=== Algeria ===
- Has about 46 tunnels

=== Congo ===
- The Congo–Ocean Railway contains the notorious Bamba tunnel.

=== Ghana ===
- Ghana Railway Corporation Decree of 1977 presupposes tunnels

=== Mauritania ===
- Choum Tunnel - replaced by open air deviation

=== Morocco ===
- Only one existing tunnel.
- Bouskoura Tunnel Casablanca

=== South Africa ===
- Cedara Twin Tunnels - Longest railway tunnel in South Africa for 29 years
- Chapman's Peak Drive - Half Tunnel, Cape Town - M6.
- Cogmanskloof Tunnel, Western Cape - R62.
- Hartbeespoort Tunnel, North West - R104.
- Hendrik Verwoerd Tunnels, Limpopo on the N1.
- Hex River Tunnels - Railway tunnels through the Hex River Mountains of the Western Cape Province.
- Huguenot Tunnel - a toll road tunnel near Paarl, also on the N1.
- J.G. Strijdom Tunnel, Limpopo - R36.
- Kouga dam wall tunnel, Eastern Cape - just off the R332.
- Kowyns Pass - Half Tunnel, Mpumalanga - R533.
- Lang's nek Tunnel, KwaZulu Natal - a disused railway tunnel between Newcastle and Charlstown.
- Old Van Reenen Tunnel, KwaZulu Natal - just off the N3 - S 28° 22.272 E 029° 25.782.
- Daspoort Tunnel - Daspoort Tunnel is a road tunnel on the R55 in Pretoria.
- Overvaal Tunnel (Oogies)
- Watervalboven Tunnel, Mpumalanga - on the N4.
- Van Reenen Spiral Railway Tunnel, Van Reenen

=== Eritrea ===
outside Keren. But it appears that for some reason they didn't think of blowing up the rail tunnels on the Agordat-Keren line

=== Tanzania ===
- TAZARA - 23 tunnels

=== Zambia ===
- TAZARA - 23 tunnels

== Finance ==
- Tunnels are expensive to build compared to surface tracks, especially for long tunnels due to limited access to the work site. The London cross city tunnel is reckoned at UKP 68m per km.

== Expedience ==
- Freeman Gordor

== See also ==
- List of tunnels
