= Indienne, Congo =

Place in the Republic of the Congo

Coordinates: 4°39′41″S 11°47′0″E

Pointe Indienne is a cape north of Pointe Noire in the Republic of the Congo. It is also the name of the beach close to it.

== Transport ==
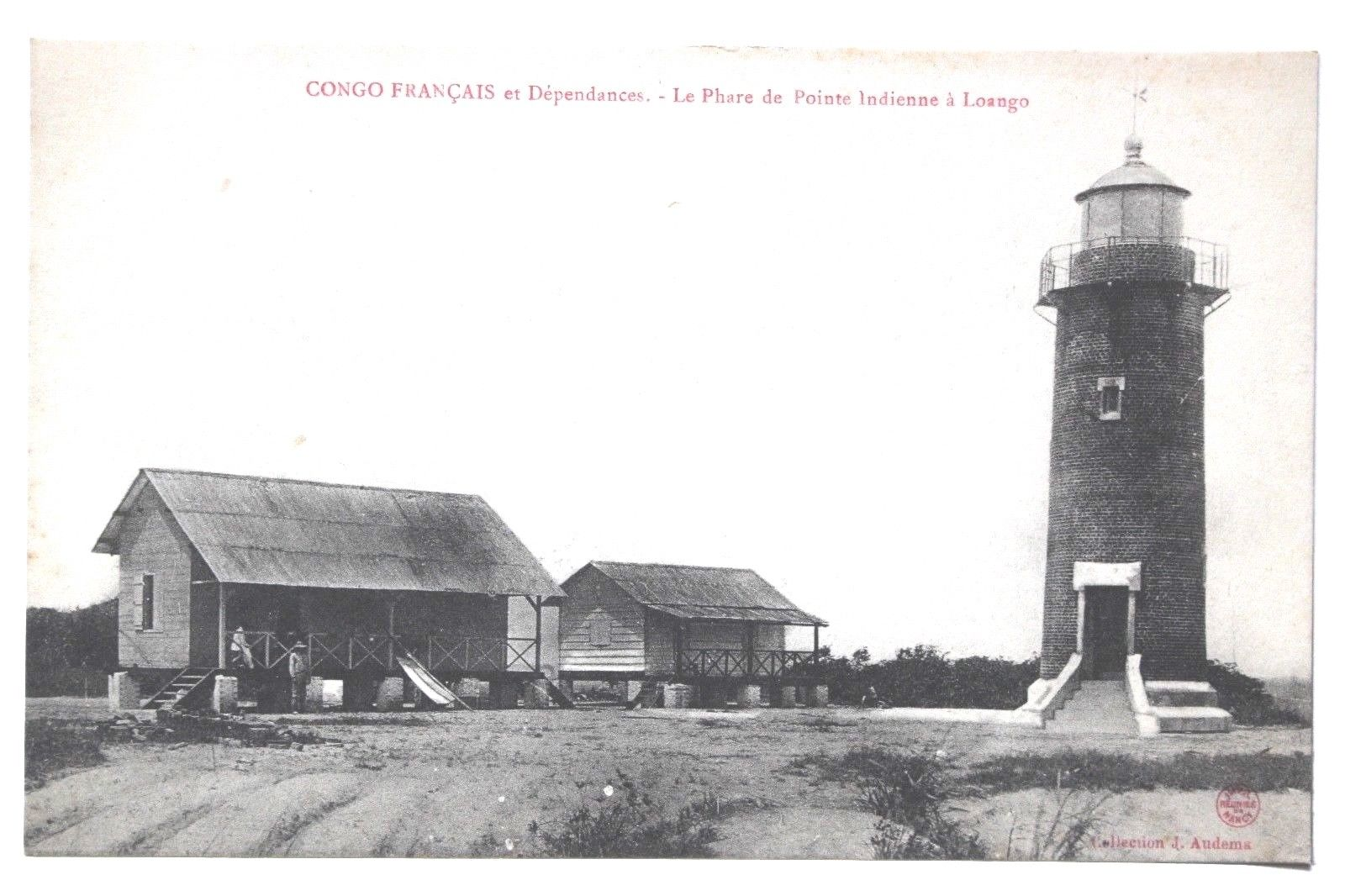
Pointe Indienne lighthouse circa 1900

The place is the proposed site of a new deep water port for the export of iron ore.

South African miner Exxaro is looking at exporting up to 10mtpa of iron ore from the Port Indienne, including the construction of a 35 km rail spur to the existing Congo–Ocean Railway.

== See also ==
- Railway stations in Congo
- List of Panamax ports
