= Monto Bello =

- Location in the Republic of the Congo
- Coordinates: 04°08′34″S 12°54′49″E
- Country: Republic of the Congo
- Region: Bouenza Region
- District: Mfouati District

Monto Bello is a small town in the south of the Republic of Congo.

== Railways ==
Mont Belo is also the railway junction for the branchline to Mbinda.

== See also ==
- Railway stations in Congo
