= Miosso River =

River in Gabon

The Miosso River is a river flowing south of the town of Moanda in Gabon. It enters the Mberece River. The Miosso River banks are swampy and admit a significant fish population. The resulting Miosso Swamp isolates the Third Zone District and Rigobert Landji Public High School from the city.
