= Kibouende =

- Location in the Republic of the Congo
- Coordinates: 4°9′28″S 14°53′55″E
- Country: Republic of the Congo
- Department: Pool
- District: Kinkala

Kibouende (Kongo: Kibuende, Kibwende) is one of a number of places in the Republic of Congo with this name. This one is in the Pool Department and has a population of 1,342 inhabitants (census 2007).

== Transport ==
Kibouende is served by a narrow gauge railway station on the main Congo-Ocean Railway.

== See also ==
- Railway stations in Congo
