= COMILOG Cableway =

Cableway in Gabon and the Republic of Congo

The COMILOG Cableway was one of the longest cableways in the world, until its closure in 1986. The ropeway conveyor ran for 76 km from Moanda in the Haut-Ogooué Province of south eastern Gabon to Mbinda in the Republic of Congo.

In 1954, the Compagnie Minière de l'Ogooué (COMILOG), a French-American company formed the previous year, decided to begin mining manganese in the Gabonese town of Moanda. The town lay deep in the rainforest, and export of the metal was a problem. The nearest reliable transport route was the Congo-Ocean Railway, but this lay more than 250km away, across difficult terrain. George Perrineau was charged with constructing a transport link between the two.

It was decided to construct a cableway from Moanda to Mbinda, and then branch of the Congo-Ocean Railway to Mont Bello, from which the existing railway would link to the port of Pointe-Noire. The conveyor was routed via the small town of Bakoumba, which became the centre for the maintenance of the structure. The mine opened in 1957, and the Cableway was opened in 1959, the link finally being completed when the Congo-Ocean Railway branch opened in 1962.

The Cableway consisted of ten sections, and had 858 supports of between 5 and 74m in height. One tonne cars carried the manganese twenty-four hours a day.

The government of Gabon was keen to ship the valuable manganese ore through its own ports, and routed a new railway, the Transgabonais, from the national capital Libreville to Moanda, and on to Franceville. When this opened, in 1986, the cableway was closed. While Moanda continued to prosper, Bakoumba and Mbinda suffered from the withdrawal of their main industry. COMILOG funded the creation of the Lékédi Park at Bakoumba to encourage the development of a tourist industry, but some groups in Congo felt that unemployment there was not addressed.

== See also ==
- Ropeway conveyor
- Aerial lift
- Norsjö aerial tramway
