= Third Zone =

The Third Zone District of Moanda lies south of the city of Moanda, Gabon. It is isolated from the city by the Miosso Swamp and its only connection remains the Moanda-Bakoumba road, which passes between Mounts Moanda and Boundinga and continues to the border with Congo-Brazzaville.

== Geography ==
The Third Zone District is home to Rigobert Landji Public High School, the largest high school in Moanda. The high school is built on a previously unoccupied plateau, making Moanda a town built on four plateaus.
