= Tchitondi =

Village in Republic of the Congo

Coordinates: 04°32′22″S 12°08′50″E

Tchitondi is a small village in the Republic of the Congo.

== Transport ==
It is served by a station on the Congo-Ocean Railway.

== Accidents ==
On 22 June 2010, a serious train derailment down a nearby ravine saw 72 or more casualties.

== See also ==
- Railway stations in Republic of the Congo
