= Grand Poubara Dam =

Dam in Haut-Ogooué, Gabon

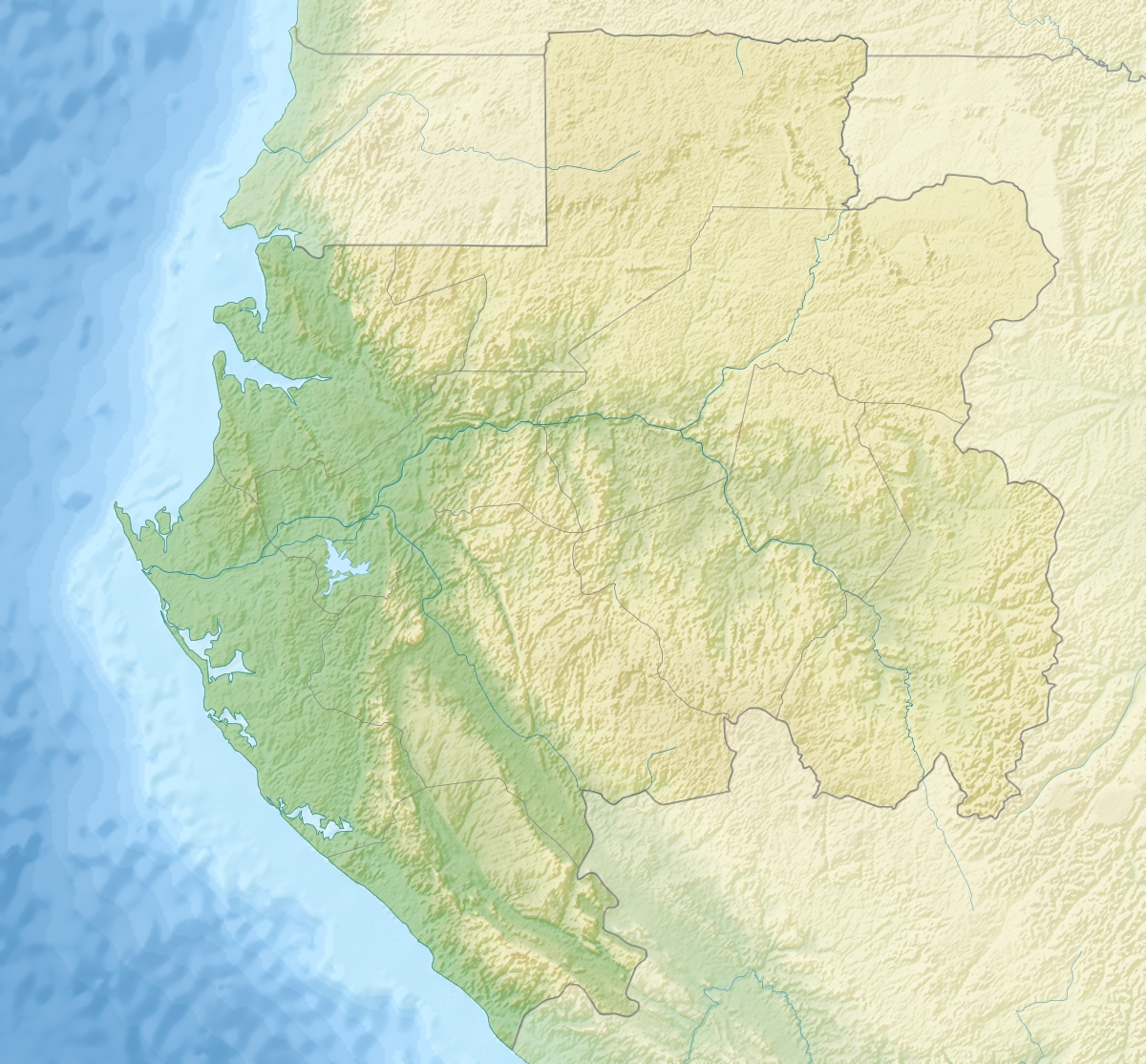
- Location within Gabon
- Country: Gabon
- Location: Franceville, Haut-Ogooué Province
- Coordinates: 1°46′22.67″S 13°33′4.18″E
- Purpose: Power
- Status: Operational
- Construction began: 2008
- Opening date: 2013; 13 years ago
- Owners: Ministry of Mining, Energy, Oil and Water Resources

Dam and spillways
- Type of dam: Gravity, roller-compacted concrete
- Impounds: Ogooué River
- Height: 37 m (121 ft)

Grand Poubara Power Station
- Coordinates: 1°45′47.20″S 13°32′40.05″E
- Commission date: 2013
- Turbines: 4 x 40 MW (54,000 hp) Francis-type
- Installed capacity: 160 MW (210,000 hp)

The Grand Poubara Dam is a gravity dam on the Ogooué River, about 15 kilometres (9.3 mi) south of Franceville in Gabon. The primary purpose of the dam is hydroelectric power generation, and it supports a 160 megawatts (210,000 hp) power station.

== History ==
The government of Gabon signed a $84 million loan with China in 2008 to finance the construction of the dam. The goal was to develop an alternative power source to the Kongou Falls Dam for the iron ore extraction sites also operated by the Chinese in Belinga.

Construction on the project began in November 2008, the river was diverted in November 2010, and the power station was commissioned on 5 August 2013. The dam diverts the river around the Poubara Falls where four 40-megawatt (54,000 hp) Francis turbine-generators are powered. The majority of the dam and power station was funded by the Chinese government and the project was constructed by Sinohydro.

Starting in 2015, the Grand Poubara Dam powers Moanda's Metallurgical Complex, the country's first manganese-processing plant.
