= Mayoko District =

Coordinates: 02°19′30″S 12°47′51″E

Mayoko
- District
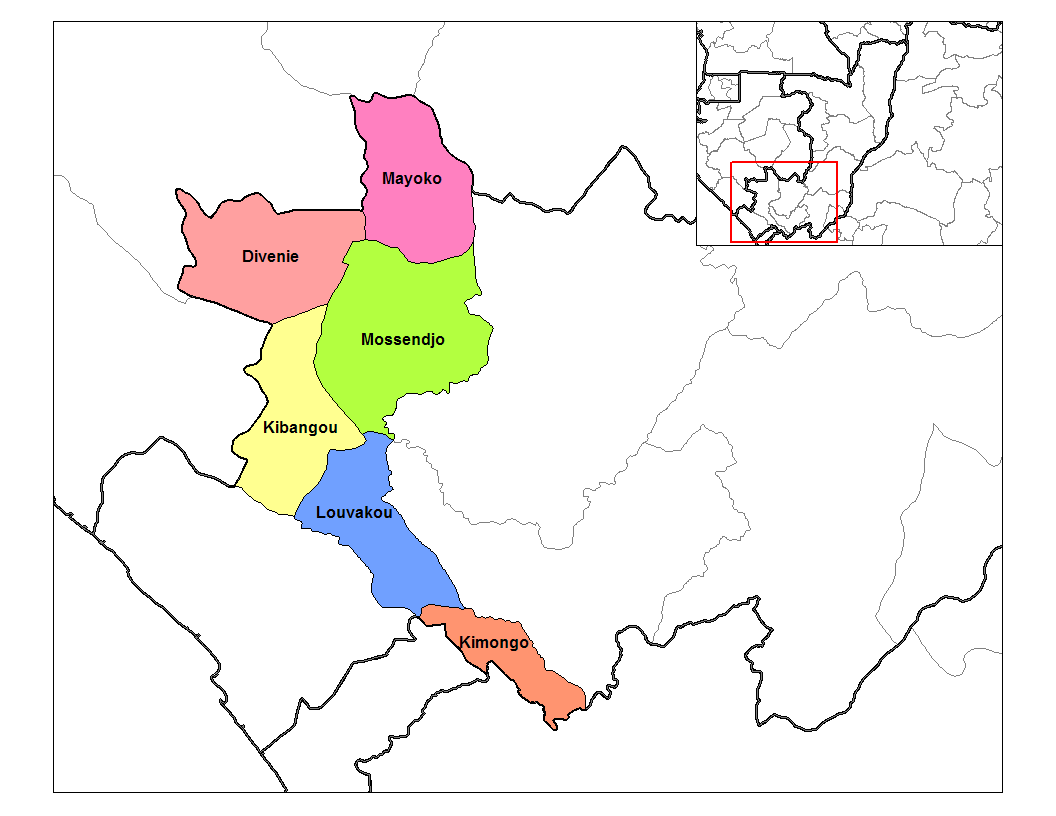
- Mayoko District in the region
- Country: Republic of the Congo
- Department: Niari Department

Area
  - Total: 1,300 sq mi (3,368 km^{2})

Population (2023 census)
  - Total: 8,098
  - Density: 6.227/sq mi (2.404/km^{2})
- Time zone: UTC+1 (GMT +1)

Mayoko District is a district in the Niari Department of south-western Republic of the Congo. The capital lies at Mayoko. It has a northern border with Gabon. As of 2007, the population is 5,147.

== Transport ==
Mayoko is served by a branch railway of the Congo–Ocean Railway that terminates in Mbinda. It lies near the border with Gabon.

== Mining ==
Mayoko is near deposits of iron ore, which are very close to an existing railway line leading to a port. It is location of the Mayoko Iron Ore project.

== See also ==
- Railway stations in the Republic of the Congo
- Iron ore in Africa
