= Moanda Airport =

Moanda Airport Aéroport de Moanda Bangombé
- IATA: MFF; ICAO: FOOD

Summary
- Airport type: Public
- Location: Moanda, Gabon
- Elevation AMSL: 1,893 ft / 577 m
- Coordinates: 1°31′37.2″S 13°15′3.6″E

Map
- Location within Gabon

Runways
Direction	Length		Surface
Direction	m	ft	Surface
12/30	1,900	6,234	Asphalt concrete
- Source: GCM Google Maps SkyVector

Moanda Airport (or Moanda-Bangombé Airport French: Aéroport Moanda) (IATA: MFF, ICAO: FOOD) is an airport serving Moanda, a town in the Haut-Ogooué Province in Gabon. The runway lies to the northeast of the town.

The airport was relocated in December 2010, after two and a half years of construction work, due to the discovery of manganese deposits underneath the old runway. The new runway is 100 metres (330 ft) longer (from 1,800 metres (5,900 ft) to 1,900 metres (6,200 ft)) and 30 metres (98 ft) wide. The construction cost of 6 billion CFA francs was entirely financed by the Compagnie minière de l'Ogooué (a local mining company).

== See also ==
- List of airports in Gabon
- Transport in Gabon
