= Bilinga, Republic of the Congo =

Coordinates: 04°28′55″S 12°14′53″E

Bilinga is a small village in the Republic of the Congo.

== Transport ==
It is served by a station on the Congo-Ocean Railway near the place where a new railway route deviated from the original route.

== Accidents ==
On 22 June 2010, a serious train derailment down a ravine saw 72 or more casualties.

== See also ==
- Railway stations in Republic of the Congo
