= Moanda railway station =

Train station in Gabon

General information
- Location: Gabon
- Coordinates: 1.50302°S 13.28784°E
- System: Railway station
- Line: Trans-Gabon Railway

Services
Preceding station	Trans-Gabon Railway	Following station
Mboungou-Mbadouma towards Owendo	Trans-Gabon Railway	Franceville terminus
Location

Moanda railway station is a station on the Trans-Gabon Railway and the penultimate stop before Franceville railway station, the southern terminus of the railway. Like many stations of the Trans-Gabon, it lies outside the limits of Moanda itself, in an isolated plain. Moanda railway station lies 50 km to Franceville Railway Station and 661 km to Owendo (PK 0), near Libreville. The Bangombe Plateau lies southwest to the station.

== See also ==
- Railway stations in Gabon
