= Avima =

Mont Avima
- Location within Republic of the Congo

Highest point
- Peak: Mount Avima
- Elevation: 949 m (3,114 ft)
- Coordinates: 1°54′43″N 13°12′43″E

Geography
- Location: Republic of the Congo

The Monts Avima are a mountain range in the Republic of the Congo near Gabon border to the west, and the Cameroon border to the north. The highest peak is the Mt. Avima (949 m above sea level) in a 40 km west to east oriented ridge with several other top points which exceed 900 m above sea level (the plain all around is around 540 m asl). These mounts have a significant deposit of iron ore and few small gold placer deposits. The mountain is covered by rain-forest. The forest is inhabited by a small local tribe of native people who live on from hunting and from alluvial gold mining. Between March and September 2009 it was an access road built from Cameroon border to Mt. Avima for a mining exploration program arriving to the top of the mountain. After the exploration program, the road was covered by the rain forest blocking the access by vehicles to the mountain. Due to the significant quantities and qualities of iron ore discovered, it is expected that mining activities will start in the future.

== Mining ==
The first exploration program on Mt. Avima was carried out from 1964 to 1966 and followed up in 1980 by the French company BRGM and included an airborne magnetic survey followed by 29 diamond drill holes located mainly in the central part of the ridge on the total length of about 2000 m extracting several drilling cores. The access of staff with the drilling equipment to Mt. Avima was done by helicopters. In the years 2009 and 2010, the company Core Mining Limited, a UK based mining company completed an exploration program on Mt. Avima to survey the quantity and quality of iron ore. The exploration program detected very significant quantities of iron ore.

Core Mining Limited constructed a 62 kilometer access road from the Cameroonian border to Mt. Avima. Construction started from existing road about 15 kilometers from the village Lele, crossing the border near an abandoned town in the Cameroonian side by the name Alati. Following this exploration program, Avima became a known world-class high grade iron ore deposit with over 700 million tonnes of JORC compliant ore which include itabirite (BIF) for direct shipping (DSO) resource.

=== Transport ===
There are two proposed railway routes.

The shortest connects this mine with a crossborder standard gauge railway of the Sundance Resources railway at Mbalam in Cameroon.

An alternative export route is with a connection via Belinga in Gabon to a junction at Booue on the existing standard gauge railway in Gabon.

== Timeline ==
=== 2014 ===
- Contracts signed to build mine, railway and port for iron ore traffic.

== See also ==
- Iron ore in Africa
- Railway stations in Congo
- Railway stations in Cameroon
- Railway stations in Gabon
