= ESAF =

ESAF or eSAF may refer to:

- Electro sustainable aviation fuel, a type of aviation biofuel
- Enhanced structural adjustment facility, a program by the International Monetary Fund
