= Railway stations in the Republic of the Congo =

Railway stations in the Republic of the Congo (Congo) include:

== Maps ==
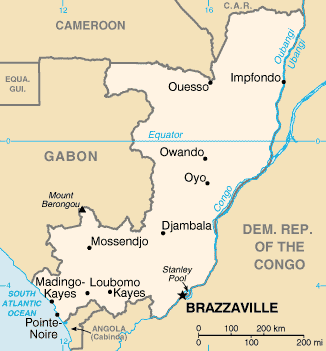
Map of the Republic of the Congo

- UN Map
- UNHCR Atlas Map
- ReliefWeb
- UNJLC Rail map of Southern Africa
  - misses line to Franceville

== Stations served by passenger trains ==
Station name	Route(s)
Bilinga	Brazzaville – Pointe-Noire railway station Loutété – Pointe Noire
Bodissa	Brazzaville – Pointe Noire; Loutété – Pointe Noire
Bouanza	Brazzaville – Pointe Noire; Loutété – Pointe Noire
Brazzaville	Brazzaville – Pointe Noire
Byiamba	M'binda – Mont Belo
Dolisie (Loubomo)	Brazzaville – Pointe Noire; Loutété – Pointe Noire
Hinda	Loutété – Pointe Noire
Kibossi	Brazzaville – Pointe Noire
Kibouende	Brazzaville – Pointe Noire
Kikembo	Brazzaville – Pointe Noire
Kimbaouka	Brazzaville – Pointe Noire; Loutété – Pointe Noire
Kimbedi	Brazzaville – Pointe Noire
Kingoyi	Brazzaville – Pointe Noire
Kipambou-Kayes	Brazzaville – Pointe Noire; Loutété – Pointe Noire
Les Saras	Brazzaville – Pointe Noire
Loualou	Brazzaville – Pointe Noire
Loudima	Brazzaville – Pointe Noire; Loutété – Pointe Noire
Loulombo	Brazzaville – Pointe Noire
Loutété	Brazzaville – Pointe Noire; Loutété – Pointe Noire
Madingou	Brazzaville – Pointe Noire; Loutété – Pointe Noire
Madzia	Brazzaville – Pointe Noire
Maïsa	M'binda – Mont Belo
Makabama	M'binda – Mont Belo
Makassou Makola	Brazzaville – Pointe Noire; Loutété – Pointe Noire
Makoko	M'binda – Mont Belo
Malemba	Brazzaville – Pointe Noire
Massembo-Loubaki	Brazzaville – Pointe Noire
Matoumbou	Brazzaville – Pointe Noire
Mayogongo	Brazzaville – Pointe Noire
M'binda	M'binda – Mont Belo
Mboukou	Loutété – Pointe Noire
Mfilou	Brazzaville – Pointe Noire
Mfoubou	Brazzaville – Pointe Noire
Mindouli	Brazzaville – Pointe Noire
Missafou	Brazzaville – Pointe Noire
Mont Belo	Brazzaville – Pointe Noire; Loutété – Pointe Noire; M'binda – Mont Belo
Mossendjo	M'binda – Mont Belo
Moubotsi	Brazzaville – Pointe Noire; Loutété – Pointe Noire
Moukondo	Brazzaville – Pointe Noire
Moukoungoulou	M'binda – Mont Belo
Moutela	Brazzaville – Pointe Noire; Loutété – Pointe Noire
Mpounga	Brazzaville – Pointe Noire
Mvoungouti	Loutété – Pointe Noire
Mvouti	Brazzaville – Pointe Noire
Nemba	Loutété – Pointe Noire
Ngabouloumou	Brazzaville – Pointe Noire
Ngoma-Tse-Tse	Brazzaville – Pointe Noire
Ngondji	Loutété – Pointe Noire
Nkayi	Brazzaville – Pointe Noire; Loutété – Pointe Noire
Nkougni	Loutété – Pointe Noire
Ntombo	Loutété – Pointe Noire
Nzombo	Loutété – Pointe Noire
Pointe Noire	Brazzaville – Pointe Noire; Loutété – Pointe Noire
Tao-Tao	Brazzaville – Pointe Noire; Loutété – Pointe Noire
Tchitondi	Loutété – Pointe Noire
Tié-Tié	Loutété – Pointe Noire
Tsessi	Loutété – Pointe Noire
Tsoumbou	Loutété – Pointe Noire
Yanga	Loutété – Pointe Noire

== Cities served by rail ==
=== Existing ===
- Pointe-Noire - port - 0 km
- Tié-Tié
- Loandjili
- Hinda, Congo
- Mvouti
- Sisansinga
- Dolisie (was Loubomo) - capital of the Niari Department - near junction to Mbinda
- Monto Bélo - junction for Mbinda
- Loudima
- Nkayi (near Kayes)
- Madingou
- Mindouli
- Kibouende
- Brazzaville - capital - 512 km

- Loutété - cement works

- Monto Bello - junction for Mbinda
- Makabana
  - Titi
- Moutamba
- Mossendjo
- Mayoko - proposed iron ore mine
- Mbinda - railhead for Franceville, Gabon and former COMILOG Cableway

=== Timeline ===
==== 2014 ====
- (1,435 mm (4 ft 8 1/2 in) Sundance Iron ore railway)
- (Republic of the Congo) Avima, Congo - iron ore mine
- Lolabe, Cameroon - port
- (This railway is isolated from the rest of the Congo railway system)

==== 2021 ====
- proposed Mayoko & Niari - Pointe-Noire railway for iron ore traffic.

=== Proposed ===
- Brazzaville - Ouesso - Constructing 1,000 km new line - 2008
- Pointe Noire - Djambala - Constructing 500 km new line - 2008
- Pointe Noire - Zanaga - New line for iron ore.
- (Republic of the Congo) (Democratic Republic of the Congo) Brazzaville-Kinshasa Bridge
- Pointe Noire - Indienne new deep-water port for iron ore export
- 2021 (Republic of the Congo) Pointe Noire - (Republic of the Congo) Mayoko & Niari - iron ore railway

=== Closed ===
(610mm gauge, isolated)

- Boma - port
- Lukula
- Tshela - terminus

== See also ==
- Transport in the Republic of the Congo
- Railway stations in DRCongo
