= Mbinda District =

Mbinda
- District
- Interactive map of Mbinda
- Country: Republic of the Congo
- Region: Niari Department

Area
  - Total: 170.8 sq mi (442.4 km^{2})

Population (2023 census)
  - Total: 3,956
  - Density: 23.16/sq mi (8.942/km^{2})
- Time zone: UTC+1 (GMT +1)

Mbinda is a district in the Niari Department of Republic of the Congo.
