= Belengi =

Belengi بلنگي
- Village
- Location within Iran
- Coordinates: 25°39′03″N 60°59′31″E
- Country: Iran
- Province: Sistan and Baluchestan
- County: Chabahar
- Bakhsh: Central
- Rural District: Pir Sohrab

Population (2006)
  - Total: 333
- Time zone: UTC+3:30 (IRST)
  - Summer (DST): UTC+4:30 (IRDT)

Belengi (Persian: بلنگي, also Romanized as Belengī; also known as Bīlīngī) is a village in Pir Sohrab Rural District, in the Central District of Chabahar County, Sistan and Baluchestan Province, Iran. According to the 2006 census, its population was 333, divided across 64 families.
