= Pointe-Noire railway station =

Pointe-Noire train station is a Congolese railway station on the Pointe-Noire-Brazzaville line. With the train station of Brazzaville, it is one of the two terminus of this line at the edge of the Atlantic Ocean, in the department of Pointe-Noire.

== Location ==
Located at a height of 14 m, Pointe-Noire station is situated at the kilometric point (PK) 0 of the Congo-Ocean railway line linking Pointe-Noire, the economic capital to Brazzaville, the political capital. This line is 515 km long. The station is located at the completion of the Avenue Charles de Gaulle, the main artery of the city. This remarkable building is a landmark and a central point in the city. The railway line in the city centre marks a clear separation between downtown activity and "la côte sauvage " (the Wild Coast beach), which remains a resort for the pontengrins.

== History ==
On September 26, 1921, the Governor General of French Equatorial Africa, Victor Augagneur, created the electoral district of the Congo-Ocean Railway (CFCO), with Loudima as its Chief location. Thus, it is the decision to build a deep-water harbor that pushes colonial administrators to abandon the historic city of Loango for the benefit of Pointe Noire. The latter is therefore chosen to be the terminus of the CFCO.

While in 1921, the first picks were given for the construction of the CFCO on the Brazzaville side, the location of the oceanic terminus of the line is not yet defined. The design of the building would be 1931 and the track was completely completed only in 1934. The set "descriptive quotation, pre-award, price list, estimate, drawings " was performed in 1933, according to the national overseas archives (ANOM).

At its official inauguration on July 10, 1934, the passenger station was not completed. The temporary station (freight station) located closer to the future port, were still be used temporarily for the travelers.

== Architecture ==
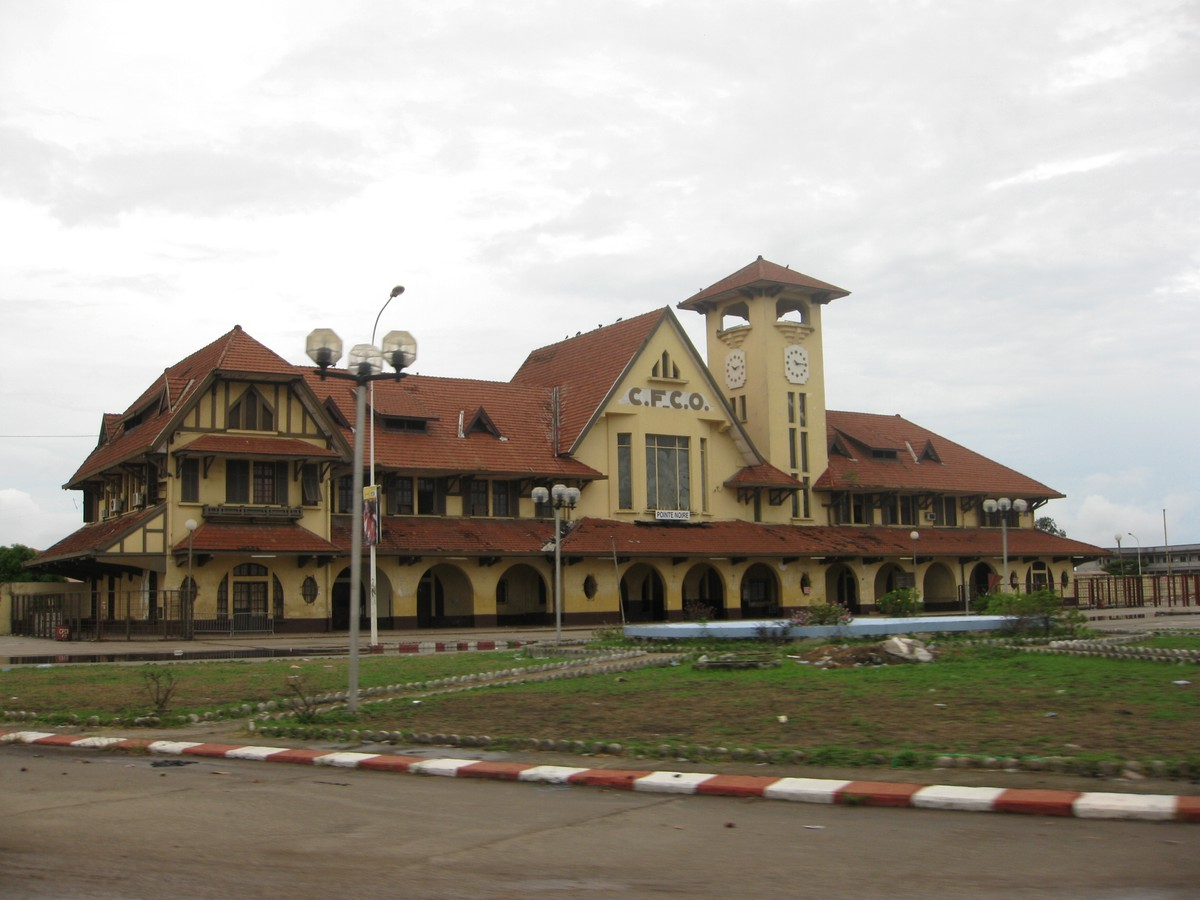
Pointe-Noire railway station in 2010

The architect of this building is Jean Philippot (1901-1988), son-in-law of Raoul Dautry (1880-1951), Director General of the State Railway Administration, between 1928 and 1937 and then appointed after the Liberation of Paris, Minister of reconstruction and urban planning from 1944 to 1946.

The other works of the architect are the Church of St. John the Evangelist of Drancy between 1933 and 1935, the Bridge station of Vanves-Malakoff in 1934, the railway station of Meudon in 1936.

Contrary to the common misconception, Pointe-Noire station is neither a "true copy" nor a "faithful replica" of Trouville-Deauville station. Their architectural similarities come from their common designer and their construction carried out at the same time. Deauville is therefore a source of inspiration, just like the Dalat railway station in Vietnam, designed by the architects, Moncet and Reveron.

It is also the era of the "Art Deco" style that is noticed in the glazing of the Central gable of the facade.

Designed on the basis of a neo-Norman style architecture, it is raised on three levels and includes a tower that dominates the entire building.

The facade is distinguished by a tower and some arcades on the ground floor. There are the Norman-style petons, with the dark vertical lines imitating the wooden panels, on the Pavilion on the left side of the facade (South end) and on the one overlooking the railroad tracks. The roofs have a small resemblance also. The cut-off roof is typical of the colonial constructions of this period.

In the past the railway station had a pediment on its North-west gable that bore the name of the city. It was followed by a small terrace, topped by a wall with fake " colombage ", a pattern from the regionalist style, and to the architect who worked in Normandy. The Northeast end therefore did not have a floor on a few meters, the roof and the false studs in opposite to those of the South-East end Pavilion.

“Viewed from the south, the right side of the façade appeared truncated, giving the building an asymmetrical appearance.” The building underwent expansion work in its northeast part between 1943 and 1949: the roof was lengthened, covering the small terrace, the pediment bearing the name of the city disappeared, as well as the motifs imitating the wooden panels. These changes, although we are not aware of the reason, have somewhat restored the balance of the facade compared to the voluminous Pavilion located in the Southwest.

== Nowadays ==
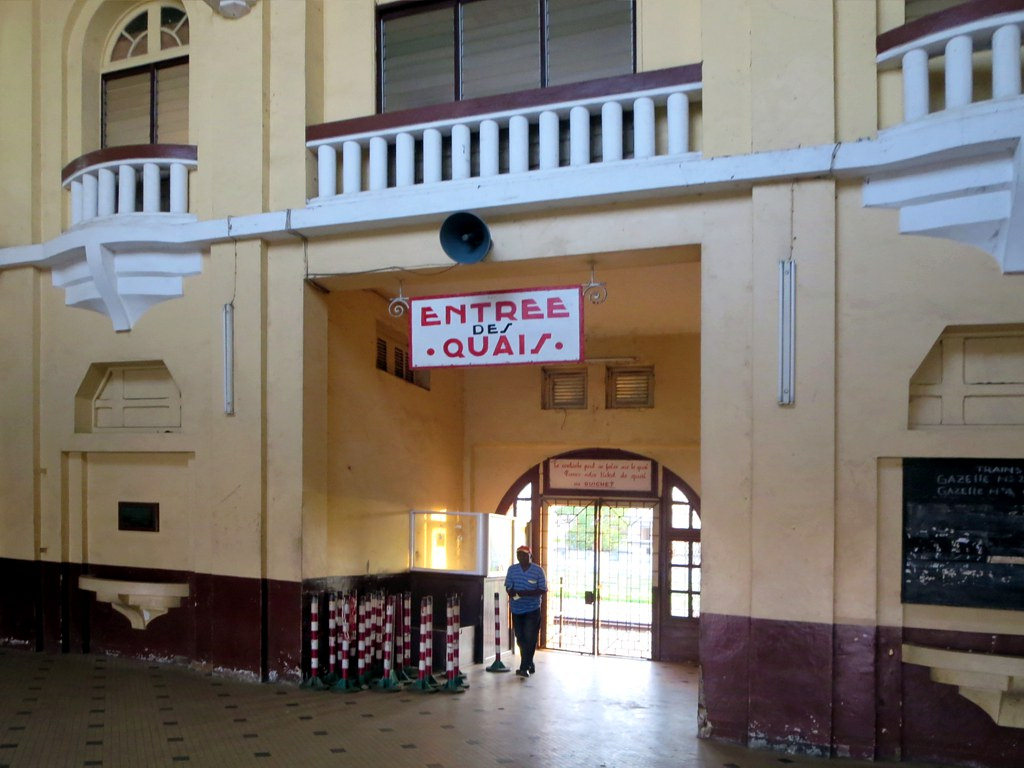
Pointe-Noire railway station- platform gateway

After several years of inactivity, a "station buffet" is again operational. Regularly interrupted by civil wars the traffic has resumed since November 2018 allowing the station to regain part of its former activity. The train's circulation had been suspended due to the war in the pool, especially since the militiamen "ninjas" had destroyed several works of art on the railroad tracks.

Being one of the first public buildings built by the colonial administration, the station remains a major tourist attraction and is undeniably the emblem of the city, despite the reluctance of the authorities regarding the shots that require authorization from the CFCO communication Department.
