= Mfouati District =

Coordinates: 4°23′38″S 13°48′54″E

Mfouati
- District
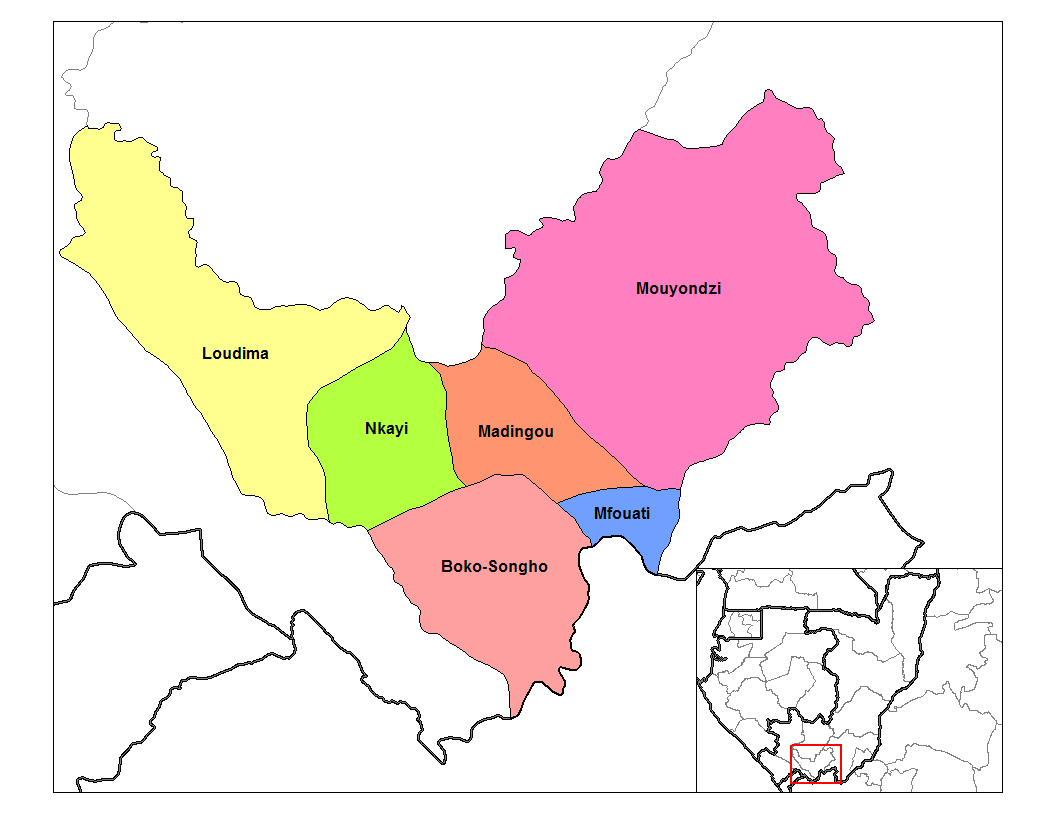
- Mfouati District in the region
- Country: Republic of the Congo
- Region: Bouenza Region

Area
  - Total: 219.5 sq mi (568.6 km^{2})

Population (2023 census)
  - Total: 33,017
  - Density: 150.4/sq mi (58.07/km^{2})
- Time zone: UTC+1 (GMT +1)

Mfouati (can also be written as Mfuati or Mfwati) is a district in the Bouenza Region of southern Republic of the Congo. The capital lies at Mfouati.
