= Moanda, Gabon =

Moanda Abu Bakry Sidik
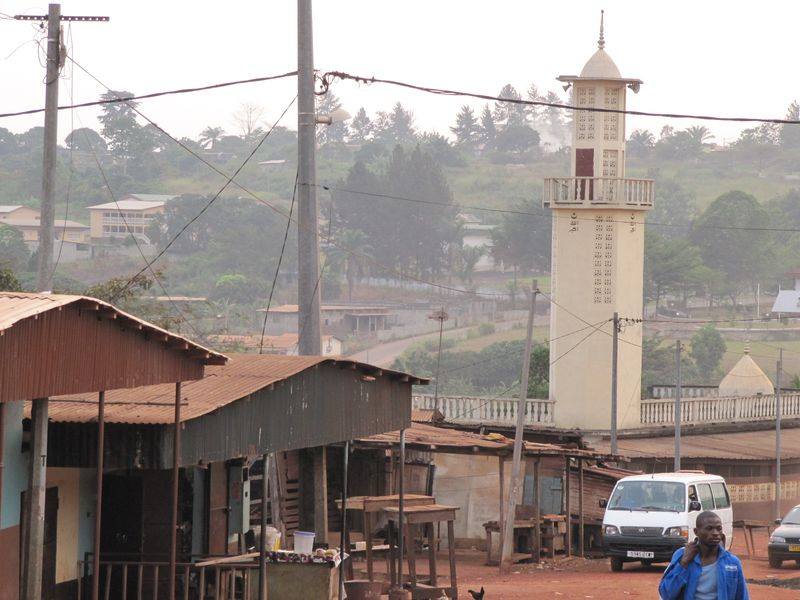

- Coat of arms

- Location in Gabon
- Coordinates: 1°34′0″S 13°12′0″E
- Country: Gabon
- Province: Haut-Ogooué Province
- Department: Lemboumbi-Leyou Department

Population (2010)
  - Total: 39,298

Moanda is one of the largest towns in Gabon, lying on the N3 road in Haut Ogooué. It is also one of the most important manganese mining towns in the world, under the auspices of the Compagnie minière de l'Ogooué (COMILOG), which began mining in 1957. Moanda had a population in 2010 of around 39,298 inhabitants and is the second largest city in the Haut Ogooué Region, after Franceville. It is also a border town, lying 100 km away from the border with the Republic of Congo.

== History ==
The development of iron metallurgy in Moanda dates back to at least 400 BCE, having likely spread to southeastern Gabon from early iron smelting centres in what is now the Central African Republic and Cameroon.

Moanda was originally a village lying on the swampy banks of the Miosso River. The discovery and exploitation of manganese in the nearby Bangombe Plateau from 1953 led to the emergence of the city.

In 1977, Moanda had an estimated 230 million tons of manganese, some one-fifth of the world's deposits.

In 1959, the 75 km COMILOG Cableway to the railway at Mbinda in the Republic of Congo was constructed to export the manganese, but it was eventually closed in 1986 when the Trans-Gabon Railway was completed. The city further grew during the 1990s owing to an influx of refugees from then war-torn Republic of Congo.

== Geography and climate ==
Moanda lies on several adjacent plateaus lying between the higher and larger Bangombe plateau in the north, and the Miosso swamp in the south. Rocky formations Mount Boundinga and Mount Moanda lie further south. The climate is equatorial, with an alternation of thunderstorms and hot temperatures between January and March, and cool temperatures from July to September.

Climate data for Moanda
Month	Jan	Feb	Mar	Apr	May	Jun	Jul	Aug	Sep	Oct	Nov	Dec	Year
Mean daily maximum °C (°F)	28.7 (83.7)	29.4 (84.9)	29.9 (85.8)	29.8 (85.6)	28.8 (83.8)	27.1 (80.8)	26.2 (79.2)	26.8 (80.2)	28.0 (82.4)	28.4 (83.1)	28.5 (83.3)	28.1 (82.6)	28.3 (82.9)
Daily mean °C (°F)	24.5 (76.1)	24.8 (76.6)	25.1 (77.2)	25.1 (77.2)	24.6 (76.3)	23.2 (73.8)	22.4 (72.3)	22.9 (73.2)	23.8 (74.8)	24.1 (75.4)	24.2 (75.6)	24.1 (75.4)	24.1 (75.4)
Mean daily minimum °C (°F)	20.2 (68.4)	20.1 (68.2)	20.2 (68.4)	20.4 (68.7)	20.3 (68.5)	19.3 (66.7)	18.5 (65.3)	18.9 (66.0)	19.6 (67.3)	19.8 (67.6)	19.8 (67.6)	20.0 (68.0)	19.8 (67.6)
Average precipitation mm (inches)	165.3 (6.51)	202.6 (7.98)	273.6 (10.77)	220.5 (8.68)	213.0 (8.39)	39.2 (1.54)	13.5 (0.53)	19.4 (0.76)	126.4 (4.98)	265.8 (10.46)	274.8 (10.82)	192.1 (7.56)	2,006.2 (78.98)
Average precipitation days	13.4	15.0	17.6	16.4	15.6	3.9	2.8	3.9	11.4	18.8	20.2	16.2	155.2
Average relative humidity (%)	74	84	84	84	84	81	81	81	84	87	87	86	83
Source: NOAA

== Divisions ==
Moanda is divided into three areas. The first area is built on the main plateau and its slopes and includes the commercial centre and populous districts Ankoula, Montagne Sainte and Fumier. The second area includes the most populous districts Alliance, Rio and L'Oasis. The third area is on the easternmost plateau and includes Lekolo and Leyima. Another plateau is home to Rigobert Landji High School, the largest high school in the city. Other districts include the Third Zone in the southwest, and the Mukaba District, on the slopes of the Bangombe Plateau.

== Economy ==
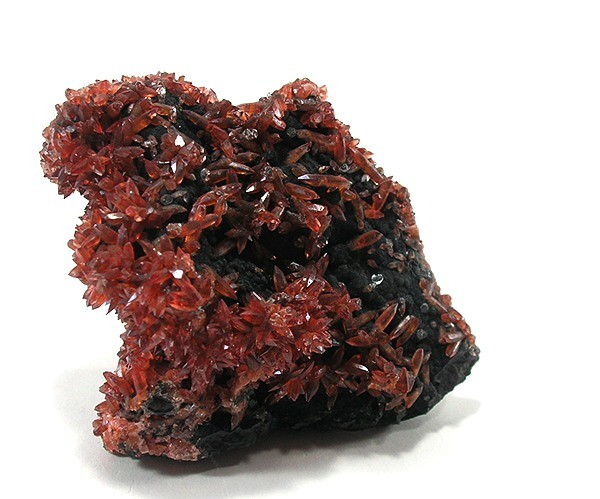
Rhodochrosite from a Moanda mine

On 24 April 1953, a joint corporation was established to mine a deposit estimated at 50 million tons of manganese ore in Gabon owned by the Bureau of Mines of Overseas France (21%), Eastern Tjbangi Mining Company (15%), Société Mokta El Hadid (15%) and the U.S. Steel (49%). A 220 miles (350 km) railway had first to be built to the coast, so full production was not expected until at least 1960. The Compagnie minière de l'Ogooué (Comilog) had initial capital of CFA 150 million. The first ore was shipped from Moanda on 2 October 1962. Moanda is now one of the largest manganese mining centres in the world. The operating company, COMILOG, exports an average 3.5 million tons of manganese a year.

This makes Gabon one of the three largest manganese exporters in the world. The manganese so far is exploited on the Bangombe Plateau (42 km^{2}).

== Education ==
French international schools include:

- Lycée Henri-Sylvoz
- École primaire Comilog

== Sport ==
The main stadium is Stade Henri Sylvoz, the home of AS Mangasport.

== Transport ==
Moanda is served by Moanda Railway Station situated outside the city, north of the Bangombe Plateau. Moanda is also home to an airfield, and lies about 50 km to Mvengue Airport, none of which, as of 2016, had any commercial airline service. The city is crossed by the N3 road and is the northern end of the Moanda-Mbinda Road, which connects Moanda to Mbinda, Congo. Moanda Railway Station is the last stop before Franceville, the southern terminus of the Trans-Gabon Railway. The road to the Republic of Congo goes between Mount Moanda and Mount Boundinga.

== See also ==
- Muanda, Democratic Republic of the Congo
- Railway stations in Gabon
