= Congo–Ocean Railway =

Public railway in the Republic of the Congo

Congo-Ocean Railway line

Overview
- Status: Operational
- Locale: Pointe Noire, Bouenza, Kouilou, Niari, Pool, Lékoumou
- Termini: Pointe Noire; Brazzaville
- Stations: 49

Service
- System: Non-Electrified
- Services: Via Dolisie

History
- Opened: 1934

Technical
- Line length: 512 km (318 mi)
- Number of tracks: 1
- Character: At-grade
- Track gauge: 1,067 mm (3 ft 6 in)
- Electrification: No
- Operating speed: 40 kilometres per hour (25 mph)
Route map

The Congo–Ocean Railway (French: Chemin de fer Congo-Océan, CFCO) links the Atlantic port of Pointe-Noire (now in the Republic of Congo) with Brazzaville, a distance of 502 kilometres (312 mi). It bypasses the rapids on the lower Congo River; from Brazzaville, river boats are able to ascend the Congo River and its major tributaries, including the Oubangui River to Bangui.

As of 2012 the railroad was regularly operating freight and passenger services along the length of the line despite the poor state of the track. A luxury passenger train, La Gazelle, using Korean-manufactured passenger cars, was introduced in 2012; as of 2014 it operated between Pointe-Noire and Brazzaville every other day, and was scheduled to take 14–16 hours to complete the 502 kilometres (312 mi) journey.

== History ==
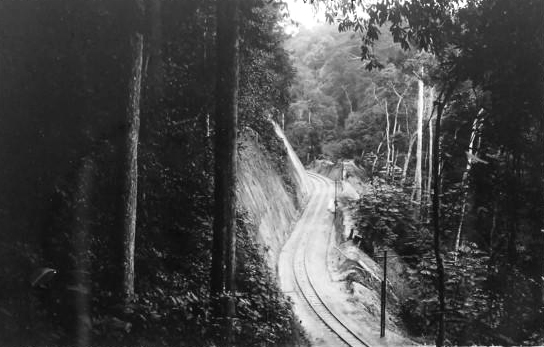
Making of the Mayumbe railway, 1930

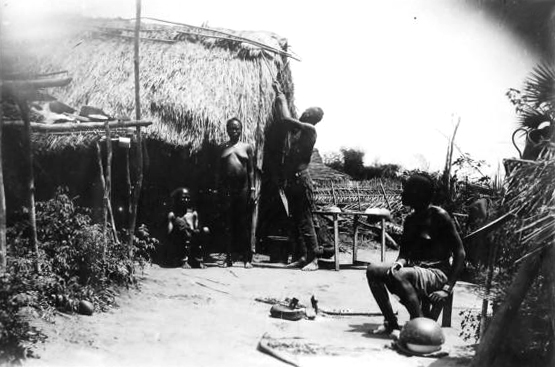
Forced labour family camp, located near Les Saras, during construction in 1930

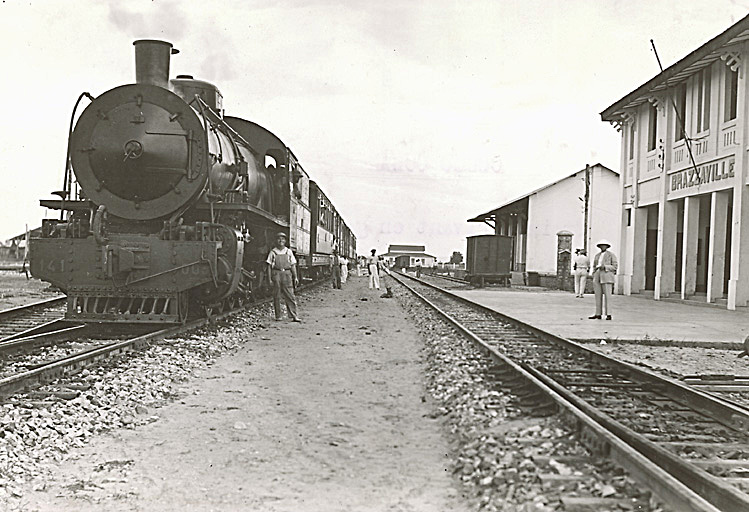
Brazzaville station, 1932

Under French colonial administration, in 1921 they contracted Société de Construction des Batignolles to construct the railway using forced labour, recruited from what is now southern Chad and the Central African Republic. Like Spain and Portugal, France did not ratify the International Labour Organization Forced Labour Convention of 1930, No. 29. Disdain among the native population towards this conscripted labour and other forms of oppression led to the Kongo-Wara rebellion between 1928 and 1931. Through the period of construction until 1934 there was a continual heavy cost in human lives, with total deaths estimated in excess of 17,000 of the construction workers, from a combination of both industrial accidents and diseases including malaria. The railroad construction was also the site of rampant physical abuse, poor housing and hygiene conditions, and extreme deprivation for the workers. In 1946, France ratified the Forced Labour Convention, in light of a permanent state of emergency, due to indigenous revolt.

In 1962, a branch was constructed to Mbinda near the border with Gabon, to connect with the COMILOG Cableway and thus carry manganese ore to Pointe-Noire. The Cableway closed in 1986 when neighbouring Gabon built its own railway to haul this traffic. The branch line remains active nonetheless.

The Congo–Ocean Railway was a user of the Golwé locomotive. Motive power is now provided by diesel locomotives.

From the start of the civil war in 1997, the line was closed for six years.

Operations restarted in 2004, but in August 2007 BBC News reported that CFCO was in a "decrepit state, with the majority of trains now broken", after UNICEF had organised a train to distribute malaria nets. In 2007, a Korean-led consortium CMKC Group signed a deal to build railway extensions to Ouesso and Djambala mainly for timber traffic.

On 21 June 2010, a train of the Congo–Ocean Railroad was involved in a major accident, in which at least 60 people were killed. The train is believed to have derailed as it went round a curve in a remote area between Bilinga and Tchitondi, throwing four carriages into a ravine. The dead and wounded were taken to hospitals and morgues in Pointe-Noire.

In 2011, it was announced that Africa Iron Ore Ltd was close to concluding a 25-year ore transport deal with Congo–Ocean. In early 2015 the Congo–Ocean Railway purchased ten locomotives from Electro-Motive Diesel in Muncie, Indiana. They were put into service by the summer of 2015.

In 2021 a proposal was announced for a Mayoko and Niari to Pointe-Noire railway made for the transport of iron ore.

== Stations served ==
Congo–Ocean Railway Chemin de fer Congo-Océan

Technical
- Line length: 512 km / 318 mi
- Track gauge: 1067 mm / 3 ft 6 in

COMILOG-Line

Technical
- Line length: 285 km / 177 mi
- Track gauge: 1067 mm / 3 ft 6 in

== Specifications ==
The line includes the 1,690-metre (1,850 yd) Bamba tunnel and 14 large reinforced concrete viaducts. The steepest eastbound gradients are 1 in 67 (1.5%), the steepest westbound 1 in 50 (2.0%). The initial locomotives were 2-8-2 tender and articulated tank engines with six driving axles. There were also 2 4-wheel petrol cars for engineers and an 18-passenger Micheline and another Micheline for the Governor General.

- Track gauge : 3 ft 6 in (1,067 mm) gauge
- Brake (railway): Vacuum brake
- Coupler: SA3 coupler

== Operations ==
The CFCO is a state-owned enterprise whose privatization was planned as part of the commitments made by the Congolese government to the World Bank and the International Monetary Fund. Among the candidates were several consortia, including Congo-Rail (Bolloré Investments, Maersk, SNCF), and the South African consortium Sheltam Mvela.

== Railway links to adjacent countries ==
- Democratic Republic of the Congo – no – same gauge 1,067 mm (3 ft 6 in) – proposed road-rail bridge.
- Angola (Cabinda) – no lines in Cabinda – same gauge 1,067 mm (3 ft 6 in) as mainland Angola
- Gabon – no – break of gauge 1,067 mm (3 ft 6 in)/1,435 mm (4 ft 8 1/2 in)
- Cameroon – no – break of gauge 1,067 mm (3 ft 6 in)/1,000 mm (3 ft 3 3/8 in)
- Central African Republic – no – no railways

== In the media ==
In 2012, the Congo–Ocean Railway was featured in an episode of the television series Chris Tarrant: Extreme Railways.

== See also ==
- Congo Railway
- Matadi-Kinshasa Railway in the Democratic Republic of the Congo.
- Railway stations in Congo
- List of countries by rail transport network size
- Transport in the Republic of the Congo
