= Mbinda =

- Location in the Republic of the Congo
- Coordinates: 2°6′5″S 12°52′38″E
- Country: Republic of the Congo
- Department: Niari
- District: Mbinda

Population (2023)
  - Total: 3,825

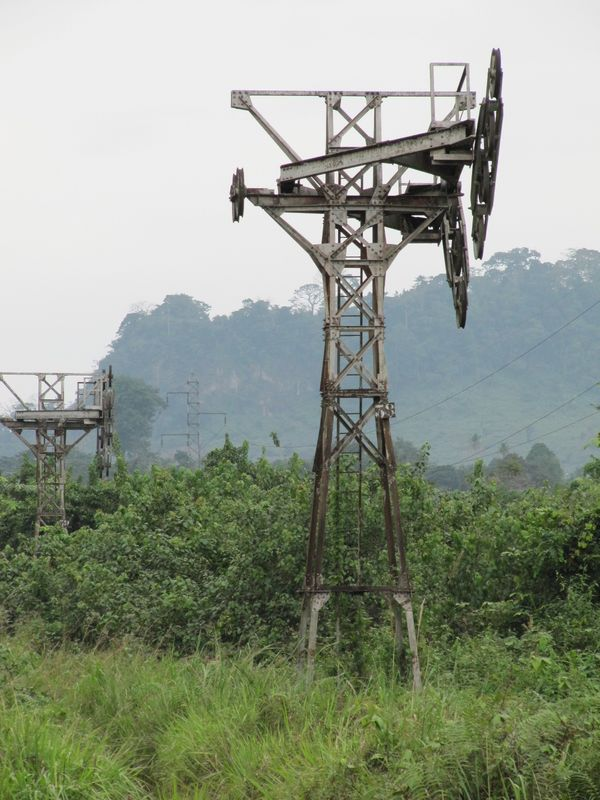
Telephone pylon in Mbinda.

Mbinda is a village in the Republic of Congo, lying on the border with Gabon. It is the administrative seat of the Mbinda District.

The village is a transport hub and lies at the end of a railway line to Brazzaville.

== Overview ==
The town prospered as the southern end of the 75 km COMILOG Cableway from Moanda in Gabon, exporting manganese via Brazzaville, but this closed in 1986 when the Trans-Gabon Railway was completed. However, a rail link from Franceville to Brazzaville, probably via the town, is regularly proposed.

== See also ==
- Railway stations in Congo
