= Timeline of Brazzaville =

The following is a timeline of the history of the city of Brazzaville, Republic of the Congo.

== 19th century ==
- 1880 – Teke trading site at Pool Malebo "ceded...to French explorer Pierre Savorgnan de Brazza;" named Ncouna.
- 1884 – Ncouna renamed Brazzaville.
- 1886 – Catholic Apostolic Vicariate of French Congo founded.
- 1892 – Sacred Heart Cathedral built.
- 1893 – Palais Épiscopal built.^{(fr)}

== 20th century ==
- 1901 – Palais du Peuple (Brazzaville) built.
- 1910 – Brazzaville becomes part of colonial French Equatorial Africa.
- 1911 – White residential Poto-Poto neighborhood established.
- 1912 – Town hall built.^{(fr)}
- 1927 – Stade Marchand (stadium) opens.
- 1929 – Urban plan created.^{(fr)}
- 1930 – Activist André Matsoua imprisoned; unrest ensues.
- 1931 – Poste Centrale (post office) built.^{(fr)}
- 1932 – Gare ferroviaire (train station) built.
- 1934 – Congo–Ocean Railway (Pointe-Noire-Brazzaville) begins operating.
- 1940
  - Brazzaville becomes capital of government-in-exile of France (Free France) during World War II.
  - October: De Gaulle visits city.
- 1943
  - Bacongo arrondissement created.
  - Basilique Sainte-Anne-du-Congo de Brazzaville (church) construction begins.
- 1944
  - Brazzaville Zoo opens.
  - January: Meeting of government-in-exile of France held in Brazzaville.
- 1945 – Population: 50,000 (approximate).
- 1948 – Victor Schoelcher monument erected.
- 1951 – École des peintres de Poto-Poto founded.
- 1953 – Vog cinema built.^{(fr)}
- 1955 – Palais de Justice (courthouse) built.^{(fr)}
- 1956 – 18 November: Moyen-Congo municipal elections, 1956 held; Fulbert Youlou becomes mayor.
- 1958 – Population: 100,000 (approximate).
- 1959 – Makélékélé and Ouenzé arrondissements created.
- 1960 – City becomes capital of independent Republic of the Congo.
- 1961 – Population: 136,200.
- 1962 – Télé Congo (television) begins broadcasting from Brazzaville.
- 1963 – City hall built.^{(fr)}
- 1965
  - Stade de la Révolution (stadium) opens.
  - July: 1965 All-Africa Games held in Brazzaville.
- 1970
  - Talangaï neighborhood created.
  - Population: 200,000 (approximate).
- 1971 – University of Brazzaville and Lycée Français Saint-Exupéry de Brazzaville (school) founded.
- 1975 – Sister/twin city agreement signed with Dresden, Germany.
- 1976 – Development Bank of the Central African States branch in business.
- 1977 – 18 March: Assassination of president Ngouabi.
- 1980
  - 5 May: Catholic pope visits city.
  - Commune of Brazzaville detaches from the Pool Department.
  - Population: 422,000 (approximate).
- 1984 – Population: 596,200.
- 1986 – Nabemba Tower built.
- 1987
  - April: 1987 Central African Games held in city.
  - Meeting of the Association Internationale des Maires Francophones held in city.
- 1989 – AS Police (football club) formed.
- 1990
  - Mfilou arrondissement officially established.
  - Population: 760,300 (estimate).
- 1994 – Centre culturel français built.
- 1996 – Population: 976,806 (estimate).
- 1997 – City taken by pro-Sassou Nguesso forces during the Republic of the Congo Civil War (1997–99).

== 21st century ==
- 2001 – December: Trial of former president Lissouba held in city.
- 2002
  - June: "Government troops battle Ninja rebels in Brazzaville."
  - Population: 1,242,857 (estimate).
- 2003 – Hugues Ngouelondélé becomes mayor.
- 2004 – July: 2004 African Championships in Athletics held in city.
- 2005 – Feux de Brazza (music festival) begins.
- 2006 – Mausolée de Pierre Savorgnan de Brazza (memorial) erected.^{(fr)}
- 2010 – Maya-Maya Airport new terminal opens.
- 2011
  - Djiri and Madibou arrondissements created.
  - Institut français du Congo active.
- 2012
  - 4 March: Brazzaville arms dump blasts.
  - 30 November: Airplane crash occurs.
- 2015
  - Kintélé Sports Complex, Palais des Sports, and Stade Municipal de Kintélé (stadium) open.
  - 4–19 September: 2015 African Games held in Brazzaville.
  - 27 September: Political protest.
  - October: Political protest; crackdown.
  - Port Authority Headquarters building constructed.
- 2016 – April: Post-election unrest.
- 2017
  - August: Christian Roger Okemba becomes mayor.
  - Long-planned project to build a Brazzaville-Kinshasa Bridge reactivated.

== See also ==
- Brazzaville history
- List of mayors of Brazzaville
- Timeline and history of Kinshasa, Democratic Republic of the Congo (city across Congo River from Brazzaville)

== Bibliography ==
in English

- Martin, Phyllis 1995, Leisure and Society in Colonial Brazzaville, Cambridge: Cambridge University Press.
- Paul Tiyambe Zeleza; Dickson Eyoh, eds. (2003). "Brazzaville, Congo". Encyclopedia of Twentieth-Century African History. Routledge. ISBN 0415234794.
- Charles Didier Gondola (2005). "Brazzaville". In Kevin Shillington (ed.). Encyclopedia of African History. Fitzroy Dearborn. ISBN 978-1-57958-245-6.
- Simon Bekker and Goran Therborn, ed. (2011), "Brazzaville", Capital Cities in Africa: Power and Powerlessness, Dakar: Council for the Development of Social Science Research in Africa, ISBN 978-2-8697-8495-6

in French

- Charles de Chavannes (1935), Note sur la fondation de Brazzaville en 1884 (in French)
- Pierre Sirven (1972). "Les industries de Brazzaville". Cahiers d'Outre-Mer (in French). 25 – via Persee.fr.
- Roland Pourtier [in French] (2000). "Brazzaville dans la guerre: crise urbaine et violences politiques" [Brazzaville in the war: urban crisis and political violence]. Annales de géographie (in French). 109. doi:10.3406/geo.2000.1901 – via Persee.fr.
- Elisabeth Dorier-Apprill (2001). "Un cycle de guerres urbaines à Brazzaville". Les Annales de la recherche urbaine (in French). 91 (91): 101–110. doi:10.3406/aru.2001.2440 – via Persee.fr.
- Robert Edmond Ziavoula, ed. (2006). Brazzaville, une ville à reconstruire (in French). Paris: Éditions Karthala. ISBN 978-2-8111-4128-8.
