= Tourism in the Republic of the Congo =

Developing industry overseen by the Ministry of Cultural Industry

Vast lanscape in Conkouati-Douli National Park, one of the country's primary ecotourism destination.

Tourism in the Republic of the Congo is a developing industry overseen by the Ministry of Cultural Industry, Tourism, Arts and Leisure. For decades, the sector was hindered by the remoteness of key locations, a complex visa regime, widespread corruption, and significant challenges in infrastructure and transportation. More recently, increased government investment in ecotourism and related infrastructure has driven growth in the sector, establishing the country as an emerging destination in Central Africa.

== History ==
The tourism industry in the Republic of the Congo originates from the African colonization period by France during the late 19th and 20th centuries.

International travel to the region was preceded by the late 19th century expeditions of Italian-born French explorer Pierre Savorgnan de Brazza in the Congo Basin, which were funded by the French government and private interests. During these expeditions, Brazza established diplomatic relations with local African leaders, culminating in an 1880 treaty with Teke chief Makoko that granted France sovereignty over the territory and laid the groundwork for the establishment of the French Equatorial Africa colonial federation in 1910.

Following the treaty, the city of Brazzaville was founded in 1883, playing a key role in the colonial administration of the region by becoming the capital of the French colony from 1900 until independence in 1960 and attracting foreign visitors; some of these visited the territory for economic reasons, mostly to trade the territories' valuable natural resources to Europe.

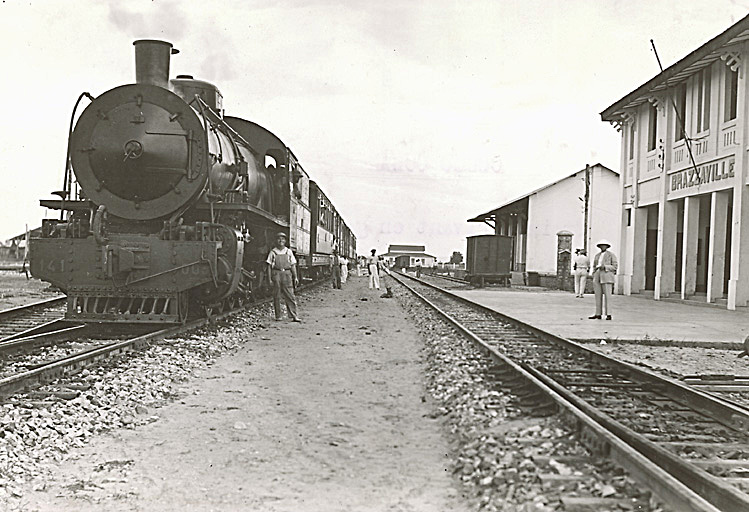
Construction of the Congo Ocean Railway in 1932

Because of this travel demand, the French government built the Congo–Ocean Railway between 1921 and 1934, linking the capital of Brazzaville to the key Atlantic port of Pointe-Noire, benefiting the European traders travelling in the region, who were able to transport their goods faster. This project became the first tangible investment aiming to improve foreign travel to the territory.

However, the tourism industry was underdeveloped for decades, having weak infrastructure and a significant lack of investment by the government, even after the country's independence from France in 1960. It was not until the 1980s that the government started to structure the ecotourism sector through the creation of national parks and reserves, as seen with the creation of the Nouabalé-Ndoki National Park in 1993 and the Conkouati-Douli National Park in 1999.

Furthermore, even after the impact of the 1st and 2nd civil wars on infrastructure during the 1990s, the ecotourism industry continued to develop, as, since 2000, the government started to establish partnerships with international NGOs such as African Parks, the World Wildlife Fund and the Wildlife Conservation Society to promote sustainable scientific tourism through the strengthening of national parks protection.

More recently, in 2016 the government proposed the adoption of a Sustainable Tourism Strategic Plan, aiming to diversify its oil-based economy by creating a fund to improve rural infrastructure, host multiple-sector training programs and bring renewable energy to tourist sites.. In 2020, USAID's Central African Regional Program for the Environment (CARPE) partnered with the government to promote sustainable ecotourism to protect the Congo Basin. In 2025 the Kempinski hotel was opened in Brazzaville, becoming the first 5-star resort in the country and developing the luxury tourism industry.

== Attractions ==
As mentioned above, the Republic of the Congo has a wide range of tourism attractions such as national reserves and parks and cultural landmarks in Brazzaville and Pointe Noire. These include:

- Nouabalé-Ndoki National Park: National Park opened in 1993; home to over 300 species of birds and animal species such as gorillas, antelopes and elephants. The park is mostly accessed by air, and tourism authorities require that tourists should be accompanied by a guide for walking and boat tours.
- Lesio Louna Reserve: Gorilla reserve located close to Brazzaville where tourists can have a close encounter with gorillas and chimpanzees.
- Odzala-Kokoua National Park: The nation's oldest national park, established in 1935 and a UNESCO World Heritage site for ecological value. It spans 1.3 million hectares and hosts gorillas, elephants and hyenas, alongside over 440 bird species.
- Basilica of Sainte-Anne-du-Congo: A Catholic basilica located in Brazzaville, built in 1949 and designed by French architect Roger Erell.
- Pierre Savorgnan de Brazza Mausoleum: Mausoleum in Brazzaville that hosts the remains of Pierre Savorgnan de Brazza, the explorer who founded Brazzaville, alongside a cultural exposition about his life that includes artifacts, paintings and sculptures.
- National Museum of Congo: Founded in 1965, the museum in Brazzaville includes historical indigenous artifacts such as masks, statues, money and knives from different regions of the country.
- Beaches of Pointe-Noire: Here tourists can rent boats, diving equipment and jet skis to journey through them.

== Gallery ==
Nouabalé-Ndoki National Park

Odzala-Kokoua National Park

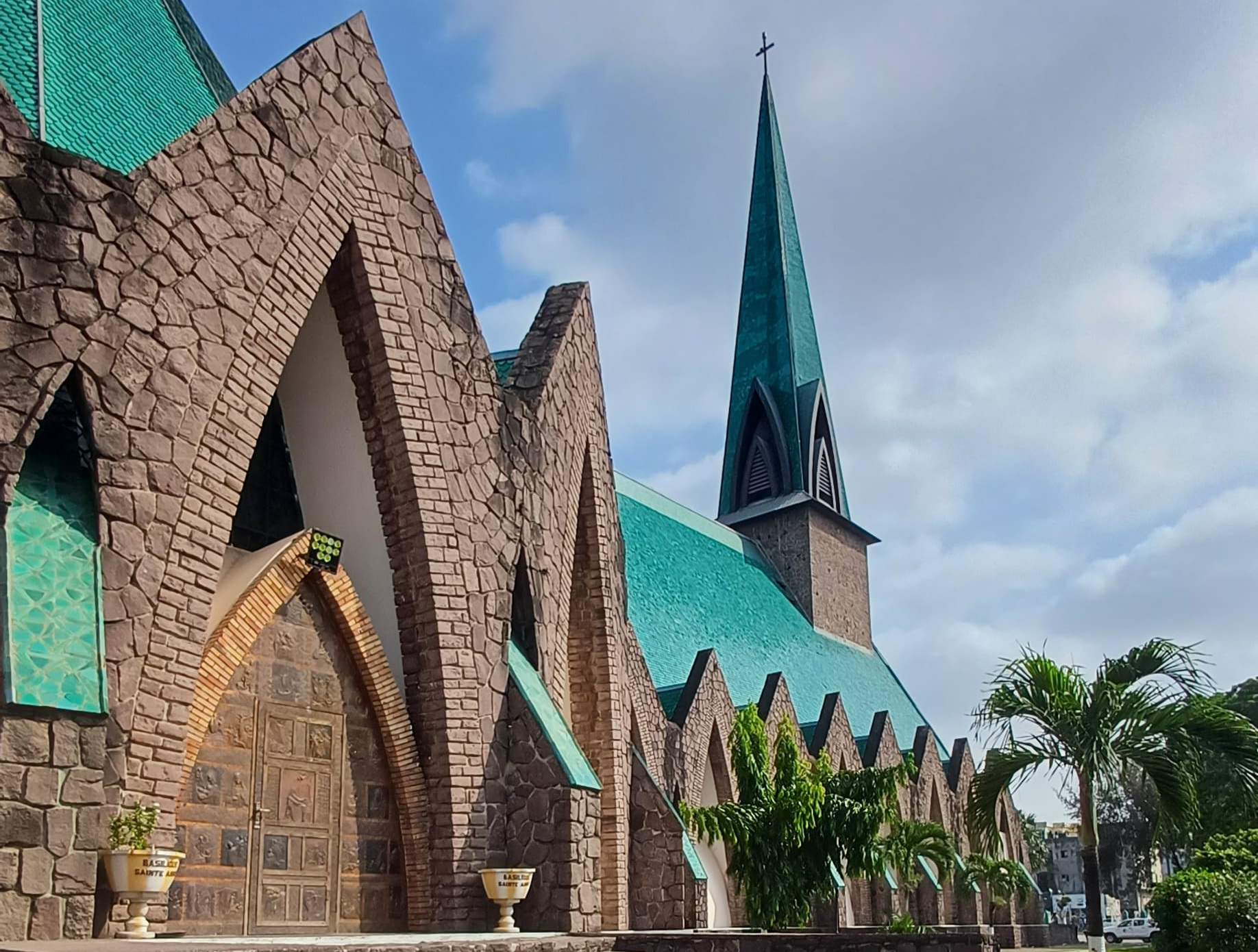
Basilique Sainte Anne du Congo

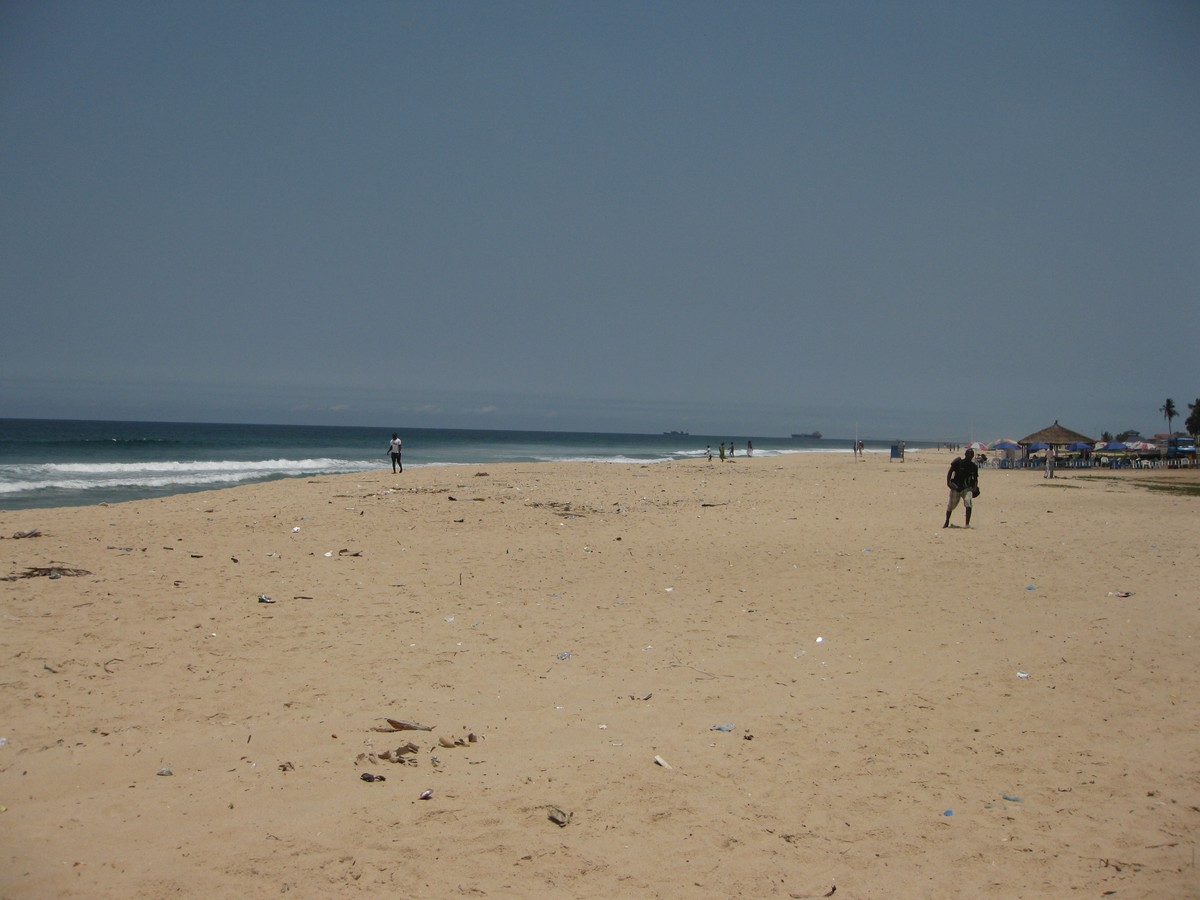
Beach at Pointe Noire.

== Statistics ==
Republic of the Congo — International tourism (1995–2018)
Year	Annual arrivals	Percentage change
1995	37,000	N/A
1996	39,000	+5%
1997	27,000	-31%
1998	20,000	-26%
1999	14,000	-30%
2000	19,000	+36%
2001	27,000	+42%
2002	22,000	-19%
2003	23,000	+5%
2004	31,000	+35%
2005	35,000	+13%
2006	46,000	+31%
2007	55,000	+20%
2008	62,000	+13%
2009	94,000	+52%
2010	194,000	+106%
2011	218,000	+12%
2012	256,000	+17%
2013	343,000	+34%
2014	226,000	-34%
2015	220,000	-3%
2016	211,000	-4%
2017	149,000	-29%
2018	156,000	+5%

Percentage change = 100×(current year arrivals / previous year arrivals – 1). The first year has no comparison. Source: CountryEconomy

Republic of the Congo — International tourism receipts (1995–2016)
Year	Tourism receipts (USD)
1995	$14.67 million
1996	$11.02 million
1997	$10.00 million
1998	$9.00 million
1999	$13.50 million
2000	$12.40 million
2001	$22.60 million
2002	$25.60 million
2003	$30.00 million
2004	$23.10 million
2005	$40.00 million
2006	$45.00 million
2007	$31.40 million
2008	$37.00 million
2009	$85.00 million
2010	$39.00 million
2011	$47.00 million
2012	$68.00 million
2013	$52.40 million
2014	$56.90 million
2015	$46.90 million
2016	$42.90 million

Source: https://www.theglobaleconomy.com/Republic-of-the-Congo/international_tourism_revenue/}

== See also ==
- Visa policy of the Republic of the Congo
- Transport in the Republic of the Congo
- Culture of Republic of the Congo
