= Lycée Saint Exupéry =

Lycée Saint-Exupéry or Lycée Antoine-de-Saint-Exupéry may refer to:

== France ==
- Lycée Saint-Exupéry (Blagnac)
- Lycée Saint-Exupéry (Marseille)
- Lycée Antoine-de-Saint-Exupéry (La Rochelle) in La Rochelle
- Lycée Saint-Exupéry (Créteil), in Créteil
- Lycée Saint-Exupéry (Mantes-la-Jolie), in Mantes-la-Jolie
- Cité scolaire Antoine de Saint-Exupéry, in Lyon

== Other countries ==
- Lycée Antoine-de-Saint-Exupéry de Hambourg, or Deutsch-Französisches Gymnasium Hamburg, Germany
- Lycée Antoine-de-Saint-Exupéry de Santiago, Chile
- Lycée Saint-Exupéry de Ouagadougou, Burkina Faso
- Lycée Français Saint-Exupéry de Brazzaville, Republic of the Congo
