= Louis Zatonga =

Republic of the Congo politician

Louis Zatonga was a Congolese politician. Zatonga was appointed one of two secretaries of the Bureau of the National Assembly in 1973. He was appointed Minister of Territorial Administration, Post and Telecommunications in 1975. When the cabinet was reshuffled in April 1977, Zatonga lost his seat in the government. He served as Mayor of Brazzaville from 1977 to 1979.

== See also ==
- List of mayors of Brazzaville
- Timeline of Brazzaville
