= Rémi Bakou =

Congolese politician

Alain Rémi Bakou was a Congolese politician. An erstwhile member of the UDDIA party, he served as general rapporteur after the 1991 National Conference. Bakou was Mayor of Brazzaville between 1993 and 1994.

== See also ==
- Mayor of Brazzaville
- Timeline of Brazzaville
