= Dominique Ntsiété =

Congolese politician

Dominique Ntsiété (25 January 1940 – 9 July 2012) was a Congolese politician. A member of the Congolese Labour Party (PCT), he served in the Senate of Congo-Brazzaville from 2002 to 2012.

== Political career ==
Ntsiété was born in Brazzaville in 1940 and joined the PCT in 1974. During the single-party regime of the PCT, Ntsiété was a member of the Revolutionary Court of Exception. He served for a time as Administrator-Mayor of Bacongo, a district of Brazzaville.

Years later, in July 2002, Ntsiété was elected to the Senate as a PCT candidate in Brazzaville. As of 2003, he was Treasurer of the Collective of Brazzaville Senators. He was re-elected to the Senate in October 2005 as a PCT candidate in Brazzaville. He received the votes of 58 electors, placing first and therefore winning the first of Brazzaville's six available seats.

As of 2007, Ntsiété was the Deputy Coordinator of the Collective of Brazzaville Senators. At the PCT's Sixth Extraordinary Congress, held in July 2011, Ntsiété was elected to the PCT's 471-member Central Committee.

In the October 2011 Senate election, Ntsiété was re-elected to the Senate as a candidate of the Rally of the Presidential Majority (RMP) coalition in Brazzaville. He headed the local PCT committee in Bacongo at the time of the election. He died in Paris on 9 July 2012 at age 72 and was buried at a Brazzaville cemetery on 21 July 2012.
