= Gregoire (chimpanzee) =

Africa's oldest chimpanzee

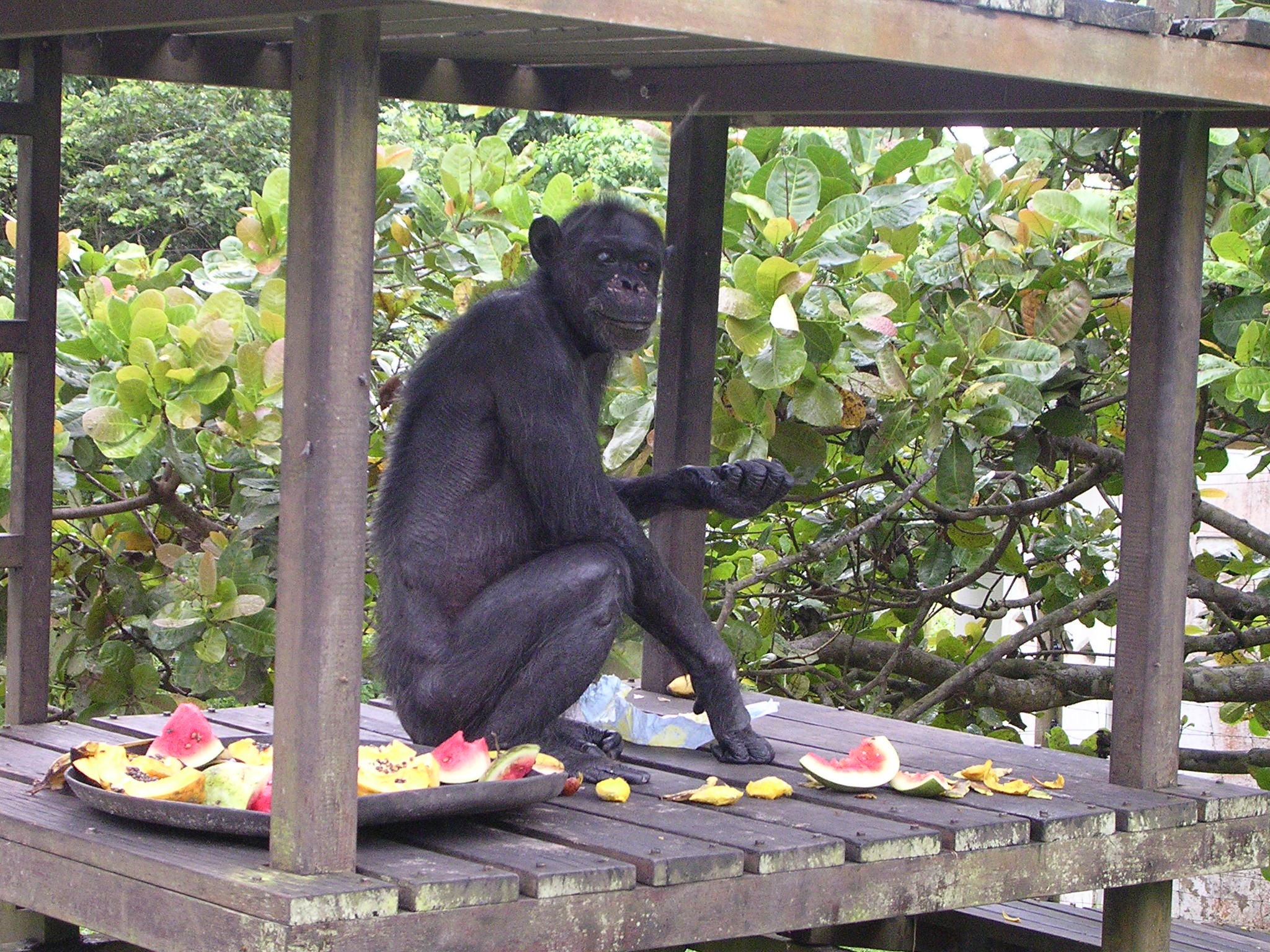
- Gregoire, pictured in 2006
- Species: Chimpanzee
- Sex: Male
- Born: c. 1942
- Died: December 17, 2008 (aged 65–66)
- Known for: Being the world's oldest known chimpanzee at the time of his death

Gregoire (c. 1942 – December 17, 2008) was, up until his death, Africa's oldest known chimpanzee. For the last eleven years of his life, he was a resident of the Tchimpounga Sanctuary (part of the Jane Goodall Institute) in the Republic of the Congo. He was observed to have a pair bond relationship with the chimpanzee Clara. Previously he had been confined by himself for more than 40 years in a cage at the Brazzaville Zoo before being rescued by staff of the Jane Goodall Institute and airlifted to the Sanctuary during a time of war.

== Death ==
He died in his sleep in his bed of eucalyptus leaves at the Sanctuary's rehabilitation centre on December 17, 2008, aged 66. Gregoire was known around the world as an old chimpanzee, appearing on the cover of National Geographic magazine in 1995, in a BBC special, and in an Animal Planet film, Jane Goodall's Return to Gombe.

== See also ==
- Oldest hominids
- List of individual apes
