= Ile Mbamou =

- District
- Interactive map of Ile Mbamou
- Coordinates: 04°16′10″S 15°16′16″E
- Country: Republic of the Congo
- Department: Brazzaville Department

Area
  - Total: 273.7 km^{2} (105.7 sq mi)

Population (2023 census)
  - Total: 7,547
  - Density: 27.57/km^{2} (71.42/sq mi)
- Time zone: UTC+1 (GMT +1)

Ile Mbamou is the only district of the Brazzaville Department of Republic of the Congo.

== See also ==
- Mbamu
