= Djiri (Brazzaville) =

Arrondissement in the Republic of Congo

Coordinates: 4.1619°S 15.2794°E

Djiri is one of the arrondissements of Brazzaville, the capital of the Republic of Congo.

It is the newest arrondissement of Brazzaville (created in 2011). It is divided into 7 quarters.
