= Hugues Ngouelondélé =

Republic of the Congo politician (born 1961)

Hugues Ngouélondélé is a Congolese politician who was Mayor of Brazzaville from 2003 to 2017. He also served as a Deputy in the National Assembly of Congo-Brazzaville beginning in 2002. He has served in the government as Minister of Sports since 2017.

== Political career ==
Ngouélondélé is a son of General Emmanuel Ngouelondélé, who was a leading figure in the regime of President Denis Sassou Nguesso prior to 1992. Hugues Ngouelondélé graduated from the Marien Ngouabi University in Brazzaville with a degree in law in 1983 and subsequently studied in Algeria, France, and Belgium. He worked in the customs administration and represented Congo-Brazzaville at the World Customs Organization in March 1999.

In the May–June 2002 parliamentary election, he was elected to the National Assembly as an independent candidate in the second constituency of Moungali, located in Brazzaville; he won the seat in a second round of voting. In June 2002, he was elected as a municipal councillor in Brazzaville at the head of an independent candidate list in Moungali. He then became Mayor of Brazzaville in February 2003, succeeding Benoît Moundélé-Ngollo.

In the June 2007 parliamentary election, Ngouélondélé was again elected to the National Assembly as an independent candidate in Moungali II constituency; he won the seat in the first round with 50.20% of the vote. Following the 29 June 2008 local elections, Ngouelondélé was re-elected as Mayor of Brazzaville by the city council on 30 July 2008. Nicéphore de Saint Eudes Fylla unsuccessfully challenged him for the position.

Although his father became a determined opponent of Sassou Nguesso during the multi-party era, Ngouélondélé has remained loyal to Sassou Nguesso. He married Ninelle Nguesso, a daughter of Sassou Nguesso, while his sister Michèle married Sassou Nguesso's nephew Edgar.

In the July–August 2012 parliamentary election, Ngouelondélé was a candidate in Gamboma—a constituency located in Plateaux Department, rather than Brazzaville—where he faced an opposition leader, Mathias Dzon. Standing as the candidate of the Congolese Labour Party (PCT) in Gamboma I constituency, Ngouelondélé was elected in the first round with 54.88% of the vote.

Standing as a PCT candidate, Ngouelondélé was elected as a local councillor in Moungali in the September 2014 local elections. He was re-elected for another five-year term as Mayor, without opposition, by the city council on 23 October 2014. He received 92 votes from the 100 councilors who voted.

In the July 2017 parliamentary election, Ngouelondélé stood unopposed as a candidate in the first constituency of Gamboma, with no other candidates standing in the constituency. Following the election, Sassou Nguesso appointed Ngouelondélé to the government as Minister of Sports and Physical Education on 22 August 2017. Christian Roger Okemba was elected to succeed Ngouelondélé as Mayor of Brazzaville on 24 August 2017.

== See also ==
- List of mayors of Brazzaville
- Timeline of Brazzaville
