= Mayor of Brazzaville =

The following is a list of mayors of the city of Brazzaville, Republic of the Congo. The Republic of the Congo became independent of French colonial rule in 1960.

- Fulbert Youlou (1956)
- Dominique Nzalakanda (1956–1959)
- Simon Bilondo (1956–1961)
- Joseph Senso (1961–1963)
- Jean-Louis Mamimoué (1963–1965)
- Hervé Joseph Mayordome (1965–1969)
- Lambert Galibali (1969–1974)
- Pascal Ockyemba Morlende (1974–1977)
- Louis Zatonga (1977–1979)
- André Obami Itou (1979)
- Gabriel Emouengue (1979–1984)
- Jean Jules Okabando (1984–1991)
- Gabriel Obongui (1991–1992)
- Clément Mampouya (1992–1993)
- Raymond Alain Bakou (1993–1994)
- André Bakala (1994)
- Bernard Kolélas (1994–1997)
- Dévoué B. Boukaka Ouadiabantou (1997)
- Aimé Emmanuel Yoka (1997–1999)
- Benoit Moundélé-Ngolo (1999–2003)
- Hugues Ngouelondélé (2003–2017)
- Christian Roger Okemba, since 24 August 2017

== See also ==
- Timeline of Brazzaville
