= 1956 Moyen-Congo municipal elections =

Local elections in the Republic of the Congo

Municipal elections were held for the first time in Moyen-Congo on 18 November 1956. Voting took place in three municipalities; Brazzaville, Pointe-Noire and Dolisie. The Democratic Union for the Defence of African Interests won the polls in all three municipalities. Fulbert Youlou became mayor of Brazzaville.
