= 15th arrondissement of Marseille =

- Municipal arrondissement
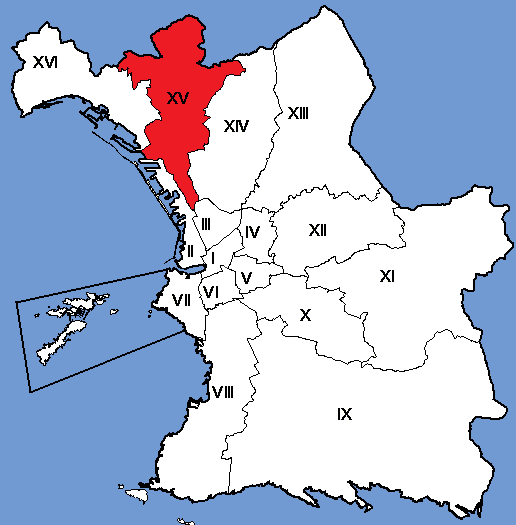
- Location within Marseille
- Interactive map of 15th arrondissement of Marseille
- Coordinates: 43.3628°N 5.3678°E
- Country: France
- Region: Provence-Alpes-Côte d'Azur
- Department: Bouches-du-Rhône
- Commune: Marseille

Government
  - Mayor (2020–2026): Nadia Boulainseur (DVG)
- Area: 16.90 km^{2} (6.53 sq mi)
- Population (2023): 79,161
  - Density: 4,684/km^{2} (12,130/sq mi)
- INSEE code: 13215

The 15th arrondissement of Marseille is one of the 16 arrondissements of Marseille. It is governed locally together with the 16th arrondissement, with which it forms the 8th sector of Marseille.

== Population ==
Historical population
Year	Pop.	±% p.a.
1968	80,311	—
1975	96,587	+2.67%
1982	89,229	−1.13%
1990	74,543	−2.22%
1999	71,140	−0.52%
2007	77,770	+1.12%
2012	80,808	+0.77%
2017	75,901	−1.25%
2023	79,161	+0.70%
Source: INSEE

Neighbourhood	Population (2022)
Les Aygalades	6,075
Les Borels	2,226
La Cabucelle	8,801
La Calade	6,753
Les Crottes	3,686
La Delorme	6,437
Notre-Dame Limite	11,528
Saint-Antoine	7,291
Saint-Louis	11,732
Verduron	8,301
La Viste	6,665

== Education ==
- Lycée Saint-Exupéry

== Restaurant ==
Marseille's 15th arrondissement ranks second among areas most affected by unhealthy eating—driven by the proliferation of fast-food outlets—according to a study by Urssaf.
