= Dominique Tchimbakala =

Congolese journalist and television presenter (born 1977)

- Born: Tchimbakala (born 1977); France
- Citizenship: Congo
- Education: Saint-Exupéry High School; University of Paris X-Nanterre; HEC Paris
- Occupations: Journalist; Television presenter; news anchor
- Employers: Nantes; Centre for Training and Development of Journalists in Paris (CFPJ); France 2; France 5; BFMTV; Jeune Afrique; Jeune Afrique on TV5Monde
- Awards: Global Association of French High School Alumni (Union-ALFM).

Dominique Tchimbakala (born 1977) is a Congolese journalist and television presenter, who is a news anchor for TV5Monde.

== Biography ==
Tchimbakala was born in France to parents who were originally from the Republic of Congo. In 1987, the family returned to the Republic of Congo and she attended Saint-Exupéry High School in Brazzaville. She returned to France to study for a BA in History and an MA in Political Science at University of Paris X-Nanterre. In 2021, she graduated from HEC Paris with an Executive MBA.

Tchimbakala presented for local television in Nantes before moving to work at the Centre for Training and Development of Journalists in Paris (CFPJ). Since 2000, she has worked for a number of French media organisations, including: France 2, France 5, BFMTV, Jeune Afrique. In 2017, she became a news anchor for Jeune Afrique on TV5Monde, which is the most popular French-language news programme in Africa. She has been outspoken about the lack of black workers in news production in France.

In 2018, she was appointed as the President of the Global Association of French High School Alumni (Union-ALFM).
