= Talangaï =

Arrondissement in the Republic of Congo

Coordinates: 4°13′S 15°17′E

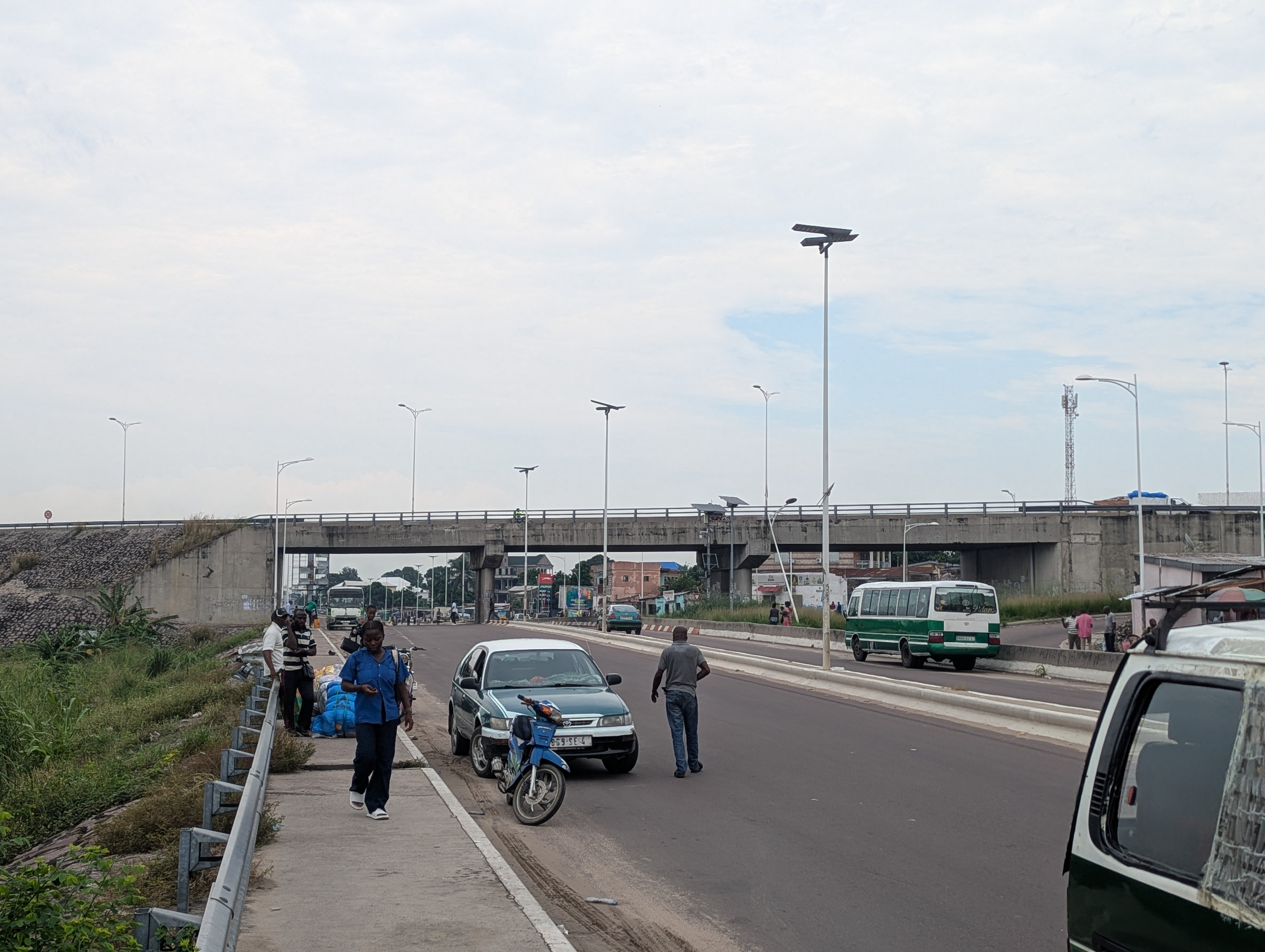
Talangaï dans la ville de Brazzaville

Talangaï is one of the arrondissements of Brazzaville, capital of Republic of Congo.
