= Lycée Saint-Exupéry (Marseille) =

Public school in Marseille, France

Coordinates: 43.3467°N 5.3542°E

Location
- 15th arrondissement of Marseille, France

Information
- Type: Sixth-form college/senior high school
- Established: 1957
- Nickname: Saint-Ex

Lycée Saint-Exupéry, nicknamed Saint-Ex, is a sixth-form college/senior high school in the 15th arrondissement of Marseille, France.

As of 2013 the attendance zone of Saint-Exupéry covers those of nine different junior high schools (collèges).

== History ==
It began construction in 1957, when there was a "baby boom" in the Marseille area. It was originally called Lycée Nord.

In 2013 Sylvia Zappi of Le Monde described the school as a "lycée ghetto", saying that staff members used that name.

That year former teacher Franck Baillot stated that only poor families attend the school; Zappi stated that wealthier families in the area tried their best to make sure their children did not attend the school. As of 2013 40% of residents in the high school attendance zone who apply to go to sixth-form/senior high through the Affelnet procedure were assigned to Saint-Exupéry, but the school only received 19% of the students who could have applied, based on previous year attendance in the corresponding high school zone.

As of 2015 80 female students, making up about 5% of the student body, remove veils before going to classes.

Teachers went on strike in 2016.

== Campus ==
It includes a boarding (internat) facility.

In 2008 a new wing was added to the building.
