= Madibou =

Arrondissement in the Republic of Congo

Coordinates: 4°18′29.3″S 15°10′55.5″E

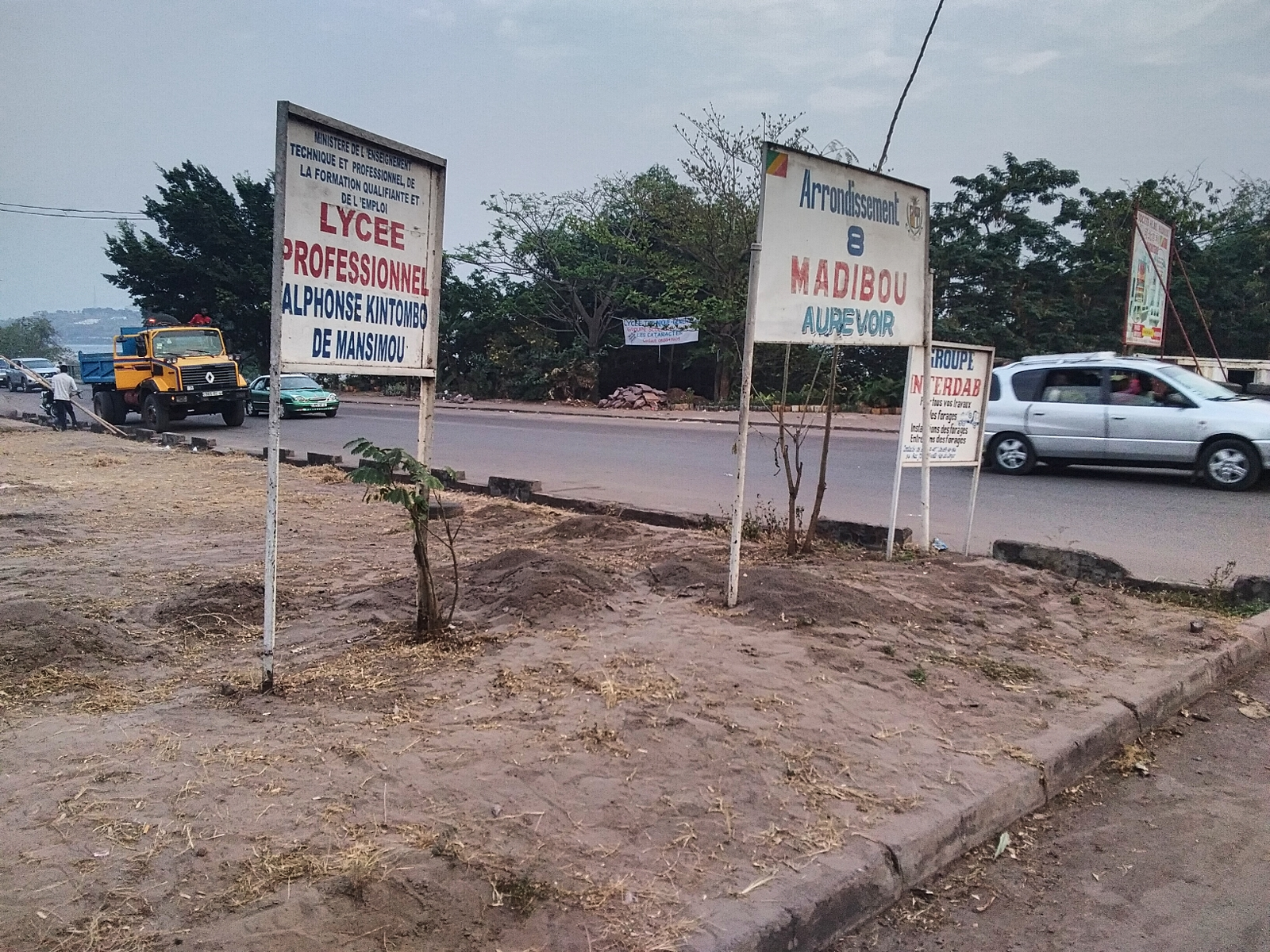
Signs in Madibou.

Madibou is one of the arrondissements of Brazzaville, capital of Republic of Congo.
