= Basilica of Sainte-Anne-du-Congo in Brazzaville =

Basilica of Sainte-Anne-du-Congo
- Basilica of Sainte-Anne-du-Congo in Brazzaville
- Basilique Sainte-Anne-du-Congo
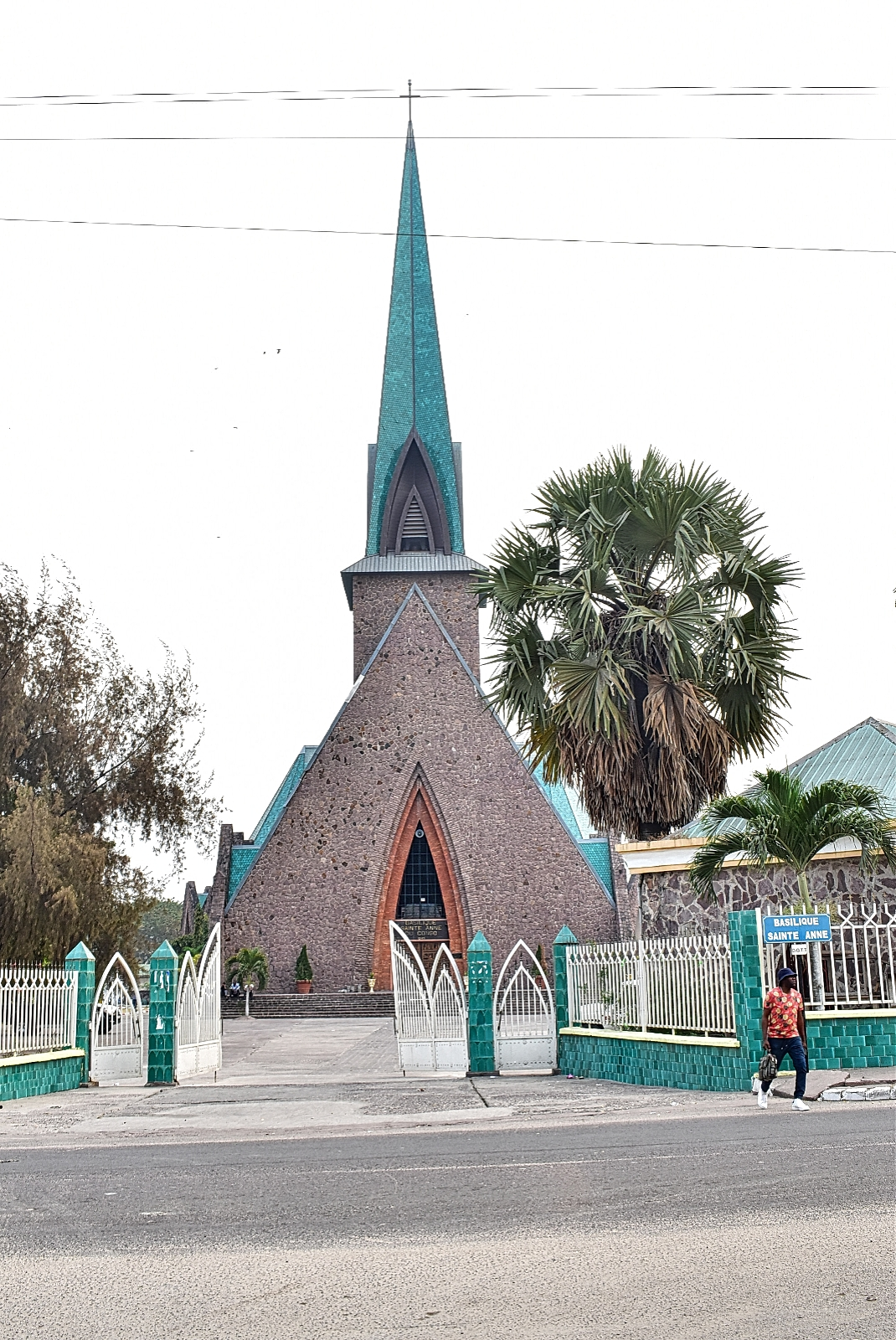
- The church in 2023
- Interactive fullscreen map
- 4°16′07″S 15°17′04″E
- Country: Republic of the Congo
- Denomination: Roman Catholic

History
- Status: Active

Architecture
- Architect: Roger Erell
- Style: Modern architecture
- Completed: 1943

Administration
- Diocese: Brazzaville

The Basilica of Sainte-Anne-du-Congo (French: Basilique Sainte-Anne-du-Congo) is a monumental Catholic church in Brazzaville, Republic of the Congo.

== Construction ==
The church was completed in 1943. The architect was Roger Erell.

== History ==
Denis Sassou Nguesso, President of the Republic of the Congo, attended a Requiem Mass at the church on 25 April 2025 rather than attending the funeral of Pope Francis at the Vatican. Other officials in attendance at the mass included First Lady Antoinette Sassou Nguesso, Prime Minister Anatole Collinet Makosso, President of the Senate Pierre Ngolo, the President of the National Assembly Isidore Mvouba.
