= Nabemba Tower =

Office skyscraper in Brazzaville, Republic of the Congo

Coordinates: 4°16′20″S 15°17′21″E

- Nabemba Tower in 2010

General information
- Status: Completed
- Type: Office
- Location: Brazzaville, Republic of the Congo
- Construction started: 1983
- Completed: 1986

Height
- Roof: 106 m (348 ft)

Technical details
- Floor count: 30

Design and construction
- Architect: Jean Marie Legrand

The Nabemba Tower (French: Tour Nabemba) , also known as Elf Tower, is a skyscraper in Brazzaville, Republic of the Congo, located directly on the Congo River in the south of the city. At 106 metres and 30 floors it is the tallest building in the Republic of the Congo. It is named after Mont Nabemba, the highest mountain in the country. The tower was built with borrowed funds from the French oil company Elf Aquitaine.

The tower was designed by Jean Marie Legrand during the government's five-year plan and was built between 1983 and 1986. Various ministries and charities' offices are housed in the tower, such as the African Self-help Development Initiative, the New Partnership for African Development, and UNESCO. Nabemba Tower was inaugurated by President Denis Sassou Nguesso on 3 February 1990.

== Criticism ==
Nabemba Tower was severely damaged in 1997 during the Republic of the Congo Civil War. When President Sassou Nguesso returned to power, however, the building was rebuilt at the cost of £6,000,000. This was more than the entire initial construction cost. Elf Aquitaine funded work on the building, which was assigned to a start-up company in Congo led by two French brothers without any qualifications in company management, nor in the techniques of building construction, civil engineering, or even architectural expertise.

Each year, the maintenance alone of the tower costs the equivalent of £3,000,000, a significant cost for what is still a relatively poor country. The local architect Norbert Mbila describes Nabemba Tower as "a symbolic building, built purely for prestige. It is neither necessary nor useful, as it swallows up a lot in maintenance costs."
