= Roger Erell =

French architect and resistance fighter

Roger Erell (9 April 1907 – 1 January 1986) (the pseudonym Erell -RL- comes from the initials of his real name), was a French architect and resistance fighter.

== Early life ==
Erell was born Roger Lelièvre in Mansle (Charente) in 1907.

== Works in Brazzaville ==
- He is known principally for the Basilica of Sainte-Anne-du-Congo in Brazzaville

His other works include:

- Case de Gaulle (1942).. (originally a guesthouse for distinguished visitors, now Residence of the French ambassador to Brazzaville) fr:Case de Gaulle
- Maison commune de Poto-Poto (1942-1943)
- Palais de l'Artisanat (1943) (destroyed in 1985, except for the facade. with a fresco of Africa)
- Stade Félix Éboué (1944) next to the basilique sainte Anne
- Phare de Brazza (1944, 1952)
- Pavillon principal de la Cité Pasteur (1948)
- Basilique Sainte-Anne du Congo (1949)
- Lycée Savorgnan de Brazza (1949-1952)
- Arcades de l'Avenue Foch (with fr:Jean-Yves Normand) (1949-1954)
- Trésor public (formerly fr: Banque internationale pour l'Afrique occidentale (1950)
- Building Paternelle (avec Jean-Yves Normand) (1953)
- Banque Belge d'Afrique (now Société Générale) (1954)
- Maison d'arrêt
- Clinique Grosperrin, now included in the'État-Major.
- former-Hôtel Impérial
- DST (formerly, Caisse Centrale de la France Libre)
- Faculté de droit of Marien Ngouabi University - formerly -CEG Bouboutou (formerly Centre d'études supérieures)

== Death ==
Erell died in Vallauris (Alpes-Maritimes) in 1986.
