= Brazzaville Zoo =

Republican Congo Zoologist

- Interactive map of Brazzaville Zoo
- Date opened: 1944
- Location: Brazzaville, Republic of the Congo
- Website: https://zoolandia.cg

The Brazzaville Zoo (French: Le parc zoologique et botanique de Brazzaville) is a zoo located in Brazzaville, Republic of the Congo. It has been in existence since at least 1944, as this is the most widely accepted date of assembly. They are known to be a very unsanitary zoo, and have extremely low animal rights ratings, although this is common across zoos in Africa. They house a number of species including crocodiles, deer, bongos, foxes, leopards, reptiles and numerous primates including chimpanzees and gorillas and (Old World monkeys. During the Congolese Civil War, many animals were evacuated from the zoo to numerous zoos, sanctuaries, and preserves across Central Africa.

== Gregoire the Chimpanzee ==
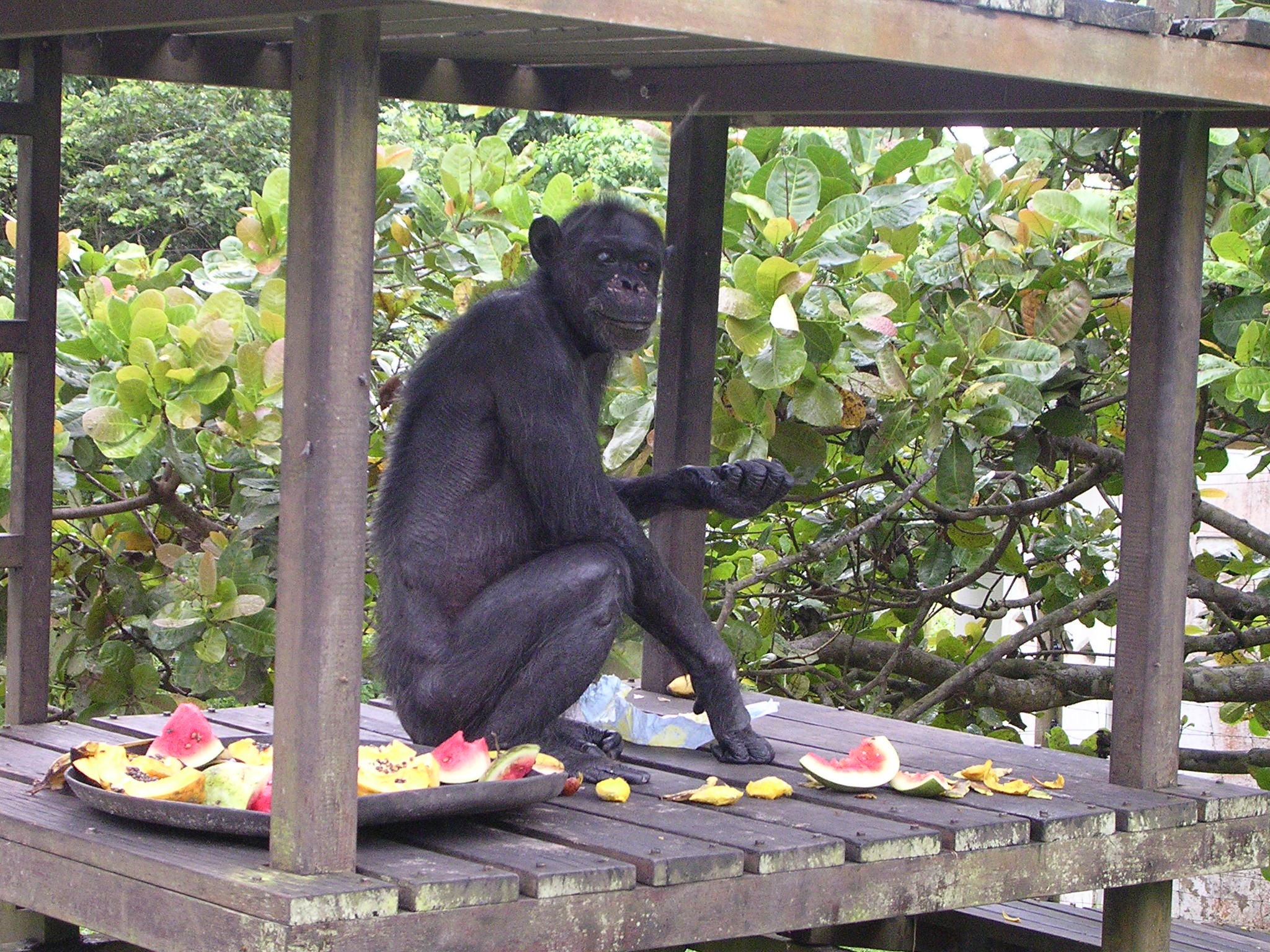
Gregoire after his rescue

Gregoire the chimpanzee was the record-holder of the oldest chimpanzee in the world. He was first exhibited in the zoo as early as 1944. His first documentation came when Jane Goodall visited the zoo in 1990, and saw that Gregoire was suffering from dire malnutrition and severe skin infections. After this encounter, Dr. Goodall intervened, assigning a special caretaker for Gregoire and implementing a diet program. In 1996, Gregoire enclosure received two new chimpanzees in order for him and the other primates to enjoy the company. Soon after, in 1997, the Congolese Civil War escalated, and due to the zoo's proximity to the Brazzaville International Airport, shelling and gunfire could be heard loudly. Gregoire was known to dive under his sheets as each shell fired. Staff hastily transported many of the zoo's primates to Pointe Noire, and later to a special preserve area in Tchimpounga. At his new home Gregoire found sanctuary, and lived the rest of his life with other chimpanzees and with human love and care. He died in 2008 of old age.
