= Lycée Français Saint-Exupéry de Brazzaville =

Location
- Coordinates: 4.284384°S 15.251501°E

Information
- Established: 1971
- Website: lycee-saintexbrazza.org

Lycée Français Saint-Exupery de Brazzaville (est. 1971) is a French international school in Brazzaville, Republic of the Congo. It serves levels maternelle (preschool) through lycée (senior high school).
