= Bacongo (Brazzaville) =

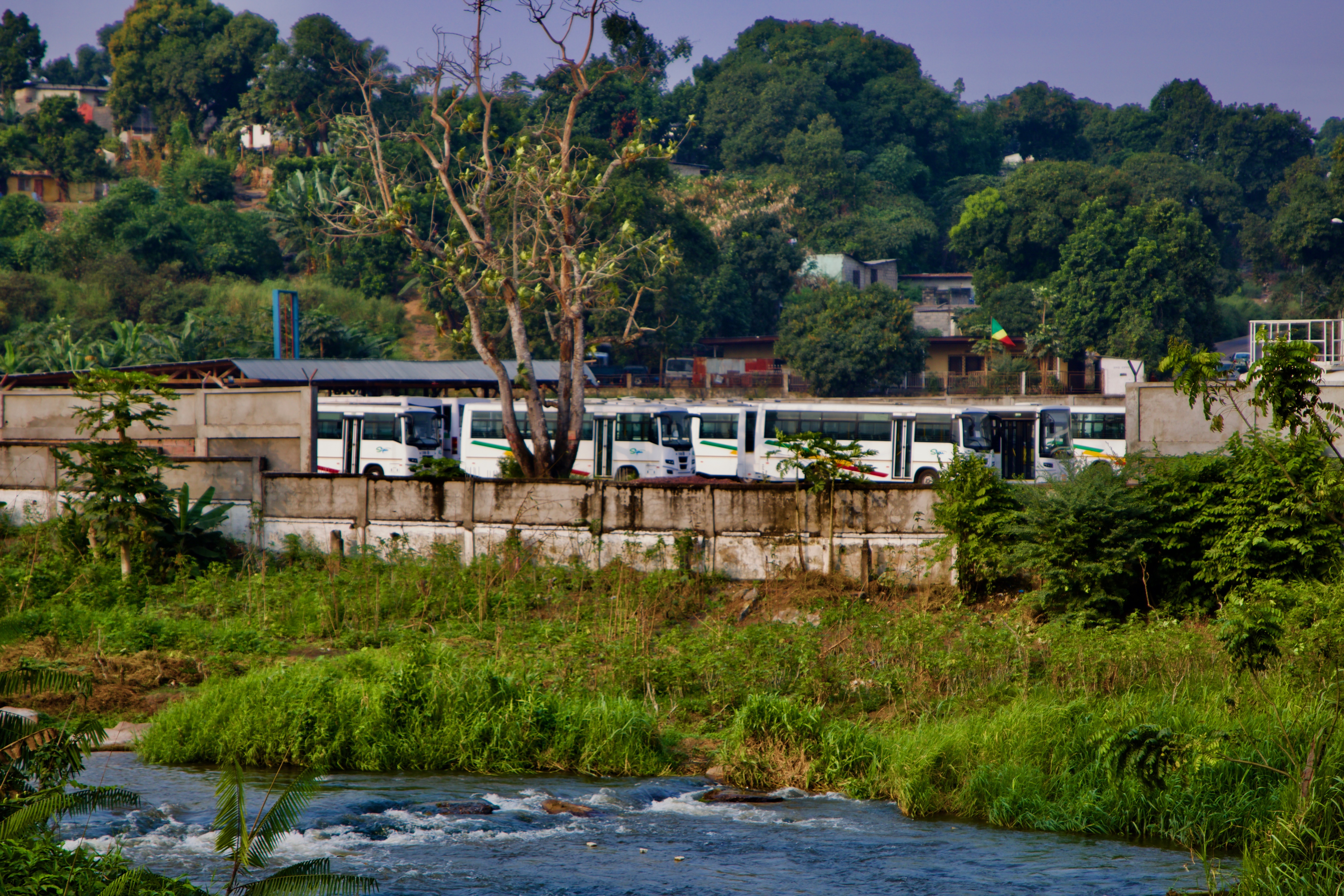
Bus in Bacongo

Bacongo is one of the arrondissements (boroughs) of Brazzaville, the capital of Republic of Congo.

Bacongo is located on the bank of the Congo River with Kinshasa, the capital of the DRC.

Inside of Bancongo, the scenic Brazzaville Corniche starts and ends. The French Ambassador's house, also known as the Case de Gaulle, is also located in Bacongo.
