= Brazzaville =

Capital city of the Republic of the Congo

Brazzaville: Mavula, Kintamo, etc. (Kongo); Mfa, Mfoa, etc. (Ibali Teke)
- Capital city
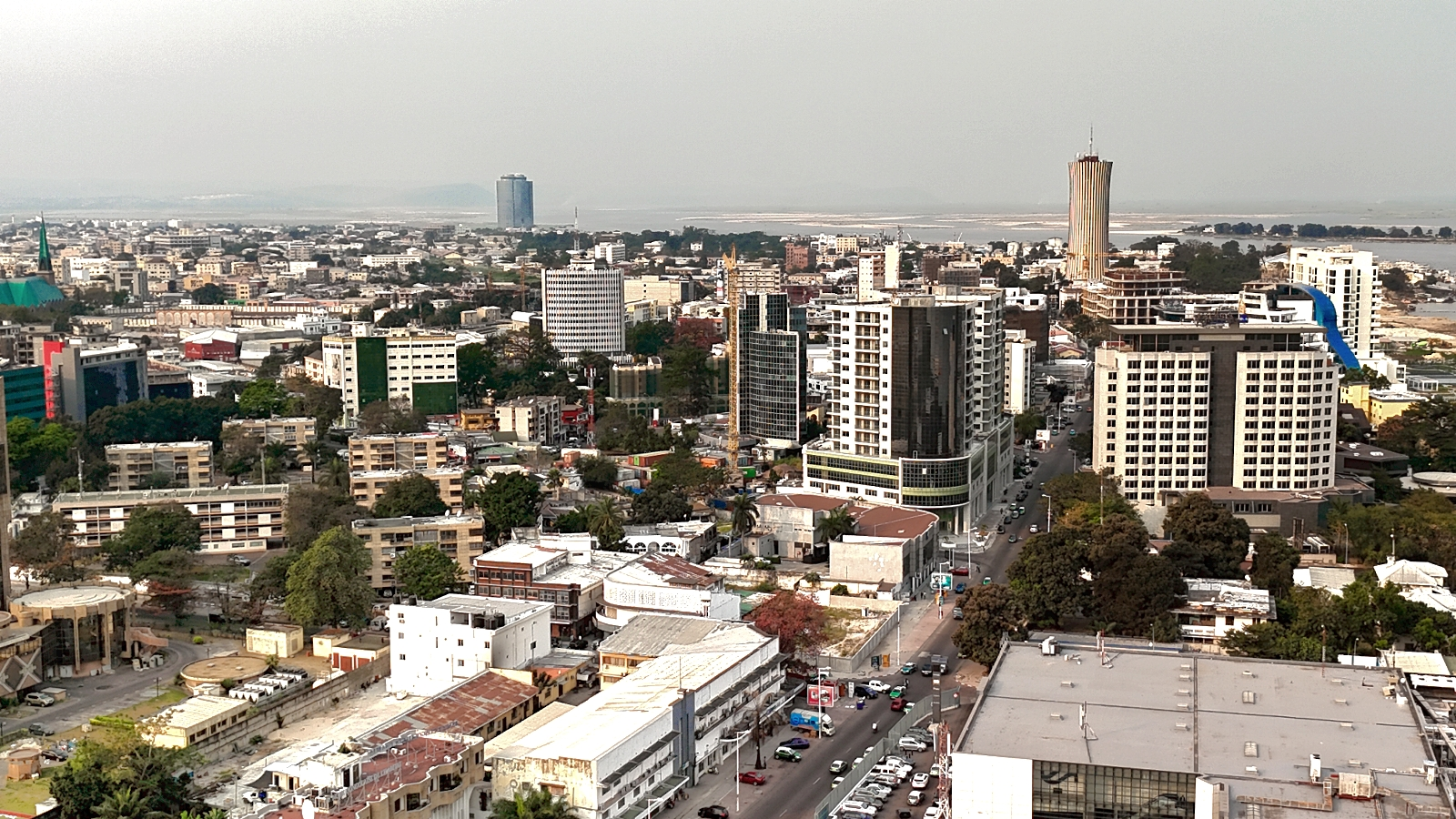
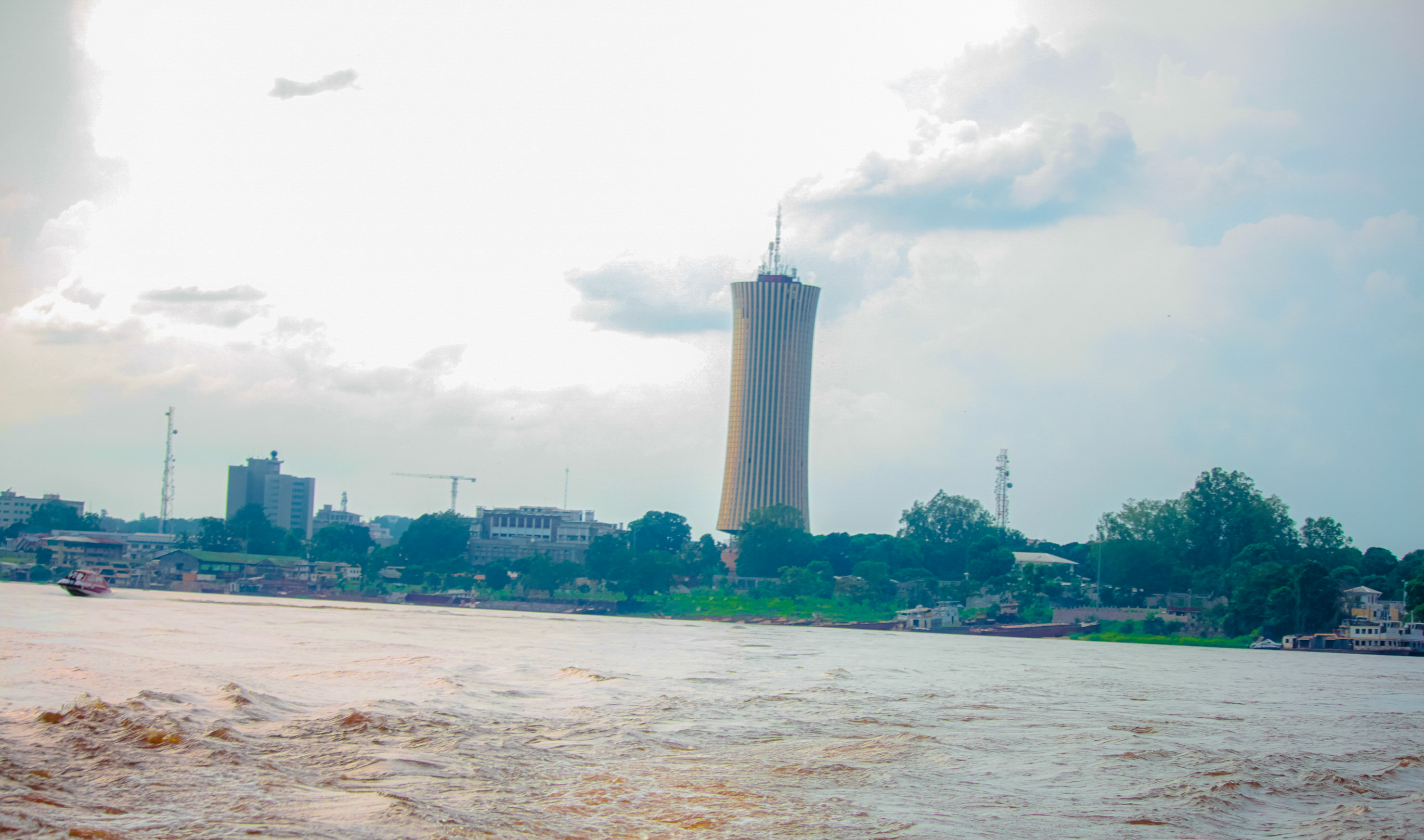
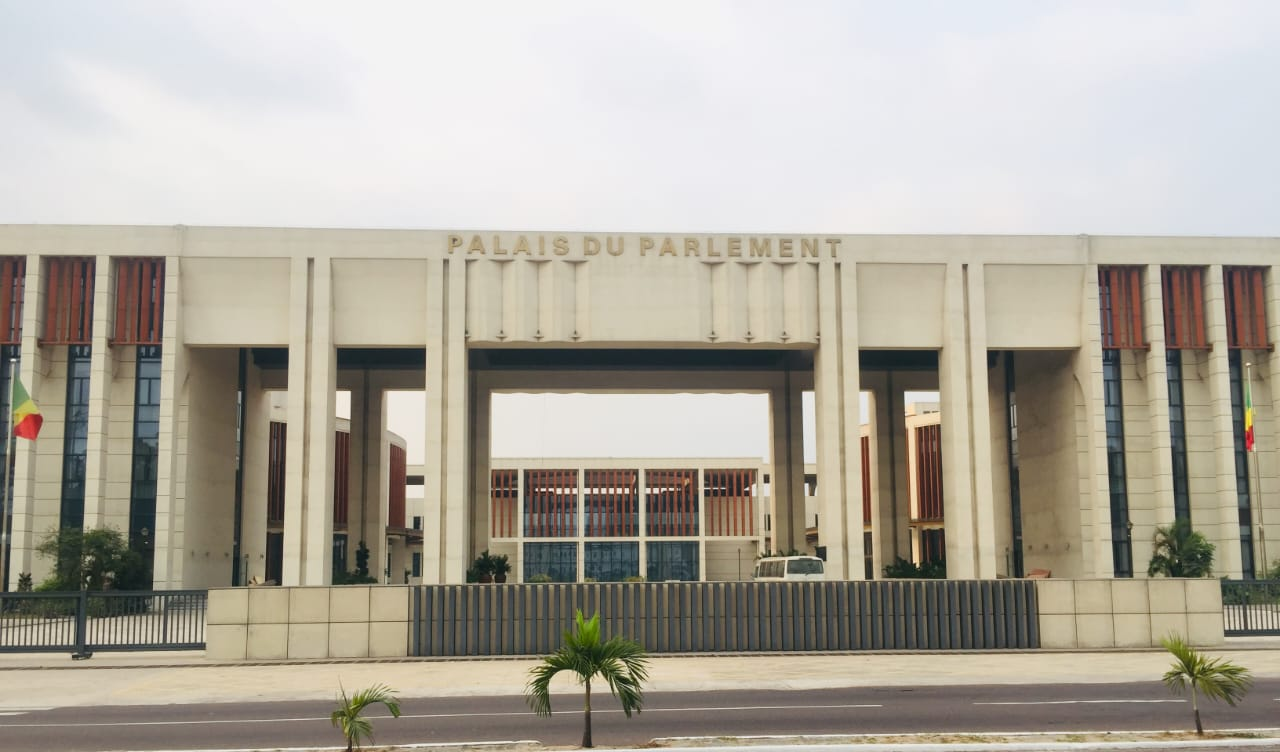
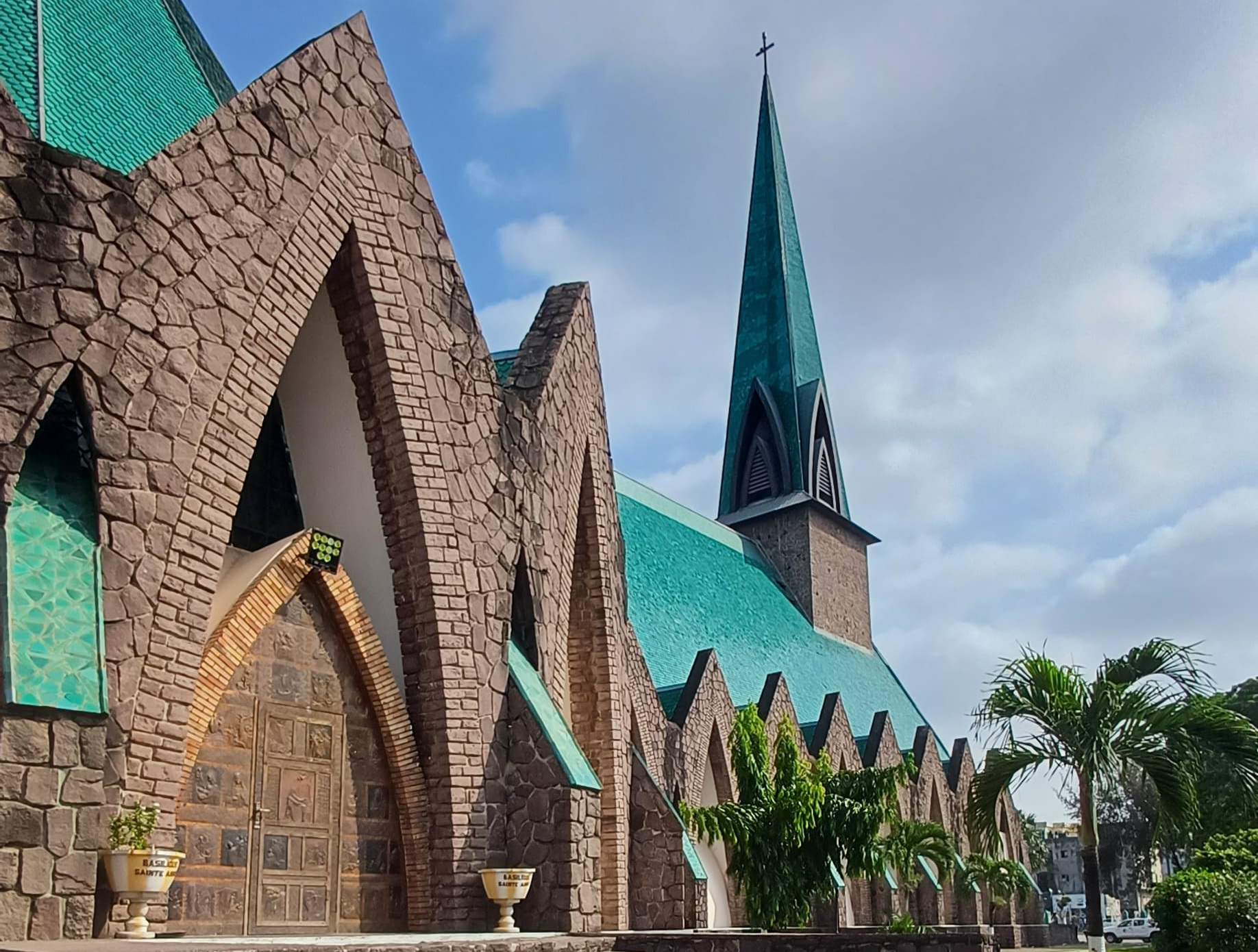
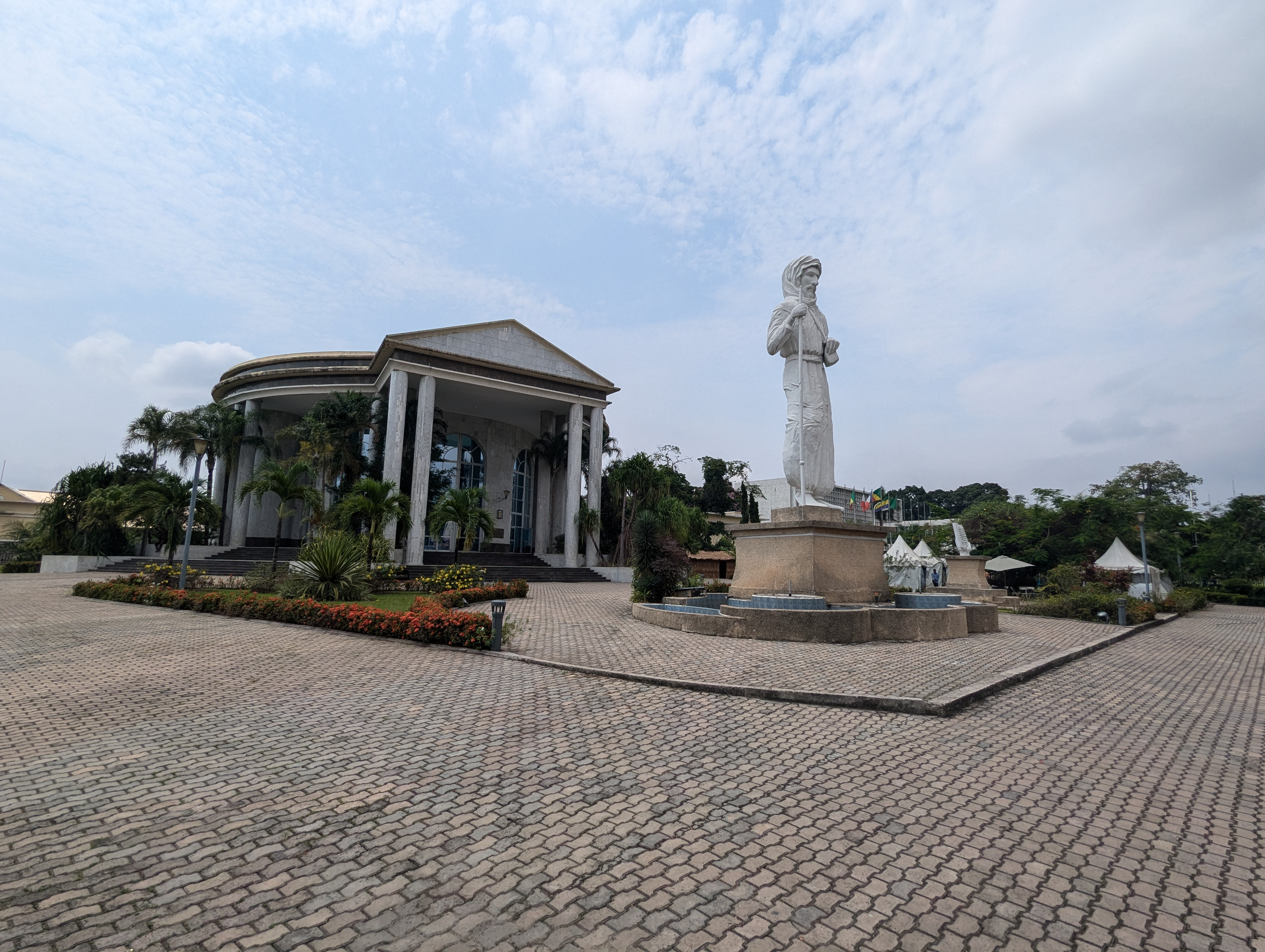
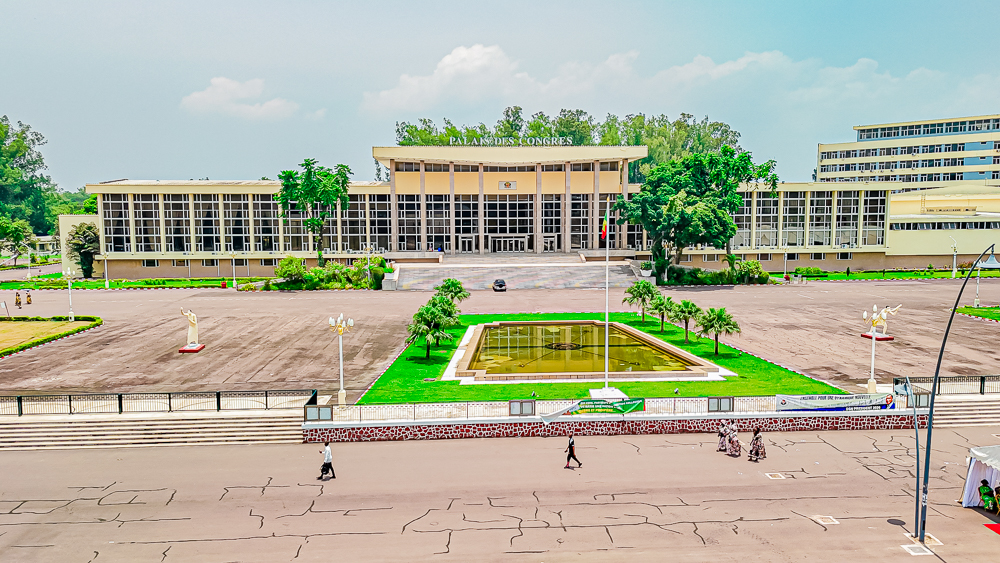
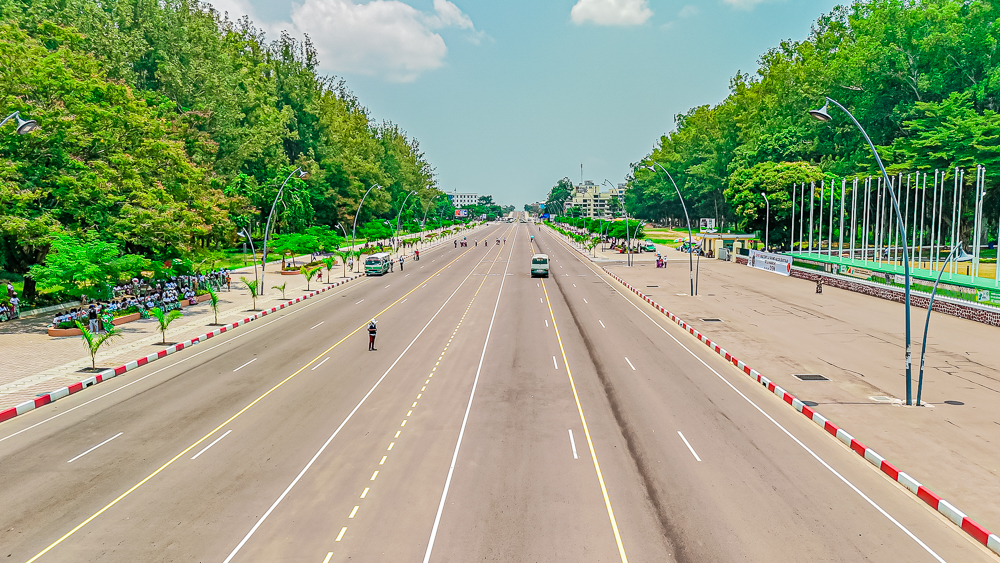
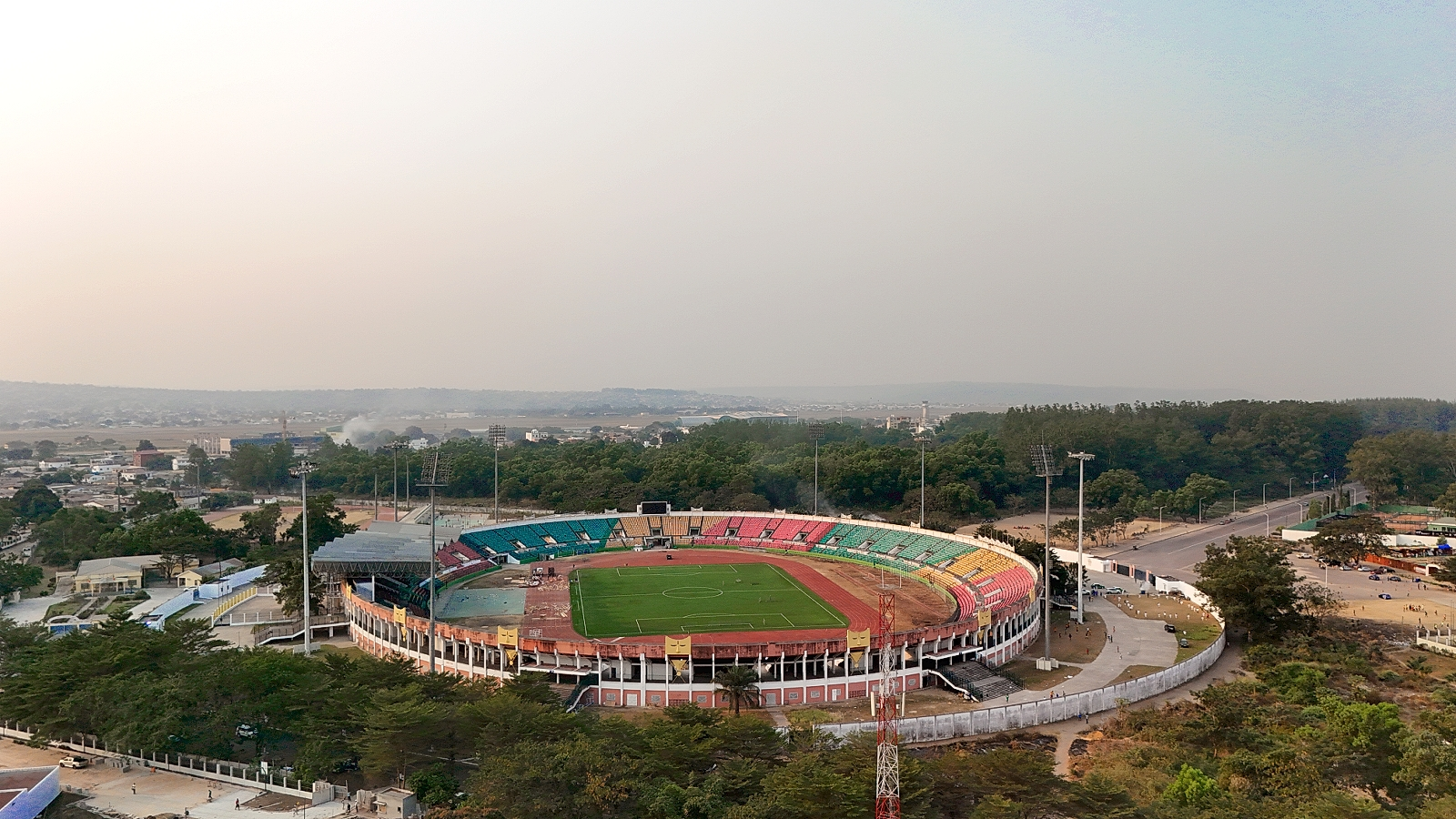
- Skyline of Brazzaville Nabemba Tower Parliament Palace Basilica of Sainte Anne Brazza Mausoleum Palais des Congrès Boulevard Alfred Raoul Stade Alphonse Massemba-Débat

- Coat of arms
- Interactive map of Brazzaville
- Location within Republic of the Congo Location within Africa
- Coordinates: 4°16′S 15°16′E
- Country: Republic of the Congo
- Capital district: Brazzaville
- Department: Brazzaville
- Commune: Brazzaville
- Founded: 1883
- Founder: Pierre Savorgnan de Brazza

Government
  - Mayor: Dieudonné Bantsimba

Area
  - Capital city: 588 km^{2} (227 sq mi)
- Elevation: 320 m (1,050 ft)

Population (2023)
  - Capital city: 2,138,236
  - Density: 9,450/km^{2} (24,500/sq mi)
  - Urban: 2,813,480
  - Metro: 3,190,743
  - Official language: French
  - National languages: Kituba; Lingala; Non-national language : Ciladi
- Demonym: Brazzavillian
- Time zone: UTC+01:00 (WAT)
- Area code: 242
- HDI (2023): 0.705 · high · 1st of 12
- Climate: Tropical savanna climate (Aw)
- Website: www.brazzaville.cg

Brazzaville (French pronunciation: [bʁazavil]) is the capital and largest city of the Republic of the Congo. Administratively, it is a department and a commune. Constituting the financial and administrative centre of the country, it is located on the north side of the Congo River, opposite Kinshasa, the capital city of the Democratic Republic of the Congo (DR Congo).

The population of the capital is estimated to exceed 2.1 million residents, comprising more than a third of the national populace. Some 40% are employed in non-agricultural professions. During World War II, Brazzaville served as the de facto capital of Free France between 1940 and 1942.

In 2013, Brazzaville was designated a City of Music by UNESCO; since then it has also been a member of the Creative Cities Network.

== Toponymy ==
The prefix "Brazza" comes from the surname of the Italian-French explorer Pierre Savorgnan de Brazza, who worked on exploration expeditions for France and is credited with founding the town.

The place name Brazzaville unintentionally has the literal meaning of 'city of the armed wing'. The surname Brazza refers to the village of Brazzacco, in the commune of Moruzzo, Italy, whose name derives from the Latin bracchium, meaning 'armed wing'.

In the Kongo language it has the names or variants of Ntamo, Ntambo, Kintamo, Kintambo, Tandala, and Mavula, and in the Teke languages M'fa, Mfaa, Mfa, and Mfoa.

== Geography ==
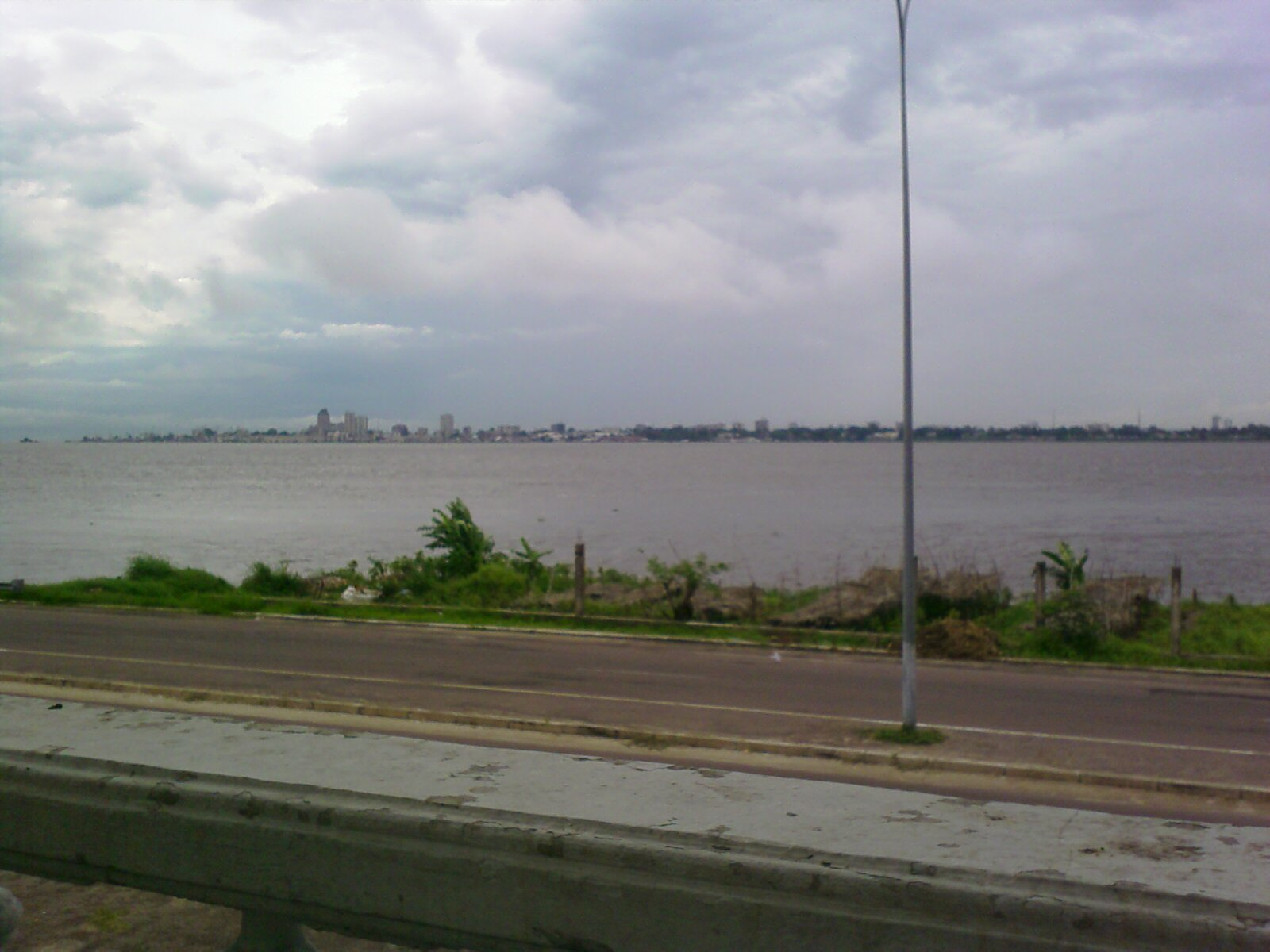
Kinshasa seen from Brazzaville. The two capitals are separated by the Congo River.

Brazzaville covers a large area to the north of the Congo River, just below the Pool Malebo. Mbamu, a large island within the Pool, is part of the Republic of Congo's territory.

Brazzaville is 506 km (314 mi) inland from the Atlantic Ocean and approximately 474 km (295 mi) south of the equator. Around the city are large plains. The town is relatively flat, and situated at an altitude of 317 m (1,040 ft). Downriver the Congo has numerous rapids, known as Livingston Falls, preventing navigation upriver to this point from its mouth at the Atlantic.

Kinshasa, the capital of the Democratic Republic of the Congo, is located on the southern bank of the Congo, directly across from Brazzaville. To distinguish between the two African countries that have "Congo" in their names, the Republic of the Congo is sometimes called Congo-Brazzaville, as opposed to Congo-Kinshasa. Kinshasa is more than five times larger than Brazzaville in population. This is the only place in the world where two national capital cities developed on opposite banks of a river, within sight of each other.

In March 2018, the "Brazzaville Declaration" was signed to promote better management and conservation of the Cuvette Centrale, a region in Congo Basin and primarily in DRC. It is the world's largest tropical peatland, made up of swamp forests. Conservation of this area is important for the survival of megafauna, and also critical to the world's climate. Burning the peat would release too much carbon and raise the Earth's temperature. The declaration to save peatlands as the world's largest terrestrial organic carbon stock was signed by Democratic Republic of the Congo, the Republic of the Congo, and Indonesia, which also has peatlands.

== History ==
In precolonial times, the location of the modern-day city of Brazzaville was inhabited by two trading centres, Mfwa and Mpila, which were part of the Tio Kingdom (the Eastern Teke).

Brazzaville was founded by the French colonial empire upon an existing indigenous Bateke settlement called Ncuna, during the Scramble for Africa when European nations established spheres of influence on the continent. The Italian-born explorer Pierre Savorgnan de Brazza, who was granted French citizenship in 1874, officially founded the settlement on 10 September 1880; it commemorates his name.

The Tio king, Iloo I, signed a treaty of protection with Brazza, which subjugated his lands to the French Empire. From October 1880 until May 1882, a small squad of troops led by Senegalese Sergeant Malamine Camara occupied the site, in order to prevent the land from falling into Belgian hands. Their forces were active on the south side of the river, where King Leopold II ruled the Belgian Congo for a period as a private holding. The first large-scale building work of the city began four years later, as the French competed with Léopoldville (now Kinshasa) which Belgian colonists were developing on the south side of the river.

The Berlin Conference of 1884 placed French control over this area on an official footing. The city became the capital of the French Congo in 1904. It continued as capital when French Equatorial Africa was founded in 1910, as a federation of French colonial states: it included Gabon, the Central African Republic, and Chad until 1960. From 1910 to 1915 the major municipal buildings were constructed, including a courthouse and headquarters for the Banque de l'AEF and Institut Pasteur.

In 1934, the Congo–Ocean Railway opened, linking Brazzaville with the Atlantic port of Pointe-Noire and bypassing the rapids on the Congo River. Construction of the railway resulted in the deaths of more than 17,000 Africans, and the people revolted against the French in 1928.

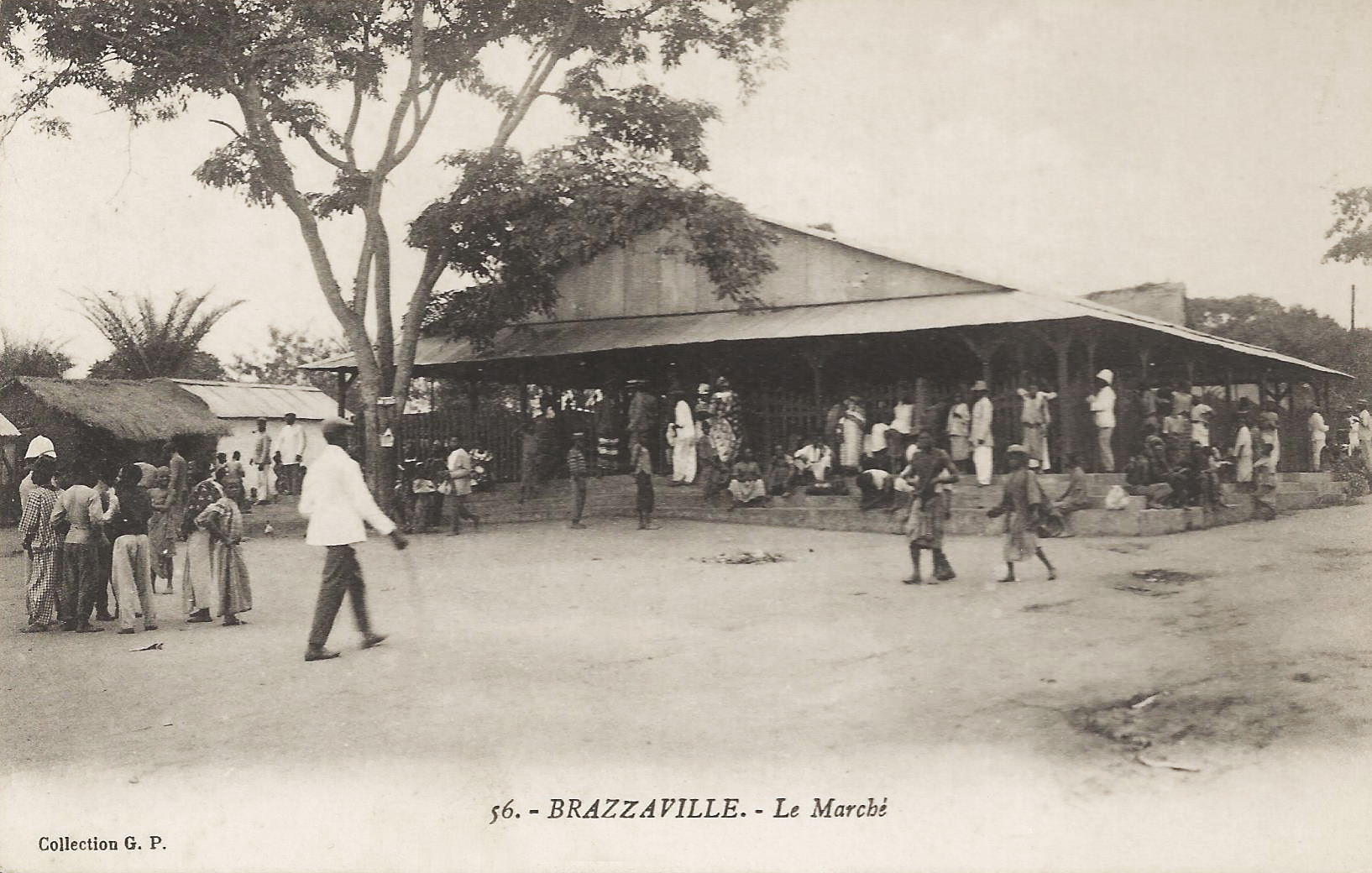
Brazzaville Market in 1905

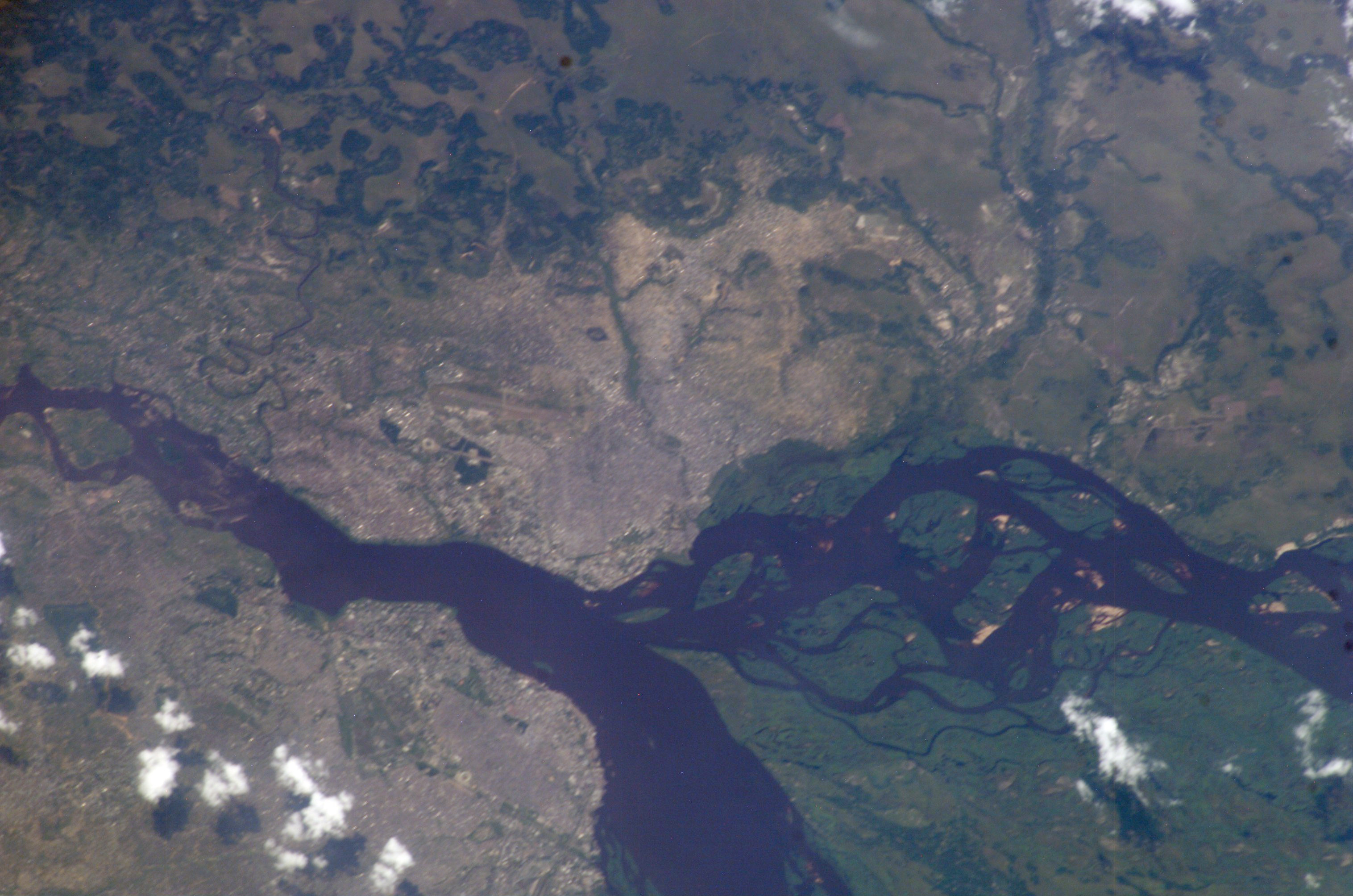
View of Brazzaville from space

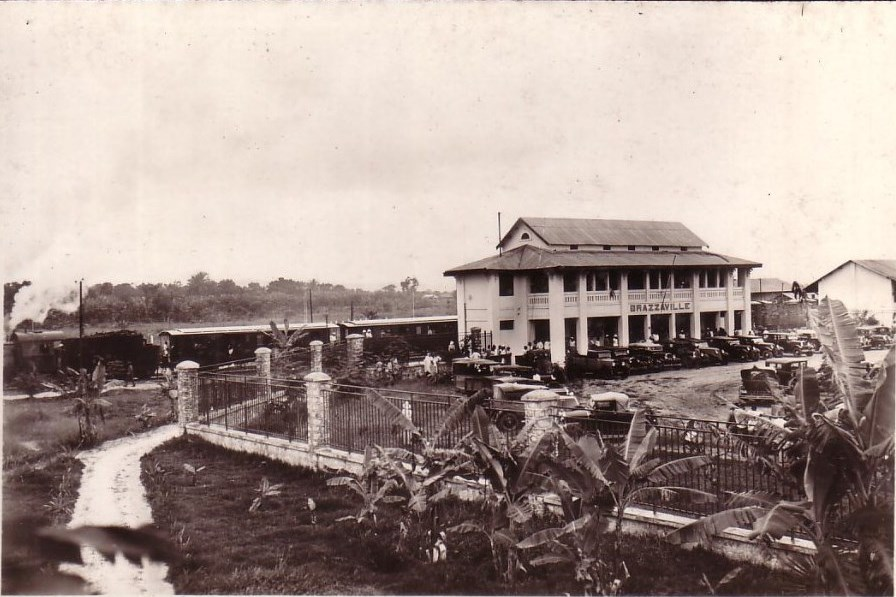
Brazzaville railway station in 1941

During World War II, Brazzaville and the rest of French Equatorial Africa remained beyond the control of Vichy France, which served the Nazi occupation. The city served as the capital of Free France from 1940 to 1943. In 1944, Brazzaville hosted a meeting of the French resistance forces and representatives of France's African colonies. The resulting Brazzaville Declaration represented an attempt to redefine the relationship between France and its African colonies.

Until the 1960s, the city was divided into European (the centre of the city) and African sections (Poto-Poto, Bacongo, and Makélékélé). In 1980, it became a "commune" separated from the surrounding Pool Department and divided into nine "arrondissements" along the French model of administration.

Since the late 20th century, the city has frequently been a staging ground for wars, including internal conflicts between rebel and government forces. It has been a base of conflicts between forces of the Republic of the Congo, the Democratic Republic of the Congo (DRC), and Angola. During the 1990s, civil wars resulted in thousands of civilian deaths here and forced hundreds of thousands of refugees to flee the city.

More recently thousands of people leaving the DRC have made their way to Brazzaville; the local United Nations force and the DRC government have accused the city of deporting thousands of these refugees.

In April 2016 fighting occurred between police and local militia units, with at least 18 people killed.

== Demographics ==
Historical population
Year	Pop.	±%
1984	585,812	—
1996	856,410	+46.2%
2007	1,373,382	+60.4%
2023	2,145,783	+56.2%

As of the 2023 census, the city had a population of 2.15 million.

The National Institute of Statistics for 2014 is 1.73 million. Kinshasa, DRC, had more than 10 million inhabitants in 2014.

Together with Kinshasa, the combined conurbation of Kinshasa-Brazzaville has about 12 million inhabitants. Significant political and infrastructure challenges prevent the two cities from functioning with any meaningful connection.

Since the mid-19th century, the two cities have been rivals in trade, sports and power. There have been proposals to connect the two capitals by a Brazzaville–Kinshasa Bridge. In 2018, with relative peace re-established in the region, the African Development Bank and Africa50 signed a deal with both governments to develop the project.

== Government ==
Brazzaville Bridge at night

Brazzaville, like Pointe-Noire, is a commune (municipality) contained within a department of the same name. It is governed by a municipal council and a departmental council. The mayor is the president of the municipal council.

The commune of Brazzaville is divided into nine arrondissements (boroughs), each with an official number:

1. Makélékélé
2. Bacongo
3. Poto-Poto
4. Moungali
5. Ouenzé
6. Talangaï
7. Mfilou
8. Madibou
9. Djiri

The department of Brazzaville includes the area of the commune and, since 2011, the new district of Ile Mbamou. In October 2024, the department absorbed the commune of Kintélé, which was previously part of the department of Pool.

== Economy ==
Nabemba Tower

The location of Brazzaville near the pool of the Congo River enabled it to grow as an industrial, trading and port settlement. It was connected through trade by ships and boats traveling upriver to inland areas, which produced raw materials from the beginning of the colonial period. Construction of the railway connecting to Pointe-Noire increased the ability of city businessmen to get their products to the port for export. Industries present in Brazzaville include machine shops, textiles, tanning, and manufacturing. As a key port on the Congo River, Brazzaville still takes deliveries of raw materials, such as rubber, wood, and agricultural products. From here they are generally sent onward to Pointe-Noire for export.

Many companies, government organizations and NGOs have regional offices in the capital city, where they can work with government officials. The World Health Organization has its regional office for Africa located in Brazzaville. Companies headquartered in Brazzaville include the country's flag carrier Equatorial Congo Airlines and the mobile operator Warid Congo.

== Culture ==
Roger Erell, a highly regarded architect, designed a house in the city for Charles de Gaulle when he was the leader of Free France here. Other buildings include the Pierre Savorgnan de Brazza Mausoleum, the Nabemba Tower, and the Congressional Palace (Brazzaville).

The Marien Ngouabi Mausoleum, Brazzaville Zoo, and the Poto-Poto School of Painting are also destinations for visitors and city residents.

== Places of worship ==
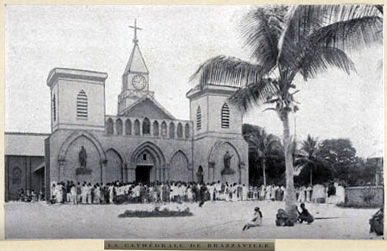
The Sacred Heart Cathedral in 1926

Many Congolese converted to Catholicism during the French colonial period. Christian churches are most prevalent in the city, where the Roman Catholic Church has an archdiocese. Since then, churches have been established by new immigrants and by local adoption of evangelical Protestantism. Examples include the Basilica of Sainte-Anne-du-Congo in Brazzaville, Greek Orthodox Archdiocese of Brazzaville and Gabon (Patriarchate of Alexandria and All Africa), Evangelical Church of Congo (World Communion of Reformed Churches), and Assemblies of God.

== Education ==
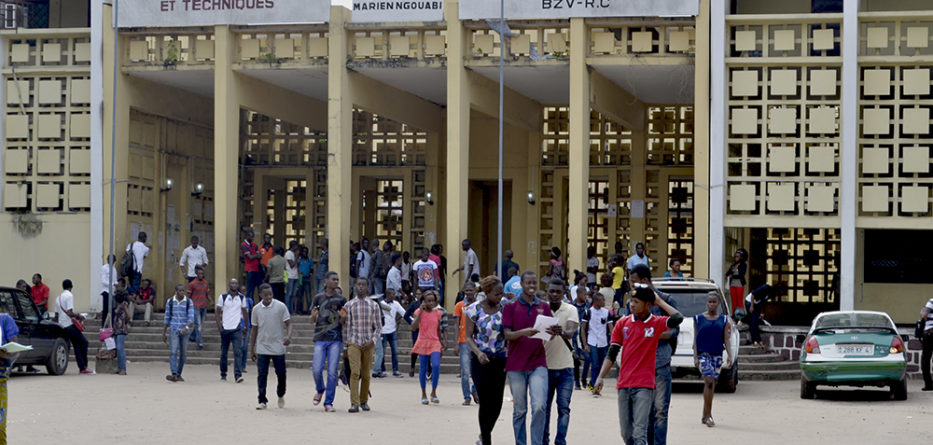
Marien Ngouabi University's Law School

The Marien Ngouabi University is a public university in Brazzaville, named after a former leader. The university was founded in December 1971 after independence. Today it has approximately 26,000 students.

International schools:

- Lycée Français Saint-Exupéry de Brazzaville (French)
- American International School of Brazzaville

== Climate ==
Brazzaville features a tropical wet and dry climate. Its wet season, which runs from October to May, is longer than its dry season, which covers the remaining months. Brazzaville's driest months, July and August, on average have no significant precipitation. Since Brazzaville is south of the equator, its dry season begins at around its "winter" solstice, which is the month of June. The city has relatively consistent temperatures throughout the course of the year.

Climate data for Brazzaville (1991-2020)
Month	Jan	Feb	Mar	Apr	May	Jun	Jul	Aug	Sep	Oct	Nov	Dec	Year
Record high °C (°F)	37.5 (99.5)	36.3 (97.3)	37.5 (99.5)	36.8 (98.2)	37.3 (99.1)	34.3 (93.7)	33.8 (92.8)	40.2 (104.4)	39.5 (103.1)	38.9 (102.0)	35.8 (96.4)	40.2 (104.4)	40.2 (104.4)
Mean daily maximum °C (°F)	30.9 (87.6)	31.7 (89.1)	32.5 (90.5)	32.6 (90.7)	31.4 (88.5)	28.9 (84.0)	28.1 (82.6)	29.1 (84.4)	30.9 (87.6)	31.2 (88.2)	31.2 (88.2)	30.8 (87.4)	30.8 (87.4)
Daily mean °C (°F)	26.1 (79.0)	26.6 (79.9)	26.8 (80.2)	26.7 (80.1)	26.3 (79.3)	24.1 (75.4)	23.4 (74.1)	24.1 (75.4)	25.9 (78.6)	26.2 (79.2)	25.7 (78.3)	25.9 (78.6)	25.6 (78.1)
Mean daily minimum °C (°F)	22.6 (72.7)	22.3 (72.1)	22.9 (73.2)	22.9 (73.2)	22.6 (72.7)	20.6 (69.1)	19.5 (67.1)	20.5 (68.9)	21.7 (71.1)	22.3 (72.1)	22.3 (72.1)	22.4 (72.3)	21.9 (71.4)
Record low °C (°F)	17.0 (62.6)	14.5 (58.1)	17.7 (63.9)	18.6 (65.5)	17.0 (62.6)	12.7 (54.9)	10.5 (50.9)	10.3 (50.5)	15.2 (59.4)	13.7 (56.7)	18.2 (64.8)	17.7 (63.9)	10.3 (50.5)
Average precipitation mm (inches)	159.5 (6.28)	136.6 (5.38)	188.7 (7.43)	168.8 (6.65)	132.0 (5.20)	9.4 (0.37)	3.0 (0.12)	10.8 (0.43)	42.6 (1.68)	163.5 (6.44)	263.6 (10.38)	216.4 (8.52)	1,494.9 (58.85)
Average precipitation days (≥ 1.0 mm)	10	8	11	12	8	1	0	0	4	9	14	12	89
Average relative humidity (%)	81	80	79	81	81	79	77	73	71	76	81	82	78
Mean monthly sunshine hours	171	167	192	181	177	141	127	133	145	152	157	154	1,897
Source: NOAA

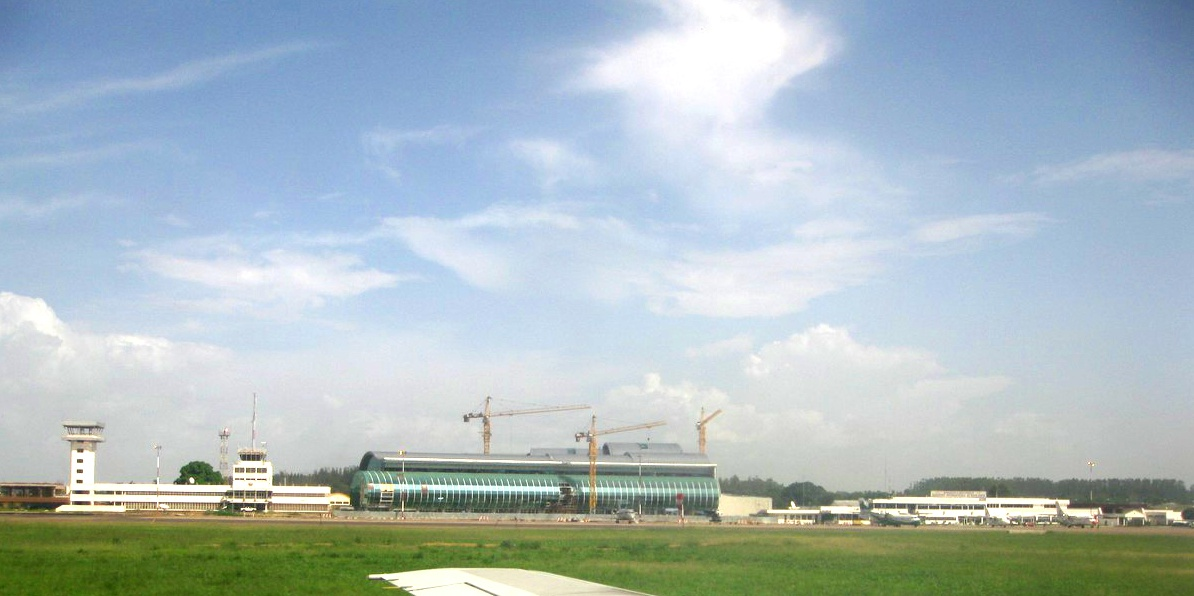
Maya-Maya Airport

== Transport ==
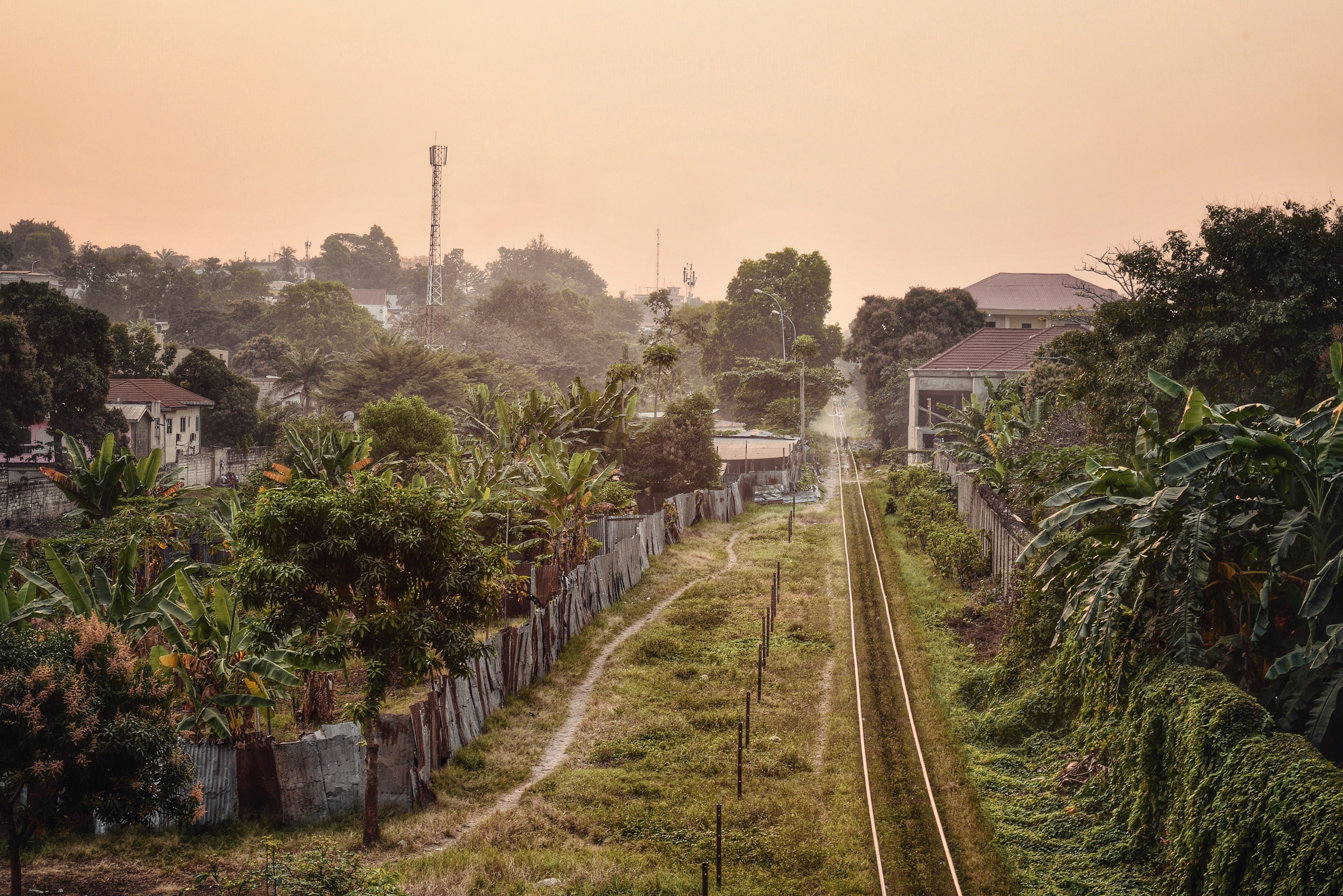
A railroad in Brazzaville

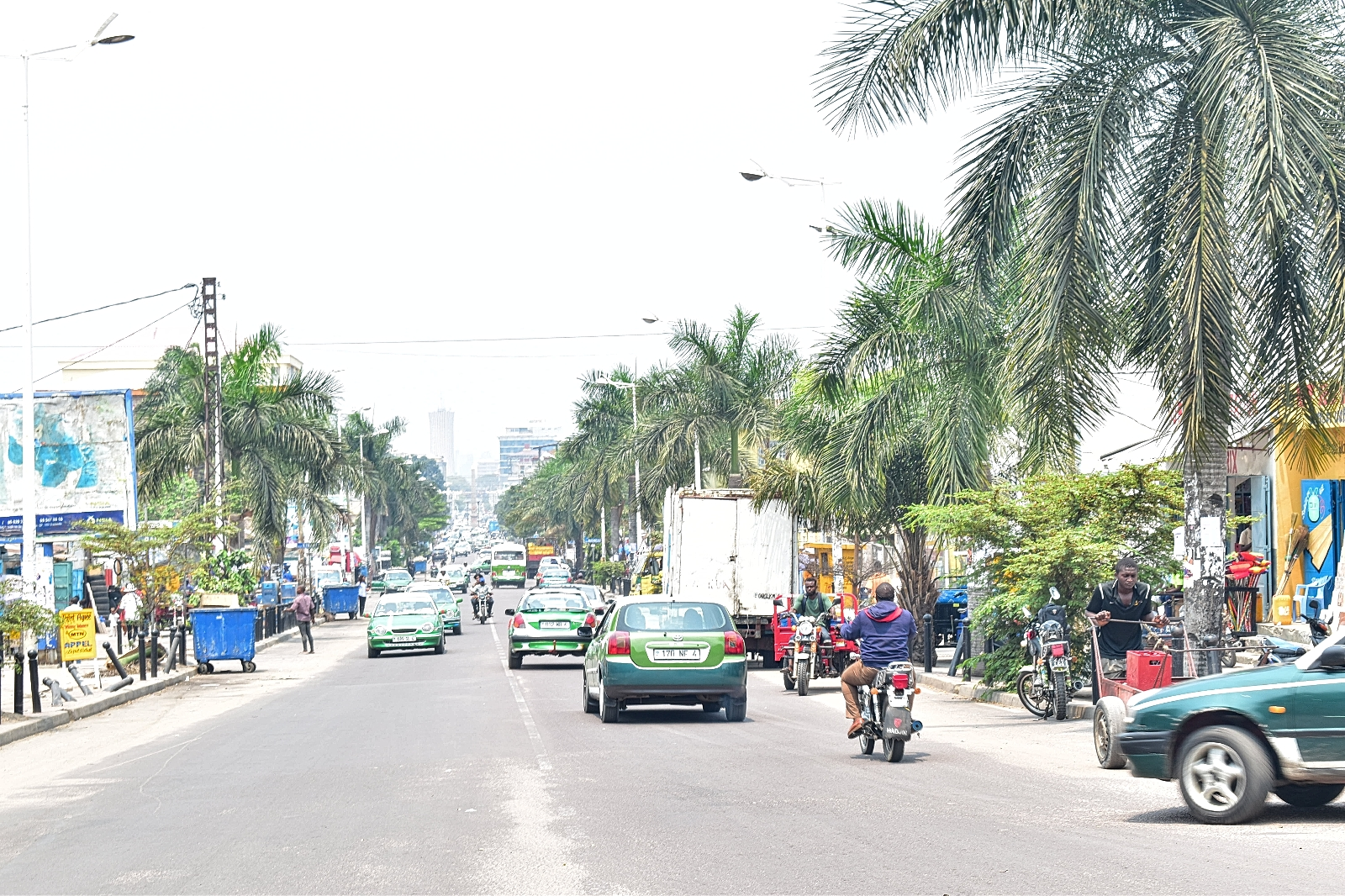
Road transport in Brazzaville

The city is home to Maya-Maya Airport, which lies in the centre of the city and which has regular flights to Pointe-Noire as well as international destinations in Africa, Europe and the Middle East. A flight operates twice weekly between Brazzaville and Kinshasa, but the flight time is only five minutes.

The Congo-Ocean Railway has a station in the city and in 2014 was operating the La Gazelle train service every other day to Pointe-Noire and intermediate destinations.

The city is an important river port, with ferries sailing to Kinshasa and to Bangui via Impfondo. Ferries and fast private boats serve as the primary means of connection between Kinshasa and Brazzaville. The Livingstone Falls lie on the outskirts of the city, where the Djoué River meets the Congo, rendering river transport to the coast impossible, qualifying the railway as a portage railway.

Although there is no organised public transport system, privately owned buses are available in the capital.

Taxis are available on every street and are easily recognized, being painted with a green body and white top, and the fare for a short trip is CF700. About twenty percent of the vehicles in Brazzaville are taxis. There are also collective taxis that drive certain routes and charge CF150.

A road-rail bridge is proposed to connect Brazzaville with Kinshasa. The rail gauge on both sides is the same at 1067mm.

== Notable people ==
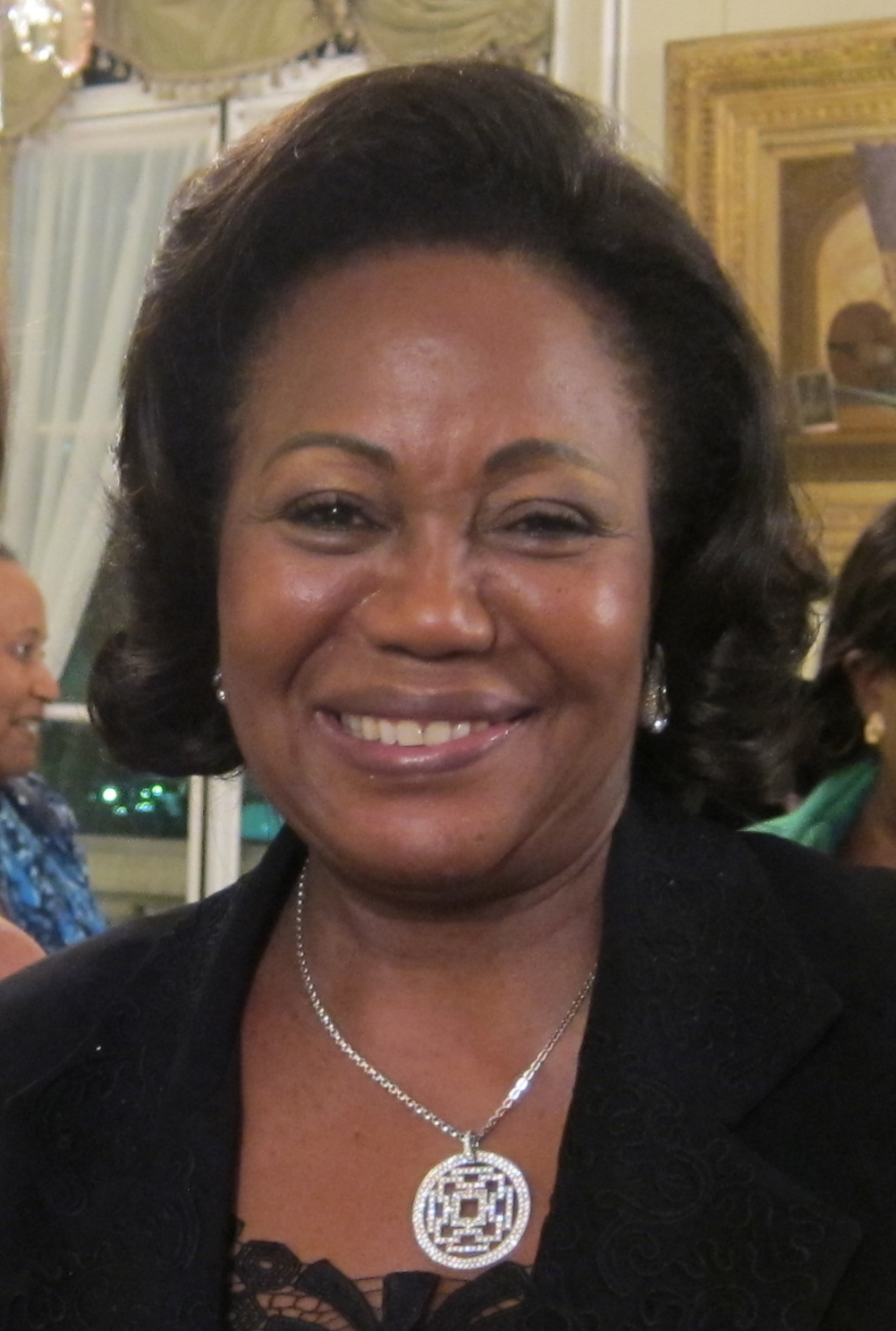
Antoinette Sassou Nguesso, 2011

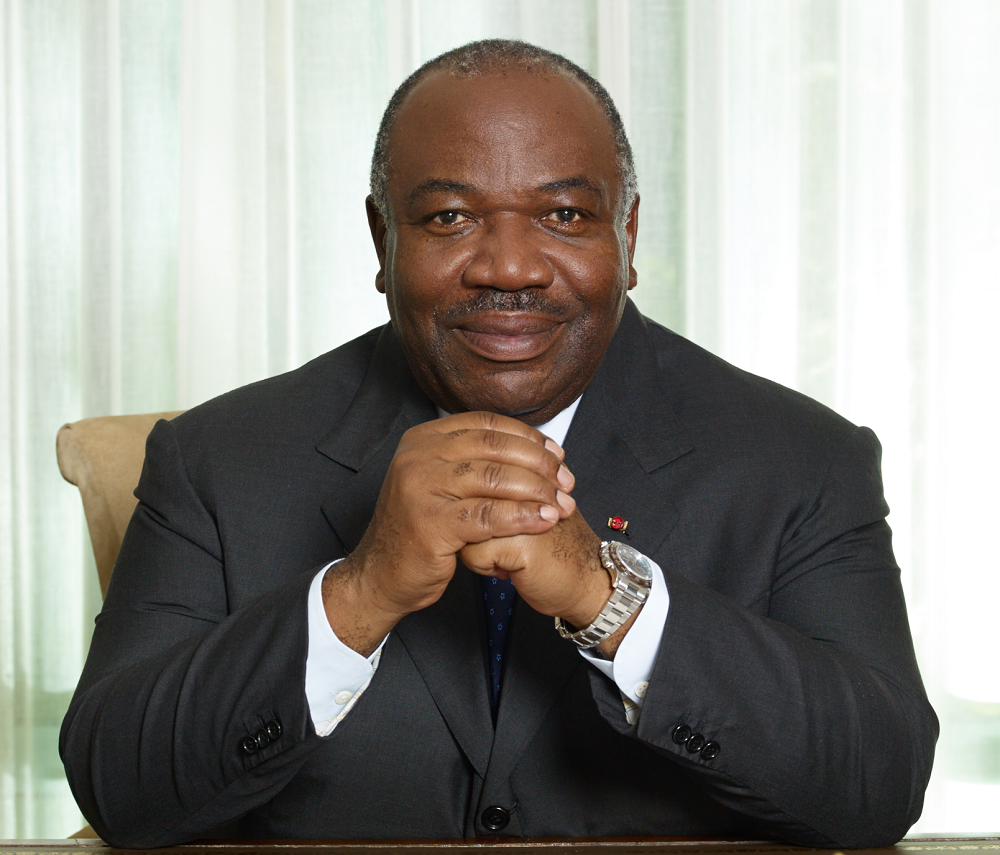
Ali Bongo Ondimba, 2016

See Category:People from Brazzaville

=== Politics and religion ===
- Pierre Savorgnan de Brazza (1852–1905), eponymous founder
- Prosper Philippe Augouard (1852–1921), French Catholic priest, missionary and explorer, settled Brazzaville in 1887
- Ambroise Noumazalaye (1933–2007), Prime Minister of Congo-Brazzaville, 1966 to 1968
- Antoinette Sassou Nguesso (born 1945), First Lady of the Republic of the Congo since 1997
- Charles Richard Mondjo (born 1954), Chief of Staff of the Congo Armed Forces, 2002 to 2012
- Dominique Ntsiété (1940-2012), senator
- Ali Bongo Ondimba (born 1959), Gabonese politician, 3rd President of Gabon since 2009
- Alain Akouala Atipault (born 1959), politician and government Minister
- Frédéric Bintsamou (born 1964), also known as Pasteur Ntumi, a Protestant clergyman and leader of the "semi-religious" rebel group The Ninjas
- Alice Badiangana (born 1939), trade unionist and politician

=== Art ===
- Aurlus Mabélé (1953–2020) a Congolese singer and composer.
- Bill Kouélany (born 1965) a Congolese artist, writer and set designer.
- Sardoine Mia (born 1998), artist
- Jean Serge Essous (1935-2009) a Congolese saxophonist & clarinetist
- Patience Dabany (born 1941) singer, musician and First Lady of Gabon, 1967 to 1987
- Gaitana (born 1979), Ukrainian singer who lived in Brazzaville for five years
- Cyril Kongo (born 1969), a French painter and graffiti artist, lived in Brazzaville in the 80s
- Franklin Boukaka (1940–1972), a Congolese baritone singer, guitarist, and songwriter who is recognized as a pioneer of Congolese popular music

=== Media and science ===
- Emmanuel Dongala (born 1941) a Congolese chemist and novelist
- Alain Mabanckou (born 1966) novelist, journalist, poet and academic
- Dominique Tchimbakala (born 1977) journalist and TV presenter, news anchor for TV5Monde
- Scholastique Dianzinga, professor and specialist in women's history
- Didier Roustan (born 1957), French sports journalist

=== Sport ===
- André Merlin (1911–1960) a French tennis player.
- François M'Pelé (born 1947) a former footballer with 521 club caps and 9 for Congo
- Rolf-Christel Guié-Mien (born 1977) former footballer with 338 club caps and 26 for Congo
- Oscar Ewolo (born 1978) former footballer with 374 club caps and 38 for Congo, evangelical pastor
- Lorène Bazolo (born 1983) track and field athlete, Congolese flag bearer at the 2012 Summer Olympics
- Ladislas Douniama (born 1986) former footballer with over 250 club caps and 28 for Congo
- Pamela Mouele-Mboussi (born 1988) long and triple jumper, national flag carrier at the 2008 Summer Olympics
- Serge Ibaka (born 1989), professional basketball player
- Férébory Doré (born 1989) footballer with over 200 club caps and 37 for Congo
- Brice Samba (born in 1971), Congolese international soccer player
- Darcel Yandzi (born 1973), French international judoka
- Guy Mbenza (born 2000), professional footballer for Liaoning Tieren

== Twin towns and sister cities ==
- Dresden, Germany
- Weihai, China
- Kinshasa, Democratic Republic of the Congo

== See also ==
- List of cities in the Republic of the Congo
- Brazzaville Conference

== Bibliography ==
- Ziavoula, Robert Edmond, ed. (2006). Brazzaville, une ville à reconstruire. Paris: Karthala. ISBN 2-84586-825-1.

== Notes ==
- Chavannes, Charles de. (1929) "Le Sergent Sénégalais Malamine." Annales de l'Académie des Sciences Coloniales, vol. 3:159–187.
- Petringa, Maria. (2006) Brazza, A Life for Africa (2006) ISBN 978-1-4259-1198-0
- Tiepolo, M. (1996) "City Profile: Brazzaville" in Cities v. 13, pp. 117–124
- Brisset-Guibert, Hervé (2007) Brazzaville petit guide historique, in the site www.presidence.cg ("palais presidentiel")
- Cultural reference: In the final scene of the 1942 film, Casablanca, it is to Brazzaville that Captain Renault (Claude Rains) suggests he and Rick (Humphrey Bogart) might escape to together for "vacation" and, as Rick counters, "the beginning of a beautiful friendship."
- Whitehouse, Bruce (2012). Migrants and Strangers in an African City: Exile, Dignity, Belonging. Bloomington: Indiana University Press. ISBN 9780253000811.
