= List of wars involving the Republic of the Congo =

This is a list of wars involving the Republic of the Congo.

Conflict	Combatant 1	Combatant 2	Result
1968 Republic of the Congo coup d'état (1968)	Republic of the Congo	Army Faction	Coup succeeds
1972 Republic of the Congo coup d'état attempt (1972)	People's Republic of the Congo	Pro-Ange Diawara Faction	Coup fails
First Republic of the Congo Civil War (1993–1994)	Republic of the Congo; Cocoye Militia; Ninja Militia; Gabon; France	(Republic of the Congo) Congolese Party of Labour; Cobra Militia	Government victory
Second Republic of the Congo Civil War (1997–1999)	Armed Forces of the Republic of the Congo (to October 1997); Cocoye Militia; Ninja Militia; Nsiloulou; Democratic Republic of the Congo	Armed Forces of the Republic of the Congo (from October 1997); Cobra Militia (Rwanda) Rwandan Hutu Militia; Angola; Chad	Nguesso loyalist victory
Central African Republic Civil War (2013–present)	Central African Republic; South Africa; France; Democratic Republic of the Congo; Angola; Cameroon; Chad; Republic of the Congo; Gabon	(Central African Republic) Séléka (Central African Republic) Anti-balaka	Ongoing: President Michel Djotodia resigns and is replaced by Catherine Samba-Panza
2002–2003 conflict in the Pool Department (2002–2003)	Republic of the Congo	Ninja Militia	Ceasefire
Pool War (2016–2017)	Republic of the Congo	Ninja Militia	Ceasefire
