= Willy Matsanga =

Congolese politician

Anicet Wilfrid Pandou, commonly known as Willy Matsanga (c. 1969 – 9 October 2014), was a Congolese politician. He was a militia leader during the tumultuous events of the 1990s and later served as a Deputy in the National Assembly of Congo-Brazzaville from 2007 to 2014.

== Militia leader ==
Matsanga was one of the leaders of the Ninja militia loyal to opposition leader Bernard Kolélas during the political violence of 1993–1994, in which rival militias battled in Brazzaville. At the beginning of the June–October 1997 civil war, he defected to the side of Denis Sassou Nguesso and the rebel Cobra militia.

The civil war ended in victory for the Cobras on 15 October 1997; President Pascal Lissouba was ousted and Sassou Nguesso regained control of the country. Some believed that Matsanga's defection was a decisive factor in enabling Sassou Nguesso's victory. In the days that followed Lissouba's ouster, as the Cobras worked to consolidate control of the country, Matsanga led some Cobra fighters to attack Lissouba loyalists at Matoumbou on 18 October 1997. According to Matsanga, his fighters killed 30 of the Lissouba loyalists there and dispersed the other 70, while losing three of their own men.

Matsanga was appointed as Security Adviser to the Minister of the Interior after the 1997 civil war, but he proved difficult to control despite his official post. He and the security forces fell into a dispute over airport access, and in the course of that dispute one person was accidentally killed by gunfire in the Kinsoundi section of Brazzaville in September 2000.

At the time of the March 2002 presidential election, Matsanga backed André Milongo, the main opposition candidate, and joined Milongo's campaign. Matsanga reportedly agreed to Milongo's request that he not bring along weapons during the campaign. Although some initially viewed Matsanga's surprising decision to back Milongo as political maneuvering on the part of Sassou Nguesso, Matsanga's rhetoric suggested violent opposition to the government. Milongo ultimately decided to boycott the election. Matsanga then joined the Ninja rebels who remained active in the Pool Region under the leadership of Pasteur Ntoumi.

In early April 2002, serious fighting broke out between the army and Ninja rebels loyal to Ntoumi. As the army battled Ntoumi's rebels, Matsanga signed an agreement with Michel Ngakala, the High Commissioner for the Reintegration of Former Combatants, and the army began an operation to disarm the Ninjas loyal to Matsanga in southern Brazzaville on 9 April 2002. The operation was disrupted when the Ninjas fired their weapons and frightened the local population. As a result, thousands of inhabitants of southern Brazzaville fled to other parts of the city.

Matsanga, who had acquired a fearsome reputation due to his militia activities over the years, was rumored to have died in Congo-Kinshasa after the 2002 events. However, he received some attention in July 2005 by intervening in a parking dispute in Brazzaville's Bacongo district and helping to escort one of the individuals to a police station. It was observed that the police treated Matsanga with deference.

== Politician ==
In the June 2007 parliamentary election, Matsanga stood as an independent candidate for the fourth constituency of Makélékélé, a district of Brazzaville. In the first round, he placed first with 30.65% of the vote; Hellot Matson Mampouya, the candidate of the Congolese Movement for Democracy and Integral Development (MCDDI), was close behind with 29.79%. Because no candidate won a majority in the first round, Matsanga faced Mampouya in a second round, held in August 2007. The ruling Congolese Labour Party (PCT), which had signed an electoral alliance with the MCDDI, supported Mampouya. Nevertheless, Matsanga defeated Mampouya in the second round, receiving 56.74% of the vote.

Matsanga contested the June 2008 local elections as an independent candidate in Makélékélé, and he succeeded in winning a seat on the 15-member Makélékélé Municipal Council.

In a 2011 interview, Matsanga expressed disillusionment with politics and said that he did not intend to run for re-election to the National Assembly in the 2012 parliamentary election. However, he insisted that he would win another term if he chose to stand. He affirmed that he supported President Sassou Nguesso but expressed disgust with the political class.

In the July–August 2012 parliamentary election, Matsanga nevertheless chose to stand for re-election as an independent candidate in the fourth constituency of Makélékélé. No candidate received a majority in the first round, leading Matsanga to again face Hellot Matson Mampouya, who was at that point a government minister, in a second round. However, Mampouya withdrew from the race a few days before the second round was held, reportedly due to concerns that there could be disorder in the constituency. With no opponent, Matsanga won the second round with 100% of the vote. Speaking on 17 August 2012, he said that he would take actions to help the vulnerable and work towards the alleviation of youth unemployment.

After being hospitalized in France, Matsanga died at Orléans on 9 October 2014.
