= Congolese Civil War =

Congolese Civil War or Congo War may refer to any of a number of armed internal conflicts in the present-day countries of the Democratic Republic of the Congo and the Republic of the Congo in Central Africa.

== Pre-colonial Congo ==
- Kongo Civil War (1665–1709), in the historic Kingdom of Kongo

== Democratic Republic of the Congo ==
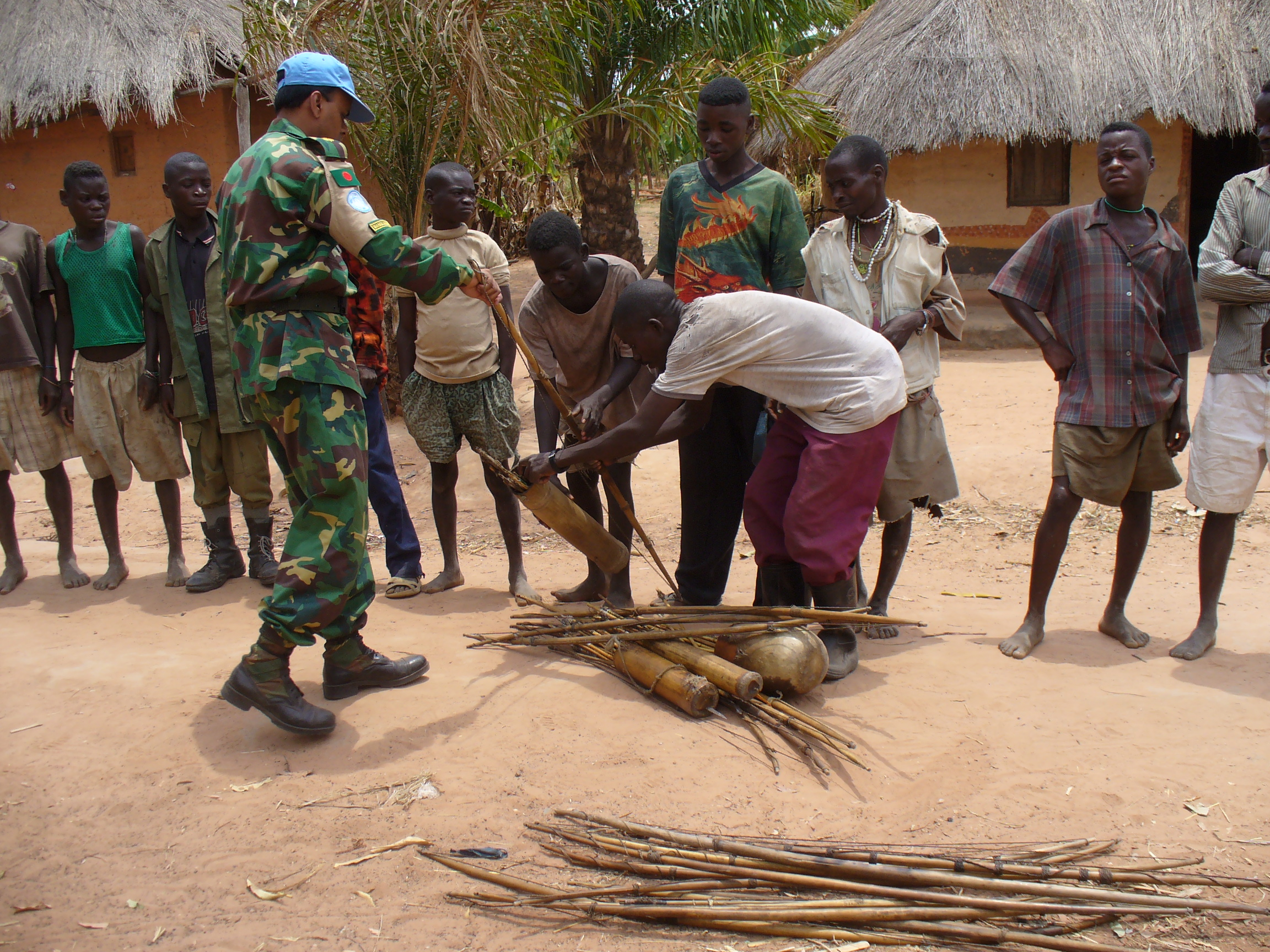
Mai-Mai Kata Katanga militants surrendering in northern Katanga.

Civil wars in the Democratic Republic of the Congo (also known as Congo-Kinshasa and DR Congo, formerly known as Congo-Léopoldville and Zaire):

- Congo Crisis (1960–1965), dating from the country's independence from Belgium to the rise of dictator Mobutu Sese Seko
  - Kwilu rebellion (1963–1965)
  - Kanyarwanda War (1963–1966)
  - Simba rebellion (1964)
- Katanga insurgency (1963–present), sub-conflict of Congo Crisis that continued as ongoing insurgency
  - Batwa–Luba clashes (2013–2018)
- Shaba invasions (Shaba I 1977, Shaba II 1978)
- Lord's Resistance Army insurgency (1987–present)
- Allied Democratic Forces insurgency (1996–present)
- First Congo War (1996–1997), which led to the overthrow of Mobutu by Laurent-Désiré Kabila and his rebels
- Second Congo War (1998–2003), involved nine nations and led to ongoing low-level warfare, despite an official peace treaty and the first democratic elections in 2006
- Ituri conflict (1999–present) and Kivu conflict (2004–present), sub-conflicts of the Second Congo War that continued as ongoing insurgencies
  - M23 rebellion (2012–2013)
  - M23 campaign (2022–present)
- Dongo conflict (2009)
- Kamwina Nsapu rebellion (2016–2019)
- Western DR Congo clashes (2022–present)

== Republic of the Congo ==
Civil wars in the Republic of the Congo (also known as Congo-Brazzaville and the Congo Republic):

- Republic of the Congo Civil War (1993–1994)
- Republic of the Congo Civil War (1997–1999)
- 2002–2003 conflict in the Pool Department
- Pool War (2016–2017)

== See also ==
- Congolese (disambiguation)
