= Michel Ngakala =

Congolese military officer and politician

Michel Ngakala is a Congolese military officer and politician who is a leading member of the Congolese Labour Party (PCT), the ruling party in the Republic of the Congo, serving as its Permanent Secretary for Organization. He was Commander of the Congolese People's Militia during the 1980s, and he was the High Commissioner for the Reintegration of Former Combatants, a role that involved the implementation of peace agreements with rebels, from 2001 to 2012.

== Military and political career under single-party rule ==
Ngakala was promoted to the rank of master corporal in 1968. Said to be a cousin of President Denis Sassou Nguesso, Ngakala was elected to the PCT Central Committee at an extraordinary party congress held on 26–31 March 1979. He was also appointed as Commander of the Congolese People's Militia.

Ngakala was considered part of the "Oyo clan", a group of political and military figures who were natives of Sassou Nguesso's home village, Oyo. Sassou Nguesso placed particular trust in members of the "Oyo clan", and they were given important positions in his regime. At the PCT's Third Ordinary Congress, held on 27–31 July 1984, Ngakala was re-elected to the 75-member PCT Central Committee. Together with Sassou Nguesso, he visited East Germany in May 1985. East Germany, as an ally of Congo-Brazzaville, provided the Congolese People's Militia with training and equipment.

Ngakala was also First Secretary of the Union of Congolese Socialist Youth (UJSC), the PCT's youth organization, for a time. In 1990, he was promoted to the rank of colonel.

== Events of the 1990s ==
After Sassou Nguesso was defeated in the August 1992 presidential election, he and the PCT went into opposition. The controversial May–June 1993 parliamentary election was followed by an extended round of serious political violence between the government and opposition, and in that environment the various sides formed ethnically based militias to fight in Brazzaville. Ngakala and General Pierre Oba created the Cobra militia, which was loyal to Sassou Nguesso. The Cobras were concentrated in the Mpila, Ouenzé, and Talangaï districts of Brazzaville, and they were allied with the Ninja militia loyal to another opposition leader, Bernard Kolélas, which was concentrated in the Bacongo district. The army and the Zoulou militia loyal to President Pascal Lissouba attacked their opponents on 3 November 1993, but were unsuccessful; the competing militias continued to violently dominate the city. An agreement in January 1994 facilitated a gradual return to peace.

On 5 June 1997, a civil war broke out between the government of President Lissouba and Sassou Nguesso's Cobra militia. After months of fighting, the Cobras, assisted by Angolan troops, captured Brazzaville and Pointe-Noire on 14–15 October 1997, thereby ousting Lissouba and returning Sassou Nguesso to power.

== High Commissioner for Reintegration ==
After a 2001 national peace convention, the office of High Commissioner for the Reintegration of Former Combatants was established through a presidential decree on 10 August 2001, and Ngakala was appointed to the post. His task was to oversee the process of disarming rebels and reintegrating them into civilian life. As High Commissioner for the Reintegration of Former Combatants, Ngakala continued to be closely associated with Pierre Oba, who served in the government as Minister of the Interior. Ngakala's work was focused on the reintegration of rebel fighters from the Pool-based Ninja militia of Pasteur Ntoumi. He met with Ntoumi in the Vinza district on 16 October 2001, and both sides spoke warmly about peace and cooperation.

On 25 February 2002, Ngakala said that the disarmament and reintegration program was nearly ready to begin and that five regional offices across the country would be opened to facilitate its work. He also observed that the program had received about 3.4 billion CFA francs in funding from the International Development Association and that the International Organization for Migration (IOM) had already managed to collect about 1,200 weapons. However, the number of weapons collected by the IOM constituted only a small fraction of the total number of illegal weapons.

The process proved to be difficult and spotty. Frustrated by the lack of progress, Ngakala sharply criticized Ntoumi on 21 March 2002, accusing him of failing to follow through on his commitments and thereby obstructing the peace process. He stressed that Ntoumi could not be allowed to continue controlling the Vinza district indefinitely, as the area was entitled to its parliamentary representation and local government, and he said that Ntoumi should not interpret the government's attempts at peaceful resolution as a sign of weakness. Ngakala's "inflammatory" remarks were followed by a round of renewed fighting between the army and the Ninjas. Shooting subsequently broke out at an April 2002 meeting between Ngakala and about 700 Ninjas in Brazzaville, causing around 80,000 people to flee.

Ngakala retired from the military in 2002. The pace of disarmament and reintegration remained slow in subsequent years. Speaking on 4 June 2004, Ngakala again blamed Ntoumi for delaying the process through his failure to follow through on his commitments.

On 18 December 2004, Ngakala announced that he had rejoined the PCT. In the wake of disappointing results and international disapproval for the reintegration program, Ngalaka presented a revamped program on 9 February 2005. The new program was broader in scope and placed a higher priority on disarmament, which was to be funded by the European Union.

Ngakala was included on the Directory of the Preparatory Committee for the PCT's Fifth Extraordinary Congress; although not a member of the PCT Political Bureau, he was specially added to the Directory on 31 October 2006, along with a number of others. The congress was held on 22–29 December 2006.

On 17–18 January 2007, Ngakala—acting as the representative of the PCT—met with François Ibovi, the Minister of Territorial Administration, to discuss preparations for the 2007 parliamentary election, along with representatives from various other parties. Ngakala played an important role in the PCT's activities during the election period due to his role as the PCT's Permanent Secretary in charge of Organization and Party Life.

The results of the first round of the parliamentary election, held in June 2007, showed the PCT winning half of the seats that were decided in the first round, while PCT allies won many of the other seats. Regarding electoral strategy for the second round, Ngakala said on 4 July 2007 that the PCT was focused on "consultation and consensus" with its allies. While acknowledging that disagreement within the PCT and between the PCT and its allies was common, he said that the party "did not want to stifle enthusiasm". He also said that the election was a stepping stone towards improving the majority's ability to implement Sassou Nguesso's policies.

Following the second round, Ngakala said on 11 August 2007 that the results were good because they gave Sassou Nguesso "a comfortable majority in the National Assembly". He also looked ahead to the 2009 presidential election, saying that a reorganization of the Presidential Majority was necessary to improve its position for that election. Some PCT candidates argued that they failed to win seats due to their opposition to the "refoundation" of the PCT (a project that was favored by the PCT's top leadership), but Ngakala retorted that no action had been taken to eliminate their candidacies and that they had only lost because they failed to win enough votes. He noted that some opponents of the "refoundation" project had succeeded in winning seats.

At a press conference on 20 September 2007, Ngakala said that Congo-Brazzaville was an example to the world because it had, in spite of the ruinous effects of the civil war, restored peace without international intervention. He also argued that the PCT was firmly committed to dialogue and pluralism and that it had completely broken with the monolithic thinking that characterized single-party rule. According to Ngakala, the PCT's cooperative and pluralistic spirit was reflected in the party's willingness to accept a high level of internal debate as well as its openness to the opposition. He noted that a deputy from the opposition had been allowed to head one of the National Assembly's commissions.

Ngakala was present for a World Bank meeting on the Multi-Country Demobilization and Reintegration Program that was held in Paris on 11–13 December 2007. On that occasion, he described Congo-Brazzaville's peace process as a unique achievement. According to Ngalaka, Congo-Brazzaville laid the foundations for peace through a national dialogue and the participation of exiled opposition leaders. He also said that Congo-Brazzaville was alone in managing its own disarmament and reintegration program, and he said that his country was willing to share its experience with other countries in the sub-region.

Ngakala continued to stress the importance of reorganizing the presidential majority and improving its cohesion in the wake of the 2007 parliamentary election. He said in December 2007 that the presidential majority would present joint lists for the 2008 local elections. Some parties in the presidential majority opposed this move, and Ngakala said that they were free to contest the elections on their own if they wished.

The Rally of the Presidential Majority (RMP), a large coalition of parties supporting Sassou Nguesso, was created on 20 December 2007. Ngakala, who was credited with playing a key role in the establishment of the RMP, was designated as the First Vice-President of the RMP's National Coordination.

After the opposition Rally for Democracy and Development (RDD) extended an offer of dialogue to the PCT on 21 December 2008, Ngakala welcomed the move at a press conference on 9 January 2009. He spoke of the "ideological affinities" between the two parties, saying that "only ideas matter and enable men to transcend their egos". He also took the opportunity to criticize the proliferation of political parties, most of which were ethnically or tribally based, and said that Congolese politics would be more productive if there were only three large parties with specific programs.

Ngakala headed a PCT delegation that met with a delegation from the Chinese Communist Party (CCP) on 11 June 2010 in Brazzaville. The meeting was intended to strengthen the already warm relationship between the two parties and their respective countries.

At the PCT's Sixth Extraordinary Congress, held in July 2011, Ngakala was elected to the party's 51-member Political Bureau. He was also re-elected to his post as Secretary for Organization, in charge of Party Life. The party leadership was substantially altered at the July 2011 congress; only two previous members of the Permanent Secretariat, including Ngakala, were retained amongst the 12 members of the Secretariat elected at the Sixth Extraordinary Congress.

After 11 years as High Commissioner for the Reintegration of Former Combatants, Ngakala was succeeded by Norbert Dabira at a ceremony on 14 November 2012. Ngakala explained on the occasion that at the PCT's 2011 congress it had been decided that state positions were incompatible with positions on the PCT Secretariat and therefore he must devote himself exclusively to his party work.

During the campaign for the September 2014 local elections, Ngakala was dispatched to Pointe-Noire to campaign for the PCT's candidates there. He led a 31-member PCT delegation to China in November 2015 and afterwards spoke about learning from the experience of the CCP.
