= Hellot Matson Mampouya =

Congolese politician

Hellot Matson Mampouya (born 7 February 1964) is a Congolese politician who served in the government of Congo-Brazzaville as Minister of Scientific Research from 2007 to 2009, as Minister of Fishing from 2009 to 2012, as Minister of Primary and Secondary Education from 2012 to 2015, as Minister of Posts and Telecommunications from 2015 to 2016, and again as Minister of Scientific Research from 2016 to 2017. For years he was a leading member of the Congolese Movement for Democracy and Integral Development (MCDDI), but in 2013 he formed his own party, the Dynamic for the Republic and Recovery (DRD).

== Early life and education ==
Mampouya was born across the Congo River in Kinshasa in February 1964. He and other nationals of Congo-Brazzaville were expelled from Congo-Kinshasa by its Prime Minister, Moise Tshombé, in July 1964. Thus he grew up in Congo-Brazzaville and attended the Marien Ngouabi University, receiving a law degree in 1992.

== Political career ==
An early member of the MCDDI, Mampouya co-founded the MCDDI Youth in 1991, acting as its Secretary for Foreign Relations. Together with six other parties, the MCDDI formed the Union for Democratic Renewal (URD), an opposition coalition, on 27 August 1992; the MCDDI was the leading participant in the coalition, and Mampouya was designated as Spokesman of the URD Youth.

In October 1995, Mampouya was included in the MCDDI's National Executive Bureau. He was also designated as Spokesman of the MCDDI and was placed in charge of the party's communications department, with responsibility for mobilization. During the same period, MCDDI President Bernard Kolélas was Mayor of Brazzaville, and Mampouya was his communications attaché.

Under serious pressure as a result of the 1997 civil war, President Pascal Lissouba appointed Kolélas, his old rival, as Prime Minister at the head of a national unity government in September 1997. Mampouya was then appointed as Kolélas' Political Adviser and Spokesman. Lissouba's attempt to secure his position through the formation of a national unity government was unsuccessful, however: the rebel forces loyal to Denis Sassou Nguesso captured Brazzaville in mid-October 1997, and Mampouya, who had a firm personal loyalty to Kolélas, fled into exile along with the MCDDI President on 14 October 1997.

In May 2000, a Congolese court sentenced Kolélas to death in absentia for war crimes. He was eventually allowed to return from exile to attend the funeral of his wife in October 2005; Sassou Nguesso granted Kolélas a special amnesty for the occasion on humanitarian grounds, enabling him to visit. The National Assembly unanimously adopted a law granting a full amnesty to Kolélas on 23 November 2005, thereby enabling him to resume his place in the nation's political life.

=== Government service ===
In mid-January 2007, Mampouya—acting as the representative of the MCDDI—met with François Ibovi, the Minister of Territorial Administration, to discuss preparations for the 2007 parliamentary election, along with representatives from various other parties.

The MCDDI signed an electoral alliance with President Sassou Nguesso's party, the Congolese Labour Party (PCT), on 23 April 2007. At the signing ceremony, Mampouya read aloud the terms of the agreement just before it was signed by Kolélas and PCT Secretary-General Ambroise Noumazalay.

In the June 2007 parliamentary election, Mampouya was the MCDDI candidate for the fourth constituency of Makélékélé, a district of Brazzaville. While campaigning, he called on the people to "give the PCT and MCDDI a majority that will enable them to govern the country together". In his constituency, he received 29.79% of the vote in the first round, slightly behind the former warlord and independent candidate Willy Matsanga, who received 30.65% of the vote. Since neither of them obtained a first round majority, the two proceeded to a second round in August 2007.

During his campaign for the second round, Mampouya vowed that, if elected, he would work energetically to solve his constituency's problems. He particularly focused on the problem of youth unemployment, promising to provide training programs for young people. Mampouya also said that he would work to improve the quality of education for children and provide resources to introduce children to new computer technology. The PCT supported Mampouya in the second round, and Mampouya praised the PCT's commitment to the alliance; he said that the PCT's efforts constituted "a model" for cooperation between the two parties and expressed optimism regarding the future of the alliance. Nevertheless, Matsanga defeated Mampouya in the second round, receiving 56.74% of the vote.

Despite his defeat in Makélékélé, Mampouya was appointed to the government as Minister of Scientific Research and Technical Innovation on 30 December 2007; along with Guy Brice Parfait Kolélas (Bernard Kolélas' son), he was one of two MCDDI members to be appointed to the government. Reacting to the appointment, Mampouya described it as "the most important of my entire political career" and thanked Sassou Nguesso. He took over from Pierre-Ernest Abandzounou at the ministry in January 2008. Mampouya then made visits to a large number of research centers in Pointe-Noire and Brazzaville in early February, meeting with the researchers and reviewing their work, as well as their working conditions.

The MCDDI held its First Convention on 24–25 May 2008 in Brazzaville. The meeting was notable for designating Brice Parfait Kolélas as the Coordinator of the MCDDI National Executive Bureau and National Secretary for Development Strategies, effectively making him the MCDDI's de facto leader in light of Bernard Kolélas' advanced age and failing health. Mampouya delivered the closing speech at the convention on behalf of Bernard Kolélas, who was present but chose not to give the speech himself.

As an ally of the PCT, the MCDDI supported Sassou Nguesso's bid for re-election in the July 2009 presidential election and Mampouya worked on his campaign. In his capacity as Interim Spokesman of the Government, Mampouya read a statement on 3 July 2009 that constituted a warning to the opposition. In the statement, he criticized some opposition leaders for resorting to "bellicose, seditious, dangerous, and misleading" rhetoric that could threaten the prevailing "climate of peace", and he warned them against any actions disturbing public order. However, he also expressed confidence that the election would be conducted "in peace and quiet".

At a rally in Brazzaville on 7 July 2009, Mampouya argued that Sassou Nguesso had concentrated on developing infrastructure during his previous seven years in office and that the infrastructure would facilitate future industrialization. He called on the people to vote for Sassou Nguesso in overwhelming numbers and warned them to be vigilant with regard to "troublemakers". After winning re-election, Sassou Nguesso moved Mampouya to the post of Minister of Fishing and Aquaculture on 15 September 2009.

Bernard Kolélas died on 13 November 2009. Following his death, Mampouya, as Spokesman of the MCDDI, expressed the commitment of all party members to continuing in his footsteps. Guy Brice Parfait Kolélas and Bernard Tchibambélela were considered the main potential successors to Kolélas, while Mampouya reportedly played a "balancing" role between the two sides.

Mampouya, still serving as Minister of Fishing and Aquaculture, stood again for the seat representing the fourth constituency of Makélékélé in the July–August 2012 parliamentary election. No candidate received a majority in the first round, leading Mampouya to again face the incumbent, Willy Matsanga, in a second round. However, Mampouya withdrew from the race a few days before the second round was held, reportedly due to concerns that there could be disorder in the constituency.

Following the 2012 election, Mampouya was moved to the post of Minister of Primary and Secondary Education and Literacy on 25 September 2012.

Mampouya and MCDDI leader Guy Brice Parfait Kolélas fell into conflict, and Mampouya eventually decided to create his own political party. He announced the creation of his new party, the Dynamic for the Republic and Recovery (DRD), on 18 May 2013.

As President of the DRD, Mampouya inaugurated a bridge in the Pool Department, connecting the Goma Tsé-Tsé and Mbanza-Ndounga districts, on 23 March 2014. The party had the bridge built by a private company in order to facilitate trade in the area and help local residents, who had long expressed a need for a bridge. On the same day, Mampouya also donated a generator to Kinkala's hospital—the most important hospital in the Pool Department—in order to remedy the power outages that plagued the facility.

Standing as a DRD candidate, Mampouya was elected as a local councillor in the Mfilou-Ngamaba section of Brazzaville in the September 2014 local elections.

On 10 August 2015, Mampouya was moved to the post of Minister of Posts and Telecommunications. After Sassou Nguesso's victory in the March 2016 presidential election, he moved Mampouya back to the post of Minister of Scientific Research and Technical Innovation on 30 April 2016.

Mampouya was dismissed from the government on 22 August 2017.
