= Music of the Republic of the Congo =

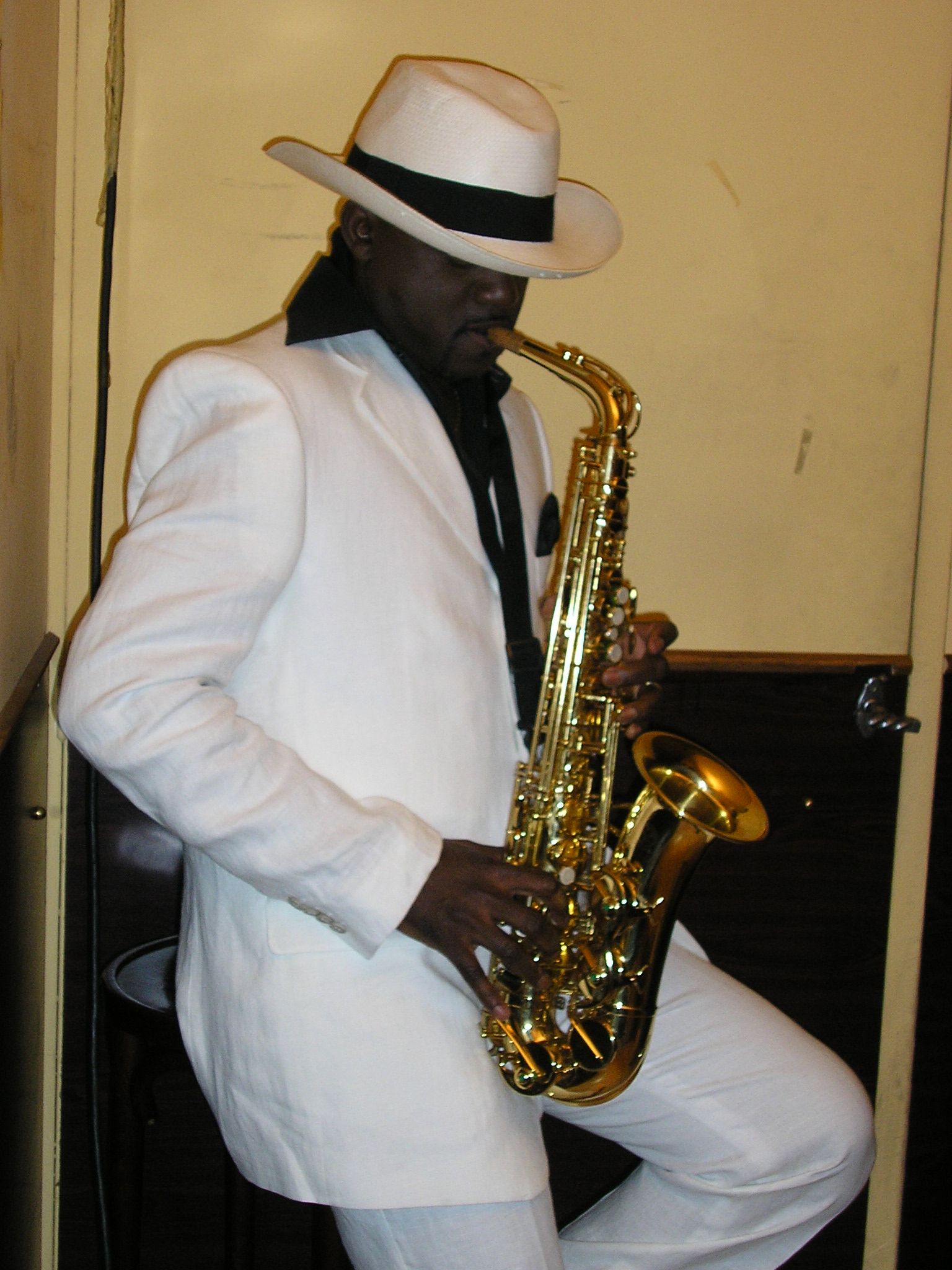
Congolese saxophonist Sam Talanis

The Republic of the Congo is an African nation with close musical ties to its neighbor, the Democratic Republic of the Congo. The Democratic Republic of the Congo's homegrown pop music, soukous, is popular across the border, and musicians from both countries have fluidly travelled throughout the region playing similarly styled music, including Nino Malapet and Jean Serge Essous. Brazzaville had a major music scene until unrest in the late 1990s, and produced popular bands like Extra Musica and Bantous de la Capitale that played an integral role in the development of soukous and other styles of Congolese popular music . The Hip-Hop group "Bisso na Bisso" also hails from Congo-Brazzaville.

== National music ==
The national anthem of the Republic of the Congo is La Congolaise. It was adopted upon independence in 1959, replaced in 1969 by Les Trois Glorieuses but reinstated in 1991. The words were written by Jacques Tondra and Georges Kibanghi, the music was composed by Jean Royer and Joseph Spadilière.

== Traditional music ==
Folk instruments in the Republic of the Congo include the xylophone and mvet. The mvet is a kind of zither-harp, similar to styles found elsewhere in both Africa and Asia. The mvet is made of a long tube with one or two gourds acting as resonators .

== Soukous ==
Though soukous has become much more closely associated with the popular music of the Democratic Republic of the Congo, early in the style's evolution both the local scenes of Kinshasa and Brazzaville played a very important role. In these cities, American style orchestras (called soukous, or kirikiri or kasongo) played rumba (a kind of Cuban music) influenced by traditional music and jazz. Soukous arose from this fusion of styles, popularized as dance music by a number of different orchestras in the 1950s and 60s.

== Sources ==
- Kubik, Gerhard: "Mvet", in: The New Grove Dictionary of Music and Musicians (Ed. by Stanley Sadie). macmillan Publishers, London 1981
- Bender, Wolfgang: "Sweet Mother - Moderne afrikanische Musik", 1985, Trickster Verlag, München. ISBN 3-923804-10-5 (in German language)
