= Kindamba =

- Village
- Location in the Republic of the Congo
- Coordinates: 3°44′5″S 14°30′35″E
- Country: Republic of the Congo
- Department: Pool
- District: Kindamba
- Elevation: 443 m (1,453 ft)

Population (2023)
  - Total: 9,270
- Area code: 242

Kindamba is a village in the Kindamba District of Pool Department, Republic of the Congo.

== History ==
Kindamba was a major city in the Pool Department until the mid-1990s, with a population of approximately 16,000. Most residents fled during the Republic of the Congo Civil War, and its schools, hospital and infrastructure were damaged or destroyed, including access to electricity and telecommunications. Most fled, including the World Food Programme station near Kindamba, and when the war concluded, 2–3,000 returned to little food.

By the 2000s, the only businesses were market stands, with the butcher being closed by authorities due to concerns of cattle raiding. Humanitarian efforts such as the International Committee of the Red Cross donated supplies, though were sometimes looted by remaining groups of Ninjas. On June 2, 2002, a United Nations helicopter delivered 7.7 megatons of supplies to the community. Humanitarian aid presisted through the resurface of the Ninjas in 2017 and 2018, and by 2019, half of the families were malnourished. Aid continues as of 2023.

== Transportation ==
Kindamba is served by Kindamba Airport.

== Ecology ==
In 2020, Kindamba had 254 kilohectares of forest, above 35% of its total area, down 23.7 kilohectares from 2000.

== Notable people ==
- Daniel Ndoundou (1911–1986), Protestant church leader
