= KNJ =

KNJ may refer to:

- Kindamba Airport (IATA: KNJ), Republic of the Congo
- Akatek language (ISO-639-3: knj), a Mayan language spoken in Guatemala
- Krishnanagar City Junction railway station (station code: KNJ), India
- Kodomo no Jikan, Japanese manga and anime series

== See also ==
- de:Kameradschaftsring Nationaler Jugendverbände, a neo-Nazi organisation
