= Daniel Ndoundou =

Congolese Protestant minister (1911–1986)

Personal life
- Born: 1 May 1911 Kindamba, French Congo
- Died: 6 January 1986 (aged 74) Montfermeil, France

Religious life
- Religion: Protestantism
- Church: Evangelical Church of Congo
- Ordination: June 16, 1946

Senior posting
- Awards: Order of Congolese Merit

Daniel Ndoundou (or Danieli; 1 May 1911 – 6 January 1986) was a Congolese Protestant minister. A pastor of the Evangelical Church of Congo, he led the Christian revival of the Republic of the Congo.

== Early life and education ==
Ndoundou was born on 1 May 1911, in Kindamba (then part of French Congo), the son of Nsemi Mboko and Bouanga Bua Mboukou. His father was not Christian, though his mother was, so he and his siblings were raised as such. He was close with his paternal uncle, evangelist Nsemi Noé.

Ndoundou was baptized on 6 June 1923, at the Kingoyi mission station, with him losing his mother the same year. Although from the Republic of the Congo, he was educated at schools in the Democratic Republic of the Congo; from 1922 to 1925, he attended school in Kimwenza, and from 1925 to 1928, attended school in Kingoyi. He then became a train dispatcher for the Matadi–Kinshasa Railway. From 1929 to 1930, he studied at the Mukimbungu Bible School.

== Religious career ==
Ndoundou worked a well-paying job in the Democratic Republic of the Congo, though, in 1931, he returned to the Republic of the Congo. He then became a traveling evangelist for the Swedish Evangelical Mission in Ngouédi. From 1933 to 1936, he studied at the Seminary of Ngouédi, afterwards working as an evangelist for the village. From 1941 to 1943, he and his wife, studied at the School of Pastors and Teachers, in Kimpese.

On 16 June 1946, Ndoundou was ordained a pastor into the Evangelical Church of Congo (ECC), in Dolisie. In 1947, Ngouédi and the surrounding region was amid a religious drought. The prayers of student Raymond Buana Kibongui and pastor John Magnusson brought religion back to the community. Kibongui left on scholarship and Ndoundou became a figure in the revival. From 1947 to 1965, he was a member of the Synodal Council, which led a Christian revival in the Republic of the Congo. He was a widely-visited faith healer among the Congolese, reportedly curing medical problems through prayer.

From 1950 to 1974, Ndoundou hosted biannual religious conferences in Kindamba. In 1963, 260,000 attended the conference, including President Fulbert Youlou. He was a spiritual advisor to President Alphonse Massamba-Débat.

In 1960, Ndoundou was made the national pastor-evangelist of the Evangelical Church of Congo (ECC), which he remained as until his retirement. He supported independence of the Congolese church and government. Upon the independence of the ECC from the Swedish Church, in 1961, he was made its vice-president, which he was until 1965. In 1963, he was awarded the Order of Congolese Merit. In 1970, he and his family moved to Loutété. He acted as a mediator for interpersonal and interethnic conflicts, which earned him the nickname "Vukamakanda". In 1970, he visited churches in Scandinavia.

Ndoundou often had theophanies in his dreams which guided his religious work. As a preacher, he often employed slogans, including "Sala-sambila, sambila-sala" (work-pray, pray-work) and "sikama, siama, tatamana, ndungunu" (Wake up, take courage, persevere, victory). He believed that the ECC never schism. He was inspired by Simon Kimbangu.

== Personal life and death ==
Ndoundou was married to Charlotte Nsouka; together they had two children, with her dying in 1937, during the birth of their second child. In 1941, he married Nsungi Mickaelle. She died in 1951, and in 1954, he married Henriette Mpombo, a primary school teacher. He retired in 1984. Also in 1984, he suffered a stroke due to high blood pressure. In 1985, he was admitted to the Montfermeil Hospital. He died on 6 January 1986, aged 74, in Montfermeil.
