= Mindouli District =

Coordinates: 4°11′S 14°22′E

Mindouli
- District
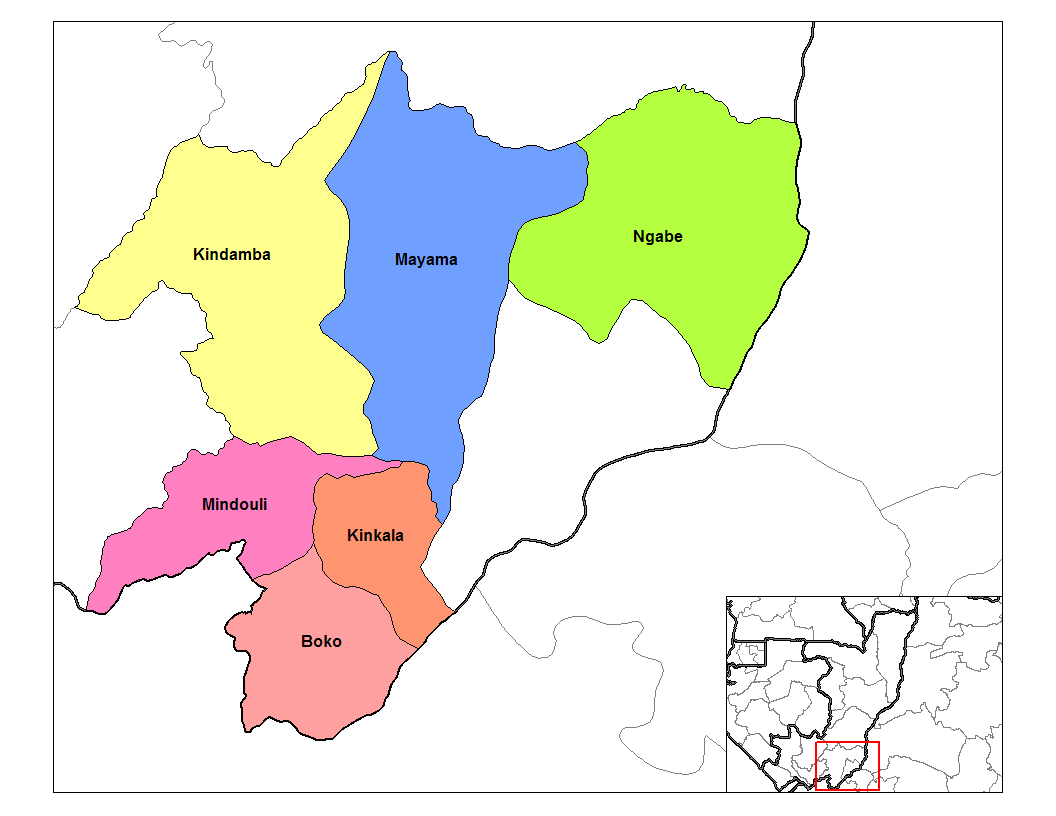
- Mindouli District in the department
- Country: Republic of the Congo
- Department: Pool Department

Area
  - Total: 1,042 sq mi (2,699 km^{2})

Population (2023 census)
  - Total: 63,954
  - Density: 61.37/sq mi (23.70/km^{2})
- Time zone: UTC+1 (GMT +1)

Mindouli (can also be written as Minduli) is a district in the Pool Department of south-eastern Republic of the Congo. The capital lies at Mindouli.

== Towns and villages ==
- Mindouli
