= 2002–2003 conflict in the Pool Department =

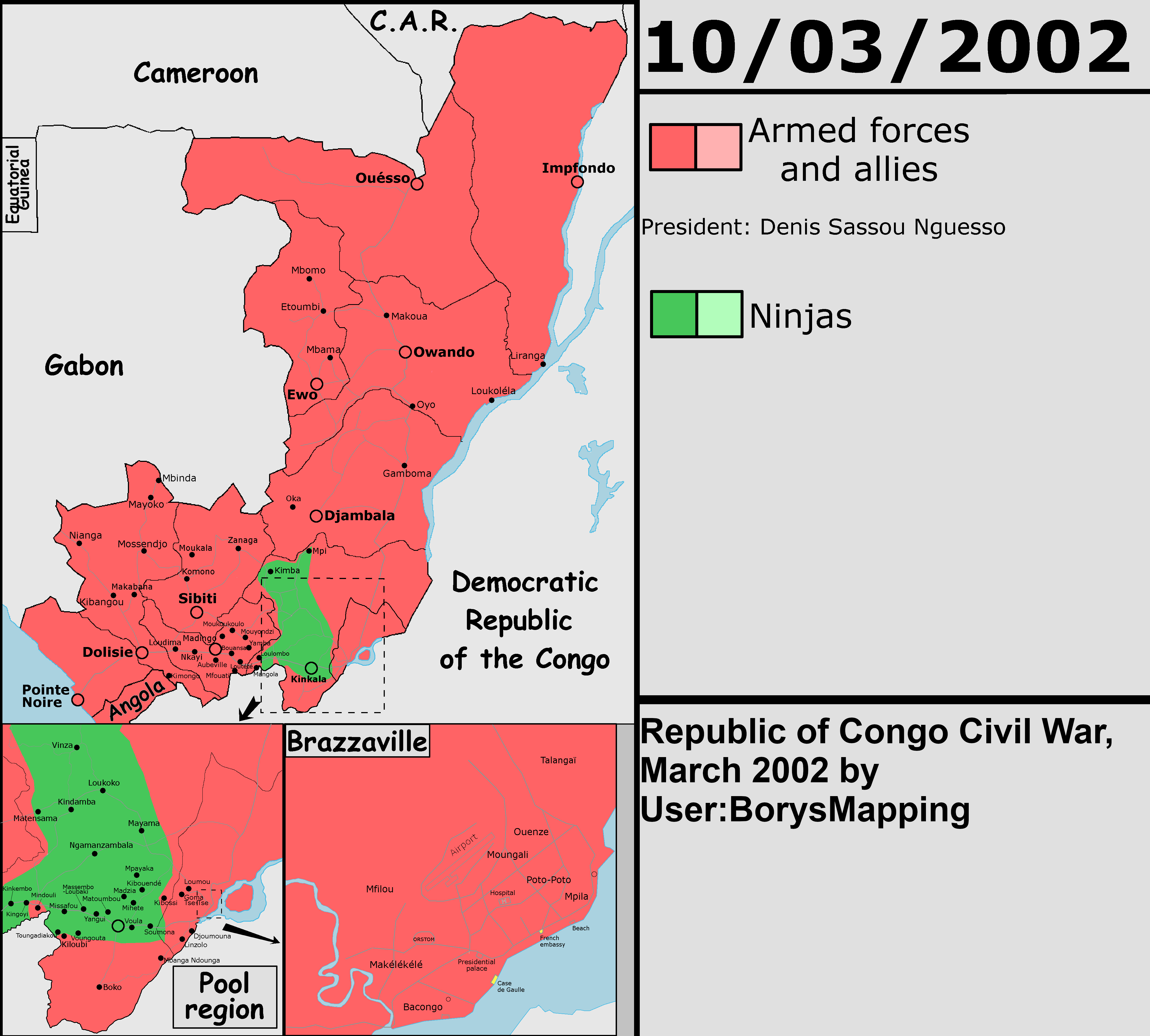
- Presence of Ninja militias in 2002
| Date | March 2002 – 17 March 2003 |
| Location | Pool Department, Republic of the Congo |
| Result | Ceasefire |

Belligerents
| Republic of the Congo | Ninja militia |

Commanders and leaders
| Denis Sassou Nguesso | Frédéric Bintsamou |

Units involved
| Armed Forces of the Republic of the Congo | None |

Strength
| Unknown | Unknown |

Casualties and losses
| Unknown | Unknown |
- At least 100 civilians killed 200,000 internally displaced

The 2002–2003 conflict in the Pool Department was a military conflict between the government of the Republic of the Congo and the rebel Ninja militia which lasted from 2002 to 2003. It began in March 2002, when clashes between Ninja militias and the government drove thousands of civilians from their homes. On 12 March 2003, it was reported by the European Commission that the conflict had left 200,000 people "vulnerable and displaced". The conflict ended on 17 March 2003, when the government and the rebels signed a ceasefire.

== Background ==
The Ninja militias and other militias had been demobilizing and reintegrating for while after the Republic of the Congo Civil War (1997–1999) ended. On 19 July 2001, a new program called the Haut Commissariat pour le Demobilisiation et Reinsertion des exCombatant (HC, hereafter) was set up to reintegrate approximately 9,000 ex-combatants from three militias including the Ninjas. To help in the effort the HC, the HC started negotiations with the Ninja to help increase disarmament and reintegration efforts in the Pool district.

Thing went smoothly until 21 March 2002 when Ninja leader Frederic Bitsangou terminated negotiations between the HC and Ninja during a press with the High Commissioner of the HC Minister Ngakala. This termination could have been anywhere from a tantamount to a declaration of war, but the Republic of the Congo still increased its military pressure against the Pool region.

== Timeline ==
The fighting in Pool began in late March 2002, when Ninja militiamen attacked several government military positions in the region. The Ninjas claimed the attack was provoked when they discovered government plans to arrest their leader, Frédéric Bintsamou.

After the Ninjas allegedly attacked a train on 2 April 2002, the government reduced humanitarian agencies' ability to access the region and began an armed response against the Ninjas. This escalation led to the internal displacement of 75,000 people, and to an unknown number of deaths. Due to military bombardments during this time the UNDP was unable to support the reintegration of ex-combatants which was originally requested by the government. On 14 June, a battle in an airport in Brazzaville resulted in 100 people being killed.

By December 2002 the government began a practice called "humanitarian corridors", where they would allow Ninja militiamen to leave the Pool district and reintegrate. Between June and December 2002, the Brazzaville Military Hospital reported 262 wounded in-patients, of which 121 were civilians and 141 were military.

The conflict was ended by a ceasefire signed on 17 March 2003.

== Human rights violations ==
According to a witnesses, government forces had launched helicopter attacks on inhabited villages in the Pool region, killing and wounding "an unknown number of civilians" with indiscriminate rocket and machine-gun fire. She also said that uniformed men were raping women and young men were being abducted from IDP camps. There were also lots of destruction of houses in property in Pool.
