= Louingui District =

Louingui
- District
- Interactive map of Louingui
- Country: Republic of the Congo
- Department: Pool Department

Area
  - Total: 287.1 sq mi (743.7 km^{2})

Population (2023 census)
  - Total: 11,933
  - Density: 41.56/sq mi (16.05/km^{2})
- Time zone: UTC+1 (GMT +1)

Louingui (can also be written as Luingi or Lwingi) is a district in the Pool Department of Republic of the Congo.
