= Nsiloulou =

Militia in the Republic of the Congo

- Leader: Frédéric Bintsamou
- Founded: 1997
- Dates active: 1997–present
- Split from: Ninja
- Country: Republic of the Congo
- Active regions: Pool Department
- Status: Active

Nsiloulou is a Congolese paramilitary organization that participated in the Second Republic of the Congo Civil War and the Pool War.

== History ==
Nsiloulou was established by Frédéric Bintsamou in 1997 as a faction of the Ninja who opposed Guy Brice Parfait Kolélas. Nsiloulou is most active in the Pool Department of the Republic of the Congo. Nsiloulou recruited thousands of local residents of Pool that year. Political scientists John F. Clark and Brett L. Carter argue that Nsiloulou's creation was supported by Denis Sassou Nguesso, who was fighting against Bintsamou during the Second Republic of the Congo Civil War, in order to "cleanse Pool of its ethnic Lari population rather than protect it".

Nsiloulou was involved in the Pool War of 2016 to 2017, during which the United States Department of State stated that there was credible evidence that Nsiloulou engaged in human rights abuses. Continued 2024 skirmishes in Pool involving Nsiloulou left 13,000 people displaced.
