= La Congolaise =

National anthem of the Republic of the Congo

English: The Congolese
- National anthem of the Republic of the Congo
- Lyrics: Jacques Tondra and Georges Kibanghi
- Music: Jean Royer and Joseph Spadilière
- Adopted: 1959
- Readopted: 1991
- Relinquished: 1969
- Preceded by: "Les Trois Glorieuses" (1969–1991)

Audio sample
- U.S. Navy Band instrumental version (one verse and chorus): file; help

"La Congolaise" (English: "The Congolese"; Kongo: "Besi Kôngo") is the national anthem of the Republic of the Congo. It was adopted upon independence from France in 1959, replaced in 1969 by "Les Trois Glorieuses" but reinstated in 1991. The lyrics were written by Jacques Tondra and Georges Kibanghi, and the music was composed by Jean Royer and Joseph Spadilière.

== Lyrics ==
The first verse and chorus constitute as the official national anthem and are most commonly played during events.

French official

I
En ce jour le soleil se lève
Et notre Congo resplendit.
Une longue nuit s'achève,
Un grand bonheur a surgi.
Chantons tous avec ivresse
Le chant de la liberté.

Refrain :
Congolais, debout fièrement partout,
Proclamons l'union de notre nation,
Oublions ce qui nous divise,
Soyons plus unis que jamais,
Vivons pour notre devise:
Unité, travail, progrès,
Vivons pour notre devise:
Unité, travail, progrès!

II
Des forêts jusqu'à la savanne,
Des savannes jusqu'à la mer,
Un seul peuple, une seule âme,
Un seul cœur, ardent et fier,
Luttons tous, tant que nous sommes,
Pour notre vieux pays noir.

Refrain

III
Et s'il nous faut mourir, en somme
Qu'importe puisque nos enfants,
Partout, pourront dire comme
On triomphe en combattant,
Et dans le moindre village
Chantent sous nos trois couleurs.

Refrain

English translation

I
On this day the sun rises
And our Congo stands resplendent.
A long night is ended,
A great happiness has come.
Let us all, with wild joyfulness, sing
The song of freedom.

Chorus:
Arise, Congolese, proud every man,
Proclaim the unity of our nation.
Let us forget what divides us
And become more united than ever.
Let us live our motto:
Unity, work, progress.
Let us live our motto:
Unity, work, progress!

II
From the forest to the savannah,
From the savannah to the sea,
One people, one soul,
One heart, ardent and proud.
Let us all fight, every one of us,
For our black country.

Chorus

III
And if we have to die,
What does it really matter? Our children
Everywhere will be able to say how
Triumph comes through battle,
And in the smallest village
Sing beneath our three colours.

Chorus
