= Loumo District =

Loumo
- District
- Interactive map of Loumo
- Country: Republic of the Congo
- Department: Pool Department

Area
  - Total: 258.9 sq mi (670.6 km^{2})

Population (2023 census)
  - Total: 5,592
  - Density: 21.60/sq mi (8.339/km^{2})
- Time zone: UTC+1 (GMT +1)

Loumo (can also be written as Lumo) is a district in the Pool Department of Republic of the Congo.
