= Mindouli =

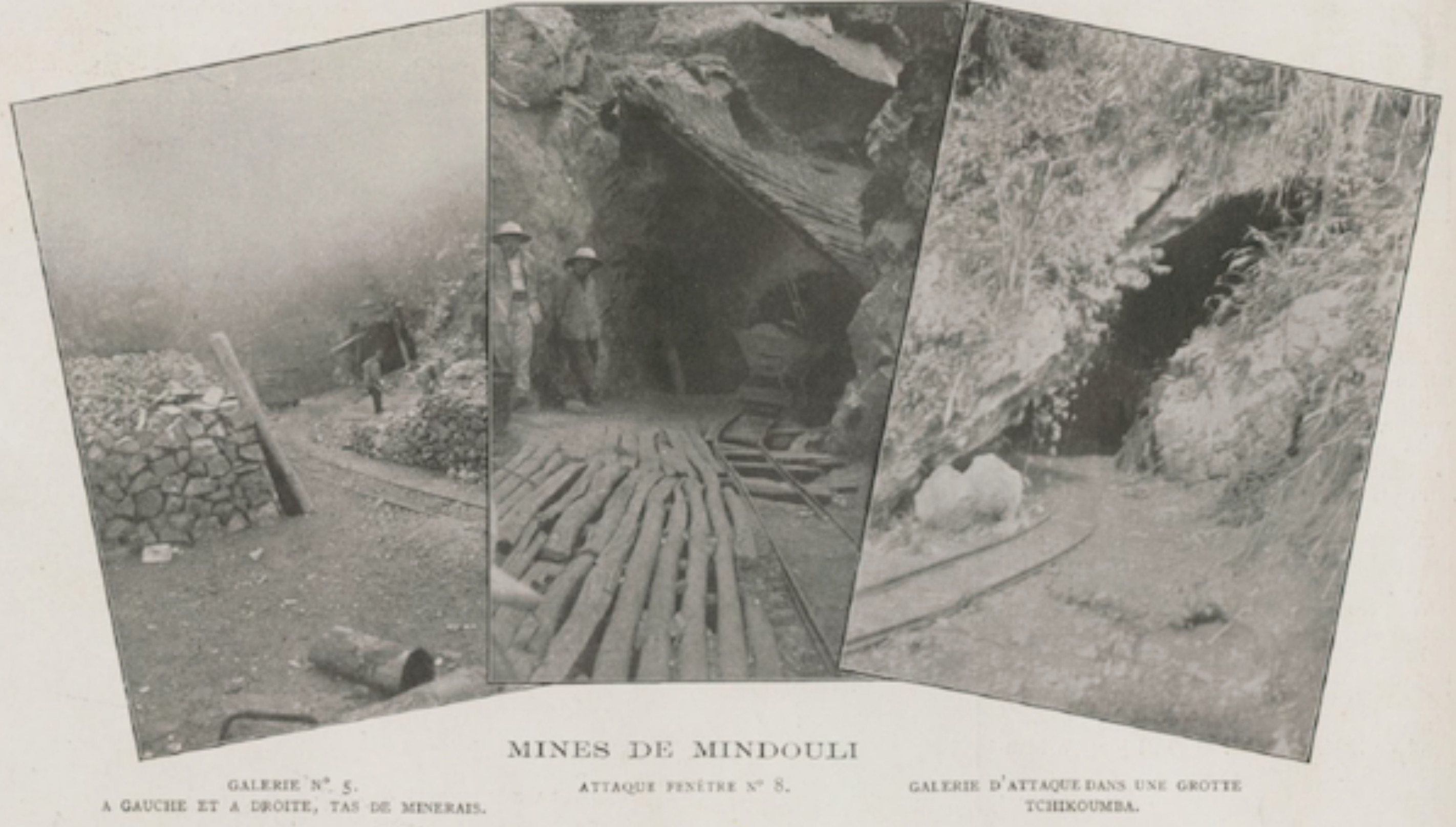
- Mindouli Mines: Gallery N° 5 on the left and right, heap of ores and Decauville rail track. Attack gallery at Tchikoumba cave, ca 1910

- Location in the Republic of the Congo
- Coordinates: 4°16′29″S 14°21′27″E
- Country: Republic of the Congo
- Department: Pool
- District: Mindouli

Population (2023 census)
  - Total: 29,603

Mindouli (can also be written as Minduli) is a town in the Republic of Congo. This is the seat of the Mindouli District in the Pool Department. It is very close to the border with the Democratic Republic of the Congo.

== Transport ==
Mindouli is served by a station on the main line of the Congo-Ocean Railway.

== See also ==
- Railway stations in Congo
