= Kindamba District =

Coordinates: 3°25′S 14°27′E

Kindamba
- District
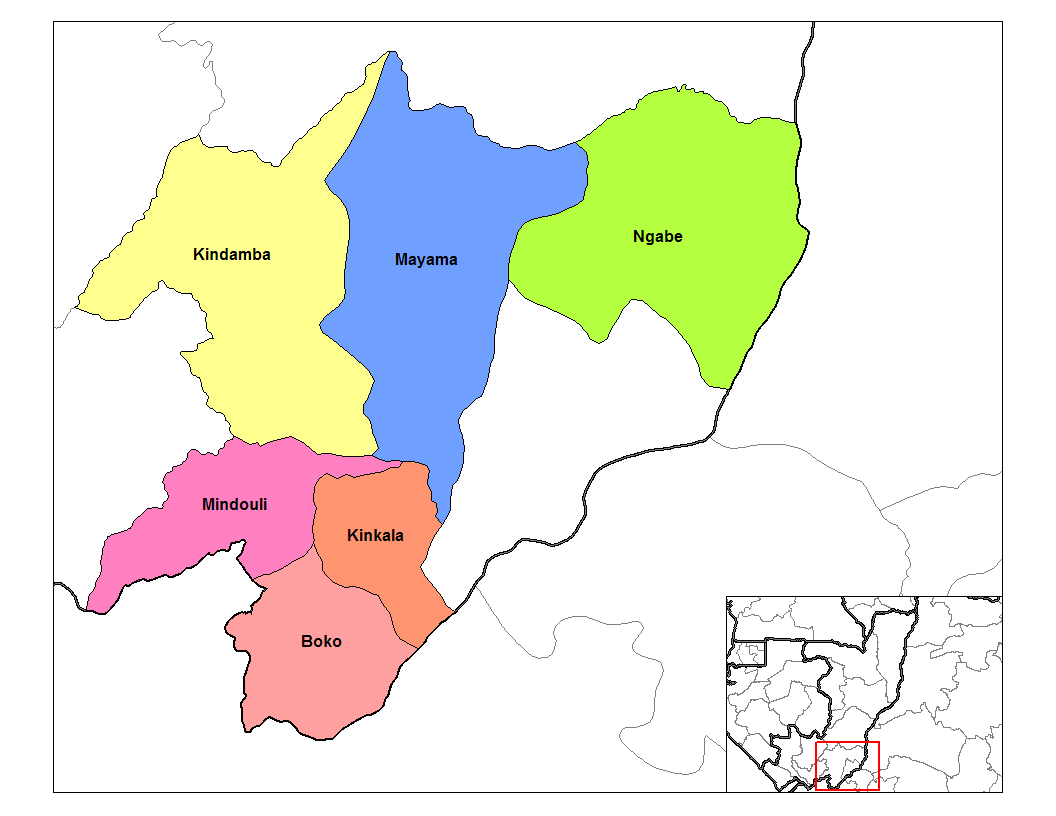
- Kindamba District in the department
- Country: Republic of the Congo
- Department: Pool Department

Area
  - Total: 615 sq mi (1,592 km^{2})

Population (2023 census)
  - Total: 19,894
  - Density: 32.37/sq mi (12.50/km^{2})
- Time zone: UTC+1 (GMT +1)

Kindamba is a district in the Pool Department of southern Republic of the Congo. The capital lies at Kindamba.
