= Jean-Dominique Okemba =

Congolese military and political figure

Jean-Dominique Okemba is a Congolese military and political figure. He has been a special adviser to the President of Congo-Brazzaville, Denis Sassou Nguesso, since 1997, and he has also been the secretary-general of the National Security Council since 2002. He is a nephew of Sassou Nguesso.

== Military and political career ==
Okemba served in the navy of Congo-Brazzaville; by 2002 he held the rank of Ship-of-the-Line Captain (Capitaine de vaisseau).

Sassou Nguesso regained power at the end of the June–October 1997 civil war and appointed Okemba as a Special Adviser to the President in late 1997. Okemba, who was a nephew of Sassou Nguesso, was viewed in the late 1990s as the leader of the clan of close family members surrounding Sassou Nguesso, which competed for high-level influence with other clans belonging to Sassou Nguesso's Mbochi ethnic group.

As Special Adviser to the President, Okemba was sometimes dispatched on special diplomatic missions. He was sent to Morocco in late September 2001 to meet with King Mohammed VI and inquire about Morocco's position regarding the candidacy of the Congolese diplomat Henri Lopes for the post of Secretary-General of La Francophonie. On 21 June 2002, he met with Joseph Kabila, the President of Democratic Republic of Congo, delivering a message from Sassou Nguesso, discussing increased cooperation, and subsequently emphasizing the prospect of "good neighborly relations" between the two countries.

Okemba created a political association bearing his own name, which was active in the promotion of health initiatives, including the fight against AIDS and sexually-transmitted diseases, with a focus on rural areas and community health.

On 30 December 2002, President Sassou Nguesso appointed Okemba as Secretary-General of the National Security Council, a newly created body that was tasked with overseeing and coordinating state security; Okemba also retained his existing post as Special Adviser to the President. The Council operated under Sassou Nguesso's personal authority, while Okemba led its work as secretary-general. It plays a key role in supervising intelligence work.

As Secretary-General of the National Security Council and a key member of the clan of family members surrounding President Sassou Nguesso, Okemba was a very influential figure during the 2000s and was nicknamed "Mr. Vice-President" (Monsieur le vice-président). Despite Okemba's influence, his activities were often not public, as Sassou Nguesso tended to assign him responsibility for "secret missions and discreet matters". He was believed to have marginalized Pierre Oba, the powerful Minister of Security, during the mid-2000s.

By 2004, Okemba had been promoted to the rank of Counter Admiral (contre-amiral). Okemba was awarded France's Legion of Honour by the French Ambassador to Congo-Brazzaville, Jean-François Valette, on 10 February 2011.

Together with Basile Ikouebé, the Congolese Minister of Foreign Affairs, Okemba represented Sassou Nguesso at the inauguration of Senegalese President Macky Sall on 2 April 2012. After the inauguration, he delivered a message from Sassou Nguesso to Sall.

Okemba was promoted to the rank of vice admiral in February 2013. His influence had reportedly diminished by 2013, although he remained in his post as Secretary-General of the National Security Council.

In 2014, Okemba was alleged to have used BGFIBank Congo, a bank of which he is chairman, to smuggle funds received by Proparco back to Congo via the company Alios Finance Congo.
