= Pierre Oba =

Congolese security official (born 1953)

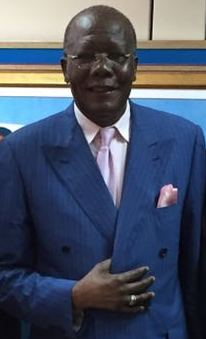
Minister of Mines, Pierre Oba (center) - Validation mission in Republic of the Congo, May 2017

Pierre Oba (born 17 July 1953) is a Congolese security official who has served in the government of Congo-Brazzaville as Minister of Mines since 2005. During the 1980s, he served successively as Director of Presidential Security and as Director-General of Public Security. Later, he was Minister of the Interior from 1997 to 2002 and Minister of Security from 2002 to 2005. He is also a Général de Brigade of the National Police.

== Background and early military–political career ==
Oba, an ethnic Mbochi, was born at Ollembé, located in the Ollombo District. He is a cousin of Congolese President Denis Sassou-Nguesso. Oba became Director of Presidential Security in 1984 and was named Director-General of Public Security on 11 September 1987. In 1989, he was elected to the Central Committee of the Congolese Labour Party (PCT).

In the early 1990s, when the PCT's single-party rule collapsed and multiparty politics was introduced, Oba lost his post as Director-General of Public Security; subsequently he served as aide-de-camp to Sassou Nguesso. Along with Colonel Michel Ngakala, he created the "Cobras", a militia loyal to opposition leader Sassou-Nguesso, in 1993.

== Political career since 1997 ==
Oba participated in the June–October 1997 civil war on Sassou Nguesso's side and was wounded in the fighting. After Sassou Nguesso's Cobra militia returned him to power in October 1997, Oba was appointed as Minister of the Interior, Security, and Territorial Administration on 2 November 1997. He was the only member of the government who did not stand as a candidate in the May–June 2002 parliamentary election. After the election, in the government named on 18 August 2002, Oba was appointed as Minister of Security and Police.

Oba was believed to have been marginalized by Jean-Dominique Okemba, another influential security official and Sassou Nguesso relative, during the mid-2000s. In the government named on 7 January 2005, he was moved to the position of Minister of Mines, Mining Industries, and Geology; the move decreased Oba's prominence.

Following the death of Jean-Baptiste Tati Loutard, the Minister of State for Hydrocarbons, in July 2009, Oba additionally managed his portfolio in an interim capacity. He was retained as Minister of Mines and Geology in the government appointed on 15 September 2009, but was released from his interim responsibility for the hydrocarbons portfolio.

In August 2013, he was probed by French authorities for the alleged role he may have played in human rights abuses during the 1997 civil war.
