= Pierre-Ernest Abandzounou =

Congolese politician

- Born: 1946
- Died: 3 July 2018 (aged 71–72)
- Occupation: politician
- Notable work: Secretary of State for Scientific Research from August 2002 to January 2005; Minister of Scientific Research from January 2005 to December 2007

Pierre-Ernest Abandzounou (1946 – 3 July 2018) was a Congolese politician. He served in the government of Congo-Brazzaville as Secretary of State for Scientific Research from August 2002 to January 2005 and then as Minister of Scientific Research from January 2005 to December 2007. He was also the President of the Action Committee for Progress (CAP) from 2005 to 2011. Starting in 2012, he was Congo-Brazzaville's Ambassador to Chad.

== Political career ==
Abandzounou was a professor and researcher at the Marien Ngouabi University in Brazzaville, lecturing on history and civilizations. He also served for a time as Director of the Cabinet of the Minister of Scientific Research and the Environment. In that capacity, he was involved in organizing the first Congress of African Scientists, which was held in Brazzaville on 25–30 June 1987.

Following the introduction of multiparty politics in the early 1990s, Abandzounou joined the Union of Democratic Forces (UFD), a political party led by Charles David Ganao. In the 1992 parliamentary election and the 1993 parliamentary election, Ganao was elected to the National Assembly as the UFD candidate in the Djambala constituency, located in the Plateaux Region, and Abandzounou ran alongside him as his alternate for that seat. The UFD supported President Pascal Lissouba during that period, and Abandzounou was appointed to the government as Minister-Delegate for Relations with Parliament on 23 January 1995.

Abandzounou was Secretary-General of the UFD as of 2001. In anticipation of the 2002 parliamentary election, the UFD signed an electoral alliance with President Denis Sassou Nguesso's Congolese Labour Party (PCT) in late 2001. In a statement on that occasion, Abandzounou said that the alliance was for "democracy and free expression, the establishment of the rule of law, and the irreversibility of political change through the ballot box", and he praised the commitment of Ganao and Sassou Nguesso to peace and reconciliation.

In the May 2002 parliamentary election, Abandzounou was the UFD candidate in Djambala. He won the seat in the first round with 57.43% of the vote. Following the election, Sassou Nguesso appointed him to the government on 18 August 2002 as Secretary of State for Scientific Research. In that post, he worked under the Minister of Higher Education and Scientific Research, Henri Ossébi. In a statement to mark International Science Day on 10 November 2002, Abandzounou stressed the importance of science in contributing to sustainable development.

Abandzounou was promoted to the post of Minister of Scientific Research and Technical Innovation on 7 January 2005. In an August 2005 interview, he emphasized that research was "an engine of socio-economic development for our country". He opened the Third African Summit on Science and New Technologies, which was held in Brazzaville, on 24 October 2005.

On 12 November 2005, Abandzounou founded a political association, the Action Committee for Progress (Comité d'action pour le progrès, CAP). As a result, he and two others who had also participated in the creation of the CAP were expelled from the UFD on 26 November 2005. Although Abandzounou had been considered "one of David-Charles Ganao's closest collaborators" and potentially Ganao's successor in the party leadership, his decision to establish his own association and the UFD's subsequent decision to expel him from the party were consistent with a general trend toward fractionalization among political groups in Congo-Brazzaville.

Various UFD leaders—including Séraphin Onsuené, who was sitting in the National Assembly as the alternate deputy for Abandzounou's constituency of Djambala—visited the party strongholds of Djambala and Ngo in early December 2005 to explain the developments to UFD supporters. Characterizing the foundation of the CAP as a barely concealed move towards the creation of a new party, they argued that Abandzounou had acted contrary to the party's rules and expressed suspicion that he had been bribed to divide and weaken the UFD. They also urged party members and supporters to reject and oppose Abandzounou.

Identified with the political left, the CAP firmly supported President Sassou Nguesso and espoused various ideas typical of the Congolese political scene, such as rural development, social and cultural development, the strengthening of democracy and human rights, national unity, and environmental protection. In a speech marking the first anniversary of the CAP on 12 November 2006, Abandzounou said that the CAP would bring to the political scene an emphasis on the values of "efficiency, pragmatism, openness, [and] listening".

At a special session of the CAP National Council, held on 13 January 2007 at Makabandilou in Brazzaville, the association was converted into a political party so that it could run candidates in the 2007 parliamentary election. Abandzounou was retained as Minister of Scientific Research and Technical Education in the government appointed on 3 March 2007. He chose to run again in the June 2007 parliamentary election as the CAP candidate in Djambala; in the election he faced UFD candidate Séraphin Onsuené, who had previously held the seat as his alternate.

As Djambala was considered the stronghold of support for both the UFD and the newly established CAP, the 2007 election was hotly contested and the outcome was crucial for both parties. UFD supporters argued that Abandzounou had only won the seat in 2002 because he had the backing of Ganao. To a large extent, the 2007 election was considered a battle between Abandzounou and Ganao, his former political mentor. Ganao retired from active politics in May 2007, but he remained influential as "patriarch" of the UFD. The election in Djambala and four other constituencies was held over again on 8 July 2007 due to local difficulties. Onsuené defeated Abandzounou in the first round of the re-vote, receiving 55.64% of the vote.

A large coalition of parties and associations supporting Sassou Nguesso, the Rally of the Presidential Majority (RMP), was established on 20 December 2007, and the CAP joined it. With his party having failed to obtain representation in the National Assembly, Abandzounou was dismissed from the government on 30 December 2007; he passed control of the Ministry of Scientific Research to his successor, Hellot Matson Mampouya, in January 2008. Abandzounou remained at the helm of the CAP in 2008, and the party continued to support Sassou Nguesso. The CAP participated in the 2008 local elections as part of the RMP.

In July 2011, the CAP joined several small parties in choosing to merge itself into Sassou Nguesso's own party, the Congolese Labour Party (PCT). Abandzounou said that the party wanted to affirm its support for Sassou Nguesso and assist him in modernizing the country. At the PCT's Sixth Extraordinary Congress, held later in July 2011, Abandzounou was elected to the PCT's 471-member Central Committee.

Abandzounou was appointed as Ambassador to Chad on 3 May 2012. He presented his credentials to Chadian President Idriss Deby later in the year.

Abandzounou was appointed as Ambassador to Equatorial Guinea and presented his credentials to President Teodoro Obiang Nguema Mbasogo on February 19, 2018.
