= Kindamba Airport =

- IATA: KNJ; ICAO: FCBK

Summary
- Serves: Kindamba, Republic of the Congo
- Elevation AMSL: 1,460 ft / 445 m
- Coordinates: 3°44′55″S 14°29′30″E

Map
- Location of airport in the Republic of the Congo

Runways
Direction	Length		Surface
Direction	m	ft	Surface
06/24	1,400	4,593	Grass
- Source: Great Circle Mapper OurAirports

Kindamba Airport (IATA: KNJ, ICAO: FCBK) is an airstrip serving the village of Kindamba, Republic of the Congo. The runway is 2 kilometres (1.2 mi) southwest of the village.

== See also ==
- Transport in the Republic of the Congo
- List of airports in Republic of the Congo
