= Les Trois Glorieuses =

National anthem of the People's Republic of the Congo (1970–1991)

English: Three Glorious Days
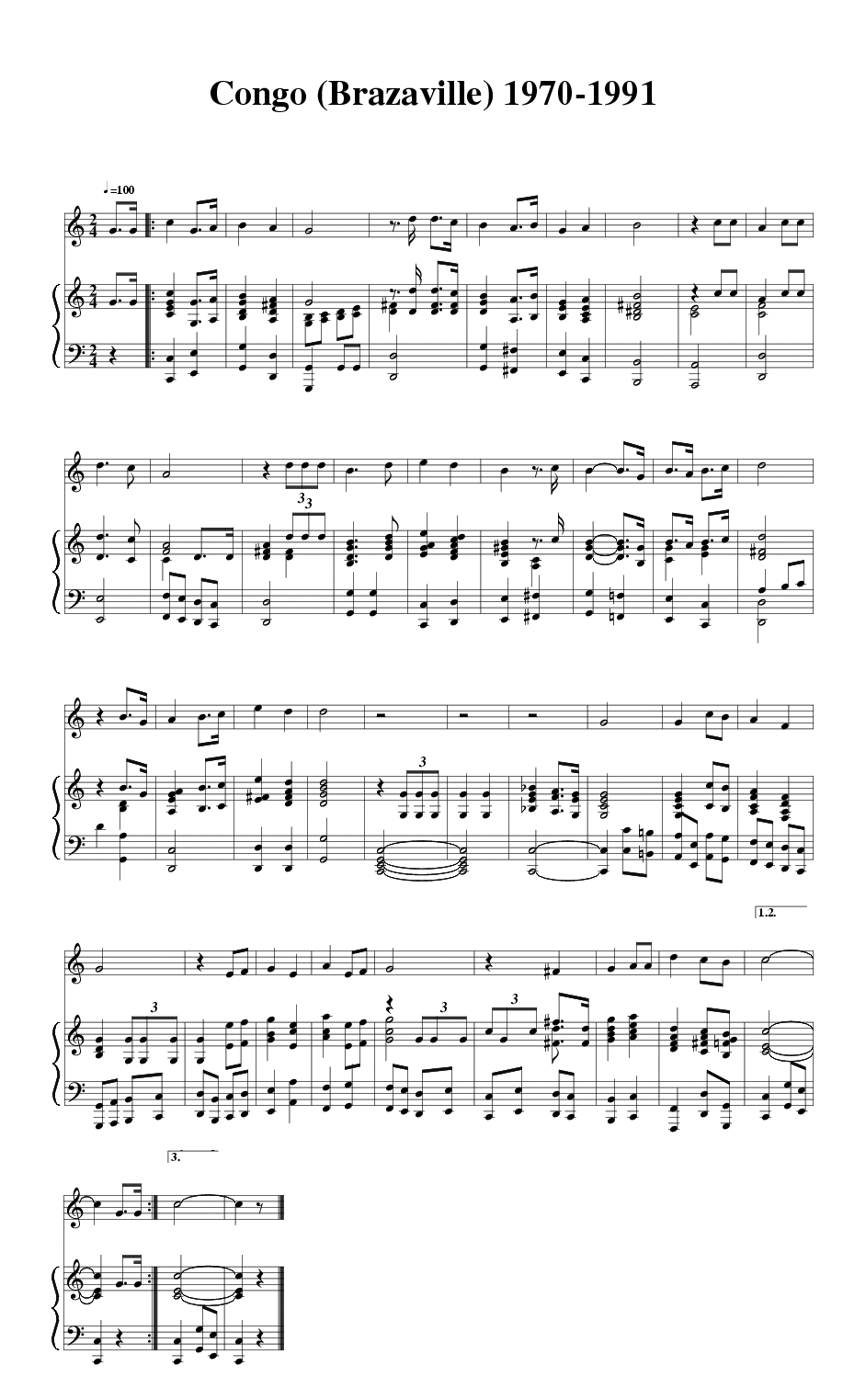
- National anthem of the People's Republic of Congo
- Lyrics: Henri Lopès
- Music: Philippe Mockouamy
- Adopted: January 1, 1970
- Relinquished: 1990
- Preceded by: "La Congolaise"
- Succeeded by: "La Congolaise"

Audio sample
- The instrumental version of the anthem.: file; help

"Les Trois Glorieuses" was the anthem of the People's Republic of the Congo from January 1, 1970, through 1991, when the original anthem, "La Congolaise", was restored.

The anthem was named after a three-day uprising in 1963 that resulted in the overthrow of the first President, Fulbert Youlou.

The lyrics were written by Henri Lopès, and the music was composed by Philippe Mockouamy. Mockouamy was at the time a colonel in the Congolese Army and served in its main military band from 1970 to 1990.

== Lyrics ==
French original

I
Lève-toi, Patrie courageuse,
Toi qui en trois journées glorieuses
Saisis et porte le drapeau
Pour un Congo libre et nouveau,
Qui ne jamais plus ne faillira, (Note: Sometimes written Qui jamais plus ne faillira.)
Que personne n'effrayera.

Refrain:
Nous avons brisés nos chaines,
Nous travaillerons sans peine,
Nous sommes une Nation souveraine.

II
Si trop tôt me tue l'ennemi,
Brave camarade, saisis mon fusil;
Et si la balle touche mon coeur,
Toutes nos soeurs se lèveront sans peur,
Et nos monts, nos flots en fureur
Repousseront l'envahisseur.

Refrain

III
Ici commence la Patrie
Où chaque humain a le même prix.
Notre seul guide c'est le Peuple.
Notre génie c'est encore le Peuple.
C'est lui seul qui a décidé
De rétablir sa dignité.

Refrain

Lingala translation

I
Tɛlɛmá, Mboka ya Tata ya mpiko,
Yo oyo na mikolo misato ya nkembo
Bokanga mpe bomema drapo
Pona Kongó ya ofele pe ya sika,
Nani akozanga lisusu te,
Ete moto moko te akobangisa.

Chorale ya miziki :
Tobukaki minyɔlɔlɔ na biso
Tokosala mosala kozanga ete tósala milende,
Tozali Ekolo oyo ezali na bokonzi.

II
Soki monguna abomi ngai noki mingi,
Camarade ya mpiko, kanga munduki na ngai;
Mpe soki lisasi ebɛti motema na ngai,
Bandeko na biso nyonso ya basi bakosekwa kozanga kobanga,
Mpe bangomba na biso, mbonge na biso oyo ezali konguluma
Bengana moto oyo azali kobundisa yango.

Chorale ya miziki

III
Awa ebandi mboka
Esika mutu nionso azalaka na ntalo moko.
Motambwisi na biso kaka moko ezali Bato.
Mayele na biso ezali kaka bato.
Ye moko nde azwaki ekateli
Mpo na kozongisa lokumu na ye.

Chorale ya miziki

English translation

I
Stand up, courageous homeland
You who in three glorious days
Seized the flag and opened the door
For a free and new Congo,
That never again will fail,
Frighten anyone.

Chorus:
We've broken our chains,
We will work without penalty,
We are a sovereign nation.

II
If the enemy kills me too early,
Brave comrade, seize my gun;
And if the ball touches my heart,
All our sisters will stand without fear,
And our mountains, our streams into a rage
Will repel the invader.

Chorus

III
Here begins the Fatherland
Where every human has the same price.
Our only guide is the People.
Our genius is still the People.
It is he alone who decided
To restore its dignity.

Chorus
