= Evangelical Church of Congo =

The Evangelical Church of Congo (Église Evangélique du Congo (EEC)), member of the World Communion of Reformed Churches, is the second largest Christian denomination in the Republic of Congo after the Catholic Church. It has approximately 150,000 members, and is present throughout the country.

== History and structure ==
The Mission Covenant Church of Sweden started mission work in the Belgian Congo in 1909. The Swedish missionaries later joined by missionaries of the Covenant Churches of Norway and Finland. The denomination become independent in 1961 as the Evangelical Church of Congo. It has no creeds. Only adult baptism is practised. The church has seminaries in Ngouedi and Mansimou. The bodies of the government :

- Synod
- Synod Council
- Synod office

The president of the Synod office is the President of the Evangelical Church of Congo. The EEG has congregations, presbyteries and mission field workers.

== Statistics ==
- Presbyteries: 26
- Parishes: 120
- House fellowships: 980
- Evangelists: 287
- Active pastors: 155
