= Pool War =

2016–2017 conflict in the Republic of the Congo

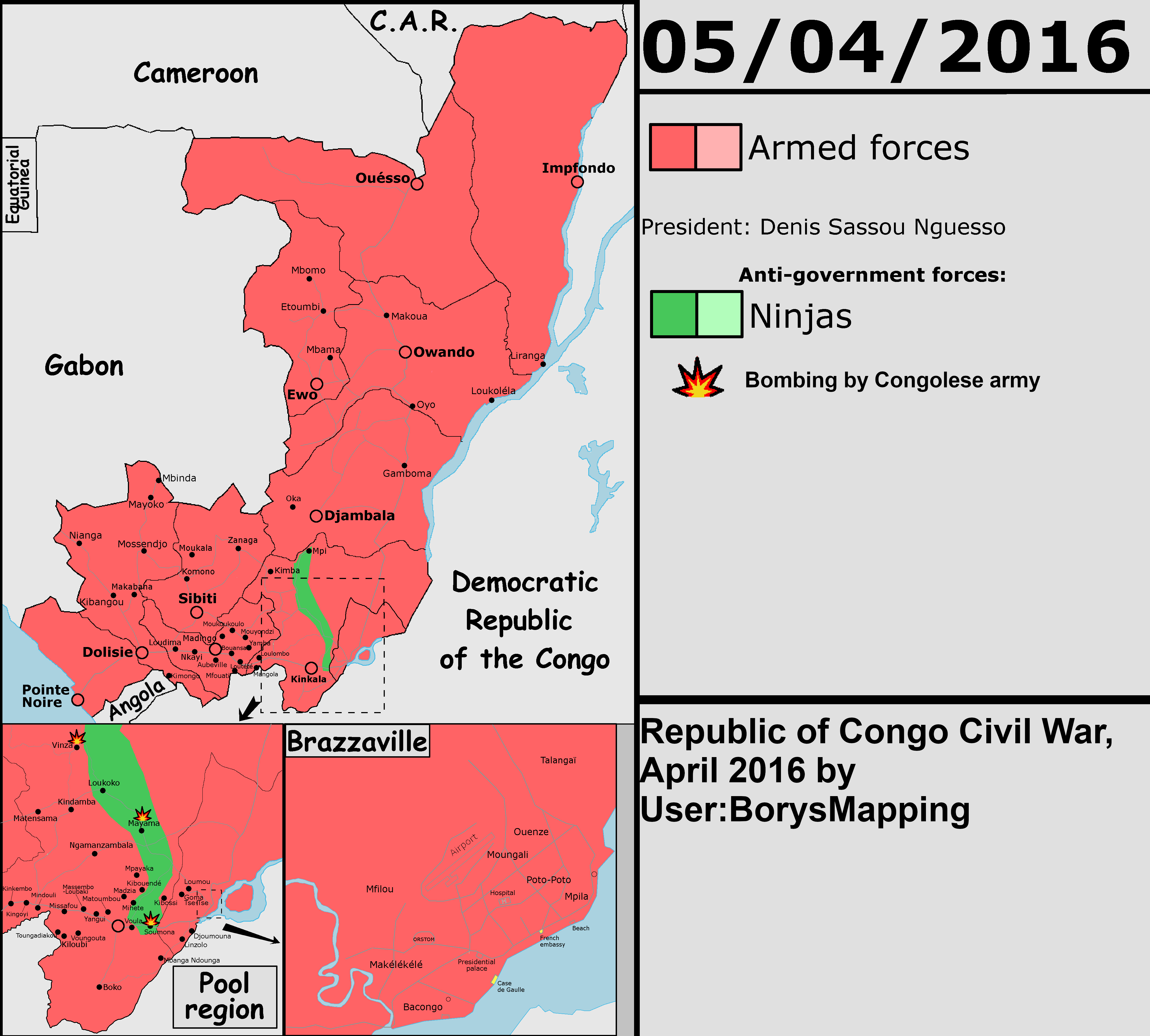
- Areas bombed by the Congolese army on 5 April 2016
Date	4 April 2016 – 23 December 2017 (1 year, 8 months, 2 weeks and 5 days)
Location	Pool Department, Republic of the Congo
Status	Ceasefire

Belligerents
Republic of the Congo	Ninja militia; Nsiloulou

Commanders and leaders
Denis Sassou Nguesso	Frédéric Bintsamou

Units involved
Armed Forces of the Republic of the Congo	

Strength
Unknown number of servicemen	Unknown number of militants

Casualties and losses
- 115 killed in total 13,000 displaced

The Pool War was a conflict that took place from April 2016 to December 2017 in the Pool Department of the Republic of the Congo, between the Congolese government and the Ninja militia.

Tensions between warlord Frédéric Bintsamou (Pastor Ntumi) and Congolese president Denis Sassou Nguesso erupted after Bintsamou contested the 2016 presidential elections, where the previously term-limited Sassou Nguesso was allowed to run again under the new 2015 constitution.

At least 115 people died in the conflict, and an estimated 13,000 people were displaced as a result of the violence.

== Background and start of conflict ==
On October 15, 2015, the Constitution of The Congo was amended in a referendum, which among other new rules for the presidency, allowed presidents to be re-elected for a third term and shortened term limits to five years; the previous 2002 constitution set term limits to 7 years and a maximum of two terms.

Denis Sassou Nguesso, who had ruled the Republic of the Congo in some capacity since 1997 and would’ve been barred from re-election under the 2002 constitution, was allowed to run for his third elected presidential term, which he did in the 2016 presidential election on 20 March. After Nguesso was declared the winner of the election, opposition parties claimed the election was a fraud, and clashes broke out soon after in the southern part of Brazzaville.

== Fighting and ceasefire ==
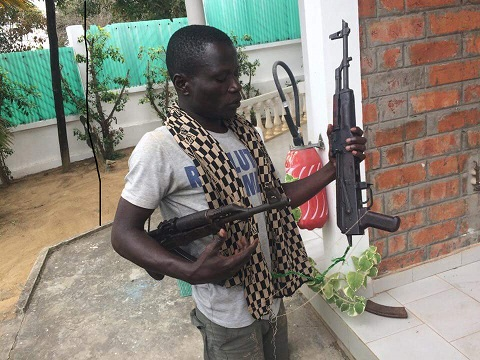
A Ninja colonel handing over his weapons in 2018.

During the post-election clashes, Congolese military, police and local government offices were raided and set alight, killing three police officers and two gunmen. The government claimed that the Ninjas militia was responsible for the attacks. According to a statement from the Congolese government on 22 March, two civilians and 12 assailants were killed. The government also stated that it arrested fifty ex-militants after an attack. Security forces killed around 18 protestors during the clashes.

On 4 April 2016, the Congolese government formally accused the Ninja militia of attacking security forces. Frédéric Bintsamou, the Ninjas’ leader, denied any responsibility in the attacks and called the accusations false pretext for political suppression. Violence would expand and continue, with shelling by the Congolese Armed Forces and attacks on trains by the Ninja militia. On 18 April 2017, 18 Congolese soldiers were killed by Ninja militiamen.

=== Ceasefire ===
The Congolese government and Ninja militia signed a ceasefire agreement on 23 December 2017. Pursuant to the terms of the agreement, the Ninjas were to hand over their arms and cease their interference with trade between the cities of Brazzaville and Pointe Noire.

== Aftermath ==
Many observers accused the Congolese government of coordinating the entire conflict as a false flag to serve as a distraction from the presidential election results, and to intimidate government opposition.

Despite the end of the war in December of 2017, the Congo-Ocean Railway did not resume rail traffic until November of 2018.
