= Mbanza–Ndounga District =

Mbanza–Ndounga
- District
- Interactive map of Mbanza–Ndounga
- Country: Republic of the Congo
- Department: Pool Department

Area
  - Total: 173.7 sq mi (449.9 km^{2})

Population (2023 census)
  - Total: 10,003
  - Density: 57.59/sq mi (22.23/km^{2})
- Time zone: UTC+1 (GMT +1)

Mbanza–Ndounga (can also be written as Mbanza–Ndunga) is a district in the Pool Department of Republic of the Congo.
