= Cobra (militia) =

Former militia in the Republic of the Congo

Cobra Militia
- Leader: Denis Sassou Nguesso
- Founded: Unknown
- Split from: Congolese Party of Labour
- Country: Republic of the Congo
- Active regions: northern Republic of the Congo
- Status: Unknown
- Size: 8,000 (Height)

The Cobra Militia, is also known as Forces Démocratique and Patriotique (FDP), was a militia during the civil war in the Republic of the Congo that fought for Denis Sassou Nguesso. Mostly recruiting from the sparsely populated northern region of the country, the Cobras numbered 8,000 at their height.

== History ==
Founded sometime in 1993 or before, the Cobra militia is a militia loyal to Denis Sassou Nguesso. In 1993 the first civil war broke out. During the war the Cobra militia battled Lissouba's Cocoye Militia killing up to 2,000 people, eventually ending in a peace agreement.

In 1997 the second civil war broke out between the Cobra militia on one side and the Cocoye Militia, Nsiloulou, and its former ally the Ninja militia on the other. With help from Angola, the Cobra militia was able to gain the upper hand and defeat the pro-Lissouba forces.

=== Fall of Brazzaville ===
In Brazzaville, a battle between the pro-Lissouba forces and the cobra militia left much of the capital destroyed, leaving behind burned-out ruins and wrecked armored vehicles. As the pro-Lissouba forces retreated after the fierce battle, the Cobra militia looted hundreds of homes, businesses, and vehicles.

== Human rights violations ==
The Cobra militia has committed numerous human rights violations - they deliberately killed unarmed civilians accused of supporting their enemies, raped, and looted.
