= Makélékélé =

Arrondissement in the Republic of Congo

Coordinates: 4.27796°S 15.20758°E

Makélékélé is one of the arrondissements of Brazzaville, capital of Republic of Congo.
