= Frédéric Bintsamou =

Congolese warlord and religious leader (born 1964)

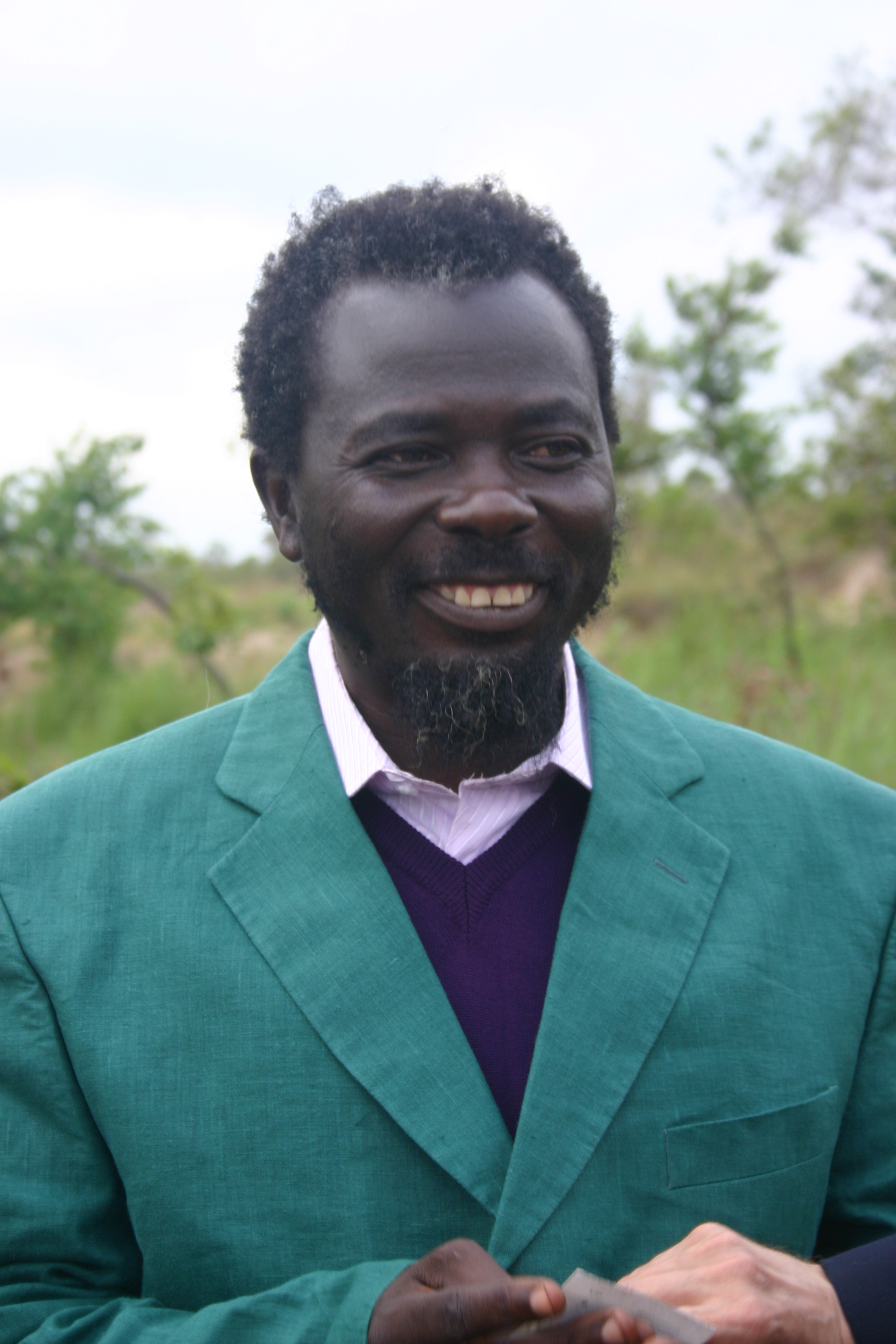
- Bintsamou in 2007
- Born: 29 August 1964 (age 62); Brazzaville, Republic of the Congo
- Military career
- Allegiance: The Ninjas (until 2024)
- Service years: 1990s–2024
- Conflicts: Republic of the Congo Civil War; 2002–2003 conflict in the Pool Department; Pool War
- Other work: Protestant clergyman

Frédéric Ntumi Bintsamou (born 29 August 1964), also known as Pastor Ntumi, is a Congolese Protestant clergyman and former warlord. He was a leader of the "semi-religious" rebel group the Ninjas, which led a civil war in the Republic of the Congo.

== Biography ==
Bintsamou was born on 29 August 1964, in Brazzaville. He began preaching in the early 1990s and cared for mentally ill homeless people in Brazzaville. Following a revelation, he hid in the Pool Department and organized the Ninjas to fight in the Republic of the Congo civil war of 1997–99, during which he gained control over parts of Pool. In 2003, he said a Holy Spirit told him to revive the militia, which he did, commanding them through the 2002–2003 conflict in the Pool Department. The group dissolved—apart from holdouts—in 2006, and Bintsamou hid in Tsoumouna, a settlement 72 kilometers from Brazzaville.

In April 2007, Bintsamou signed a peace agreement with the central government in Brazzaville. Under the agreement, Bintsamou was to disband his militia in exchange for a position as a deputy minister responsible for peace and reparations.

Bintsamou was eventually installed in his official post as Delegate-General for the Promotion of the Values of Peace and Repair of the Ravages of War on 28 December 2009. Standing as a candidate of the Conseil National des Républicains (CNR) political party, Bintsamou was elected as a local councilor in Mayama, located in the Pool Department, in the September 2014 local elections.

In 2016, the Pool War began, which Bintsamou commanded in. On 30 September, he led the Ninjas in a train attack, which caused 14 deaths. A ceasefire was signed on 23 December 2017, and on 13 August 2024, he signed a ceasefire in which the Ninjas forfeited their arsenal. As a result, an arrest warrant for Bintsamou was lifted.
