= Republic of the Congo Civil War (1993–1994) =

Ethno-political conflict in the Republic of the Congo

First Republic of the Congo Civil War
Date	Initial unrest: 8 June 1993 – 4 August 1993 (1 month and 27 days); Civil war: 2 November 1993 – 30 January 1994 (2 months and 28 days)
Location	Republic of the Congo
Result	Peace agreement

Belligerents
(Republic of the Congo) Republic of the Congo; Cocoye Militia	Cobra Militia; Ninja Militia

Commanders and leaders
(Republic of the Congo) Pascal Lissouba	(Republic of the Congo) Bernard Kolélas (Republic of the Congo) Denis Sassou Nguesso

Casualties and losses
- 2,000 people killed 50,000 displaced

The First Republic of the Congo Civil War, also known as the First Brazzaville-Congolese Civil War, was a conflict in the Republic of the Congo which lasted from 2 November 1993 to 30 January 1994 and was between rival militias led by former politician Bernard Kolelas, former Prime Minister Pascal Lissouba, and former President Denis Sassou-Nguesso. It was one of four instances of militia fighting within the country, setting the stage for the next three conflicts in 1997, 1998–99, and 2002. The war was a direct result of unresolved claims of election fraud in the 1992 presidential election. The First Congo Civil War and the decade of conflict that followed resulted in the deaths of over 12,000 people and the displacement of 860,000 more.

== History of government in Congo-Brazzaville ==
=== Post-independence ===
Shortly after gaining independence in 1964, the Republic of the Congo (Congo-Brazzaville) experienced a "period of great instability," in which the military and executive branches of its one-party state came into conflict several times. Some resolution came in the form of Colonel Denis Sassou-Nguesso, an autocratic ruler who took power in 1979 and oversaw a decade of economic growth centered around the oil industry and reparations to relations with France, the former colonial power of Congo-Brazzaville. While he maintained stability by offering positions in the government to elites all around the country, he also turned the country into a "neopatrimonial rentier state," redistributing oil money to allies and prospective supporters of his regime in exchange for education and employment.

=== 1992 elections and the push for democracy ===
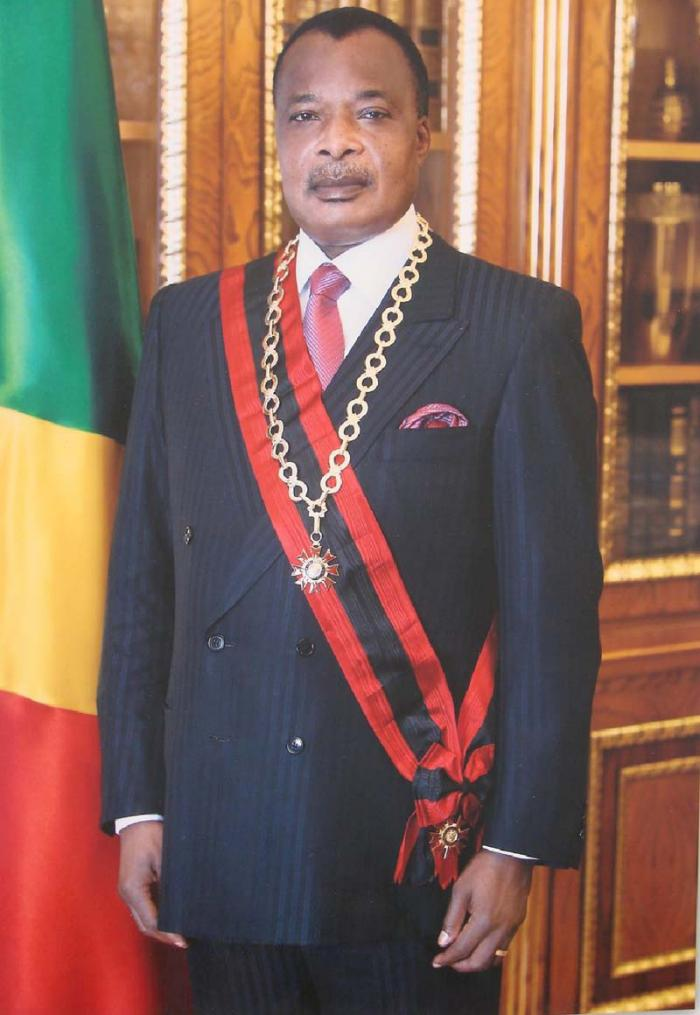
Denis Sassou-Nguesso, former President of Congo-Brazzaville

Following an international push for democratization in Francophone countries, President Sassou-Nguesso resigned in 1992. However, instead of being an opportunity to shape a lasting democracy, the 1992 elections were largely seen as a chance to take control of the country's oil reserves. Sassou-Nguesso ran in the election to be the head of the new government against Pascal Lissouba, a former prime minister, and Bernard Kolelas, a former politician. Lissouba won the election due to the fact that his home in the south had the most demographic weight.

=== Government under Lissouba ===
Lissouba initially ruled a coalition government in partnership with Sassou-Nguesso, who had a strong base but not enough numerical support to win the initial election. However, when Lissouba refused to adopt Sassou's rentier state model of government, Sassou left the coalition. Lissouba did not give any of Sassou's followers prominent positions in the cabinet, which deprived Sassou of access to "key sources of oil rents and patronage." Without Sassou's aid, Lissouba struggled to maintain control and established a private security force to keep himself secure in power. The situation quickly devolved as Kolelas saw the creation of a militia as an act of aggression and created one of his own, drawing from youths from his own geographic background and deepening ethnic divisions within the government. In 1992, Lissouba responded to Sassou's defection, which deprived him of most of his parliamentary power, by dissolving the parliament itself. Sassou called for a new election in 1993, hoping to win by an overwhelming margin to solidify his power. Instead, Lissouba won forty-nine seats, and Kolelas and Sassou-Nguesso together won sixty-two. Kolelas decided to boycott the second round of voting and urged his supporters to do the same, inciting them and members of his militia to civil disobedience and violence with claims of fraud.

== Militia fighting ==
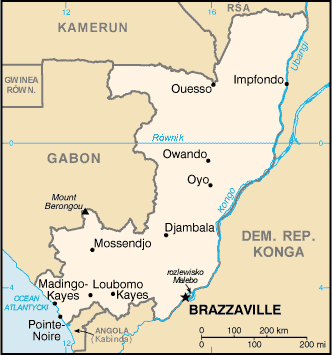
Map of Congo-Brazzaville with major cities labeled

Starting on 8 June 1993, the militias would clash repeatedly, often taking out hostility on local townships rather than their military opposition. Sassou-Nguesso's Cobras and Kolelas' Ninjas generally allied against Lissouba's Cocoyes, but the violence was complex and the alliances not very strict. President Lissouba declared a state of emergency on 16 July 1993. Ethnic divisions played a role in the conflict, which often took the form of rape and violence towards civilians. Both during and after the elections, Lissouba and Kolelas masked their lack of ideological political differences by playing up the role of ethnicity and regional origin in the election. Both attempted to employ "ethnic chauvinism", by using existing ethnic division to gather support and deepening the disconnect in the process. The official figures claim that in the roughly six months of fighting, 2,000 people were killed, 100–300,000 were displaced, and 13,000 houses were destroyed. The fighting was suspended on 29 July 1993 with a ceasefire and Gabonese President Omar Bongo and Mohamed Sahnoun of Algeria, special representative of the Organization of African Unity (OAU), mediated negotiations between the parties in Libreville, Gabon. The Libreville Accord were agreed and signed on 4 August 1993 to arbitrate the disputed seats in parliament and attempt to resolve the conflict for good by establishing more specific election procedures. President Lissouba lifted the state of emergency on 15 August 1993.

== Effects of the war ==
=== Immediate impact ===
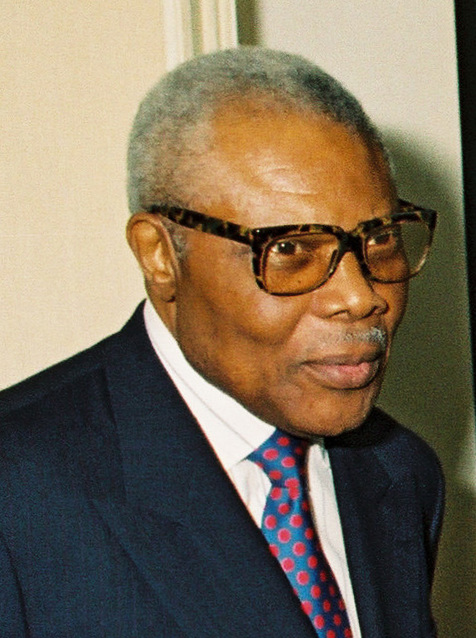
Pascal Lissouba, former Prime Minister of Congo-Brazzaville

Outside the immediate and tragic loss of life, property, and freedom, the decade of fighting that began with the First Civil War has had drastic effects on every part of society in the Republic of the Congo, especially for those who already lived near or below the poverty line. In 2005, "two thirds of Congolese live[d] below the poverty line," while less than 30% lived under that threshold before 1993. Primary and secondary school attendance dropped by 30% to 51% over the span of those ten years, and the gender education gap only grew. The economy, largely centered around oil wealth that was managed by the state, fluctuated wildly as the state was destabilized.

=== Effects today ===
Sassou-Nguesso is still serving as the president today, having reemerged as the preeminent leader of the nation in 1997. Sassou is currently in his controversial third term following a 2015 referendum on whether to amend the constitution to allow him to run again despite being over 70 and having already served two full terms. He won the referendum with 92% of the votes, prompting questions into his history and the potential fraud of the elections. Tens of thousands gathered to protest the referendum in the nation's capital, and his personal security killed four protesters. In response, the Ninja militia, still active from the 1992 conflict, clashed with security forces. At least a hundred were killed and thousands more forced to flee. Despite the controversy, Sassou-Nguesso went on to win that election and the next, securing over 36 total years in power. Several African think tanks and security studies suggest that "many Congolese are resigned" to the fact that Sassou-Nguesso will be reelected. He has jailed his only two serious competitors for office, one of whom - Kolelas - ran against him in 1992 as well. The specter of the 1992 civil war continues to haunt the nation, with major implications for voter suppression and continued violence.

== Relevant groups ==
=== Union Pan-Africaine pour la Democratie Sociale (UPADS). ===
UPADS was Lissouba's party, which were the primary supporters of the Presidential Coalition, briefly also supported by Sassou. The primary militias of UPADS and the Presidential Coalition were the Cocoyes and the Ministerial Guard.

=== Parti Congolais du Travail (PCT) ===
The PCT was Sassou's party, supported directly by the Cobra militia. Interestingly, Lissouba's distrust of the army may not have been unbased. Still led by mostly Northerners and mostly Sassou appointees, the army didn't get involved until the following conflicts several years later, refusing to support Lissouba and following Sassou's pattern of inaction in the direct conflict.

=== Mouvement congolais pour la démocratie et le développement intégral (MCDDI) ===
The MCDDI was Kolelas' party, supported by the Ninja militia. Again, the militia was largely made up of members of the Bakongo ethnic group, of which Kolelas himself was a part.

== See also ==
- Republic of the Congo Civil War (1997–1999)
