= Ninja (militia) =

Militia in the Republic of the Congo

Ninjas
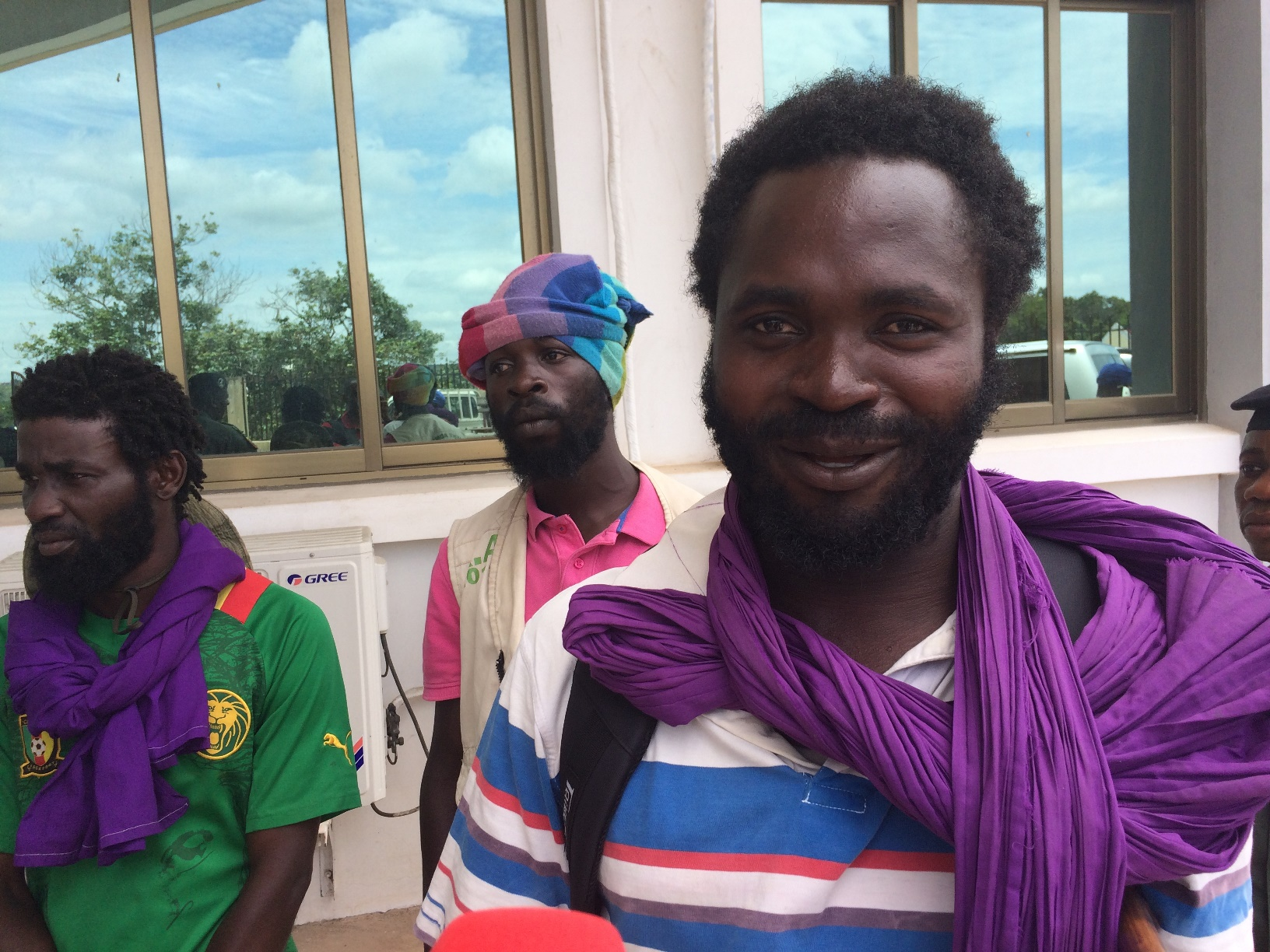
- Former Ninja fighters in 2019
- Leaders: Bernard Kolélas; Frédéric Bintsangou a.k.a. Pastor Ntoumi
- Dates active: Early 1990s–2008; 2016–2017
- Headquarters: Brazzaville (until 1997); Pool Department
- Active regions: Republic of the Congo
- Size: Estimates of some hundred active; up to 3,000 loosely attached fighters as of 2002
- Wars: the Pool War

The Ninjas were a militia in the Republic of the Congo, which participated in numerous wars and insurgencies in the 1990s and 2000s. The Ninjas were formed by the politician Bernard Kolélas in the early 1990s and were commanded by Frédéric Bintsamou, alias Pastor Ntoumi, when Kolélas was in exile.

The militia fought the supporters of President Pascal Lissouba in the 1993–94 Civil War. In the 1997–99 Civil War, they allied with Lissouba's forces against the supporters of former President Denis Sassou Nguesso. After Sassou Nguesso's victory in this Civil War, Ntoumi's Ninjas fought an insurgency against his government in the Pool Department. The conflict in the Pool escalated in a series of violent clashes in 2002-03, after which the Ninja leadership eventually gave up their armed struggle. Ntoumi announced the disbanding of the Ninjas in 2008 but they resurfaced in 2016, starting the Pool War.

== Character and ideology ==
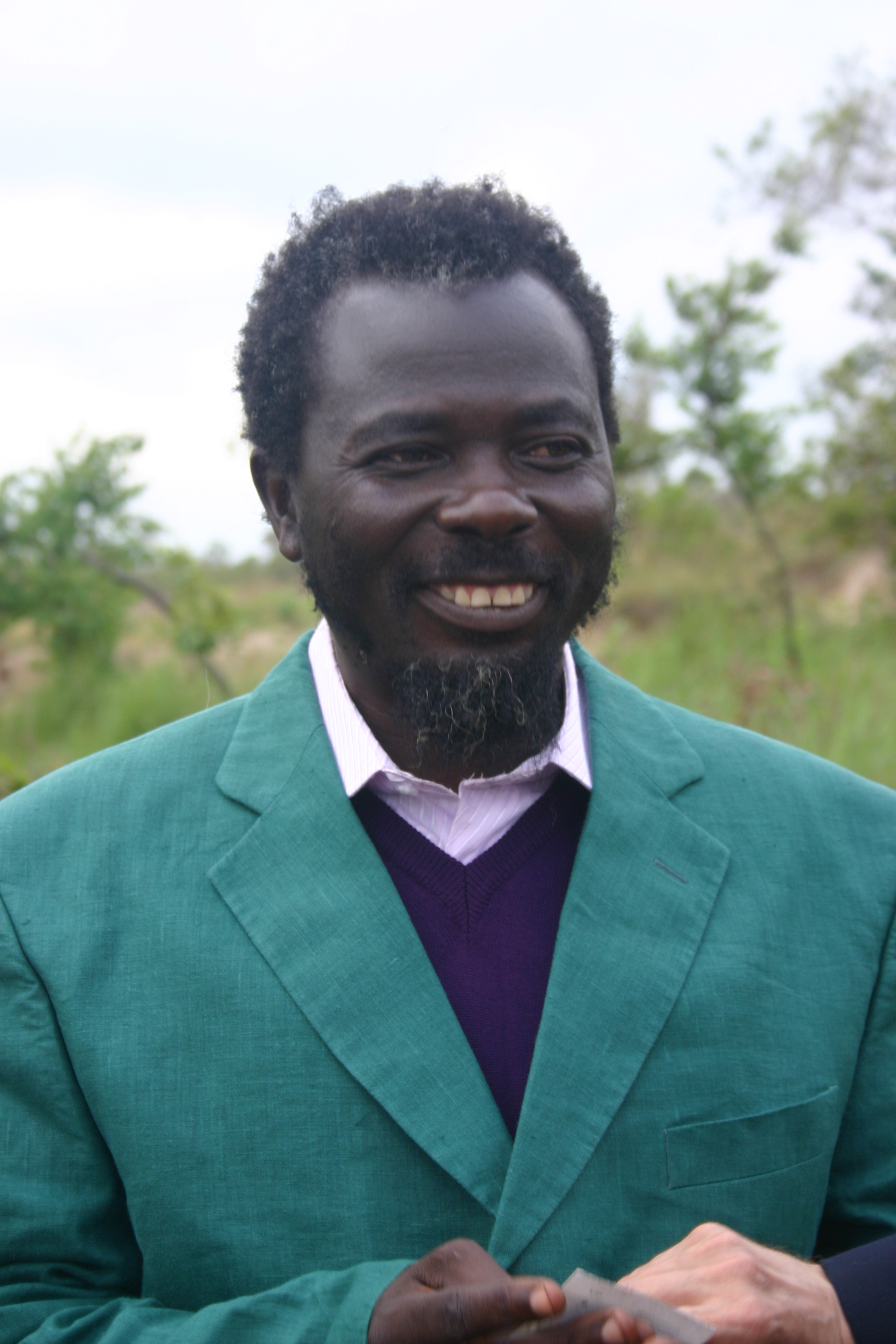
Frederick Bintsamou, also known as Pastor Ntoumi

Formed by and originally loyal to Bernard Kolélas, the Ninja militia was associated with the Bakongo ethnic group. The militia was named after the ninjas of feudal Japan. The Ninja field commander, Pastor Ntoumi, has been described as a cult leader and a "messianic pastor". In 2003, he told a journalist that the Holy Spirit told him to revive the Ninjas. Ninja militiamen wore the colour purple (symbolizing suffering), and had their hair in dreadlocks. They were reported to believe that the apocalypse was near. A Ninja leader quoted in a 2000 report claimed that there were "almost 16,000 Ninjas in the Pool region". According to a 2002 news report by IRIN News, analysts believed Ntoumi commanded "only a few hundred dedicated fighters and up to 3,000 more loosely attached", the latter of which were divided and unenthusiastic.

== History ==
=== 1990s: Foundation and Civil War ===
The Republic of the Congo, formerly the People's Republic of the Congo (1970–1991), abolished its Marxist-Leninist one-party system in 1991. In the new multi-party state, rivaling political leaders formed their own militias. Denis Sassou Nguesso, President for much of the one-party era, formed the Cobra militia. Pascal Lissouba, elected President from 1992, formed the Ministerial Guard, or Cocoye militia, and the Zulu militia. Bernard Kolélas, leader of the Mouvement Congolais pour la Démocratie et la Développement Integral (MCDDI) party, formed the Ninjas, recruiting from his party. After the disputed 1993 elections, violent conflict between the militias began. In this conflict, which lasted until 1994, the Ninjas were allied with Sassou Nguesso's Cobras against Lissouba's Cocoyes. In December 1995, the parties in the conflict signed a peace treaty where they agreed that militiamen aged 18–24 would be integrated into the national gendarmerie and police force. UNESCO also launched a plan to disarm the militias. These programs to pacify the country were controversial and unsuccessful, and the militias survived. In peacetime, the morale among the Ninjas suffered due to lack of payments.

The Republic of the Congo Civil War began in June 1997, when the supporters of President Lissouba (including the Army and the Cocoye, Zulu, and Mamba militias) clashed with those of Denis Sassou Nguesso (including the Cobra militia and Sassou Nguesso's sympathizers in the army). Kolélas, then Mayor of Brazzaville, was initially neutral. The Ninja-controlled districts of Brazzaville, Bacongo and Makélékélé therefore suffered far less casualties than the rest of the city during the first months of the war. In September, Kolélas sided with Lissouba, and was installed as Prime Minister. The Ninjas thus entered the war on Lissouba's side. The alliance between the Ninjas and Lissouba's Cocoyes was formalized with the founding of the Mouvement National pour la Liberation du Congo (MNLC), but Ninja leaders such as Claude-Ernest Ndalla and Willy Matsanga opposed the alliance and defected with their men to Sassou Nguesso's side.

Sassou Nguesso's forces, supported by Angola, took control of Brazzaville in October 1997, and overthrew Lissouba's government. Sassou Nguesso returned to the presidency. The Ninjas retreated to the Pool Department and fought an insurgency against the new government. In 1999, leaders of the Ninjas and Cocoyes signed a ceasefire agreement. Following the ceasefire and defeats against government forces, about 2000 Ninjas and Cocoyes surrendered to the government. The ceasefire agreement was condemned by Kolélas. By 1999, American sources speculated if Kolélas and Lissouba were no longer in control of their militias.

=== 2000s: Pool insurgency ===
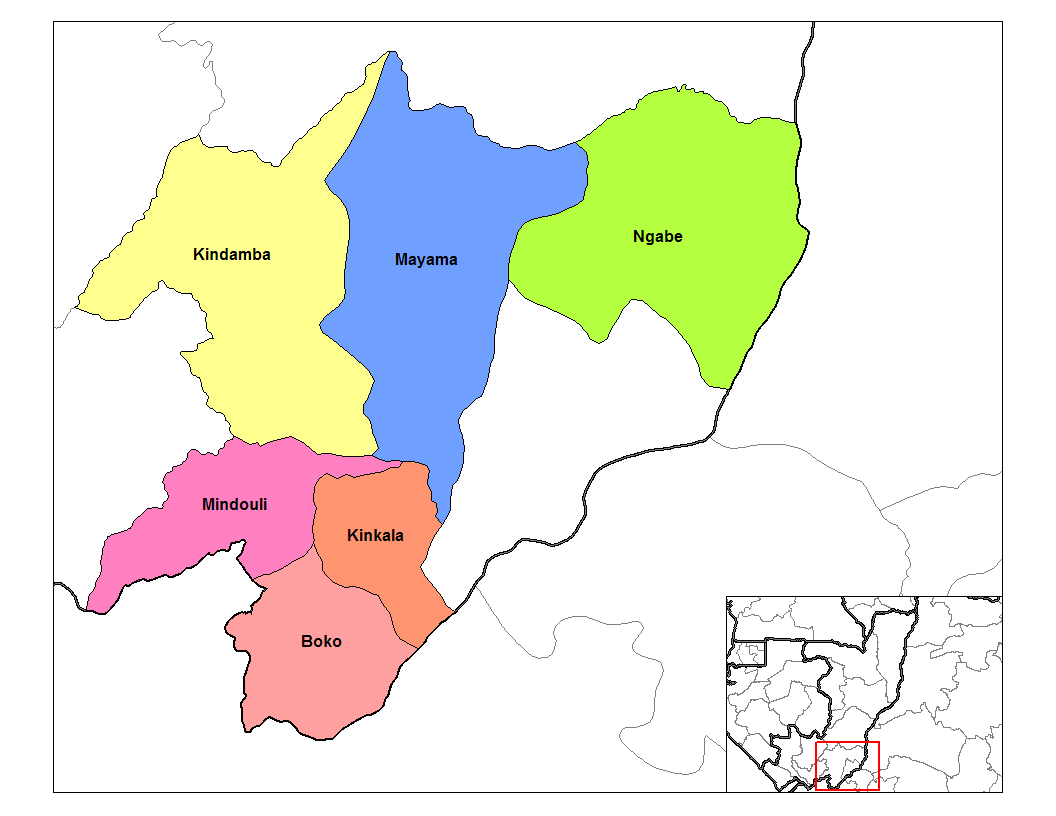
Map showing districts of Pool as well as Pool's location within the Republic of the Congo

There were several major clashes between government forces and Ninjas in 2002 and 2003, resulting in large humanitarian casualties. In March 2003, Ninja leaders signed agreements with the government to cease hostilities in Pool. Despite the peace accords, many Ninja militiamen remained active, and engaged in robberies of civilians and train hijackings. As of 2009, active Ninja remnants still exist in the southern Pool.

In June 2007, Ntoumi announced that the Ninjas were "going into constructive opposition" and were determined "to work for peace in Pool and across the country". Ninja members led by Ntoumi burned around 100 of their weapons in a ceremony in Kinkala. On June 10, 2008, the National Programme of Demobilisation, Disarmament and Reintegration (NPDDR), aiming to reintegrate ex-combatants from the wars of the 1990s and 2000s into civilian society, was launched. Ntoumi spoke at the launching in Kinkala and announced the disbanding of the Ninjas. He was offered a government post in September 2007, but remained in hiding until December 2009, when he went to Brazzaville to take up the post.

Bernard Kolélas died in Paris in 2009.

=== 2010s: Pool war ===
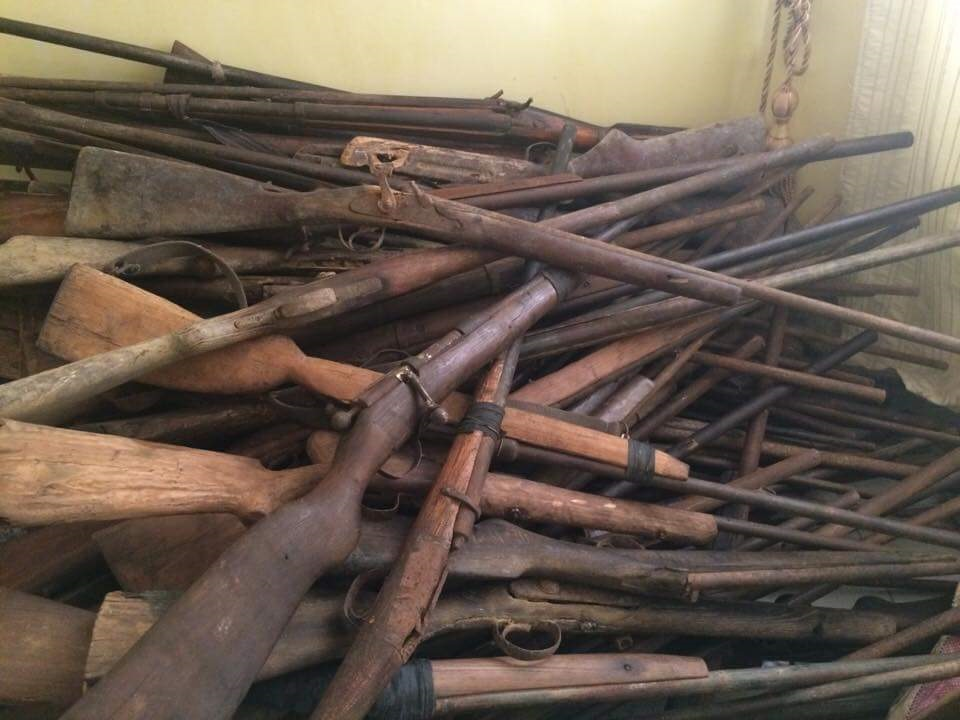
Rifles handed over by the Ninjas in 2019

In 2016, Bintsamou again raised his forces after contested modifications of the constitution by president Sassou-Nguesso. On 4 April 2016, the Congolese government accused the Ninja militia of attacking security forces. The militia denied the accusations, calling them false pretext for political suppression. Violence continued with events such as shelling by the Congolese armed forces and attacks on trains by the Ninja militia. The Congolese government and the Ninja militia signed a ceasefire agreement on 23 December 2017. Pursuant to the terms of the agreement, the Ninjas were to hand over their arms and cease their interference with trade between the cities of Brazzaville and Pointe Noire.

== Human rights violations ==
According to a 2000 report by USCIS there were "numerous credible reports of grave human-rights violations committed by Ninja militia forces ... including hostage-taking, torture and extrajudicial executions." An Amnesty International report cited by USCIS stated that "[f]rom June 1997, Ninja and Cocoye combatants reportedly killed hundreds and possibly thousands of unarmed civilians at roadblocks in their Bacongo and Makélékélé strongholds."

== See also ==
- Cobra (militia)
- Cocoye Militia
- Nsiloulou
