= Pool Department =

Department of the Republic of the Congo

Coordinates: 3°34′S 14°46′E

Pool Mpumbu, Nsundi or Mbula Ntangu
- Department
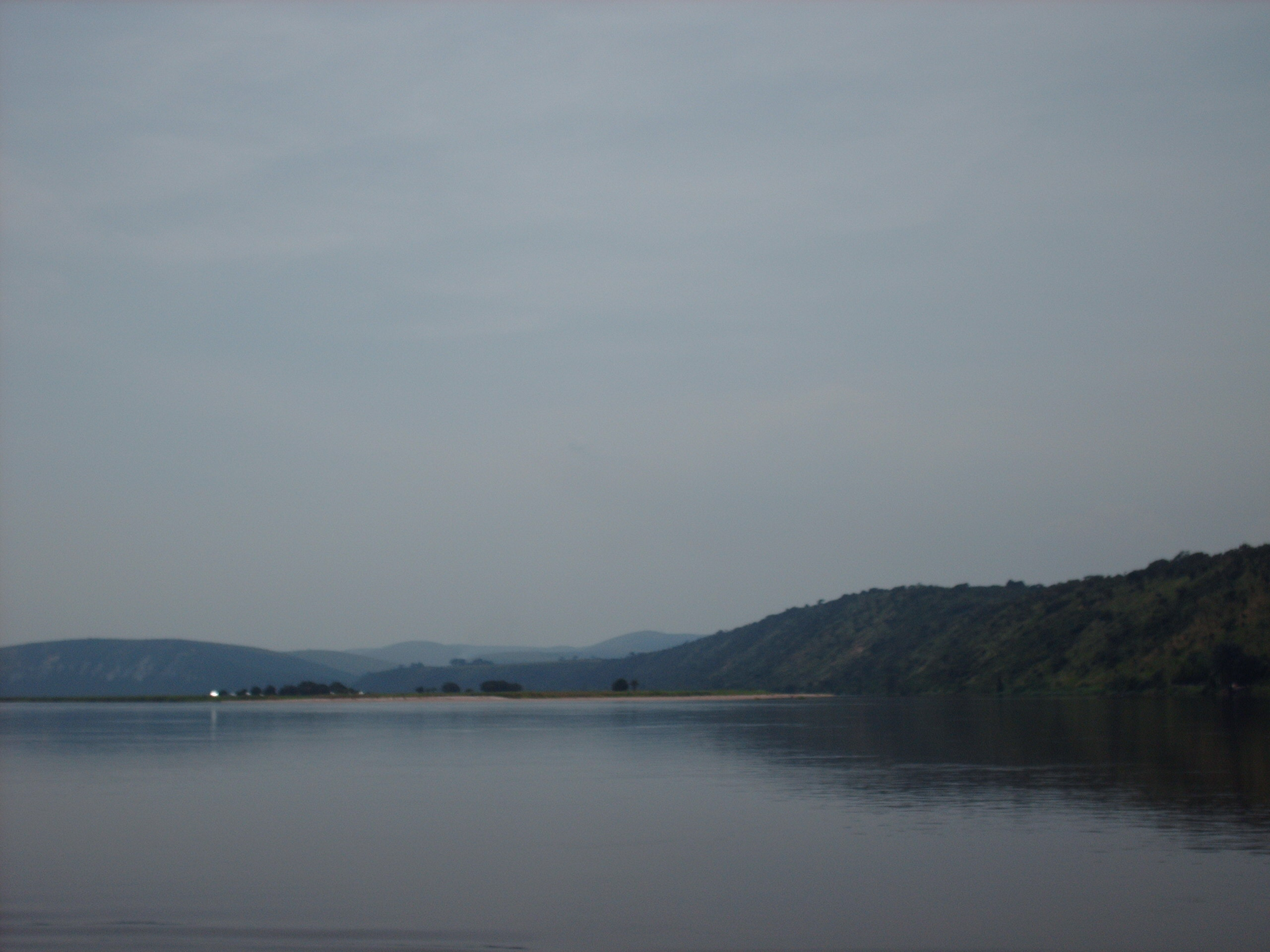

- Pool, department of the Republic of the Congo
- Country: Republic of the Congo
- Capital: Kinkala

Area
  - Total: 33,955 km^{2} (13,110 sq mi)

Population (2023 census)
  - Total: 394,532
  - Density: 11.619/km^{2} (30.094/sq mi)
- HDI (2018): 0.484 low · 12th of 12

Pool (Kongo: Mpumbu, Nsundi, Mbula Ntangu) is a department of the Republic of the Congo in the southeastern part of the country. It borders the departments of Bouenza, Lékoumou, and Plateaux. Internationally, it borders the Democratic Republic of the Congo. It also surrounds the commune district of the national capital, Brazzaville.

The regional capital is Kinkala. Main towns include Boko, Kindamba and Mindouli. In the early 2000s, the Pool region was the home of a low-level insurgency led by Pasteur Ntumi. The inhabitants of this department are the Kongo, the Téké and the Native population (Pygmies).

The region is named after the Pool Malebo (formerly Stanley Pool), a particularly wide stretch of the Congo River.

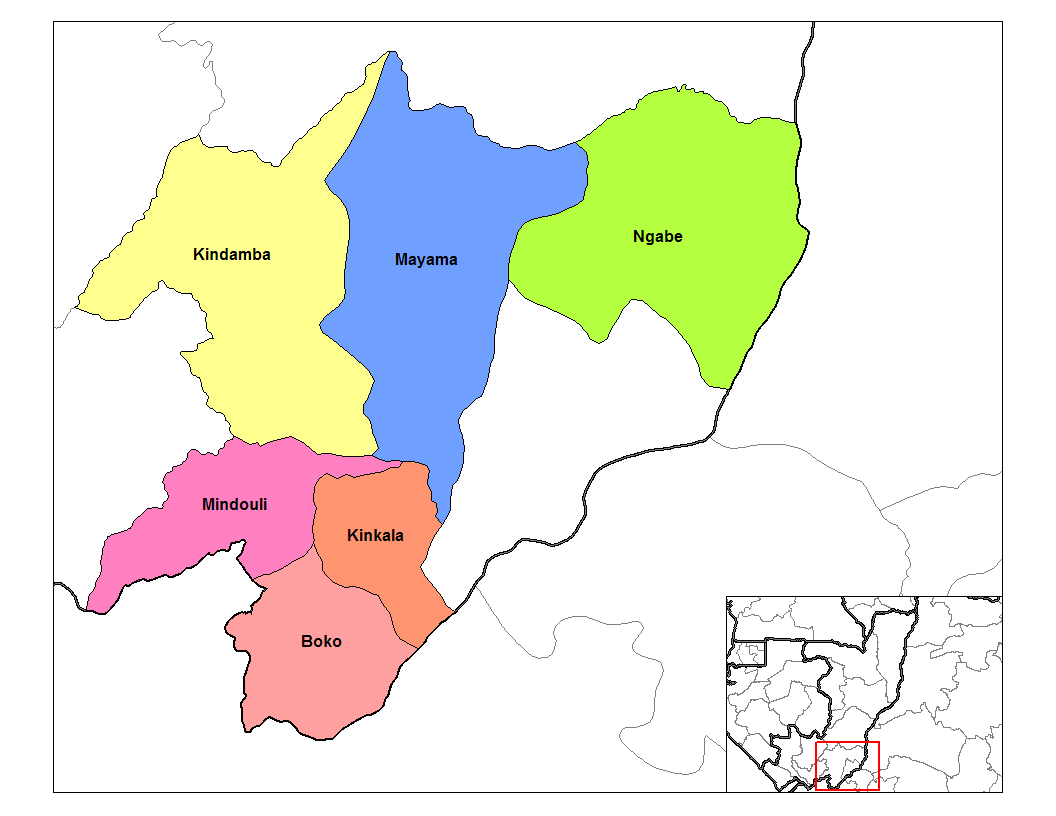
Districts of Pool

== Administrative divisions ==
Pool Department is divided into thirteen districts:

1. Kinkala District
2. Boko District
3. Mindouli District
4. Kindamba District
5. Goma Tsé-Tsé District
6. Mayama District
7. Ngabé District
8. Mbanza–Ndounga District
9. Louingui District
10. Loumo District
11. Ignié District
12. Vindza District
13. Kimba District
