= Episcopal Conference of the Congo =

Assembly of Catholic bishops in central Africa

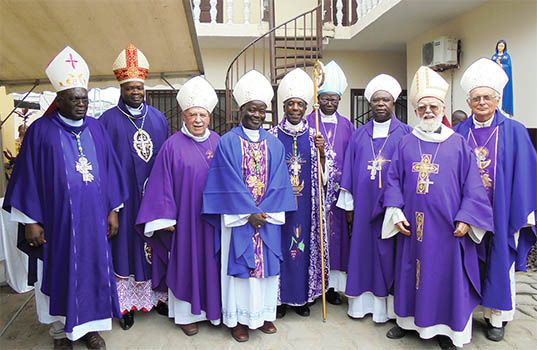
CEC Evéques du Congo lors de la 51° conférence

The Episcopal Conference of the Congo (French: Conférence Épiscopale du Congo, CEC) is the episcopal conference of the Catholic Church in the Republic of the Congo. The CEC is a member of the Association of Episcopal Conferences of the Region of Central Africa and the Symposium of Episcopal Conferences of Africa and Madagascar (SECAM).

The conference elects its president to a three-year term.

List of presidents of the Bishops' Conference:

- 1970–1971: Théophile Mbemba, Archbishop of Brazzaville
- 1971–1977: Emile Biayenda, Archbishop of Brazzaville
- 1981–1986: Georges-Firmin Singha, Bishop of Owando
- 1986–1993: Barthélémy Batantu, Archbishop of Brazzaville
- 1993–1997: Bernard Nsayi, Bishop of Nkayi
- 1997–2003: Anatole Milandou, Archbishop of Brazzaville
- 2003–2006: Ernest Kombo, Bishop of Owando
- 2006–2015: Louis Portella Mbuyu, Bishop of Kinkala
- 2015–present: Daniel Mizonzo, Bishop of Nkayi
