= List of Catholic dioceses in the Republic of the Congo =

The Roman Catholic Church in the Republic of the Congo consists of 3 ecclesiastical province comprising 6 suffragan dioceses.

== List of dioceses ==
=== Episcopal Conference of the Republic of the Congo ===
==== Ecclesiastical Province of Brazzaville ====
- Archdiocese of Brazzaville
  - Diocese of Gamboma
  - Diocese of Kinkala

==== Ecclesiastical Province of Owando ====
- Archdiocese of Owando
  - Diocese of Impfondo
  - Diocese of Ouesso

==== Ecclesiastical Province of Pointe-Noire ====
- Archdiocese of Pointe-Noire
  - Diocese of Dolisie
  - Diocese of Nkayi
