= Louis Portella Mbuyu =

Congolese catholic priest

Mgr. Louis Portella Mbuyu
- Bishop emeritus of Kinkala, Republic of Congo
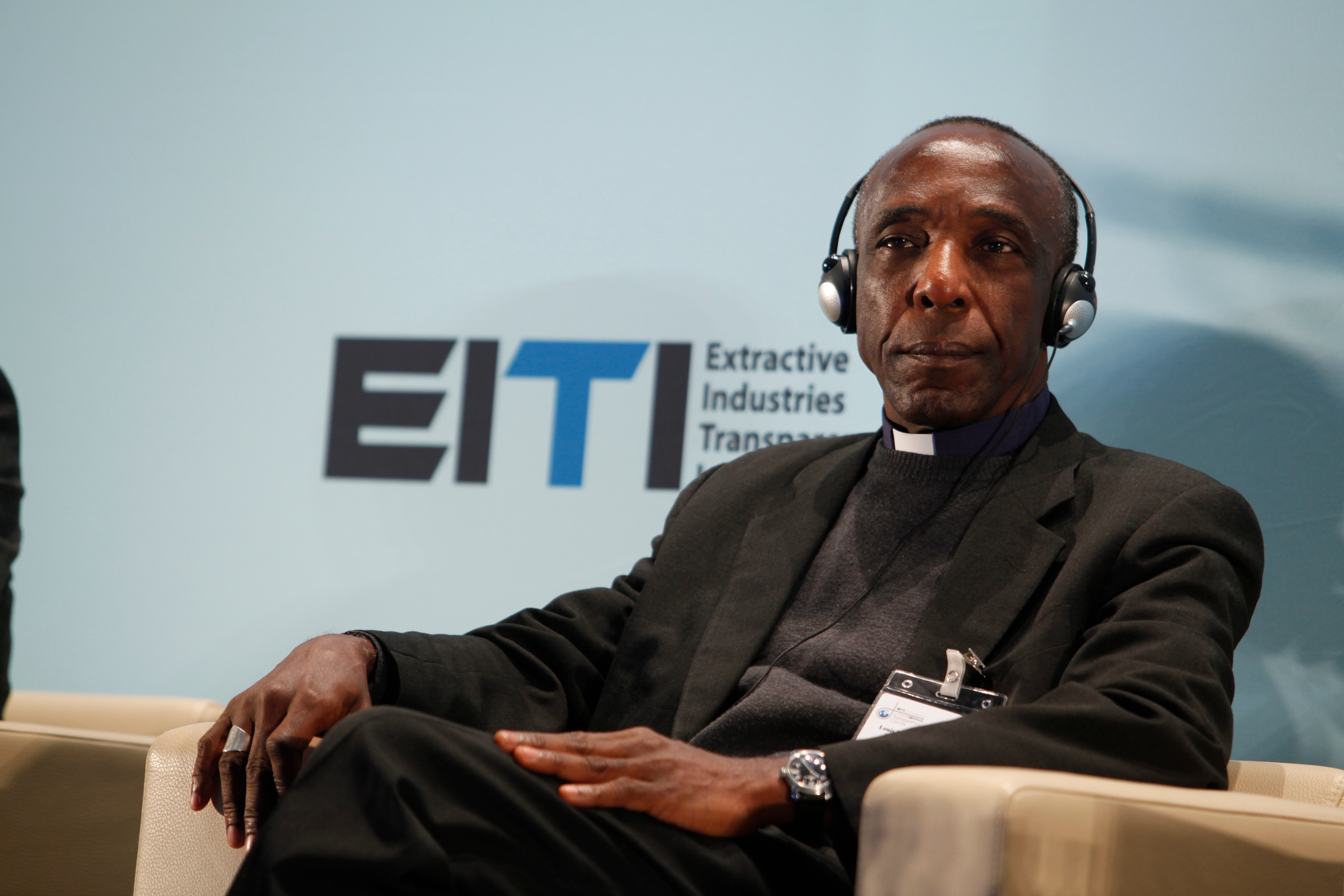
- Church: Catholic
- Appointed: 16 October 2001
- Installed: 6 January 2002
- Term ended: 5 March 2020
- Predecessor: Anatole Milandou
- Successor: Ildevert Mathurin Mouanga

Orders
- Ordination: 31 December 1967
- Consecration: 6 January 2002 by Pope John Paul II

Personal details
- Born: 28 July 1942 (age 84) Pointe-Noire, French Congo, ´French Equatorial Africa
- Denomination: Catholic
- Motto: Ite Ad Joseph (Go to Joseph)

Louis Portella Mbuyu (born 28 July 1942) is the Catholic Bishop emeritus of Kinkala, in Republic of Congo.

Louis Portella Mbuyu was born on 28 July 1942 at Pointe-Noire, Pointe-Noire diocese, in the Kouilou Department. He was ordained in 1967 Pointe-Noire. He attended the Pontifical Gregorian University in Rome, earning an MA in Spiritual Theology and to Paris where he studied sociology.

Portella Mbuyu was a teacher and spiritual director at the Emile Biayenda Major Seminary, before to be appointed Rector of this institution.

On 16 October 2001 Pope John Paul II appointed him Bishop of Kinkala, effective 6 January 2002, replacing Anatole Milandou .

In May 2006 he was elected President of the Episcopal Conference of the Congo holding this position until 25 April 2015.

His retirement was accepted 5 March 2020.
