= François Halyday Mbouangui =

Congolese Catholic prelate (born 1977)

The Most Reverend François Halyday Mbouangui
- Coadjutor Bishop of Nkayi, Republic of the Congo
- Church: Catholic Church
- Archdiocese: Archdiocese of Pointe-Noire
- See: Diocese of Nkayi
- Appointed: 1 December 2025
- Installed: 15 February 2026

Orders
- Ordination: 14 July 2007
- Consecration: 15 February 2026
- Rank: Bishop

Personal details
- Born: François Halyday Mbouangui; 4 October 1977 (age 48) Mindouli, Diocese of Kinkala, Pool Department, Republic of the Congo
- Motto: "Confide surge vocate te" (Trust rise call yourself)

Styles of François Halyday Mbouangui
- Reference style: Your Lordship; The Most Reverend
- Spoken style: His Lordship
- Religious style: Bishop

François Halyday Mbouangui (born 4 October 1977) is a Congolese Catholic prelate who serves as the Bishop of the Roman Catholic Diocese of Nkayi, in the Republic of the Congo since 1 June 2026. Prior to that, he was Coadjutor Bishop of the same Catholic See from December 2025 until 1 December 2026. Before that, from 14 July 2007 until 1 December 2025, he was a priest of the same Catholic dioceese. Pope Leo XIV appointed him bishop in December 2025. His episcopal consecration took place on 15 February 2026.

== Background and education ==
He was born on 4 October 1977, in Mindouli, Diocese of Kinkala, Pool Department, in the Republic of the Congo. He studied philosophy at the Monsignor Firmin Singha National Major Seminary in Brazzaville. He then studied theology at the Pontifical Urban University in Rome, Italy. He holds a licentiate in "science of communication" and a master's degree in publishing and journalism, both from the University of Verona.

== Priesthood ==
He was ordained a priest for the Diocese of Nkayi on 14 July 2007. He served as a priest until 1 December 2025. While a priest, he served in several roles and locations, including:

- Personal secretary to the bishop of Nkayi Diocese.
- Chancellor of the diocese of Nkayi.
- Head of youth pastoral care from 2007 until 2009.
- Cooperator at the parish of Saint-Louis in Nkayi from 2007 until 2009.
- Parish vicar of San Rocco, Pedemonte, Italy from 2009 until 2013.
- Parish vicar of Santa Maria Assunta, Manerba del Garda, Italy from 2013 until 2023.
- Studies in Italy at the University of Verona, leading to the award of a licentiate in science of communication and a master's degree in publishing and journalism from 2009 until 2023.
- Director of the diocesan Social Communication Centre from 2023 until 2025.
- Member of the Council for Economic Affairs from 2023 until 2025.
- Parish vicar of Saint-Michel in Madingou-Poste, Republic of the Congo from 2023 until 2025.

== As bishop ==
On 1 December 2025, Pope Leo XIV appointed him Coadjutor bishop of the Diocese of Nkayi. He is expected to work with Bishop Daniel Mizonzo, the local ordinary in administering that Catholic See. He has the right of succession at Nkayi, when that position falls vacant in the future. His ordination took place on 15 February 2026. The Principal Consecrator was Fortunatus Nwachukwu, Titular Archbishop of Aquaviva assisted by Daniel Mizonzo, Bishop of Nkayi and Abel Liluala, Archbishop of Pointe-Noire. On 1 June 2026, The Holy Father accepted the resignation request of Bishop Daniel Mizonzo from the pastoral care of the Diocese of Nkayi, in the Republic of the Congo. He was succeeded by Bishop François Halyday Mbouangui, previously the Coadjutor Bishop of that diocese.

== See also ==
- Catholic Church in the Republic of the Congo

== Succession table ==
Catholic Church titles
Preceded by Daniel Mizonzo (16 October 2001- 1 June 2026)	Bishop of Nkayi (since 1 June 2026 December 2025)	Succeeded by (Incumbent)
Preceded by -	Coadjutor Bishop of Nkayi (1 December 2025 - 1 June 2026)	Succeeded by -
