= Brice Armand Ibombo =

Congolese Catholic prelate (born 1973

The Most Reverend Brice Armand Ibombo
- Bishop of Ouesso, Republic of the Congo
- Church: Catholic Church
- Archdiocese: Roman Catholic Archdiocese of Owando
- See: Diocese of Ouesso
- Appointed: 28 May 2025
- Installed: 19 July 2025
- Predecessor: Gélase Armel Kema
- Successor: Incumbent

Orders
- Ordination: 28 August 2004
- Consecration: 19 July 2025 by Javier Herrera Corona
- Rank: Bishop

Personal details
- Born: Brice Armand Ibombo; 23 November 1973 (age 52) Abala, Archdiocese of Owando, Republic of the Congo

Styles of Brice Armand Ibombo
- Reference style: Your Lordship; The Most Reverend
- Spoken style: His Lordship
- Religious style: Bishop

Brice Armand Ibombo (born 23 November 1973) is a Congolese Catholic prelate who serves as the bishop of the Roman Catholic Diocese of Ouesso, in the Republic of the Congo. He was appointed to that position on 28 May 2025 and was installed at Ouesso on 19 July 2025. Before that, from 22 February 2013 until 28 May 2025, he was a priest of the Diocese of Gamboma in Congo-Brazzaville. He previously served as a priest of the Archdiocese of Owando, Congo-Brazzaville from 28 August 2004 until 22 February 2013.

== Background and education ==
He was born on 23 November 1973 in Abala, Archdiocese of Owando, Republic of the Congo. He studied philosophy at the Monsignor Georges-Firmin Singha Philosophical Major Seminary in Brazzaville, Republic of the Congo. He then studied theology at the Concordia-Pordenone Major Seminary in Rome, Italy. He holds a Doctorate degree in Church history, awarded by the Pontifical Gregorian University.

== Priest ==
He was ordained a priest for the Archdiocese of Owando on 28 August 2004. On 22 February 2013, the day the Diocese of Gamboma was erected, he was incardinated into the new diocese. He served as a priest until 28 May 2025. While a priest, he served in various roles and locations, including:

- Parish vicar of the Cathedral of Santo Stefano Protomartire of Concordia Sagittaria in Italy from 2004 until 2010.
- Parish administrator of Santa Maria degli Angelii in Caraffa del Bianco in Italy from 2010 until 2013.
- Secretary of the Episcopal Conference of the Congo from 2013 until 2023.
- Parish cooperator in Notre-Dame des Victoires of Ouenzé from 2014 until 2015.
- Lecturer in the Department of History of Marien Ngouabi University, Brazzaville from 2014 until 2025.
- Member of the College of Consultors of the diocese of Gamboma from 2019 until 2025.
- Vice Rector of the Emile Cardinal Biayenda National Theological Major Seminary in Brazzaville from 2024 until 2025.

== Bishop ==
On 28 May 2025, Pope Leo XIV appointed him bishop of the Diocese of Ouesso, in the Republic of the Congo. He succeeded Bishop Gélase Armel Kema who served there as local ordinary from 8 December 2021 until 6 January 2024, when he was appointed Archbishop of Owando. Bishop Ibombo was consecrated and installed at Ouesso on 19 July 2025 by the hands of Javier Herrera Corona, Titular Archbishop of Vulturaria assisted by Gélase Armel Kema, Archbishop of Owando and Daniel Franck Nzika, Bishop of Impfondo.

== See also ==
- Catholic Church in the Republic of the Congo

== Succession table ==
Catholic Church titles
| Preceded by Gélase Armel Kema (8 December 2021 - 6 January 2024) | Bishop of Ouesso (since 28 May 2025) | Succeeded by Incumbent |
