= Matswanism =

Matswanism (French: matswanisme, French: matsuanisme or French: matsouanisme) is a political association that was founded in French Congo by André Matswa in the 1920s and evolved into a religious/political movement after the death of Matswa in 1942.

== Background ==
Under the colonial regimes in the Belgian Congo and the French Congo, religious movements in support of Congolese nationalism arose very early around Pool Malebo. The authorities in Belgian Congo faced the messianism of Simon Kimbangu from 1921. They condemned him to death, but King Albert I commuted his sentence to life imprisonment and he died in prison in 1951. After Kimbangu's arrest, his family and followers officially established the Kimbanguist church which became a member of the World Council of Churches. Claiming to be a disciple of Kimbangu, Simon Pierre M'padi fled the Belgian Congo for the French Congo. There he founded the Kakist movement in 1939. M'padi was condemned in August 1949 in Mindouli and handed over to the Belgian authorities.

However, the most powerful of these Congolese religious movements was Matswanism, founded by André Matswa "Grenard", an old tirailleur sergeant and public service accountant in the department of Seine. He created the Amicale des Originaires de l'A.E.F., a mutual aid society for people from French Equatorial Africa in 1926 and, on his return to Africa he more or less openly criticised the colonial regime during a meeting with his followers. He was arrested in 1929 and deported to French Chad the following year. He died in April 1942 in the prison at Mayama.

After his death, in 1942, the Matswanists presented Matswa as a prophet and continued to resist. The colonial administration never managed to break this resistance movement. At the end of the 1950s, the ever-more intense conflict between the Matswanists and the colonial authorities had become entangled with the process of political transition which led, in 1960, to independence.

— Meike de Goede, "Objectivation, aphasie coloniale et histoire de la déportation des matsouanistes de Brazzaville (1959)", Les Temps Modernes 2017/2-3 (n° 693-694), pp. 195–220

After independence, Congolese politicians of many ideological shades attempted to capitalize on Matsoua's popularity, including Presidents Abbé Fulbert Youlou, Alphonse Massamba-Débat and Denis Sassou-Nguesso, as well as the insurgent leader Bernard Kolélas. There is a statue honoring him in Kinkala.

== Bibliography ==
- Martial Sinda, Le messianisme congolais et ses incidences politiques depuis son apparition jusqu'à l'époque de l'indépendance, 1921-1961, Paris, 1961, Doctoral thesis.
- Martial Sinda, Le messianisme congolais et ses incidences politiques, Paris, Payot, 1972, 390p.
- Martial Sinda, André Matsoua, fondateur du mouvement de libération du Congo, Paris-Dakar-Abidjan, ABC-Nea, 1978
- Martial Sinda, Simon Kimbangu, prophète et martyr zaïrois, Paris-Dakar-Abidjan, ABC-Nea, 1978
- Abel Kouvouama, André Grenard Matsoua, l'autre Simon Kimbangu^{[usurped]}
- Jean-Pierre Bat, Décolonisation et politique française au Congo-Brazzaville (1958-1963) (Doctoral thesis, École Nationale des Chartes, Sorbonne, 2006).

== See also ==
- Simon Kimbangu,
- Kimbanguism
- Balalism
