= List of football stadiums in the Republic of the Congo =

The following is a list of football stadiums in the Republic of the Congo, ordered by capacity. Currently stadiums with a capacity of 5,000 or more are included, most stadiums in the Republic of the Congo are dedicated for football (soccer), with some also used for other sports as well as other Cultural events.

== Current stadiums ==
#	Images	Stadium	Capacity	City	RF
1		Stade Municipal de Kintélé	60,000	Brazzaville	
2		Stade Alphonse Massemba-Débat	33,037	Brazzaville	
3		Stade Omnisport Marien Ngouabi	13,037	Owando	
4		Stade Municipal Pointe-Noire	13,000	Pointe-Noire	
5		Stade Omnisports de Kinkala	12,000	Kinkala	
6		Stade de Sibiti	7,000	Sibiti	
7		Stade Denis Sassou Nguesso	5,000	Dolisie	
8		Stade Marchand	5,000	Brazzaville	

== See also ==
- Lists of stadiums
- List of association football stadiums by capacity
- List of African stadiums by capacity
- Football in the Republic of the Congo
