= Archdiocese of Owando =

Roman Catholic archdiocese in the Republic of the Congo

Coordinates: 0.4809°S 15.9020°E

Archdiocese of Owando Archidioecesis Ouandoensis

Location
- Country: Republic of the Congo

Statistics
- Area: 75,850 km^{2} (29,290 sq mi)
- Population: Total; Catholics: (as of 2020); 488,140; 355,120 (72.7%)
- Parishes: 27

Information
- Denomination: Roman Catholic
- Sui iuris church: Latin Church
- Rite: Roman Rite
- Established: 21 December 1950 (Vicariate Apostolic of Fort-Rousset); 14 September 1955 (Diocese of Fort-Rousset); 3 December 1977 (Diocese of Owando); 30 May 2020 (Archdiocese of Owando)
- Cathedral: Cathedral of Christ the King
- Secular priests: 53

Current leadership
- Pope: Leo XIV
- Archbishop: Gélase Armel Kema

Website
- archdioceseowando.org

The Roman Catholic Archdiocese of Owando is a jurisdiction of the Catholic Church in the Republic of Congo. On February 11, 2011, Pope Benedict XVI appointed Bishop Victor Abagna Mossa as Bishop of Owando.

On May 30, 2020, the Diocese of Owando was raised to Archdiocese, and Bishop Victor Abagna Mossa was elevated to Archbishop.

== History ==
- December 21, 1950: Established as Apostolic Vicariate of Fort-Rousset
- September 14, 1955: Promoted as Diocese of Fort-Rousset
- December 3, 1977: Renamed as Diocese of Owando
- May 30, 2020: Elevated to Archdiocese of Owando

As of 2020, the Archdiocese was preparing to twin with the Diocese of Saint-Denis (Seine-Saint-Denis). This came after a visit from Mgr Pascal Delannoy to the new Archdiocese of Owando in July 2020.

== Bishops ==
=== Vicars Apostolic of Fort-Rousset ===
1. Emile-Elie Verhille, C.S.Sp. (1951-1955), title changed to Bishop of Fort-Rousset

=== Bishops of Fort-Rousset ===
1. Emile-Elie Verhille, C.S.Sp. (1955-1968)
2. Georges Benoit Gassongo (Apostolic Administrator 1968-1970)

=== Bishops of Owando ===
1. Georges-Firmin Singha (1972-1988), appointed Bishop of Pointe-Noire
2. Ernest Kombo, S.J. (1990-2008)
3. Louis Portella Mbuyu (Apostolic Administrator 2008-2011)
4. Victor Abagna Mossa (2011-2020), elevated to Archbishop

=== Archbishops of Owando ===
1. Victor Abagna Mossa (2020-2023)
2. Gélase Armel Kema, C.S.Sp. (2024-)

=== Former Auxiliary Bishops ===
- Georges Benoit Gassongo (1965-1981)

== Suffragan Dioceses ==
- Impfondo
- Ouesso

== See also ==
- Roman Catholicism in the Republic of the Congo

== Sources ==
- GCatholic - Metropolitan Archdiocese of Owando
- Catholic Hierarchy - Archdiocese of Owando
- Roman Catholic Archdiocese of Owando Official Site
