= Archdiocese of Pointe-Noire =

Roman Catholic archdiocese in the Republic of the Congo

Coordinates: 4.8000°S 11.8500°E

Archdiocese of Pointe-Noire Archidioecesis Nigrirostrensis

Location
- Country: Republic of the Congo

Statistics
- Area: 13,500 km^{2} (5,200 sq mi)
- Population: Total; Catholics: (as of 2004); 2,000,000; 1,000,000 (50.0%)

Information
- Denomination: Roman Catholic
- Rite: Latin Rite
- Cathedral: St. Peter the Apostle Cathedral, Pointe-Noire

Current leadership
- Pope: Leo XIV
- Archbishop: Abel Liluala

The Roman Catholic Archdiocese of Pointe-Noire (Latin: Nigrirostren(sis)) is an archdiocese located in the city of Pointe-Noire in the Republic of the Congo. This province has suffragan dioceses Dolisie and Nkayi.

== Background ==
Formerly included in the Kingdom of Congo, the Kingdom of Loango became independent towards the end of the sixteenth century, at which time it extended from the mouth of the Kwilou to that of the River Congo. By the treaties of 1885 all this country, over which Portugal had till then exercised a somewhat uncertain sway, became part of French Congo, except the enclave of Cabinda which still remained under Portuguese control.

== History ==
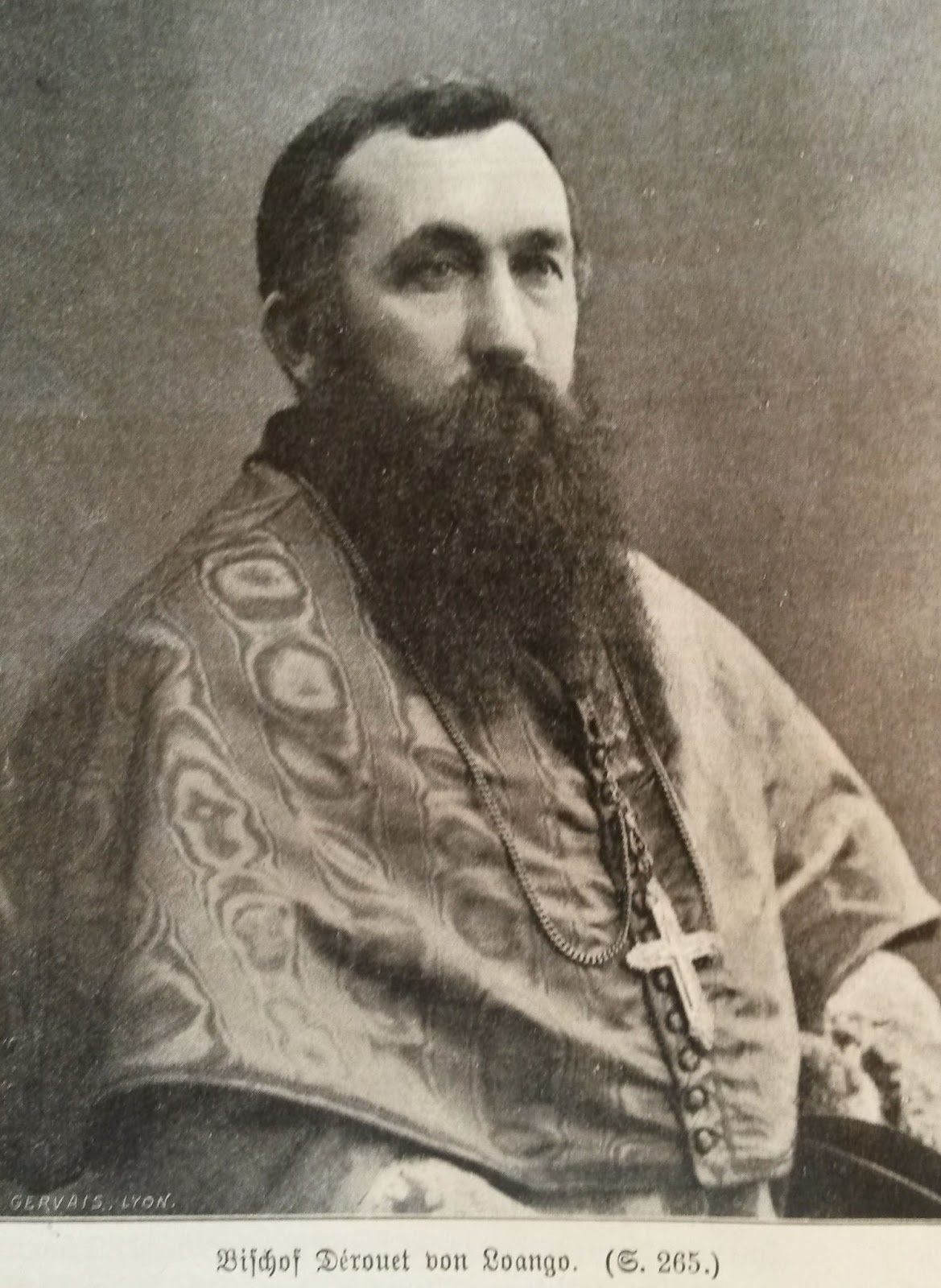
Jean Derouet as pro-Vicar Apostolic of Loango, French Congo

The transference of civil dominion affected the ecclesiastical distribution of the territory. By decree of 24 November 1886, the Vicariate Apostolic of French Congo was detached from that of Gaboon; and as a result of further division, on 14 October 1890 the Apostolic Vicariate of Lower French Congo was established from the Apostolic Vicariate of French Congo. The three vicariates which made up French Congo — Gaboon, Loango, Ubangi — embraced an area, approximately, of one million square miles.

The Vicariate Apostolic of Loango lay to the south of that of Gaboon; on the west, it was bounded by the Atlantic; on the south, by the Massabi River, Cabinda, and Belgian Congo; to the east is the Vicariate of Ubangi, from which it is separated by the Djue River as far as the upper reaches of that river, and thence onward by a line drawn to meet the head waters of the Alima River.

The people speak a number of Bantu languages, the most important of which is the Kivili. Amongst those who contributed to the knowledge of the language were Msgr Carrie, the first Apostolic vicar, and his successor, Msgr Jean Louis Joseph Derouet. In April 1907 it was renamed the Apostolic Vicariate of Loango.

The vicariate was served by the Congregation of the Holy Ghost. The station at Loango was on the route to Brazzaville, and had a printing establishment. The seminary and house of novices were at Mayumba, where Ignace Stoffel founded the mission in 1888.

Jean Derouet was of the Congregation of the Holy Ghost and of the Immaculate Heart of Mary, and titular bishop of Camachus. He was born at Saint-Denis-de-Villenette, Diocese of Séez, Orne, France, 31 January 1866. Ordained in 1891, he went as missionary to the Congo, and in 1904 was named pro-Vicar Apostolic of Loango. He was chosen bishop on 19 December 1906; consecrated 3 February 1907, in the chapel of the Holy Ghost, at Paris; preconized on 18 April of the same year; and appointed Vicar Apostolic of Lower French Congo.

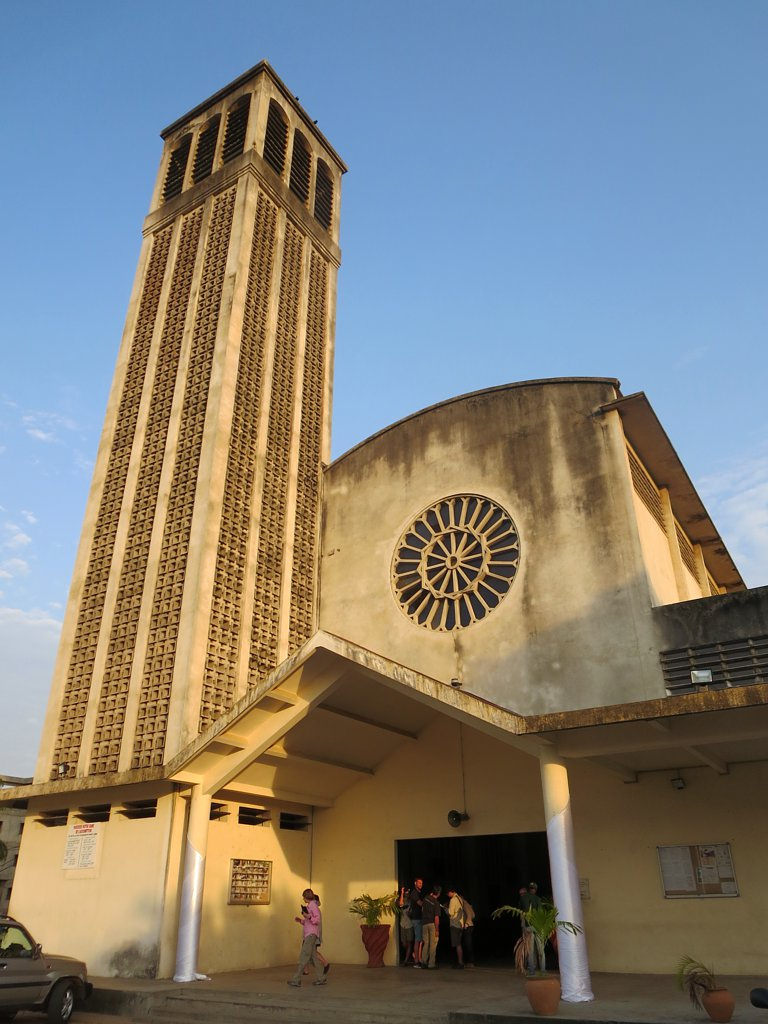
Church of Notre Dame de l'Assomption in Pointe-Noire

In January 1949 it was renamed the Apostolic Vicariate of Pointe-Noire. The official seat of the archdiocese is the Cathédrale Saint-Pierre-Apôtre de Pointe-Noire, although the Church of Notre Dame de l'Assomption, erected in 1953, often served as a de facto cathedral. The vicariate became the Diocese of Pointe-Noire. In 2011 Bishop Jean-Claude Makaya Loembe was relieved of pastoral charge of the diocese due to concerns of mismanagement.

In May 2020 the diocese was raised to the Archdiocese of Pointe-Noire. Orthodox Metropolitan Panteleimon of Brazzaville and Gabon, congratulate Archbishop Miguel Olaverri on the promotion of Diocese of Pointe-Noire to Archdioceseand presented him with an engolpion.

== Leadership, in reverse chronological order ==
- Archbishops of Pointe-Noire (Roman rite),
  - Archbishop Abel Liluala (6 January 2024 – present)
  - Archbishop Miguel Angel Olaverri Arroniz, SDB (30 May 2020 – 6 January 2024)
- Bishops of Pointe-Noire (Roman rite), below
  - Bishop Miguel Angel Olaverri Arroniz, SDB (22 February 2013 – 30 May 2020)
  - Bishop Jean-Claude Makaya Loembe (19 December 1994 – 31 March 2011)
  - Bishop Georges-Firmin Singha (1 September 1988 – 18 August 1993)
  - Bishop Godefroy-Emile Mpwati (5 June 1975 – 1 September 1988)
  - Bishop Jean-Baptiste Fauret, C.S.Sp. (14 September 1955 – 5 June 1975);
- Vicar Apostolic of Pointe-Noire (Roman rite), below
  - Bishop Jean-Baptiste Fauret, C.S.Sp. (13 February 1947 – 14 September 1955);
- Vicars Apostolic of Loango (Roman rite), below
  - Bishop Henri Friteau, C.S.Sp. (22 March 1922 – 4 April 1946)
  - Bishop Léon-Charles-Joseph Girod, C.S.Sp. (13 January 1915 – 13 December 1919)
  - Bishop Jean Louis Joseph Derouet, C.S.Sp. (2 January 1907 – 4 March 1914)
- Vicar Apostolic of Lower French Congo (Roman rite), below
  - Bishop Antoine-Marie-Hippolyte Carrie, C.S.Sp. (14 October 1890 – November 1903)

== Suffragan dioceses ==
- Dolisie
- Nkayi

== See also ==
- Roman Catholicism in the Republic of the Congo

== Sources ==
- GCatholic.org
- Catholic Hierarchy
