= Arróniz (surname) =

Arróniz is a Spanish surname. Notable people with the surname include:

- Alfredo Arróniz (1902–1976), Spanish footballer
- Miguel Angel Olaverri Arroniz (born 1948), Spanish prelate and Roman Catholic Archbishop of Pointe-Noire
- Teresa Arróniz y Bosch (1827–1890) was a Spanish writer
