= Martial Sinda =

Congolese poet and politician (1935–2025)

Member of the Senate of the Republic of the Congo
- In office 19 July 1992 – 2 May 1993

Personal details
- Born: 1935; Kinkala District, French Congo, French Equatorial Africa
- Died: 16 July 2025 (aged 89–90)
- Political party: MCDDI
- Education: University of Paris
- Occupation: Poet

Martial Sinda (1935 – 16 July 2025) was a Congolese poet and politician of the Congolese Movement for Democracy and Integral Development (MCDDI).

== Life and career ==
Born in Kinkala District in 1935, Sinda completed a writing apprenticeship under Jean Malonga. He won the Grand Prix littéraire de l'Afrique Equatoriale française in 1956, which caused a scandal and was saved from expulsion from French Equatorial Africa by Léopold Sédar Senghor and Paul Chauvet. In 1961, he defended a thesis at the University of Paris on Kimbanguism titled "Le messianisme congolais et ses incidences politiques depuis son apparition jusqu'à l'époque de l'indépendance, 1921-1961". In 1972, he published Le Messianisme congolais et ses incidences politiques, kimbanguisme, matsouanisme, autres mouvements, which won him the Prix Georges-Bruel of the Académie des sciences d'outre-mer. In 1992, he was elected to the Senate for the MCDDI. In August 2011, he received an honorary doctorate from the Université Simon-Kimbangu in Kinshasa.

Martial Sinda died on 16 July 2025.

== Publications ==
- Premier chant du départ (1955)
- Le Messianisme congolais et ses incidences politiques, kimbanguisme, matsouanisme, autres mouvements (1972)
- André Matsoua : fondateur du mouvement de libération du Congo (1977)
- Simon Kimbangu : prophète et martyr zaïrois (1977)
- "L'État africain postcolonial : les forces sociales et les communautés religieuses dans l'État postcolonial en Afrique" (Présence Africaine, 1983)
