= Bernard Nsayi =

Congolese theologian (1943–2021)

- Bishop of Nkayi
- Church: Catholic Church
- Diocese: Diocese of Nkayi
- In office: 7 July 1990 – 16 October 2001
- Predecessor: Ernest Kombo
- Successor: Daniel Mizonzo

Orders
- Ordination: 17 June 1971
- Consecration: 16 September 1990 by Beniamino Stella

Personal details
- Born: 27 June 1943 Mindouli, French Equatorial Africa, French Empire
- Died: 12 February 2021 (aged 77) Rome, Italy

Bernard Nsayi (27 June 1943 in Mindouli – 12 February 2021 in Rome) was the Roman Catholic bishop of the Roman Catholic Diocese of Nkayi, Republic of the Congo.

Nsayi was ordained to the priesthood in 1971. He served as bishop of the Diocese of Nkayi from 1990 to 2001. He died in 2021.
