= Religion in Congo =

Religion in Congo may refer to the following:

- Religion in the Democratic Republic of the Congo
- Religion in the Republic of the Congo
