= Hervé Itoua =

- Bishop Emeritus of Ouesso
- Church: Catholic Church
- Diocese: Diocese of Ouesso
- In office: 6 June 1983 – 22 April 2006
- Predecessor: Diocese erected
- Successor: Yves Marie Monot

Orders
- Ordination: 12 July 1970
- Consecration: 28 August 1983 by Roger Etchegaray

Personal details
- Born: 1942 (age 83–84) French Equatorial Africa, French Empire

Hervé Itoua (born 1942) is the former bishop of the Roman Catholic Diocese of Ouesso.

== Biography ==
Hervé Itoua was born in 1942 in Otambioko, Republic of the Congo. He was ordained a priest on July 12, 1970. On June 6, 1983 he was appointed the first bishop of Ouesso. He was consecrated bishop on August 28, 1983. On April 22, 2006 he resigned as bishop, and was succeeded by Yves Marie Monot.
