= André Matsoua =

Congolese Lari anti-colonial activist

André Matswa
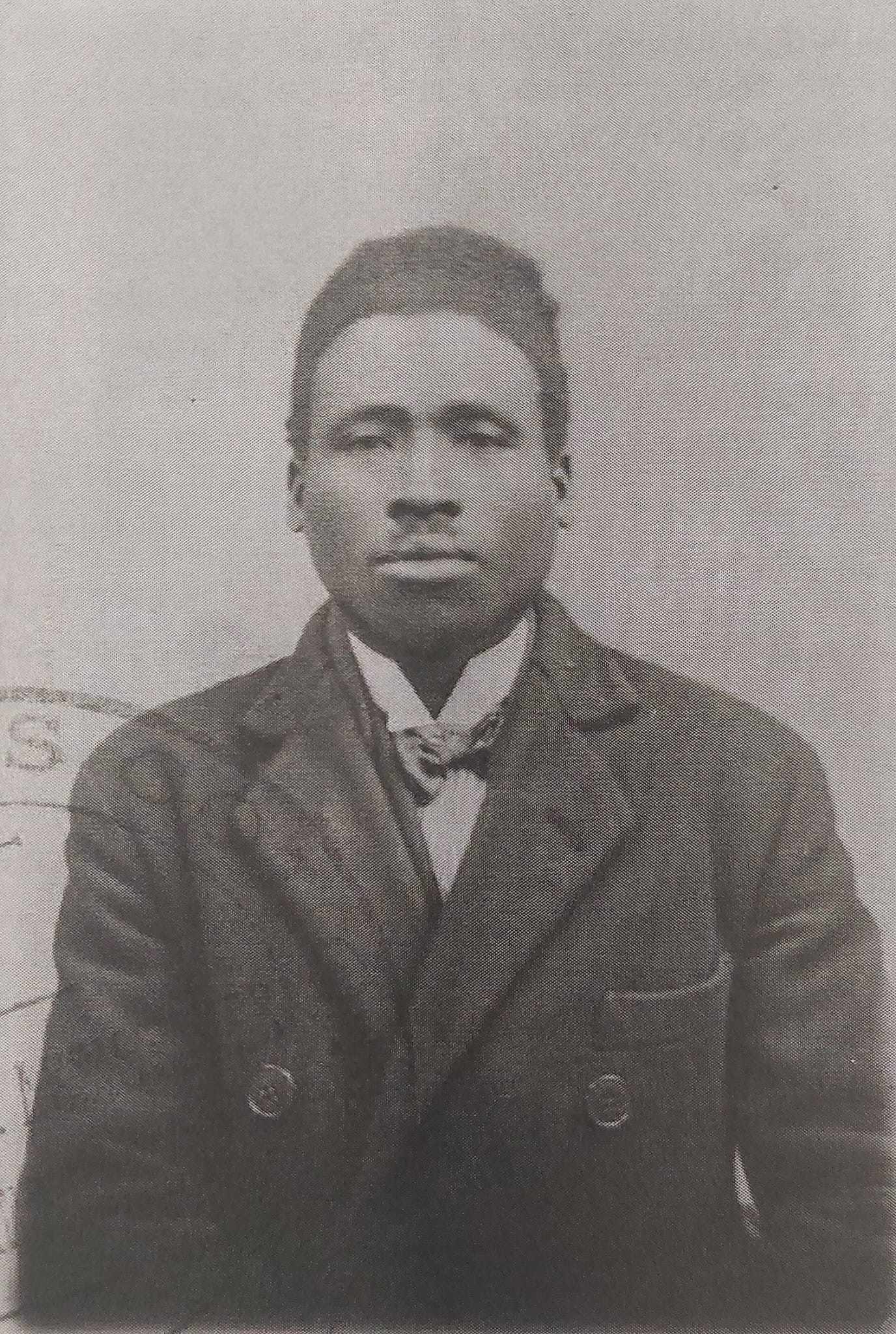
- André Matswa

Personal details
- Born: André Matsua Ma Ngoma; 17 January 1899 Mandzakala-Kinkala, Pool, French Congo (Now Republic of the Congo)
- Died: 13 January 1942 (aged 42) Mayama, French Congo (Now Pool, Republic of the Congo)

André Grenard Matswa (Matsoua in French; 17 January 1899 – 13 January 1942) was a Congolese anti-colonial activist of Lari descent who was born near Manzakala-Kinkala in then Middle Congo. An influential figure in Congolese politics pre-independence, he inspired a messianic cult, Matswanism or Matsouanism, which emerged in the French Equatorial African capital, Brazzaville.

== Biography ==
Matswa or Matsua (in Kikongo) was born in 1899 in a small village of Loukoua-Nzoko in French Congo. In 1925, he joined the Senegalese Tirailleurs and participated in the Rif War. In 1926, Matsoua founded Amicale des Originaires de l'A.E.F., a self-improvement group, while living in Paris. He attended events sponsored by the French Communist Party and helped develop black-based trade unions. Many came to consider Matsoua as a divine prophet, sent by God to liberate the Congolese from the French. According to author Victor T. Le Vine, Matsoua was comparable to Kimbangu, becoming a "martyr in the eyes of his followers" and developing a "quasi-religious aura".

In December 1929, he was arrested in Paris and set to be tried in Brazzaville, under the fallacious motive of swindling money of the African Indigenous people in French Congo. The money from free and voluntary contributions to the Indigenous people was also seized by the colonial administration.

When Matsoua returned to Africa in 1930, he was tried by the colonial government in Brazzaville for anti colonialism. On 19 March 1930, Matsoua asked the Court of Brazzaville for him to be tried as a French citizen with reasons of his naturalization and arrest in French territory. He was sentenced by the Court of Brazzaville to 3 years of imprisonment and was banned for 10 years from stepping into French Congo on 2 April 1930. A week later, he was sentenced to exile for ten years in Chad, where he escaped from Fort Lamy, Chad in 1935 and fled to France.

In 1940, during World War II, he was wounded on the front in Lorraine during fighting against the Germans and was sent to Beaujon Hospital in Paris for treatment. On 3 April 1940, he was arrested in his hospital bed in Paris under the accusation of attacking French state security members. He was then transferred back to French Congo and sentenced to forced labor in Brazzaville in February 1941. He was alleged to have spread pro-German propaganda around the capital. On 20 February 1941, he arrived in Mayama prison and spent another 11 months behind bars, having been tortured and beaten. He died in the prison on 13 January 1942.

== Legacy ==
After independence, Congolese politicians of many ideological shades attempted to capitalize on Matsoua's popularity, including Presidents Abbé Fulbert Youlou, Alphonse Massamba-Débat and Denis Sassou-Nguesso, as well as the insurgent leader Bernard Kolélas. There is a statue honoring him in Kinkala.

== See also ==
- List of messiah claimants

=== Bibliography ===
- Bruce Mateso, André Grenard Matsoua : Les fondements de l'Amicale, Paari éditeur, 2020.
- Didier Gondola, Mastwa vivant: Anticolonialisme et citoyenneté en Afrique-Équatoriale Française, Paris, Les Éditions de La Sorbonne, 2021.
