= Religion in the Republic of the Congo =

Religion in the Republic of the Congo (2025 DHS)
1. Christianity (87.2%)
2. None (8.10%)
3. Islam (2.70%)
4. Traditional faiths (0.40%)
5. Other (1.60%)

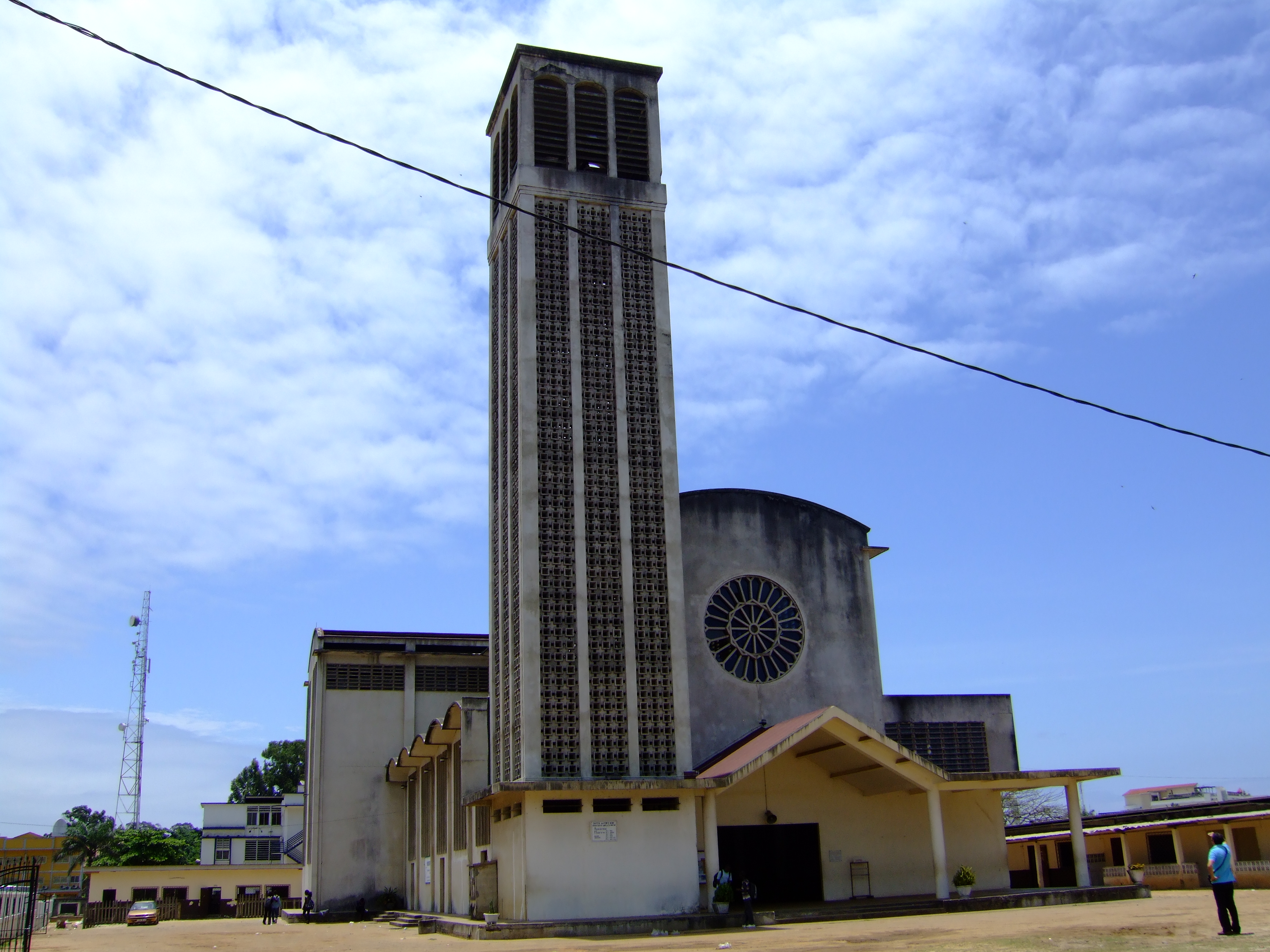
St. Peter's Cathedral in Pointe-Noire.

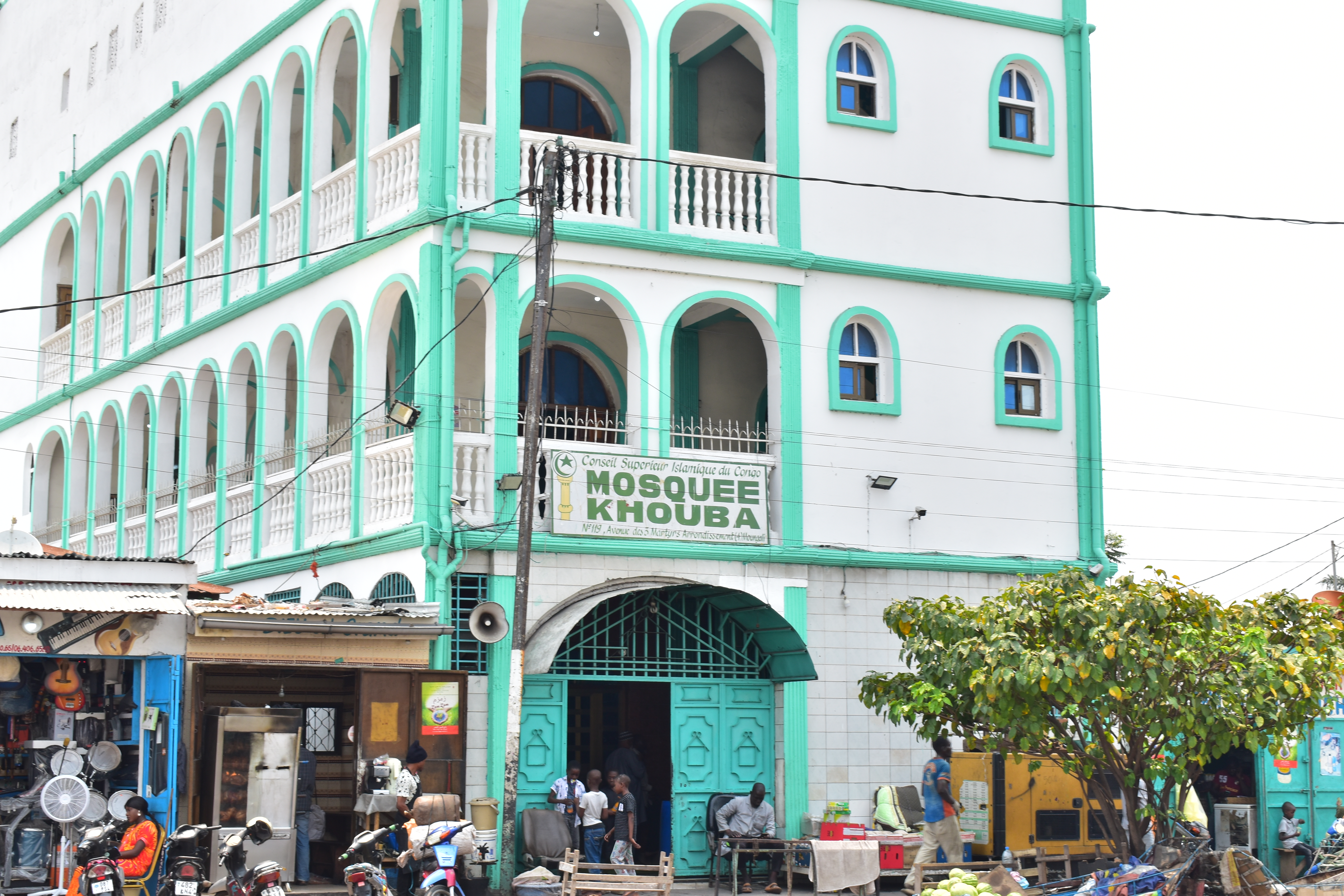
Khouba Mosque in Brazzaville.

Christianity is the predominant religion in the Republic of the Congo, with Catholicism being its largest denomination according to the 2012 census. Islam is the largest minority faith.

The Republic of the Congo is a secular state and freedom of religion is enshrined in the nation's constitution.

== Statistics ==
According to the government 2025 Demographic and Health Survey (DHS), 87.2% of the Congolese population between aged 15–49 identified as Christian, 2.7% as Muslim, 0.4% as adherent to traditional faiths, 1.6% as practitioner of other religions, and 8.1% as having no religion.

Religion	DHS Surveys	
Religion	2025	
Religion	#	%
Christianity	13,922	87.2
—Protestantism^{*}	8,978	56.2
—Catholicism	3,893	24.4
—Matswanism	800	5.0
—Jehovah's Witnesses	140	0.9
—Kimbanguism	111	0.7
Islam	434	2.7
Traditional faiths	62	0.4
Other	268	1.6
No religion	1,298	8.1
Total sample	15,984	100
^{*} Includes adherents of the Salvation Army, Revival Churches, and Adventism.

== Overview ==
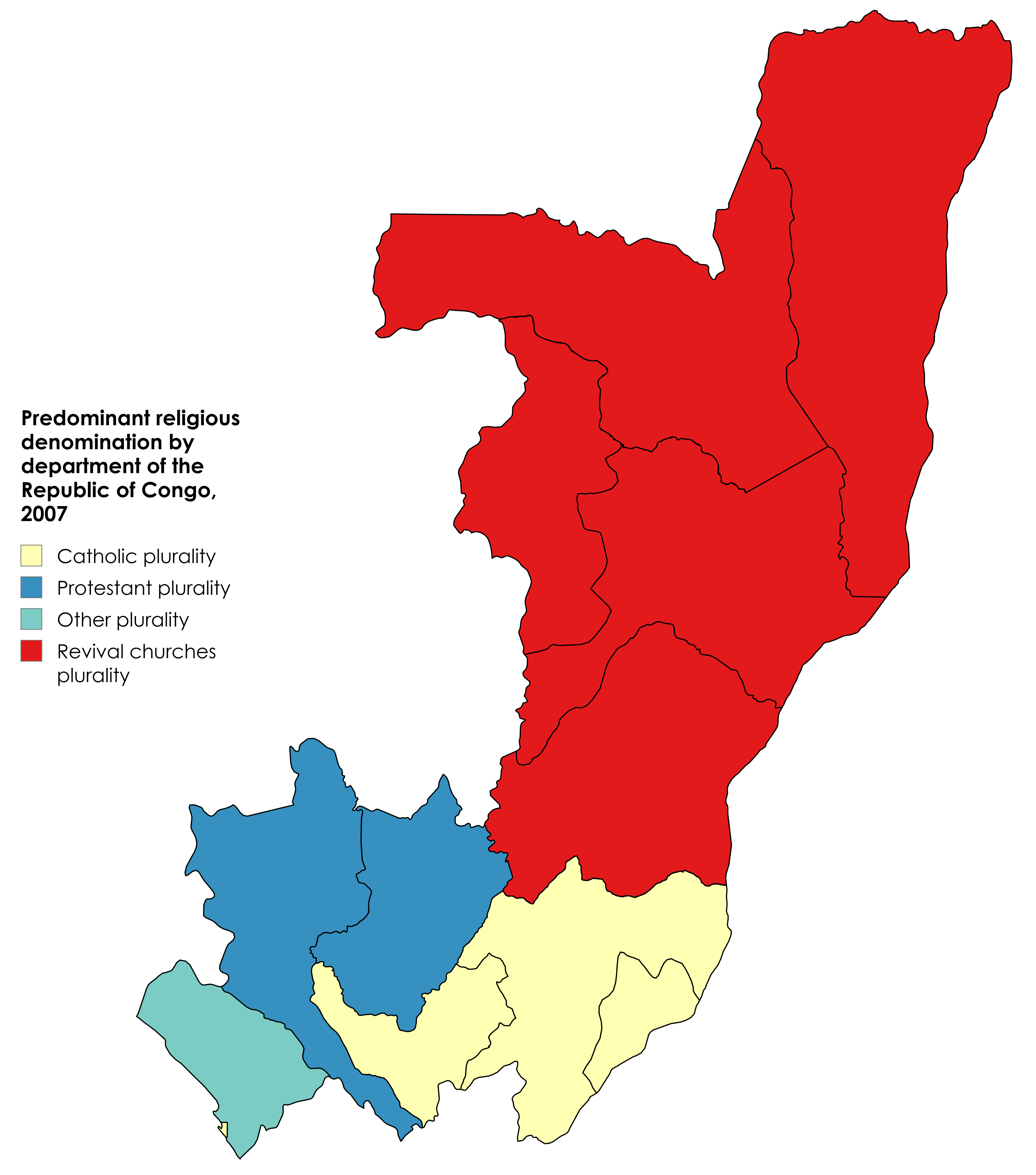
Predominant religious denomination in the Republic of Congo, 2007

Different sources give varying population figures for various denominations. The 2012 census reported 55% of the native-born population is Catholic, 32% Protestant, and 2% Muslim. However a government survey of the same year had 32% as Catholic, 55% Protestant, 2% Muslim, 9% other religions, and 2% atheist or unaffiliated. However, many people in the country are non-native-born Muslims who are not included in government statistics. According to the CIA World Factbook, in 2007 the people of the Republic of Congo were largely a mix of Catholics (33.1%), Awakening/Revival churches (22.3%), Protestants (19.9%), and none (11.3%). Smaller groups include Salutiste 2.2% and Kimbanguiste (1.5%). Followers of Islam made up 1.6%, primarily due to an influx of foreign workers into the urban centers.

Most Muslim workers in urban centers are immigrants from West Africa and Lebanon, with some also from North Africa. The West African immigrants arrived mostly from Mali, Benin, Togo, Mauritania, and Senegal. The Lebanese are primarily Sunni Muslims.

A small minority practice Kimbanguism, a syncretistic movement that originated in the neighboring Democratic Republic of the Congo. While retaining many elements of Christianity, Kimbanguism also recognizes its founder (Simon Kimbangu) as a prophet and incorporates African traditional beliefs, such as ancestor worship.

== Tenrikyo ==
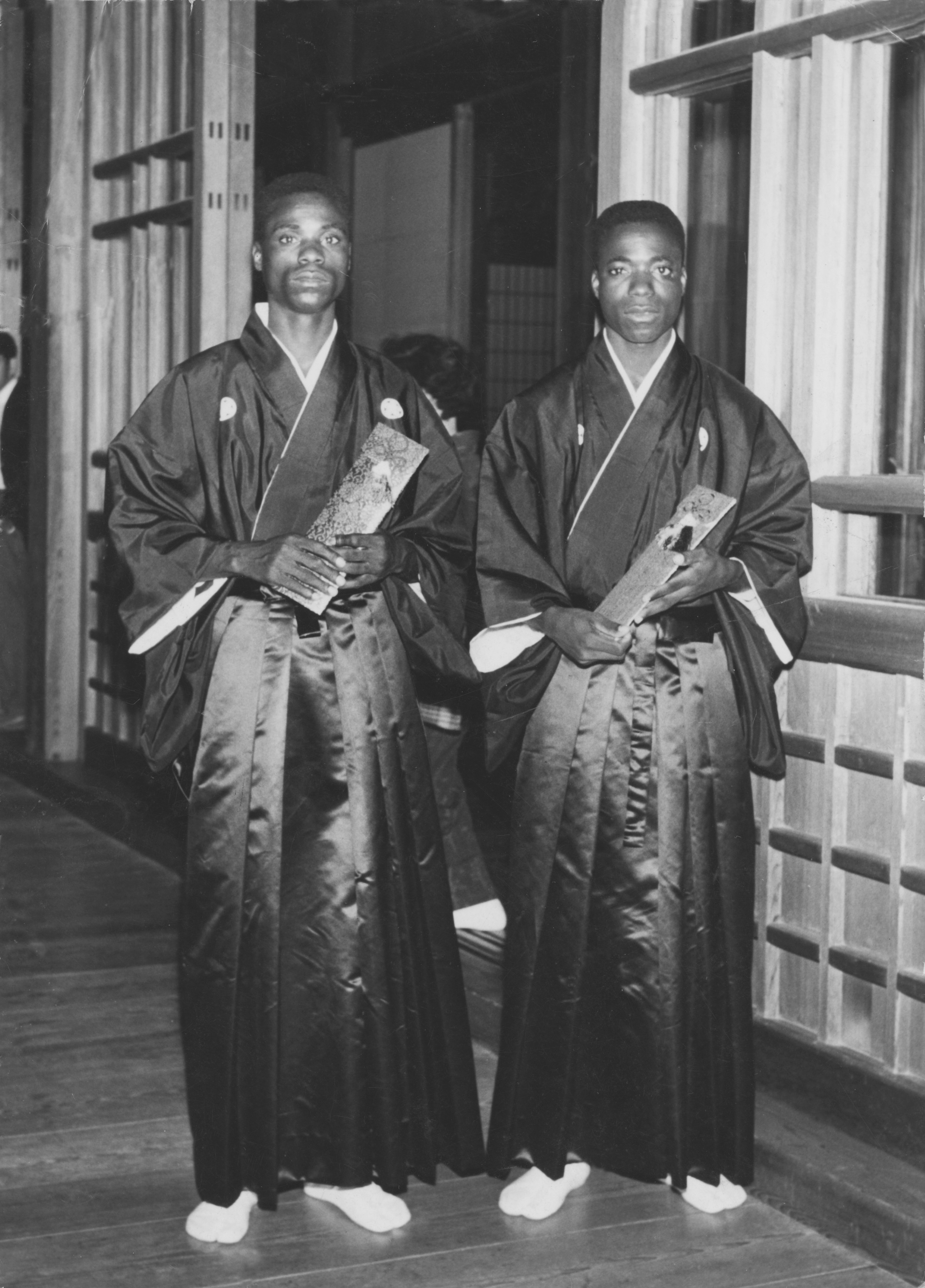
Alphonse Nsonga, the first Tenrikyo convert from the Republic of the Congo, and his brother Antoine Mayouma in Tenri, Nara, Japan in 1962

A community of Tenrikyo followers exists in Brazzaville.

During the 1960s, Tenrikyo, a Japanese religion, was introduced to the Republic of the Congo. Alphonse Nsonga and his brother became the first Congolese, and African, Tenrikyo converts in 1962. Alphonse Nsonga later became the head minister of Africa's first Tenrikyo church, the Tenrikyo Congo Brazzaville Church, on April 26, 1975.

== Freedom of religion ==
In 2023, the country scored 3 out of 4 for religious freedom. Though religions mostly act with freedom in the country at present, the government's attempt to implement socialist reforms in the 1970s led to the nationalisation of many religious institutions, such as schools, as well as restrictions on religious activities. This is a reality from which the Catholic Church, for example, has not yet fully recovered, operating a lower proportion of schools (10%) than in neighbouring countries.

== See also ==
- Catholic Church in the Republic of the Congo
- Religion in the Democratic Republic of the Congo
