= Islam in the Republic of the Congo =

Republic of the Congo is a predominantly Christian country, with Islam being a minority religion. Due to secular nature of the country's constitution, Muslims are free to proselytize and build places of worship in the country.

Islam spread to the Republic of the Congo from North Africa in the mid-19th century. The Muslim community in the country is estimated at 14 percent of the population. In 2005 a large new mosque was constructed in Brazzaville. Most workers in the urban centers were immigrants from West Africa and Lebanon, with some also from North Africa. The West African immigrants arrived mostly from Mali, Benin, Togo, Mauritania, and Senegal. The Lebanese were primarily Sunni Muslims. There was also a large Chadian Muslim population.

A number of native Congolese have also converted to Islam over the years. They have established their own Islamic associations and dominate the King Faisal mosque in the Brazzaville neighbourhood of Ouenze.

Muslim holy days are not considered national holidays; however, they are respected. Employers grant leave for Muslims who wish to celebrate holy days that are not on the national calendar.

== See also ==
- Religion in the Republic of the Congo
