= Abel Thauley-Ganga =

Abel Thauley-Ganga (born 20 September 1920) was a Congolese trade unionist and politician. He became treasurer of the CGAT trade union confederation. In 1953 he was elected as an alternate member of the executive committee of the World Federation of Trade Unions, representing French Equatorial Africa. He was born in Kinkala.

Thauley-Ganga was one of the key leaders of the 1963 revolution. After the revolution, he served as ambassador to the Soviet Union for a period.
