= Prosper Philippe Augouard =

French Roman-Catholic priest (1852–1921)

Prosper Philippe Augouard C.S.Sp.
- Apostolic Vicar of Upper French Congo
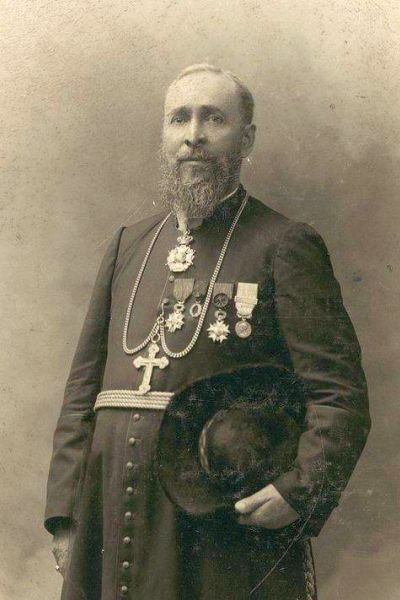
- Church: Catholic Church
- See: Apostolic Vicariate of Upper French Congo
- In office: 14 October 1890 – 3 October 1921
- Predecessor: Hippolyte Carrie
- Successor: Firmin Guichard
- Other post: Titular Archbishop of Cassiope (1915-1921)
- Previous post: Titular Bishop of Sinitis (1890-1915)

Orders
- Ordination: 10 June 1876 by Victor Delannoy
- Consecration: 23 November 1890 by François-Marie Trégaro

Personal details
- Born: 17 September 1852 Poitiers, Vienne, France
- Died: 3 October 1921 (aged 69) Paris, France

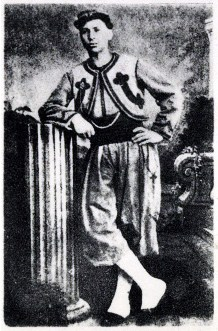
Philippe Augouard in 1871, as a Papal Zouave

Prosper Philippe Augouard, C.S.Sp. (17 September 1852 – 3 October 1921) was a French Catholic priest, missionary, and explorer of Africa.

== Early life ==
Augouard was born 17 September 1852 in Poitiers, France. His father was Francis, a carpenter. His mother was Jeanne Adèle, maiden name Barreau.

== Career ==
Augouard was educated at Montmorillon to become a French priest. When Augouard was at Rennes he was a volunteer in the Siege of Paris of 1870–71. During this time he met Bishop Louis Gaston Adrien de Ségur and learned the philosophy of being a Christian bishop. Augouard heard the story told by Antoine Horner of his missions in Zanzibar and East Africa, which motivated him to join the organization known as the Holy Ghost Fathers (C.S.Sp.). He then traveled to Africa in December 1877 as secretary to Bishop Le Berre, Vicar Apostolic of Gabon. In 1879, at age 27, Augouard went on an exploring expedition for about a month to the interior of central Africa. He arrived at Lake Nkunda (aka Malebo Pool) five days after the renowned Welsh journalist and explorer Henry Morton Stanley arrived there.

Augouard is known for exploring the Congo and Ubangi Rivers, for which he was awarded a prize from the Paris Geographical Society. Augouard settled in Brazzaville in 1887. In 1890 he was appointed Bishop of Brazzaville and vicar apostolic of the Upper Congo and Oubangui. In the process of exploration he developed Christian mission stations along some 1,300 miles (2,100 km) of the Congo River. Because of his rapid expansion of missions he was nicknamed Diata-Diata, meaning 'quick-quick'. He was also given the nickname Cannibal Bishop, because many of his Christian followers were former cannibals.

== Later life ==
Augouard returned to Paris for health reasons around 1920. He died 3 October 1921 at the Mother House.

== Accolades and awards ==
- Academy of Moral and Political Sciences award of $3000 in April 1912.
- Officer of the Legion of Honor
- Colonial Medal of Congo
- Medal of 1870
- Commander of the Order of Leopold
- Officer of the Royal Crown of Belgium
- Civic Crown by the National Society to Encourage the Good.

== Works ==
- (1890) La Mission de l'Oubanghi. Conférence, etc.
- (1895) Le Congo et son apôtre Monseigneur Augouard
- (1913) Les deux Congo. 35 ans d'apostolat au Congo français. Mgr. Augouard. Les origines du Congo belge.
- (1924) Un explorateur et un apôtre du Congo français. Monseigneur Augouard, archevêque titulaire de Cassiopée, vicaire apostolique du Congo français. Sa vie, par le baron Jehan de Witte. Ses notes de voyage et sa correspondence. [With plates, portraits, and maps]
- (1926) Monseigneur Augouard, etc. [With portraits]
- (1934) Guirlande enchevêtrée d'anecdotes congolaises

== Bibliography ==
- Anderson, Gerald H. (1999). "Augouard, Prosper Philippe". Biographical Dictionary of Christian Missions. Wm. B. Eerdmans Publishing. ISBN 978-0-8028-4680-8.
