= Stade Omnisports de Kinkala =

Multi-use stadium in Kinkala, Republic of the Congo

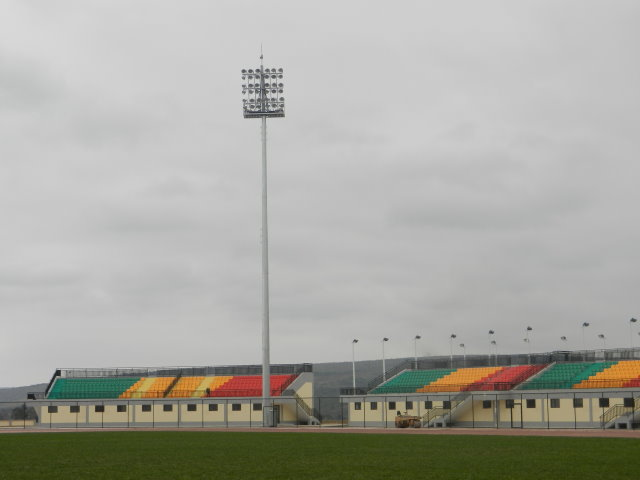
- Interactive map of Stade Omnisports de Kinkala
- Location: Kinkala, Republic of the Congo
- Coordinates: 4.35°S 14.7640°E
- Capacity: 12,000
- Surface: Grass

Construction
- Opened: 2012

Stade Omnisports de Kinkala is a multiuse stadium in Kinkala, Republic of the Congo with a capacity of 12,000 people.
