= Yves Marie Monot =

Yves Marie Monot C.S.Sp.
- Bishop Emeritus of Ouesso
- Church: Catholic Church
- Diocese: Diocese of Ouesso
- In office: 14 June 2008 – 8 December 2021
- Predecessor: Hervé Itoua
- Successor: Gélase Armel Kema
- Previous post: Apostolic Administrator of Ouesso (2006-2008)

Orders
- Ordination: 9 July 1972 by Jean-Baptiste Fauret
- Consecration: 7 September 2008 by Ivan Dias

Personal details
- Born: 29 May 1944 (age 82) Pont-l'Abbé, Finistère, North Zone, Nazi Germany

Yves Marie Monot, C.S.Sp. (French: [iv maʁi mɔno]; born 29 May 1944) is the former bishop of the Roman Catholic Diocese of Ouesso in the Republic of the Congo.

He was born in Pont-l'Abbé, France. He was professed as a member of the Holy Ghost Fathers on 8 September 1963. He was ordained a priest for the Spiritans on 9 July 1972. After his ordination, he continued studies in science and theology at the Institut Catholique de Paris.

Upon the resignation of Bishop Hervé Itoua on 22 April 2006, Monot was appointed apostolic administrator of the diocese of Ouesso. He held this position until he was appointed bishop of Ouesso on 14 June 2008. Monot was consecrated bishop of the diocese on 7 September 2008 by Cardinal Ivan Dias.
