= Cecile-Ivelyse Diamoneka =

Congolese teacher and poet

Cécile-Ivelyse Diamoneka
- Born: 1940 (age 85–86); Kinkala, French Congo
- Occupations: Teacher, Poet

Cécile-Ivelyse Diamoneka (born 1940 in Kinkala, French Congo), is a teacher and poet.

== Biography ==
=== Academic background ===
Cécile-Ivelyse Diamoneka completed her secondary education at Ngoundi, and then continued her studies in Brazzaville. She pursued higher education at the École normale supérieure in Saint-Cloud.

=== In administration ===
Trained as a teacher, she became the director of several schools and later the Director of Continuing Education at the Ministry of National Education. She was also a member of the National Council of the Union of Writers, Artists, and Craftsmen of the Congo. In 1991, she became the Director of Spiritual and Religious Affairs at the Ministry of Culture.

== Works ==
- Diamoneka, Cécile-Ivelyse (1982). Voix des cascades. Présence Africaine. p. 64. ISBN 270870415X..
