= Miguel Angel Olaverri Arroniz =

Spanish Roman Catholic archbishop in the Democratic Republic of the Congo

Miguel Angel Olaverri Arroniz S.D.B.
- Archbishop Emeritus of Pointe-Noire
- Church: Catholic Church
- Archdiocese: Archdiocese of Pointe-Noire
- In office: 22 February 2013 – 6 January 2024
- Predecessor: Jean-Claude Makaya Loembe
- Successor: Abel Liluala
- Other post: Apostolic Administrator of Pointe-Noire (2011-2013, 2024)

Orders
- Ordination: 5 May 1976
- Consecration: 28 April 2013 by Pierre Pican

Personal details
- Born: 9 May 1948 (age 78) Pamplona, Navarre, Spanish State

Miguel Angel Olaverri Arroniz (born 9 May 1948 in Pamplona, Spain) is a Spanish prelate and Roman Catholic Archbishop of Pointe-Noire in the Republic of the Congo.

== Life ==
Arroniz joined the Order of the Salesians of Don Bosco and was ordained a priest on 5 May 1976.

He was appointed Bishop of Pointe-Noire on 22 February 2013 by Pope Benedict XVI and ordained on 28 April 2013 by the Bishop of Bayeux, Pierre Pican, assisted by the Bishop of Kinkala, Louis Portella, and Archbishop Jan Romeo Pawlowski.

He became the first Archbishop of Pointe-Noire on 30 May 2020, when Pointe-Noire was elevated to an archdiocese.
