= St. Peter the Apostle Cathedral, Pointe-Noire =

St. Peter the Apostle Cathedral
- Cathédrale Saint-Pierre-Apôtre de Pointe-Noire
- St. Peter the Apostle Cathedral
- 4.8025°S 11.8733°E
- Location: Pointe-Noire
- Country: Republic of the Congo
- Denomination: Roman Catholic Church

The St. Peter the Apostle Cathedral (French: Cathédrale Saint-Pierre-Apôtre de Pointe-Noire) or Cathedral of St. Peter the Apostle in Pointe-Noire, is a religious building belonging to the Roman Catholic Church and is located in Pointe-Noire, the second largest city in the African country of the Republic of Congo.

It serves as the seat of the diocese of Pointe-Noire (Dioecesis Nigrirostrensis) that was created on September 14, 1955, with the Bull "Dum Tantis" by Pope Pius XII and is included in the ecclesiastical province of Brazzaville. The cathedral uses the Latin or Roman rite.

== See also ==
- Roman Catholicism in the Republic of the Congo
- St. Peter's Cathedral
