= Diocese of Dolisie =

Roman Catholic diocese in the Republic of the Congo

Coordinates: 4.1915°S 12.6750°E

Diocese of Dolisie Dioecesis Dolisiensis Diocèse de Dolisie

Location
- Country: Republic of the Congo
- Metropolitan: Archdiocese of Pointe-Noire
- Headquarters: Dolisie, Niari Department, Republic of the Congo

Statistics
- Area: 25,942 km^{2} (10,016 sq mi)
- Population: Total; Catholics: (as of 2023); 300,000; 103,700 (34.6%)
- Parishes: 15

Information
- Denomination: Catholic Church
- Sui iuris church: Latin Church
- Rite: Roman Rite
- Established: 24 May 2013; 13 years ago
- Cathedral: Cathédrale Saint-Paul
- Secular priests: 34 Diocesan

Current leadership
- Pope: Leo XIV
- Bishop: Toussaint Ngoma Foumanet, C.S.Sp.
- Metropolitan Archbishop: Abel Liluala

The Roman Catholic Diocese of Dolisie (Latin: Dioecesis Dolisiensis) is a Catholic diocese located in the city of Dolisie in the ecclesiastical province of Pointe-Noire in the Republic of the Congo.

== History ==
On 24 May 2013, Pope Francis established the Diocese of Dolisie from the Diocese of Nkayi.

== Leadership ==
=== Bishops of Dolisie ===
- Bienvenu Manamika Bafouakouahou (24 May 2013 – 18 April 2020), appointed Coadjutor Archbishop of Brazzaville
- Toussaint Ngoma Foumanet, C.S.Sp. (11 May 2022 – Present)
