= Anatole Milandou =

The Most Reverend Anatole Milandou
- Archbishop of Brazzaville
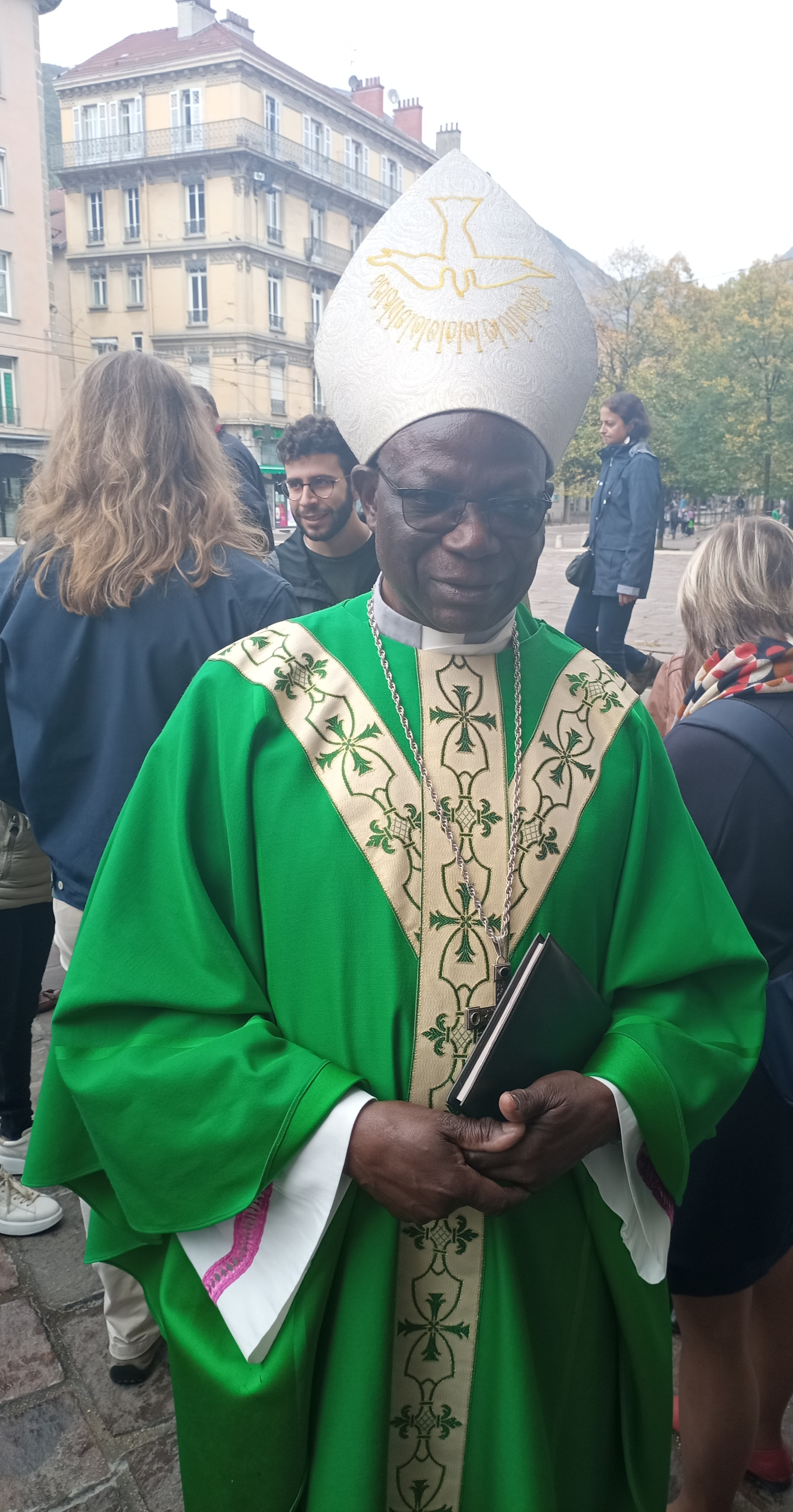
- Church: Roman Catholic Church
- Archdiocese: Brazzaville
- See: Brazzaville
- Appointed: 23 January 2001
- Predecessor: Barthélémy Batantu
- Previous posts: Titular Bishop of Capra (1983–87); Auxiliary Bishop of Brazzaville (1983–87); Bishop of Kinkala (1987–2001)

Orders
- Ordination: 23 June 1974 by Emile Biayenda
- Consecration: 28 August 1983 by Roger Etchegaray

Personal details
- Born: Anatole Milandou; 18 March 1946 (age 80) Nsamouna, Republic of Congo

Anatole Milandou (born 18 March 1946) is the current archbishop of the Roman Catholic Archdiocese of Brazzaville in the Republic of the Congo.

== Biography ==
Anatole Milandou was born on 18 March 1946 in Nsamouna, Republic of the Congo. He was ordained a priest for the diocese of Brazzaville on 23 June 1974. On 22 July 1983, he was appointed auxiliary bishop of Brazzaville with a titular bishopric in Capra. He was consecrated bishop on 28 August of that year. He was appointed Bishop of Kinkala on 3 October 1987. Pope John Paul II appointed him archbishop of Brazzaville on 23 January 2001.

From 1997 to 2000, Milandou served as President of the Association des Conférences Episcopales de la Région de l’Afrique Central (A.C.E.R.A.C.). From 1997 to 2003, he served as President of the Conférence Episcopale du Congo.
