= Ernest Kombo =

Congo religious official

Ernest Kombo S.J.
- Bishop of Owando
- Church: Catholic Church
- Diocese: Diocese of Owando
- In office: 7 July 1990 – 22 October 2008
- Predecessor: Georges-Firmin Singha
- Successor: Victor Abagna Mossa
- Previous post: Bishop of Nkayi (1983-1990)

Orders
- Ordination: 8 July 1973
- Consecration: 6 January 1984 by Pope John Paul II

Personal details
- Born: 27 March 1941 Pointe-Noire, French Congo, French Equatorial Africa, French Empire
- Died: 22 October 2008 (aged 67) Paris, France

Ernest Kombo (27 March 1941 – 22 October 2008) was a Congo-Brazzaville religious official born in 1941 in Pointe-Noire, French Equatorial Africa. He was ordained a Catholic priest for the Society of Jesus (S.J.) on 6 July 1973. On 5 December 1983, he was appointed the third bishop of the Roman Catholic Diocese of Nkayi and he was consecrated bishop on 6 January 1984, by Pope John Paul II assisted by Cardinals Eduardo Martínez Somalo and Duraisamy Simon Lourdusamy, inside St. Peter's Basilica. Following the appointment of Msgr. Georges-Firmin Singha as Bishop of Pointe-Noire, Bishop Kombo was transferred to the Diocese of Owando on 7 July 1990, as the second bishop of that diocese from the Republic of the Congo. He was very direct in his manner.

From 1991 to 1992, he was elected to head Congo's interim legislature, the Conseil Superieur de la Republique (CRS). In October 1994, at the General Assembly of the Synod of Bishops, at the Vatican, Bishop Kombo proposed that some Roman Catholic nuns be made members of the College of Cardinals, because of their mission to the Roman Catholic Church. Msgr. Kombo died in Paris, France, at the Val-de-Grâce Hospital of stomach cancer, on Wednesday, 22 October 2008, aged 67, where he was recovering from his poor health. According to his will, his body was repatriated to his native Congo for interment inside the small Catholic Cemetery adjoining the Metropolitan Cathedral Sacre-Coeur of Brazzaville.
