= Kinkala District =

Coordinates: 4°16′S 14°53′E

Kinkala
- District
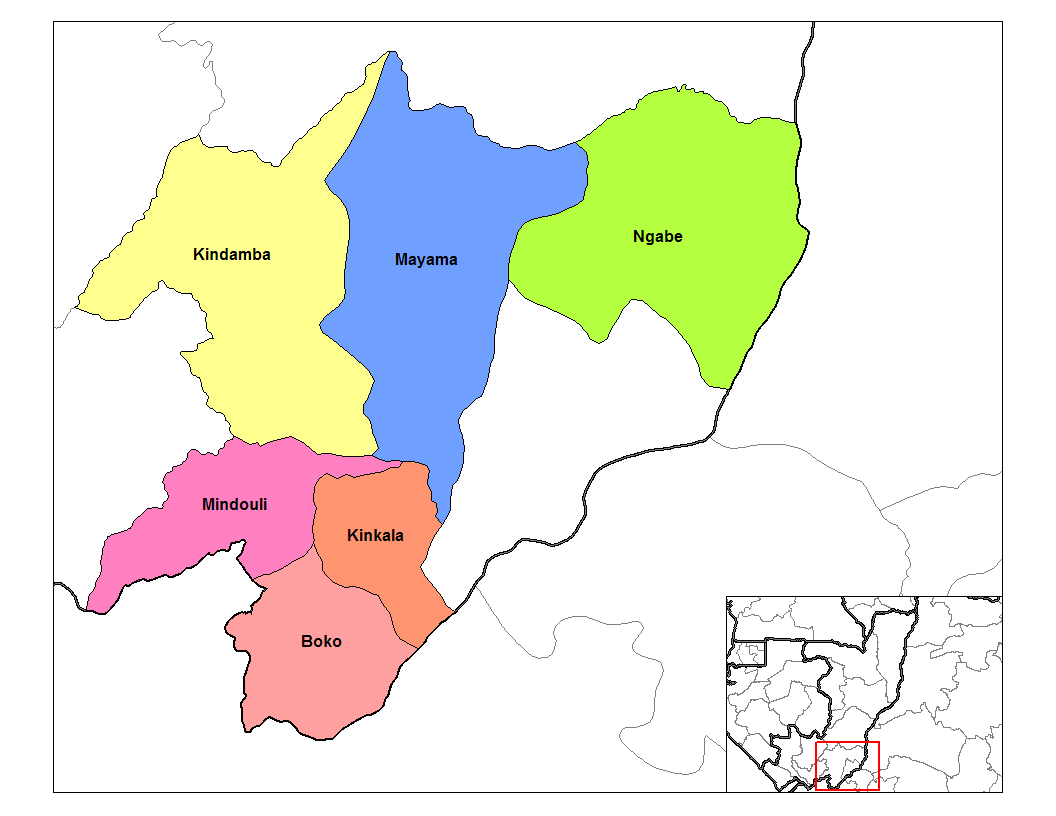
- Kinkala District in the department
- Country: Republic of the Congo
- Department: Pool Department

Area
  - Total: 635 sq mi (1,644 km^{2})

Population (2023 census)
  - Total: 50,528
  - Density: 79.60/sq mi (30.73/km^{2})
- Time zone: UTC+1 (GMT +1)

Kinkala is a district in the Pool Department of south-eastern Republic of the Congo, 70 kilometres (43 mi) south of Brazzaville. Its capital is Kinkala. The population is 50,528 (census 2023).
