= Société Amicale des Originaires de l'A.E.F. =

The Société Amicale des Originaires de l'Afrique Equatoriale Française was a social and political anti-colonial movement in French Equatorial Africa (A.E.F.). The association was founded by André Matswa in Paris in 1926. Its followers were known as matswanistes after their founder.

== Origins ==
Initially the association worked solely with self-help activities amongst Africans in Paris. Later the organization developed into a political movement. It demanded that French citizenship be given to all inhabitants.

The movement developed a following in Bangui and Libreville. Later it established a foothold in Moyen-Congo, where it became more influential. In particular the movement developed a stronghold in Matsoua's home region, Bas Congo. As of 1929, the movement had around 13,000 followers.

The association issued two protest letters to the French government in 1928, condemning the economic stagnation in A.E.F. (compared to Belgian Congo) and the law on the indigenous population. Matsou's political agitation began in a similar way as Ferhat Abbas' in Algeria, with a public call for civil rights.

In 1930, Matsoua sent two envoys to A.E.F. on a fund-raising tour. The reception was remarkable amongst the Bakongo in the Brazzaville area, and in a few weeks around 100 000 French francs were collected. Through the fundraising, lands would be bought back for the African people.

In the eyes of the French governor-general, the influence of Matsoua had now reached a critical point. He ordered Matsoua's two envoys arrested, and Matsoua himself was arrested in Paris and deported to Brazzaville. In Brazzaville he and his two envoys were convicted of sedition and fraud. Matsoua was sentenced to three years imprisonment. Following the trial, mass protests erupted in Brazzaville, and he was jailed in Chad.

== After Matsoua's imprisonment ==
The organization continued its activities semi-legally. During the 1930s, the matswanistes engaged in passive resistance against the French colonial authorities. They refused to pay taxes and dues to French-initiated saving schemes, and opposed a population and animal census.

Matsoua was arrested again in April 1941, accused of spreading pro-German propaganda. He died in captivity in 1942. Awaiting the return of its leader, the movement developed in a quasi-religious messianic direction. The matswanistes withdrew from public life, and transformed themselves into a close-knit secluded religious community.
