= Diocese of Kinkala =

Roman Catholic diocese in the Republic of the Congo

Coordinates: 4.3631°S 14.7557°E

Diocese of Kinkala Dioecesis Kinkalana
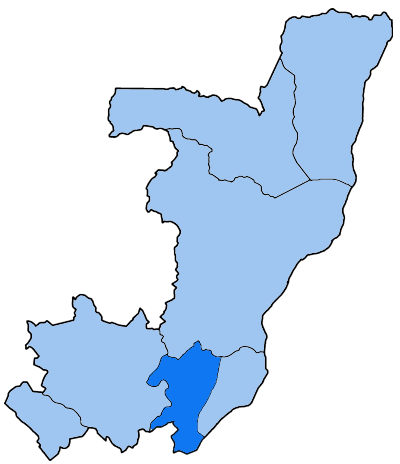

Location
- Country: Republic of the Congo
- Ecclesiastical province: Archdiocese of Brazzaville
- Metropolitan: Kinkala

Statistics
- Area: 22,000 km^{2} (8,500 sq mi)
- Population: (as of 2006); 88,500 (59.8%)

Information
- Denomination: Roman Catholic
- Rite: Roman Rite
- Established: October 3, 1987 (38 years ago)

Current leadership
- Pope: Leo XIV
- Bishop: Ildevert Mathurin Mouanga; Bishop of Kinkala
- Metropolitan Archbishop: Anatole Milandou; Archbishop of Brazzaville
- Bishops emeritus: Louis Portella Mbuyu

The Roman Catholic Diocese of Kinkala (Latin: Dioecesis Kinkalana) is a diocese located in the city of Kinkala in the ecclesiastical province of Brazzaville in the Republic of the Congo.

== History ==
On October 3, 1987, the diocese was established from the Metropolitan Archdiocese of Brazzaville.

== Bishops ==
=== Ordinaries, in reverse chronological order ===
- Bishop Ildevert Mathurin Mouanga (March 5, 2020 – present)
- Bishop Louis Portella Mbuyu (October 16, 2001 – March 5, 2020)
- Bishop Anatole Milandou (October 3, 1987 – January 23, 2001), appointed Archbishop of Brazzaville

=== Other priest of this diocese who became bishop ===
- Bienvenu Manamika Bafouakouahou, appointed Bishop of Dolisie in 2013

== See also ==
- List of Catholic dioceses in the Republic of the Congo
- Roman Catholicism in the Republic of the Congo
