= Archdiocese of Brazzaville =

Roman Catholic archdiocese in the Republic of the Congo

Coordinates: 4.2702°S 15.2739°E

Archdiocese of Brazzaville Archidioecesis Brazzapolitana Archidiocèse de Brazzaville

Location
- Country: Republic of the Congo
- Headquarters: Brazzaville, Republic of the Congo

Statistics
- Area: 14,450 km^{2} (5,580 sq mi)
- Population: Total; Catholics: (as of 2022); 1,440,090; 747,650 (51.9%)
- Parishes: 53

Information
- Denomination: Catholic Church
- Sui iuris church: Latin Church
- Rite: Roman Rite
- Established: 4 June 1886; 140 years ago
- Cathedral: Cathédrale Sacré-Coeur in Brazzaville
- Secular priests: 215 (138 Diocesan, 77 Religious Orders)

Current leadership
- Pope: Leo XIV
- Metropolitan Archbishop: Bienvenu Manamika Bafouakouahou
- Bishops emeritus: Anatole Milandou

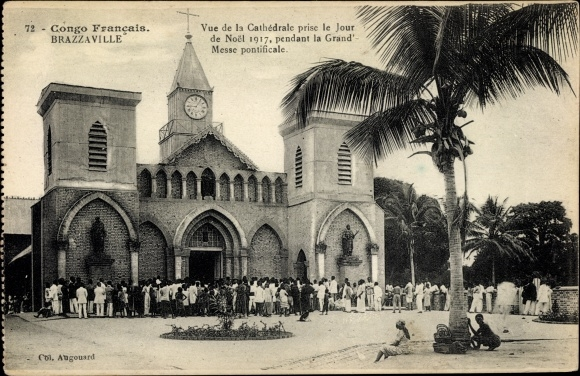
Cathédrale de Brazzaville during High Mass on Christmas Day (1917)

The Roman Catholic Archdiocese of Brazzaville (Latin: Archidioecesis Brazzapolitana) is the Metropolitan See for the ecclesiastical province of Brazzaville in the Republic of the Congo.

== History ==
On 4 June 1886, Pope Leo XIII established the Apostolic Vicariate of French Congo from the Diocese of São Paulo de Loanda in Angola and the Apostolic Vicariate of Two Guineas in Gabon. It was renamed as the Apostolic Vicariate of Upper French Congo on 14 October 1890, and again on 14 June 1922 as the Apostolic Vicariate of Brazzaville. It lost territory in 1950 when the Apostolic Vicariate of Fort-Rousset was established. Pope Pius XII promoted the vicariate to the Metropolitan Archdiocese of Brazzaville on 14 September 1955. It lost territory again in 1987 when the Diocese of Kinkala was established.

On 30 May 2020, the dioceses of Owando and Pointe-Noire were raised to metropolitan archdioceses, and consequently the province of Brazzaville was split into 3 provinces.

== Special churches ==
The seat of the archbishop is the Cathédrale Sacré-Coeur in Brazzaville, founded in 1887 by Monseigneur Augouard.

== Leadership ==
=== Apostolic Vicar of French Congo ===
- Hippolyte Carrie, C.S.Sp. (8 June 1886 – 14 October 1890), appointed Apostolic Vicar of Lower French Congo

=== Apostolic Vicar of Upper French Congo ===
- Prosper Philippe Augouard, C.S.Sp. (14 October 1890 – 3 October 1921)

=== Apostolic Vicars of Brazzaville ===
- Firmin Guichard, C.S.Sp. (12 June 1922 – 27 August 1935), resigned
- Paul Biéchy, C.S.Sp. (27 January 1936 – 18 July 1954), resigned
- Michel Bernard, C.S.Sp. (18 July 1954 – 14 September 1955 see below)

=== Archbishops of Brazzaville ===
- Michel Bernard, C.S.Sp. (see above 14 September 1955 – 2 May 1964), resigned
- Théophile Mbemba (23 May 1964 – 14 June 1971)
- Émile Biayenda (14 June 1971 – 22 March 1977)
- Barthélemy Batantu (15 November 1978 – 23 January 2001), retired
- Anatole Milandou (23 January 2001 – 21 November 2021), retired
- Bienvenu Manamika Bafouakouahou (21 November 2021 – Present)

=== Coadjutor archbishops ===
- Théophile Mbemba (1961-1964), succeeded
- Émile Biayenda (1970-1971), succeeded
- Bienvenu Manamika Bafouakouahou (2020-2021), succeeded

=== Auxiliary bishop ===
- Anatole Milandou (1983-1987), appointed Bishop of Kinkala

=== Another priest of this diocese who became bishop ===
- Urbain Ngassongo (1996-2013), appointed Bishop of Gamboma in 2013

== Suffragan Dioceses ==
- Gamboma
- Kinkala

== See also ==
- Roman Catholicism in the Republic of the Congo
- List of Roman Catholic dioceses in the Republic of the Congo

== Bibliography ==
- Maria Petringa, Brazza, A Life for Africa, Bloomington, IN: AuthorHouse, 2006, ISBN 978-1-4259-1198-0
