= Diocese of Impfondo =

Roman Catholic diocese in the Republic of the Congo

Coordinates: 1°38′N 18°04′E

Diocese of Impfondo Dioecesis Impfondensis

Location
- Country: Republic of the Congo
- Ecclesiastical province: Owando

Statistics
- Area: 66,044 km^{2} (25,500 sq mi)
- Population: Total; Catholics: (as of 2012); 274,000; 78,300 (28.6%)
- Parishes: 9

Information
- Denomination: Catholic Church
- Rite: Roman Rite
- Established: 30 October 2000 (25 years ago)
- Cathedral: Cathédrale Notre-Dame

Current leadership
- Pope: Leo XIV
- Bishop: Daniel Nzika
- Bishops emeritus: Jean Charles Émile Gardin, C.S.Sp.

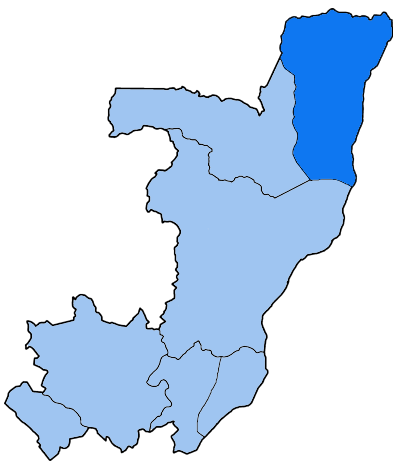
Map of the Catholic Diocese of Impfondo, in the Republic of the Congo

The Roman Catholic Diocese of Impfondo (Latin: Dioecesis Impfondensis) is a Catholic diocese located in the town of Impfondo in the ecclesiastical province of Owando in the Republic of the Congo.

== History ==
On 30 October 2000, Pope John Paul II established the Prefecture Apostolic of Likouala from the Diocese of Ouesso. It was elevated to a diocese on 11 February 2011 by Pope Benedict XVI.

== Ordinaries ==
Prefect of Likouala

- Fr. Jean Gardin, C.S.Sp. (30 October 2000 - 11 February 2011); see below

Bishop of Impfondo

- Jean Gardin, C.S.Sp. (11 February 2011 – 12 December 2019); see above
- Daniel Nzika (12 December 2019 – present)
