= Diocese of Gamboma =

Roman Catholic diocese in the Republic of the Congo

Coordinates: 2°04′38″S 14°41′09″E

Diocese of Gamboma Dioecesis Gambomensis

Location
- Country: Republic of the Congo
- Ecclesiastical province: Brazzaville

Statistics
- Area: 38,400 km^{2} (14,800 sq mi)
- Population: Total; Catholics: (as of 2013); 193,000; 110,000 (57%)
- Parishes: 7

Information
- Denomination: Catholic Church
- Rite: Roman Rite
- Established: 22 February 2013 (12 years ago)
- Cathedral: Cathédrale Saint-Pie-X

Current leadership
- Pope: Leo XIV
- Bishop: Urbain Ngassongo

The Roman Catholic Diocese of Gamboma (Latin: Dioecesis Gambomensis) is a Catholic diocese located in the town of Gamboma in the ecclesiastical province of Brazzaville in the Republic of the Congo.

== History ==
On 22 February 2013, Pope Benedict XVI established the Diocese of Gamboma from the Diocese of Owando.

== Ordinaries ==
- Urbain Ngassongo (2013–present)
