= Catholic Church in the Republic of the Congo =

The Catholic Church in the Republic of Congo is part of the worldwide Catholic Church, under the spiritual leadership of the Pope in Rome.

According to the Association of Religion Data Archives, 61.62% of the population was Catholic in 2020.

There are three archdioceses and six suffragan dioceses.

- Brazzaville
  - Gamboma
  - Kinkala
- Owando
  - Impfondo
  - Ouesso
- Pointe-Noire
  - Dolisie
  - Nkayi

== See also ==
- Religion in the Republic of the Congo
