= Émile Biayenda =

Catholic cardinal (1927–1977)

Servant of God Émile Biayenda
- Archbishop of Brazzaville
- Church: Catholic Church
- Archdiocese: Brazzaville
- Metropolis: Brazzaville
- See: Brazzaville
- In office: 14 June 1971 – 23 March 1977
- Predecessor: Théophile Mbemba
- Successor: Barthélémy Batantu
- Other posts: Cardinal-Priest of San Marco in Agro Laurentino (1973–1977); President of the Congo Episcopal Conference (1971–1977)
- Previous posts: Chaplain of the Legion of Mary (1962–1965); Titular Archbishop of Garba (1970–1971); Codajutor Archbishop of Brazzaville (1970–1971)

Orders
- Ordination: 26 October 1958 by Michel-Jules-Joseph-Marie Bernard
- Consecration: 17 May 1970 by Sergio Pignedoli
- Created cardinal: 5 March 1973 by Pope Paul VI
- Rank: Cardinal-Priest

Personal details
- Born: Émile Biayenda; 1927 Mfinkabitungu, Malela-Bombe, Kindamba, Republic of Congo
- Died: 23 March 1977 (aged 50) Brazzaville, Republic of Congo
- Motto: In verbo Tuo laxabo rete ("At Your word I will let down the net")
- Coat of arms: Émile Biayenda's coat of arms

Ordination history of Émile Biayenda
History
Priestly ordination
- Ordained by: Michel-Jules-Joseph-Marie Bernard
- Date: 26 October 1958
Episcopal consecration
- Consecrated by: Sergio Pignedoli
- Date: 17 May 1970
Cardinalate
- Elevated by: Pope Paul VI
- Date: 5 March 1973
Episcopal succession
Bishops consecrated by Émile Biayenda as principal consecrator
- Godefroy-Emile Mpwati: 7 December 1975

Styles of Émile Biayenda
- Reference style: His Eminence
- Spoken style: Your Eminence
- Posthumous style: Servant of God
- Informal style: Cardinal
- See: Brazzaville

Émile Biayenda (1927 – 23 March 1977) was the Archbishop of Brazzaville in Congo from 1971 to 1977 and was also a cardinal of the Catholic Church.

He was born in 1927 in Mpangala, Vindza. He was ordained to the priesthood in 1958 and was consecrated as a bishop in 1970. He was elevated to the cardinalate by Pope Paul VI in 1973. He was murdered in 1977.

His cause of canonization has commenced – he now has the title of Servant of God with the initiation of the cause in 1995 under Pope John Paul II.

== Biography ==
=== Birth ===
Émile Biayenda was born in 1927 in Mpangala, Vindza.

=== Education ===
Biayenda attended several institutions for education for his childhood studies and his studies for the priesthood.

- Catholic Mission School at Kindamba, 1937–1942.
- Catholic Mission School at Bjoundi, 1942–1944.
- Minor Seminary of St. Paul at Mbamou, 1944–1950.
- Major Seminary of Brazzaville, 1950–1959.
- University of Lyon in France, 1966–1969.

During this time in France, he obtained a licentiate in sociology and in Catholic theology.

=== Church career ===
He was ordained to the priesthood in 1958 and was later consecrated a bishop on 17 May 1970 by Cardinal Sergio Pignedoli. Biayenda was known for radical social views throughout his pastoral ministry. This was a contributing factor to his abduction and murder.

His view points on humanitarian issues were quite critical of his nation's government. This strained relations between the church and state. He spoke out against state injustices and on persecution. He also participated in the Synod of Bishops in 1971 and sent a pastoral letter in Congo on the theme of development and the role of Catholics in the nation.

Pope Paul VI created him the Cardinal-Priest of San Marco Agro in Lauretino in the consistory of 5 March 1973. His elevation made him the first cardinal from Congo.

=== Murder ===
He was abducted from his residence next to the Sacred Heart Cathedral of Brazzaville in the afternoon of 22 March 1977 and was killed on the night of 23 March 1977 by a group of soldiers. The real cause for this is still undetermined.

=== Beatification cause ===
A cause for canonization was opened at the behest of Pope John Paul II via the Congregation for the Causes of Saints on 20 March 1995. He was granted the posthumous title of Servant of God as a result of the opening.

The diocesan process for the late cardinal's beatification spanned from 21 October 1996 and was finished on 14 June 2003. A historical commission was assigned to the cause and completed its work in 2014. The Congregation later validated the diocesan process on 29 May 2015. The next step would be for him to be declared Venerable with the recognition of his heroic virtues.
