= Diocese of Ouesso =

Roman Catholic diocese in the Republic of the Congo

Coordinates: 1°36′49″N 16°03′06″E

Diocese of Ouesso Dioecesis Uessitana

Location
- Country: Republic of the Congo
- Ecclesiastical province: Owando

Statistics
- Area: 55,795 km^{2} (21,543 sq mi)
- Population: (as of 2004); 25,000 (38.1%)

Information
- Denomination: Roman Catholic
- Rite: Roman Rite
- Established: June 6, 1983 (42 years ago)
- Cathedral: Cathedral of Saint Peter Claver

Current leadership
- Pope: Leo XIV
- Bishop: Brice Armand Ibombo
- Bishops emeritus: Hervé Itoua; Yves Marie Monot, C.S.Sp. Gélase Armel Kema

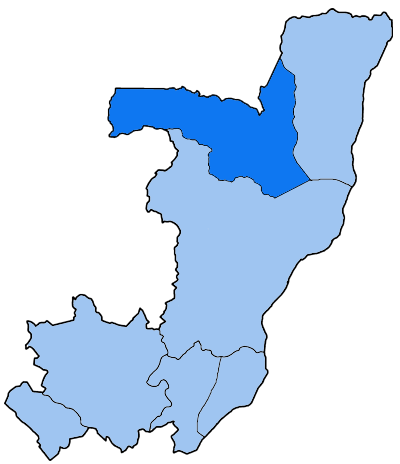
Map of the Catholic diocese of Ouesso

The Roman Catholic Diocese of Ouesso (Latin: Dioecesis Uessitana) is a diocese located in the city of Ouésso in the ecclesiastical province of Owando in the Republic of the Congo. The current bishop is Gélase Armel Kema

== History ==
The diocese of Ouesso was established from the Diocese of Owando on June 6, 1983. Its first bishop was Hervé Itoua.

=== Priests and religious ===
In 2004, the diocese had six secular priests and three religious priests. There were three male religious, and eighteen female religious. The diocese had 28 parishes.

== Leadership ==
=== Bishops of Ouesso ===
- Bishop Hervé Itoua (June 6, 1983 – April 22, 2006)
- Bishop Yves Marie Monot, C.S.Sp. (June 14, 2008 – December 8, 2021)
- Bishop Gélase Armel Kema (December 8, 2021 – May 28, 2025)
- Bishop Brice Armand Ibombo (May 28, 2025 – present)

=== Other priest of this diocese who became bishop ===
- Daniel Nzika, appointed Bishop of Impfondo in 2019

== See also ==
- Roman Catholicism in the Republic of the Congo
