= Diocese of Nkayi =

Roman Catholic diocese in the Republic of the Congo

Coordinates: 4.1817°S 13.2918°E

Diocese of Nkayi Dioecesis Nkayiensis
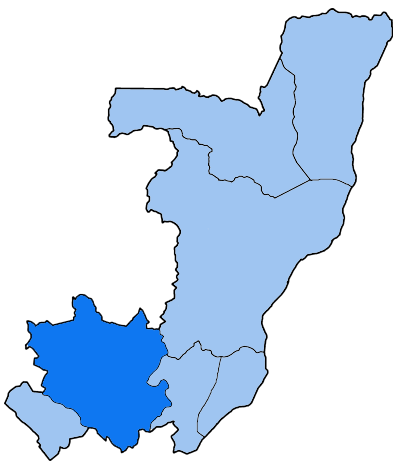

Location
- Country: Republic of the Congo
- Metropolitan: Pointe-Noire

Statistics
- Area: 59,140 km^{2} (22,830 sq mi)
- Population: Total; Catholics: (as of 2023); 640,000; 390,140 (61.0%)

Information
- Denomination: Roman Catholic
- Rite: Latin Rite
- Cathedral: Cathédrale Saint Louis

Current leadership
- Pope: Leo XIV
- Bishop: François Halyday Mbouangui

The Roman Catholic Diocese of Nkayi (Latin: Nkayien(sis)) is a diocese located in the city of Nkayi in the ecclesiastical province of Pointe-Noire in the Republic of the Congo.

== History ==
- 5 December 1983: Established as Diocese of Nkayi from the Diocese of Pointe-Noire

== Leadership ==
- Bishops of Nkayi (Roman rite), in reverse chronological order
  - François Halyday Mbouangui (1 June 2026 – present), Coadjutor since 1 December 2025
  - Daniel Mizonzo (16 October 2001 – 1 June 2026)
  - Bernard Nsayi (7 July 1990 – 16 October 2001)
  - Ernest Kombo, S.J. (5 December 1983 – 7 July 1990), appointed Bishop of Owando

== See also ==
- Roman Catholicism in the Republic of the Congo

== Sources ==
- GCatholic.org
- Catholic Hierarchy
