= Kinkala =

Towna and commune in the Republic of the Congo

- Town and commune
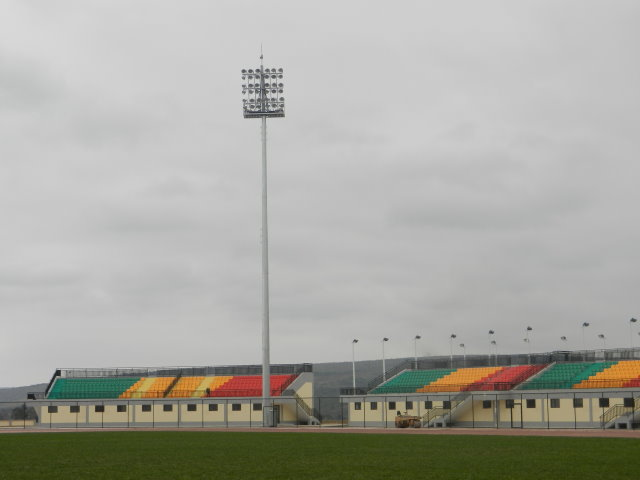

- Location in the Republic of the Congo
- Coordinates: 4°21′24″S 14°45′32″E
- Country: Republic of the Congo
- Department: Pool Department
- District: Kinkala District
- Commune: Kinkala
- Elevation: 407 m (1,335 ft)

Population (2023)
  - Total: 23,413

Kinkala is a town and a commune located in southeastern Republic of the Congo. It is the capital city of Kinkala District and the Pool Department. Its population was 23,413 in 2023, the date of the country's last official census.

== Notable people ==
- Cecile-Ivelyse Diamoneka (born 1940), poet and teacher
- Abel Thauley-Ganga (born 1920), Congolese trade unionist and politician
