= French Equatorial Africa =

Colonial federation from 1910 to 1958

Coordinates: 4.2667°S 15.2833°E

French Equatorial Africa Afrique-Équatoriale française (French)
- 1910–1958
- Flag Coat of arms
- Anthem: La Marseillaise
- French Equatorial Africa
- Status: Federation of French colonies (1910–1934); French colony (1934–1958)
- Capital: Brazzaville
- Official languages: French
- Religion: Catholicism and others
- Governor-General
  - 1908–1917: Martial Henri Merlin
  - 1951–1957: Paul Louis Gabriel Chauvet
- High-Commissioner
  - 1957–1958: Paul Louis Gabriel Chauvet
  - 1958: Pierre Messmer
- Legislature: Grand Council of French Equatorial Africa (1947–1959)
- History
  - Established: 15 January 1910
  - Disestablished: September 1958

Area
  - Total: 2,500,000 km^{2} (970,000 sq mi)
- Currency: French Equatorial African franc CFA franc
Preceded by
| Ubangi-Shari |
| French Chad |
| French Congo |
| French Gabon |
| Dar al Kuti |
| Wadai Sultanate |
| Ottoman Empire |
| Sanusiyya |
| Italian Libya |
| Aouzou Strip |
Succeeded by
| Central African Republic |
| Chad |
| Gabon |
| Kingdom of Libya |
| Republic of the Congo |
- Today part of: Central African Republic; Chad; Republic of the Congo; Gabon

French Equatorial Africa (French: Afrique équatoriale française, or AEF) was a federation of French colonial territories in Equatorial Africa which consisted of Gabon, French Congo, Ubangi-Shari, and Chad. It existed from 1910 to 1958 and its administration was based in Brazzaville.

== History ==
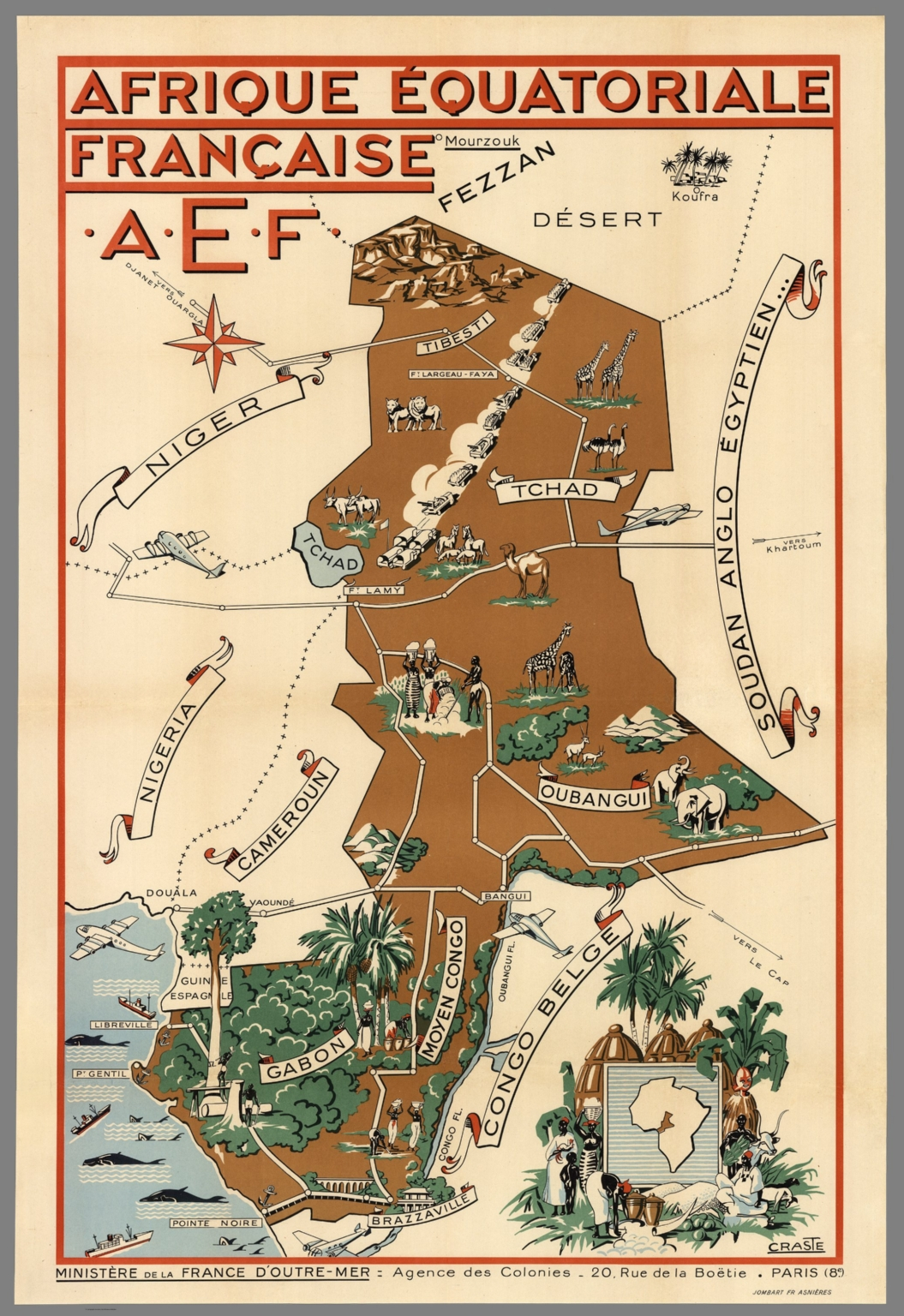
An illustration of the extent of French Equatorial Africa in 1951

Established in 1910, the Federation contained four colonial possessions: French Gabon, French Congo, Ubangi-Shari and French Chad. The Governor-General was based in Brazzaville with deputies in each territory.

In 1911, France ceded parts of the territory to German Kamerun as a result of the Agadir Crisis. The territory was returned after Germany's defeat in World War I, while most of Cameroon proper became a French League of Nations mandate not integrated into the AEF.

French Equatorial Africa, especially the region of Ubangi-Shari, had a similar concession system as the Congo Free State and similar atrocities were also committed there. During the reign of Leopold II large groups of refugees fled from the Congo Free State into areas in French Equatorial Africa to escape the dire conditions in the Leopoldian rubber areas. The violence in the French rubber regions was so extreme however, that many eventually fled back to the areas under Belgian colonial control.

Writer André Gide traveled to Ubangi-Shari and was told by inhabitants about atrocities including mutilations, dismemberments, executions, the burning of children, and villagers being forcibly bound to large beams and made to walk until dropping from exhaustion and thirst. Gide's book Travels in the Congo, published in 1927, was fiercely critical of the system of the concession companies in French Equatorial Africa. The book had an important impact on the anti-colonialist movement in France. The number of victims under the French concession system in Ubangi-Shari and other parts of French Equatorial Africa remains unknown. Adam Hochschild estimates a population decrease of half in the French Congo and Gabon, similar to his estimate of the population decline in the Congo Free State.

In French Equatorial Africa, the French authorities long tolerated indigenous slavery, but finally acted against the slave trade of the Sultan of Dar Kuti in 1908, and took action against his slave raids in 1911, declaring the slaves in Dar al Kuti free and annexing the territory in 1912.

During the late 1920s and early 1930s an anti-colonial movement Société Amicale des Originaires de l'A.E.F. was established by André Matsoua, seeking French citizenship for the territory's inhabitants.

During World War II, French Cameroon and the entirety of the AEF except for Gabon rallied to the Free French Forces in August 1940, Gabon instead remained loyal to Vichy France until 12 November 1940 when the Vichy administration withdrew following the Battle of Gabon. The federation became the strategic centre of Free French activities in Africa. Félix Eboué was installed as Governor-General of AEF. A separate administrative structure was established under the auspices of Free French Africa grouping both AEF and Cameroon.

Under the Fourth Republic (1946–1958), the federation was represented in the French parliament. When the territories voted in the September 1958 referendum to become autonomous within the French Community, the federation was dissolved. In 1959 the new republics formed an interim association called the Union of Central African Republics, before becoming fully independent in August 1960.

== Administration ==
French Equatorial Africa began with the concept of association, which was implemented through treaties promising French protection by the Italian-French explorer Pierre Savorgnan de Brazza during the mid-1800s, who convinced indigenous communities to cooperate with the French in exchange for greater trade opportunities. This association eventually led to French indirect rule in the region. However, France's attempts at indirect rule faced consistent resistance from local leaders.

The AEF was perceived by France as an unstable colony. Therefore, France granted private companies contracts for the exploitation of natural resources like ivory and rubber, rather than sustainable investment. Private companies implemented heavy taxation with little to no pay and cruel treatment towards workers and the local communities.

In 1908 French Equatorial Africa was divided into four colonies in hopes of strengthening French authority within the region. Until 1934, French Equatorial Africa was a federation of French colonies like French West Africa. That year, however, the AEF became a unitary entity, its constituent colonies becoming known as regions, and later became known as territories in 1937. There was a single budget for the unified colony; prior to unification, each member had had its own finances.

As of 1942, the AEF was administered by a governor-general, who had "the supreme direction of all services, both civil and military." However, the difference in numbers between administrators and the local populace made it difficult for the French to exercise power outside of their headquarters without voluntary or involuntary indigenous cooperation. Additionally, the governor-general's power was limited in practice by France's centralizing colonial policy. "Most important legislation is enacted in Paris," wrote the authors of the 1942 British naval intelligence handbook for the colony, "whilst the governor-general fills in minor details and penalties." The governor-general was assisted by a consultative council of administration (Conseil d'administration) composed of important local officials and some members, both African and European, elected indirectly. All major administration positions were appointed by French government and were not accountable to officials elected by the African people. Additionally, France held complete control over diplomacy, defense, and politics.

Under the unified colony, three of the constituent territories, Chad, Gabon, and Ubangi-Shari, were administered by a governor, while Moyen-Congo was under the purview of the governor-general. Each had a council of local interests (Conseil des intérêts locaux) similar to the council of administration. Locally, the territories were subdivided into départements and subdivisions overseen by appointed officials. The only municipalities were the capitals of the territories, which were classified as communes mixtes as opposed to Senegal's communes de plein exercice, which had democratically elected councils. Although these municipalities possessed certain powers of local self-government, their mayors and councils—which included African representatives—were appointed.

== Geography ==
Accounting for a little less than an eighth of Africa, across modern day Central African Republic, Republic of Chad, Republic of the Congo, Republic of Gabon, and most of Cameroon, the greater part of French Equatorial Africa extended over a granite plateau, framed by the Tibesti, Ouadaï, and Fertit massifs to the northeast, Darfur to the east and the Crystal mountains and Mayombe in the southwest. Two basins occupied the central and southern parts of the territory: the basin of Chad, a former inland sea of which Lake Chad is a remnant, and the basin of Congo, traversed by the river of the same name and its main tributaries (Oubangui River, Sangha River, and Alima River). A coastal plain stretched from mainland Spanish Guinea (now Equatorial Guinea) to the Congo River. The highest point in French Equatorial Africa was Mount Emi Koussi (3,415 meters) in Tibesti.

Due to the very size of the territory, the climate varied extremely from one point to another, going from a particularly arid Saharan climate in the north to a humid tropical climate in the southern part. The vegetation was affected by these differences: in the north, the virtual absence of rain made it nearly impossible for vegetation to develop, apart from a few thorny shrubs; in the center lay the domain of the savannahs, where millet, peanuts and cassava were grown; finally to the south were the humid tropical forests, from which various species such as ebony and okoumé were taken. In the coastal regions, vanilla, cocoa and coffee trees were grown.

French Equatorial Africa was bounded by British Nigeria, French West Africa, Italian Libya, Anglo-Egyptian Sudan and the Belgian Congo. To the west, it bordered the Atlantic Ocean.

Territories:

- French Chad
- Ubangi-Shari
- French Congo
- French Gabon

== See also ==
- List of colonial heads of French Equatorial Africa
- French colonial empire
- Free French Africa
- French West Africa
- List of French possessions and colonies
- French colonial flags
- French North Africa
- Economic Community of Central African States
- Central African CFA franc

== Bibliography ==
- Adu Boahen, Albert, ed. Africa under Colonial Domination: 1880–1935 (Yale UP, 1967).
- Coghe, Samuël. "A New Pastoral Frontier: Colonial Development, Environmental Knowledge, and the Introduction of Trypanotolerant Cattle in French Equatorial Africa, 1945–1960." Environmental History 27.4 (2022): 692-721. online
- Cornevin, Robert. "History of French Equatorial Africa until independence." in Africa South of the Sahara 1987 (1986).
- Daughton, J. P. "The 'Pacha affair' reconsidered: violence and colonial rule in interwar French Equatorial Africa." Journal of Modern History 91.3 (2019): 493-524 online
- de Vries, Lotje, and Joseph Mangarella. "Workshop Report: Tracing Legacies of Violence in French Equatorial Africa." Africa Spectrum 54.2 (2019): 162-172. online
- Gardinier, David E. "Education in French Equatorial Africa, 1842-1945." Proceedings of the Meeting of the French Colonial Historical Society. Vol. 3 (Michigan State University Press, 1978) online.
- Gifford, Prosser, and William Roger Louis, eds. France and Britain in Africa: Imperial Rivalry and Colonial Rule ((Yale University Press, 1971)
- Headrick, Rita. "The Impact of Colonialism on Health in French Equatorial Africa, 1918-1939." Proceedings of the Meeting of the French Colonial Historical Society Vol. 4. (Michigan State University Press, 1979).
- Hiribarren, Vincent. "Why researchers should publish archive inventories online: The case of the archives of French Equatorial Africa." History in Africa 43 (2016): 375-378.
- Jennings, Eric. Free French Africa in World War II: The African Resistance (Cambridge University Press, 2015).
- Klein, Martin. Slavery and Colonial Rule in French West Africa (Cambridge University Press, 1998)
- Martin, Phyllis M. "Colonialism, youth and football in French Equatorial Africa." International Journal of the History of Sport 8.1 (1991): 56-71. online
- Neill, Deborah. "Finding the 'Ideal Diet': Nutrition, Culture, and Dietary Practices in France and French Equatorial Africa, c. 1890s to 1920s." Food and Foodways 17.1 (2009): 1-28. online
- Pakenham, Thomas (1991). The Scramble for Africa, 1876–1912. London: Weidenfeld and Nicolson. ISBN 0-297-81130-4.
- Petringa, Maria (2006). Brazza, a Life for Africa. Bloomington, IN: AuthorHouse. ISBN 978-1-4259-1198-0.
- Shillington, Kevin, ed. (2005). "Colonial Federations: French Equatorial Africa". Encyclopedia of African History. Fitzroy Dearborn. pp. 260–261. ISBN 978-1-135-45670-2.
- Stanziani, Alessandro. "The Abolition of Slavery and the ‘New Labour Contract’ in French Equatorial Africa, 1890–1914." in The Palgrave Handbook of Bondage and Human Rights in Africa and Asia (2019): 227-245. online
- Stanziani, Alessandro. "The Welfare State and the Colonial World, 1880–1914: The Case of French Equatorial Africa." in Labor on the Fringes of Empire: Voice, Exit and the Law (2018): 251-316. online
- "France: Africa: French Equatorial Africa (French Congo)". Statesman's Year-Book. London: Macmillan and Co. 1921. pp. 886–888 – via Internet Archive.
- Thompson, Virginia, and Richard Adloff. The Emerging States of French Equatorial Africa (Stanford University Press, 1960) online book; see also online book review

=== Primary sources ===
- Naval Intelligence Division (1942). French Equatorial African and Cameroons. London, UK. online, 580pp; encyclopedic coverage of geography, government, people and economy
