= Democratic Republic of the Congo–Republic of the Congo border =

International border

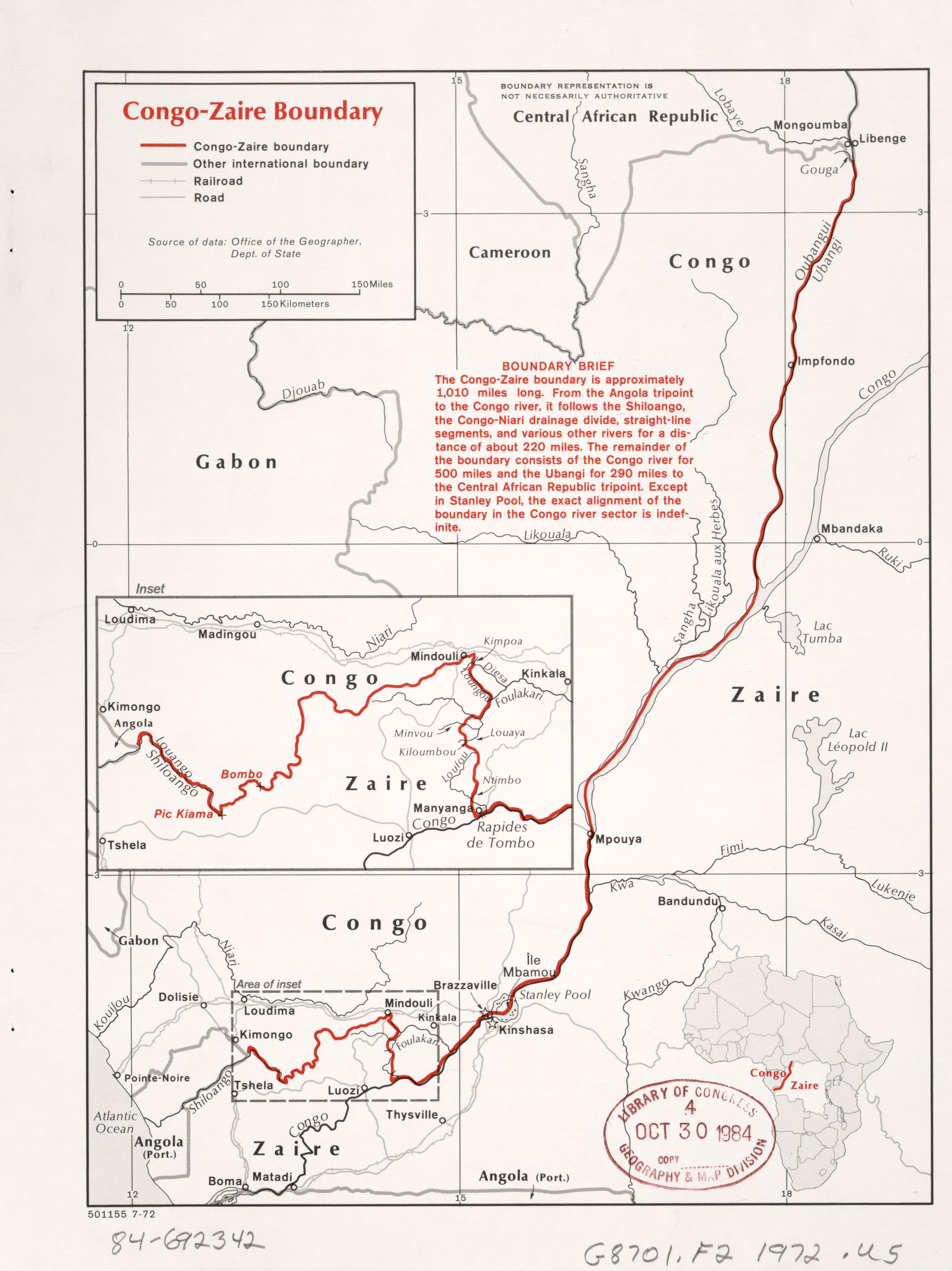
Map of the DRC-ROC border

The Democratic Republic of the Congo–Republic of the Congo border is 1,775 kilometres (1,103 mi) in length and runs from the tripoint with Angola in the south to the tripoint with the Central African Republic in the north.

== Description ==
The border starts in the south at the tripoint with the Angolan exclave Cabinda, and loosely follows several rivers including the Chiloango River. It then follows the Congo River, before reaching the confluence with the Ubangi River, one of its tributaries. Much of this segment of the border is poorly defined, and has been the subject of territorial disputes. The remainder of the border follows the Ubangi up to the tripoint with the Central African Republic.

== Settlements near the border ==
Democratic Republic of the Congo

- Kinshasa, Kwamouth, Bolobo, Yumbi, Irebu

Republic of the Congo

- Brazzaville, Impfondo, Dongou, Bétou

== See also ==
- Democratic Republic of the Congo–Republic of the Congo relations
