= List of national capitals situated on an international border =

This is a list of capital cities of sovereign states that share a border with another sovereign state.

== Current capitals ==
City	Country	Neighboring country	Neighboring city or subdivision	Notes
Asunción	Paraguay	Argentina	Clorinda	The border runs through the Paraguay River. There is no bridge across the river between the cities; all cross-border traffic must travel by ferry. However, road travel is possible by a circuitous route from the border crossing between Clorinda and José Falcón to Paraguayan Route 9.
Bangui	Central African Republic	Democratic Republic of the Congo	Zongo	The border runs through the Ubangi River. There is no bridge across the river between the cities; all cross-border traffic must travel by ferry.
Gaborone	Botswana	South Africa	North West Province	The border runs along the Notwane River and is connected to South Africa by the Gaborone Dam.
Bratislava	Slovakia	Austria; Hungary	Burgenland and Lower Austria (states, Austria); Győr-Moson-Sopron (county, Hungary)	The only capital to have land borders with two other sovereign states and one of two capitals to border two sovereign states. The border partly runs through the Danube, but swings west to include rural areas on the right bank of the river in Bratislava. There are multiple rail and road links to both Austria and Hungary. While not located on the border, the Austrian capital, Vienna, is close enough to Bratislava that the two share the same metropolitan area.
Brazzaville	Republic of the Congo	Democratic Republic of the Congo	Kinshasa	Kinshasa is the capital of the Democratic Republic of the Congo. The cities are separated by the Congo River. There are no bridges between the twin capitals; all traffic must travel by ferry. A proposal to build a Brazzaville–Kinshasa Bridge received funding in 2018.
Copenhagen	Denmark	Sweden	Malmö	While Copenhagen was initially established as capital due to its central position in the Danish realm, its eastern provinces - Scania, Halland, and Blekinge - were ceded to Sweden following the Treaty of Roskilde in 1658, making Copenhagen lie on the new eastern border, which runs through the Öresund. There is a bridge across the Öresund between the two cities, carrying both a road and a rail link; this link passes via Copenhagen Airport, which effectively serves both cities.
Kinshasa	Democratic Republic of the Congo	Republic of the Congo	Brazzaville	Brazzaville is the capital of the Republic of the Congo. The cities are separated by the Congo River. There are no bridges between the twin capitals; all traffic must travel by ferry. A proposal to build a Brazzaville–Kinshasa Bridge received funding in 2018.
Lomé	Togo	Ghana	Aflao	The cities are connected by road.
Maseru	Lesotho	South Africa	Mantsopa Local Municipality	The border runs through the Caledon River. The South African side of the border is rural. There are road and rail links across the border.
Monaco	Monaco	France	Alpes-Maritimes (department)	Microstate and city-state. The state is surrounded on three sides by various communes of the French department of Alpes-Maritimes (in Provence-Alpes-Côte d'Azur).
N'Djamena	Chad	Cameroon	Kousséri	The border runs through the Chari River. The cities are connected by a bridge.
Rome	Italy	Vatican City	Vatican City	Entirely surrounds the microstate and city-state of Vatican City.
San Marino	San Marino	Italy	Rimini (province)	Microstate. The microstate as a whole borders several municipalities (frazione) in the Italian provinces of Rimini (in Emilia-Romagna) and Pesaro and Urbino (in Marche).
Singapore	Singapore	Malaysia; Indonesia	Iskandar Malaysia (urban agglomeration, Malaysia); Riau Archipelago (urban agglomeration, Indonesia)	City-state and one of two capitals to border two sovereign states. The border with Malaysia runs through the Straits of Johor. There are multiple rail and road links across the straits. A rapid transit link is planned. Singapore also has a maritime border with Indonesia which runs through the Straits of Singapore, regularly served by ferries.
Vaduz	Liechtenstein	Switzerland	Sevelen	Microstate.
Vatican City	Vatican City	Italy	Rome	Microstate and city-state. Entirely surrounded by the City of Rome.
Vientiane	Laos	Thailand	Nong Khai	The border runs through the Mekong River. Nong Khai borders the Vientiane Prefecture but not the historic center of the city. The cities are connected by the First Thai–Lao Friendship Bridge.

== Capitals on disputed international borders ==
City	Country	Neighboring country	Neighboring city or subdivision	Notes
Jerusalem	Israel; Palestine	Israel; Palestine	West Jerusalem; East Jerusalem; West Bank	The Green Line runs through Jerusalem, which Israel and Palestine both claim as their capital. Israel formally annexed the entirety of Jerusalem, but no other country has expressly recognized Israel as the sovereign authority outside of West Jerusalem. Israel's borders with Palestine remain contested.
Nicosia	Cyprus	Northern Cyprus	North Nicosia	North Nicosia is the de facto capital of Northern Cyprus, which is recognized only by Turkey. It borders the rest of Nicosia, which is the capital of the Republic of Cyprus.
Georgetown	Guyana	Venezuela	Georgetown	Georgetown is the capital of Guyana, which is next to the Essequibo region, which Venezuela claims.

== See also ==
- Category:Capital cities for other lists of capitals
