= Alain Moka =

Congolese politician

Alain Moka (born 1953) is a Congolese politician. He was Minister of Health and Population in the government of Congo-Brazzaville from 2002 to 2005 and has been a Deputy in the National Assembly since 2005.

== Political career ==
Moka was born in Impfondo, located in the Likouala Region of northern Congo-Brazzaville. He is a medical doctor by profession and became the medical attaché to the Congolese embassy in Paris in 1997. He was subsequently a member of the National Transitional Council, which served as a transitional legislature from 1998 to 2002. In the May–June 2002 parliamentary election, he was elected to the National Assembly as the candidate of the Congolese Labour Party (PCT) in Impfondo constituency; he won the seat in the first round with 67.20% of the vote. Following that election, he was appointed to the government as Minister of Health and Population on 18 August 2002; accordingly, he succeeded Léon-Alfred Opimbat at the Ministry of Health on 22 August. Following an outbreak of the Ebola virus, which claimed 29 lives, Moka announced the end of the outbreak on 20 January 2004.

As Minister of Health, Moka was reportedly disliked by foreign donors and criticized for making little progress in improving the poor state of the health sector after years of civil war. The European Union demanded repayment of two million euros in aid that Moka was alleged to have redirected away from its intended use. He remained Minister of Health and Population until he was dismissed from the government on 7 January 2005; subsequently he returned to his seat in the National Assembly.

Radio Moka, a Likouala radio station owned by Moka, was ordered to be closed by the Prefect of Likouala on 1 September 2005. The station was accused of broadcasting partial information, as well as inciting hatred and division. According to Moka, however, the closure was in retaliation for the station's failure to cover an Impfondo rally in support of PCT Secretary-General Ambroise Noumazalaye in the midst of an intra-party dispute. In that dispute between PCT reformers and conservatives regarding the organization of the party, Moka was associated with the conservatives.

Moka has also been President of the Jean-Pierre Moka Foundation, a non-governmental organization dedicated to the development of Likouala. Founded in 1995, it was named after Moka's father. Moka visited Impfondo in early 2006 as part of a health initiative; he distributed mosquito nets to students and planned to send a supply of condoms to help combat the spread of HIV.

For the June 2007 parliamentary election, the PCT chose to nominate Charles Zacharie Bowao rather than Moka as its candidate in Impfondo. Unlike Moka, Bowao—who was Minister at the Presidency for Cooperation, Humanitarian Action, and Solidarity—was considered a representative of the party's reformist wing. Moka stood as an independent candidate for re-election to his parliamentary seat representing Impfondo constituency and was victorious, receiving 75.76% of the vote and defeating Bowao.

At the PCT's Sixth Extraordinary Congress, held in July 2011, Moka was elected to the PCT's 51-member Political Bureau. In the July 2012 parliamentary election, Moka was re-elected to the National Assembly as the PCT candidate in Impfondo; he won the seat in the first round of voting with 56.06% of the vote. At a meeting of the National Assembly on 19 September 2012, Moka read aloud the candidates proposed by the majority parties for posts on the National Assembly's seven standing committees; the proposed candidates were then elected by acclamation.

At the beginning of the parliamentary term, Louis Soussa was designated as President of the PCT and Allies Parliamentary Group; however, Soussa died in early 2013, and he was subsequently replaced by Alain Moka. In the July 2017 parliamentary election, he was re-elected to the National Assembly as the PCT candidate in Impfondo, winning the seat in the first round with 58% of the vote.
