= Henri Djombo =

Congolese politician

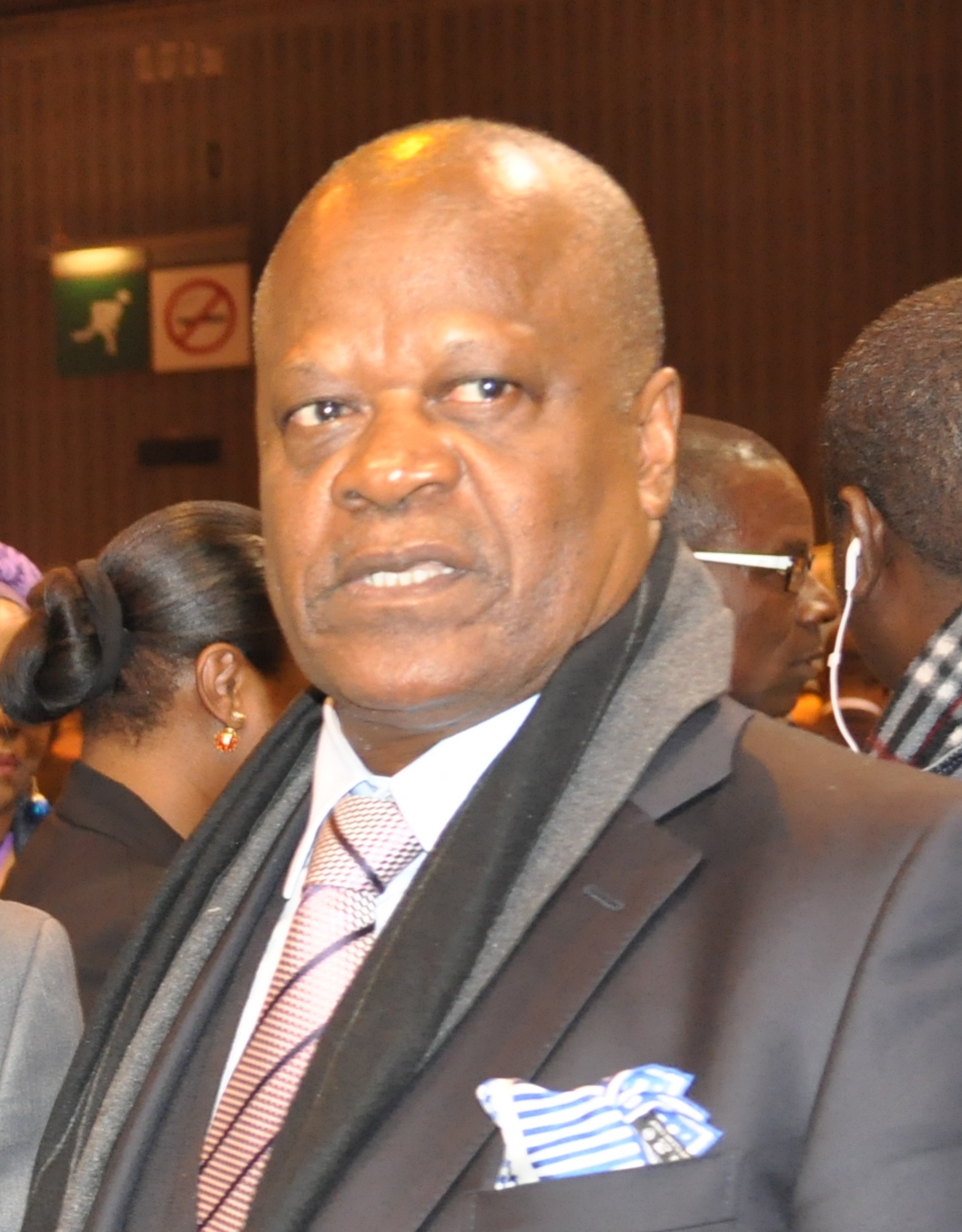
Henri Djombo at the 2015 Paris Book Fair

Henri Djombo (born 1952) is a Congolese politician who has served in the government of Congo-Brazzaville as Minister of State for Agriculture since 2016. Previously he was Minister of Water and Forests from 1980 to 1985 and Minister of the Forest Economy from 1997 to 2016. He is a member of the ruling Congolese Labour Party (PCT).

== Early life and political career ==
Djombo was born in Enyellé, located in the Likouala Region of northern Congo-Brazzaville, and studied in Leningrad in the Soviet Union. He joined the civil service in 1976, becoming an adviser to the Minister of the Rural Economy in 1977 and then Director of Studies and Planning at the Ministry of the Rural Economy in 1978. He was appointed as Director-General of the Rural Economy in 1979 and served in the government as Minister of Water and Forests from 1980 until being dismissed from the government in December 1985. He also joined the ruling Congolese Labour Party (PCT) in 1979, and in 1980 he became a member of the bureau of the Central Committee of the Union of Socialist Congolese Youth (UJSC). After leaving the government, Djombo was the Congolese Ambassador to Bulgaria from 1986 to 1988, and subsequently he was President and Director-General of the Sugar Refinery of Congo (Sucrerie du Congo, or Suco) from 1989 to 1991. He joined the PCT Central Committee in 1989.

At the time of the 1993 parliamentary election, Djombo was President of the Technical Commission for the election. Also in 1993, he was a member of the opposition's delegation to political negotiations in Libreville. Later, he was Vice-President of the Technical Committee for the Special Census from 1996 to 1997. Denis Sassou Nguesso returned to power at the conclusion of the June–October 1997 civil war, and he appointed Djombo to the government as Minister of the Forest Economy on 2 November 1997. His portfolio was slightly modified in subsequent years: he was appointed as Minister of the Forest Economy, Fishing and Fish Resources on 12 January 1999, as Minister of the Forest Economy and the Environment on 18 August 2002, and then simply as Minister of the Forest Economy on 3 March 2007.

Djombo led negotiations with rebels in the late 1990s. In the May 2002 parliamentary election, he was elected to the National Assembly as the PCT candidate in Enyellé constituency; he won the seat in the first round with 96.98% of the vote. He was again elected to the National Assembly in the 2007 parliamentary election as the PCT candidate in Enyellé constituency; he won the seat in the first round with 99.21% of the vote. As of 2007, Djombo is a member of the PCT Political Bureau.

In September 2006, Djombo announced plans to establish two environmentally-protected areas that would together total almost 1,000 hectares. He said on this occasion that the creation of the new areas reflected the government's commitment to ecological conservation: "The Republic of Congo depends on forest resource use for economic development, but it is also deeply committed to biodiversity conservation and sustainable forest management. It has already set aside an estimated 11 percent of the country's surface area as protected areas, 90 percent of which is tropical forest." The Wildlife Conservation Society called the decision "an extraordinary achievement for the entire Congo Basin region" and praised the Congolese government's environmental policy. Djombo said in a May 2008 interview that Congo's "rate of deforestation is the lowest in the region" and that "less than 3,000 hectares" of forest was felled annually. Djombo stressed that the government's policy was to balance the needs of the economy and the environment.

As part of a political struggle in his native Likouala, Djombo distributed an open letter in November 2007 that was addressed to the people of Likouala. In this letter, he accused his rivals from Likouala, particularly Ambassador to Italy Mamadou Kamara Dékamo, of slandering him over the course of two and a half years and plotting to kill him on 10 September 2007. According to Djombo, they planned to assassinate him at the Ministry of Forest Economics on the same day that the Ninja former rebels were in Brazzaville and to use the Ninjas as scapegoats. He said that this alleged plot "painfully reminded" him of an unsuccessful attack that he and his family escaped at their home on 7 June 1997, at the beginning of the 1997 civil war.

At the time of the July 2009 presidential election, Djombo was Head of the Electoral Affairs Department for Sassou Nguesso's re-election campaign. After the election, in which Sassou Nguesso won an overwhelming majority, Djombo's ministerial responsibilities were expanded on 15 September 2009, when he was appointed as Minister of Sustainable Development, the Forest Economy, and the Environment.

In the July–August 2012 parliamentary election, Djombo again stood as the PCT candidate in Enyellé constituency; he won the seat in the first round with 88.06% of the vote.

After Sassou Nguesso's victory in the March 2016 presidential election, Djombo was appointed as Minister of State for Agriculture, Animal Husbandry and Fishing on 30 April 2016. In the July 2017 parliamentary election, he was re-elected to the National Assembly as the PCT candidate in Enyellé, winning the seat in the first round with 99% of the vote.

== Regional and international roles ==
Djombo became President-in-Office of the African Timber Organization in October 2000, and he also headed the Conference of Ministers in Charge of Central African Forests (COMIFAC) for a time. At the 3rd World Congress of Biosphere Reserves, held in Madrid on 4–9 February 2008, he was elected as President of the Bureau of the International Coordinating Council of UNESCO's Man and the Biosphere Programme.

== Writing and sports ==
Djombo is a novelist. In the field of sports, he is a black belt in aikido. He has been President of the Congolese Aikido Federation and President of the Congolese Table Tennis Federation.
