= Jean-Marie Tassoua =

Republic of the Congo politician

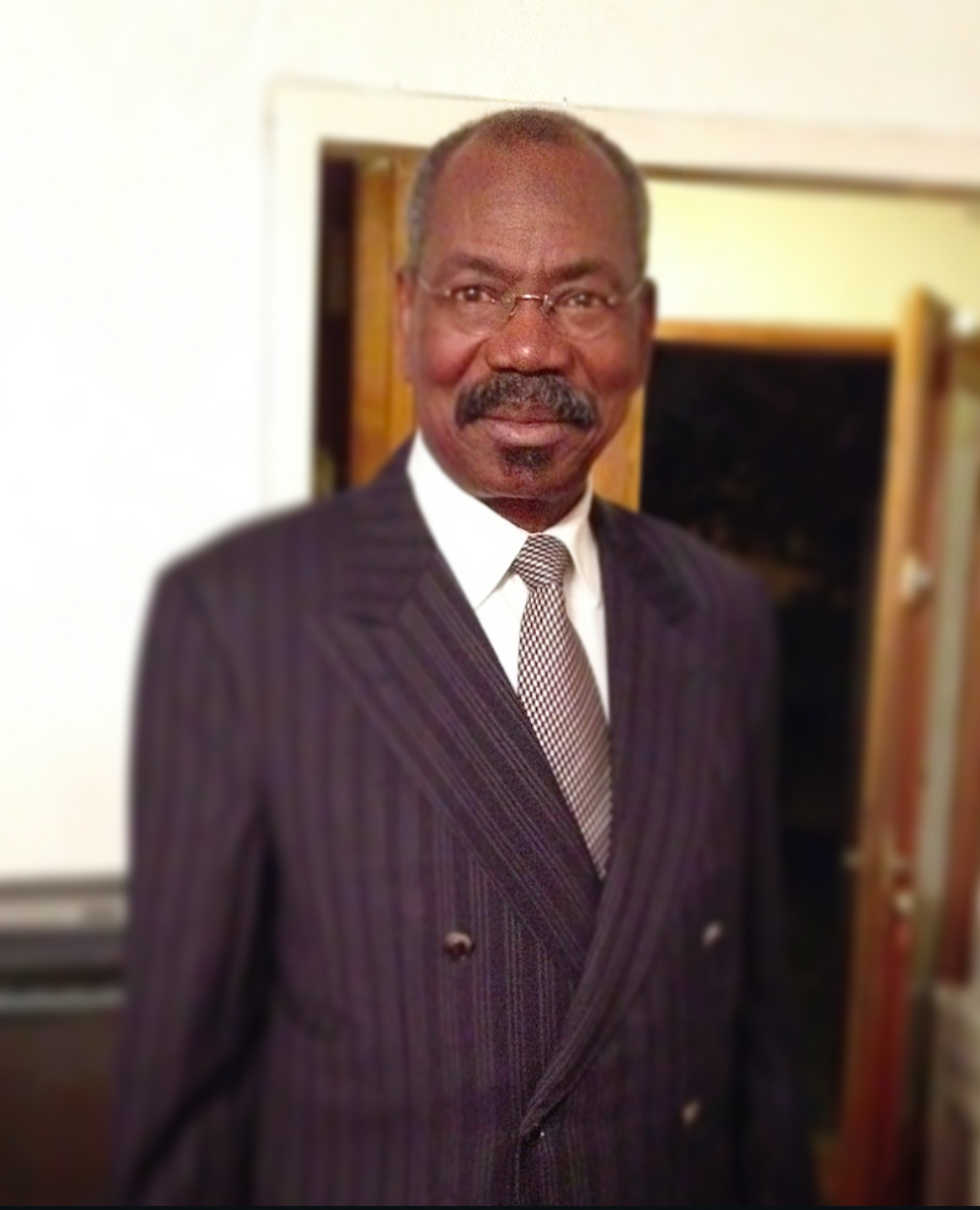
Jean-Marie Tassoua

Jean-Marie Tassoua is a Congolese politician. Tassoua was a militia commander during the 1997 civil war and served in the government of Congo-Brazzaville as Minister of Energy and Hydraulics from 1997 to 2002. He has been the President of the Economic and Social Council, a state institution, since 2009 and he was Co-President of the New Democratic Forces (FDN), a political party, from 2007 to 2010.

== Political career ==
An ethnic Mbochi, Tassoua was born at Enyellé, located in the Likouala Region of northern Congo-Brazzaville, and worked at Insurance and Reinsurance of Congo (Assurances et Réassurances du Congo, ARC). Beginning with the introduction of multiparty politics in 1990, he led a political party, the Democratic Rally of the Congolese People (RDPC). He participated in the February–June 1991 National Conference and was included on the National Conference's committee for the drafting of internal regulations. During the June–October 1997 civil war, Tassoua commanded Denis Sassou Nguesso's Cobra rebel militia; the war concluded with the capture of Brazzaville by the Cobras in mid-October. Speaking to the press after this victory, Tassoua condemned ousted President Pascal Lissouba, saying that "for five years Lissouba didn't invest one cent in the country", and he alleged that international mercenaries were hired to fight on Lissouba's side. Sassou Nguesso then appointed Tassoua to the government as Minister of Energy and Hydraulics on 2 November 1997; Tassoua was one of several Mbochis who held important posts in the government, demonstrating that the government was dominated by members of Sassou Nguesso's own ethnic group and other northerners. He retained his post as Minister of Energy for nearly five years.

Tassoua was a candidate in the May–June 2002 parliamentary election, but failed to win a seat. After the election, he was not included in the government that was appointed on 18 August 2002. Tassoua was subsequently appointed to the Economic and Social Council on 13 August 2003. The newspaper Le Choc reported on 20 July 2004 that Tassoua, together with a minister and two other former ministers, had been barred from leaving the country without Sassou Nguesso's approval due to suspicions that they had misused public funds. This report was denied on the next day by public prosecutor Georges Akiéra.

In March 2007, the RDPC agreed to merge with several other parties to create a new party, the New Democratic Forces (FDN). At the constitutive congress of the FDN, Tassoua, as the oldest of the FDN leaders, presided over its opening ceremony on 19 April 2007 and spoke about the FDN's purpose and programme. He was chosen to jointly head the FDN's National Executive Bureau together with Léon-Alfred Opimbat, and on 15 May he and Opimbat signed an electoral agreement on behalf of the FDN with the governing Congolese Labour Party (PCT).

In the June–August 2007 parliamentary election, Tassoua was elected to the National Assembly as the FDN candidate in the Dougou constituency of Likouala Region, where he faced candidates from two friendly parties, the PCT and the Club 2002-PUR. Tassoua was one of three FDN candidates to win seats in the election.

=== President of the Economic and Social Council (2009–present) ===
After serving as First Vice-President of the Economic and Social Council, Tassoua was appointed as its president by Sassou Nguesso on 18 September 2009. He succeeded Auguste-Célestin Gongarad Nkoua in that position. The council is a state body that is assigned the constitutional role of advising the government and Parliament on policy. It has 75 members and has three commissions separately dealing with economic, social, and cultural matters. Speaking to the press on 12 October 2009, Tassoua discussed his plans for improvements to the Council's work, mainly focusing on increasing the visibility of the institution through greater openness and accessibility.

The council opened its first session under Tassoua's leadership on 25 January 2010. The session was focused on employment and professional training; Tassoua particularly pointed to the problem of youth unemployment. He also stressed that Congo-Brazzaville had ample natural resources and that unemployment could be reduced through the exploitation of those resources. Tassoua reiterated that the Council had an important role to play in the nation's political life as "a center of reflection" assisting the decision-makers. The session ended on 5 February 2010. Tassoua said on the occasion that employment and educational issues needed to be addressed as a prerequisite for industrialization. He also noted the importance of a large operating budget for the Council so that it could work effectively, and he highlighted the importance of regional cooperation in anticipation of a planned meeting of the Union of Economic and Social Councils of Africa (UCESA).

Tassoua and Opimbat jointly led the FDN for three years. At the FDN's First Ordinary Congress on 2–3 May 2010, Opimbat was elected as the sole President of the FDN. The party congress also saw the establishment of the High Council of Dignitaries, a consultative body intended to advise the FDN Executive Bureau; Tassoua was included as one of its seven members, and it was installed on 1 June 2010. Tassoua chaired the consultative body.

As President of the Economic and Social Council, Tassoua made an official visit to China in March 2011. The FDN merged itself into the ruling PCT in July 2011, on the occasion of the PCT's Sixth Extraordinary Congress. At the congress, Tassoua was elected to the PCT's 471-member Central Committee.

According to Tassoua, armed men attacked his home in Impfondo on the night of 22–23 September 2014 intending to kill him, but he was not there at the time. He said that he intuitively felt he was in danger in Impfondo and therefore traveled to the village of Ibenga that night, although it was a risky journey. Speaking about the attack at a press conference on 15 October 2014, Tassoua stressed that he was "no longer interested in active politics" and said that he devoted his free time to farming.
