= Mamadou Camara =

Mamadou Camara may refer to:

- Mamadou Camara (politician) (born 1977), Malian politician
- Mamadou Camara (footballer, born 1988), French football defender
- Mamadou Camara (footballer, born 7 February 2001), Malian football forward for Laval
- Mamadou Camara (footballer, born 18 February 2001), Malian football midfielder for Torpedo-BelAZ Zhodino
- Mamadou Camara (footballer, born 2002), Senegalese football midfielder for RC Lens
- Mamadou Camara (footballer, born 2003), Senegalese football midfielder for Berkane

== See also ==
- Mamadouba Yamador Camara (born 1945), Guinean footballer
- Mamadou Kamara Dékamo (born 1949), Congolese politician
