= Democratic Republic of the Congo–Republic of the Congo relations =

Republic of the Congo–Democratic Republic of the Congo relations
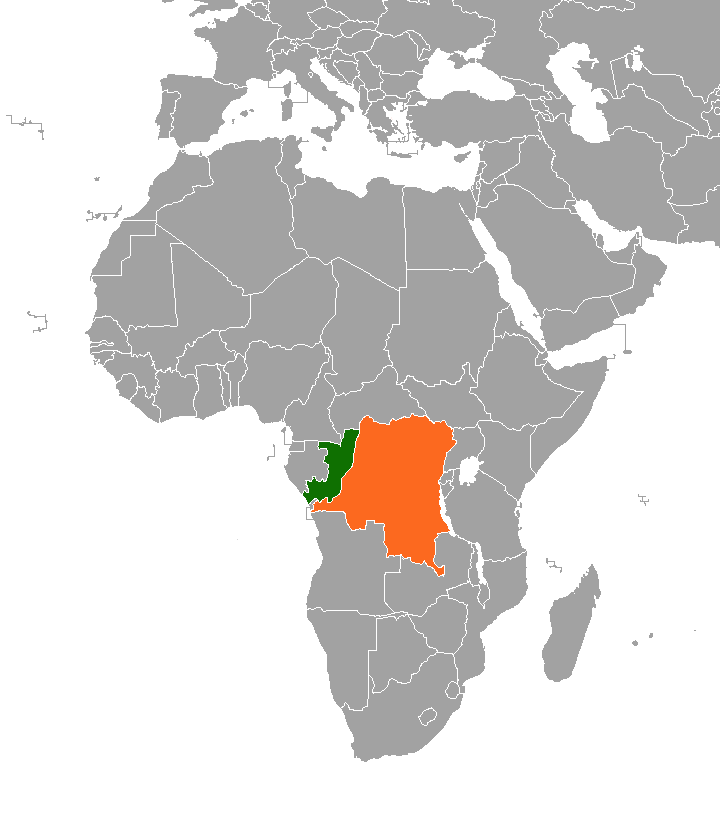
- Congo: DR Congo

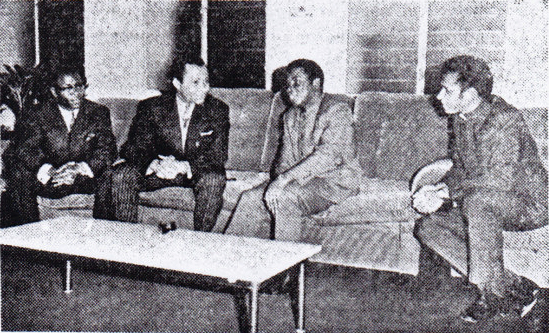
Officials from both countries meet in 1970

Relations between the Democratic Republic of the Congo and the Republic of the Congo were established in 1997. Both countries share the basin of the Congo River, from which both of their national names are derived. Their respective capitals, Kinshasa and Brazzaville, are located directly opposite each other on the banks of the Congo River. Aside from Rome and the Vatican City (an enclave within Italy), they are the two closest national capitals in the world which deeply intertwined with the history of the Kingdom of Kongo.

Both countries gained independence from France and Belgium such as the Belgian Congo and the French Congo (French Equatorial Africa) in 1960, during the Cold War, Mobutu ruled the DR Congo as Zaire (a US-backed capitalist pro-western dictatorship) until 1997, while Marien Ngouabi ruled the Congo as the People's Republic (a Soviet-backed communist state), which it remained until 1992, following the collapse of the USSR.

The total length of the border between the two countries is 1,775 km. Much of this segment of the border is poorly defined, and has been the subject of territorial disputes between the two countries.

Both states are Francophonie countries, having formerly been under the rule of Belgium (led by King Leopold II of the Belgians) and France (led by Pierre Savorgnan de Brazza) respectively, and both are members of the Organisation internationale de la Francophonie.

== History ==
=== Early relations ===
The Republic of the Congo and the Zaire gained independence in 1960 from France and Belgium, respectively. In the immediate aftermath of independence, both countries experienced political instability and frequent changes of government, which also affected their bilateral relations.

In the late 1960s, Brazzaville strengthened its socialist orientation, while in Kinshasa, Mobutu Sese Seko, who came to power through a military coup in 1965, established an authoritarian regime. Despite sharing a common language and close geographic proximity, the two countries maintained relations marked by periodic tension and mutual suspicion due to ideological differences.

=== Zaire period ===
The two countries were involved in diplomatic controversy (LICOPA affair) in August 1971 when DR Congo (then Zaire) declared the Republic of Congo's charge d'affaires to be a persona non grata. Despite the incident, relations between the two countries were not canceled and General/President Mobutu reiterated his commitment to brotherly relations in Central Africa.

On 22 August that same year, DR Congo's court sentenced LICOPA member Ando Ibarra to three years in prison and 10 years of expulsion from the country due to "violation of external security and spread of fake news".

=== Around 1997 ===
In 1997, the Mobutu regime in Zaire collapsed, and Laurent-Désiré Kabila came to power, restoring the country's name to the Democratic Republic of the Congo. The subsequent First and Second Congo War spread instability across Central Africa.

During this period, Republic of the Congo also experienced civil unrest. In the border regions, the movement of armed groups and the influx of refugees became significant challenges. While the two countries avoided direct military confrontation, border security and rebel activity were persistent sources of diplomatic tension.

Relations were soured during the Second Republic of the Congo Civil War as DR Congo supported Pascal Lissouba against Denis Sassou Nguesso, who eventually won the war.

=== 21st century ===
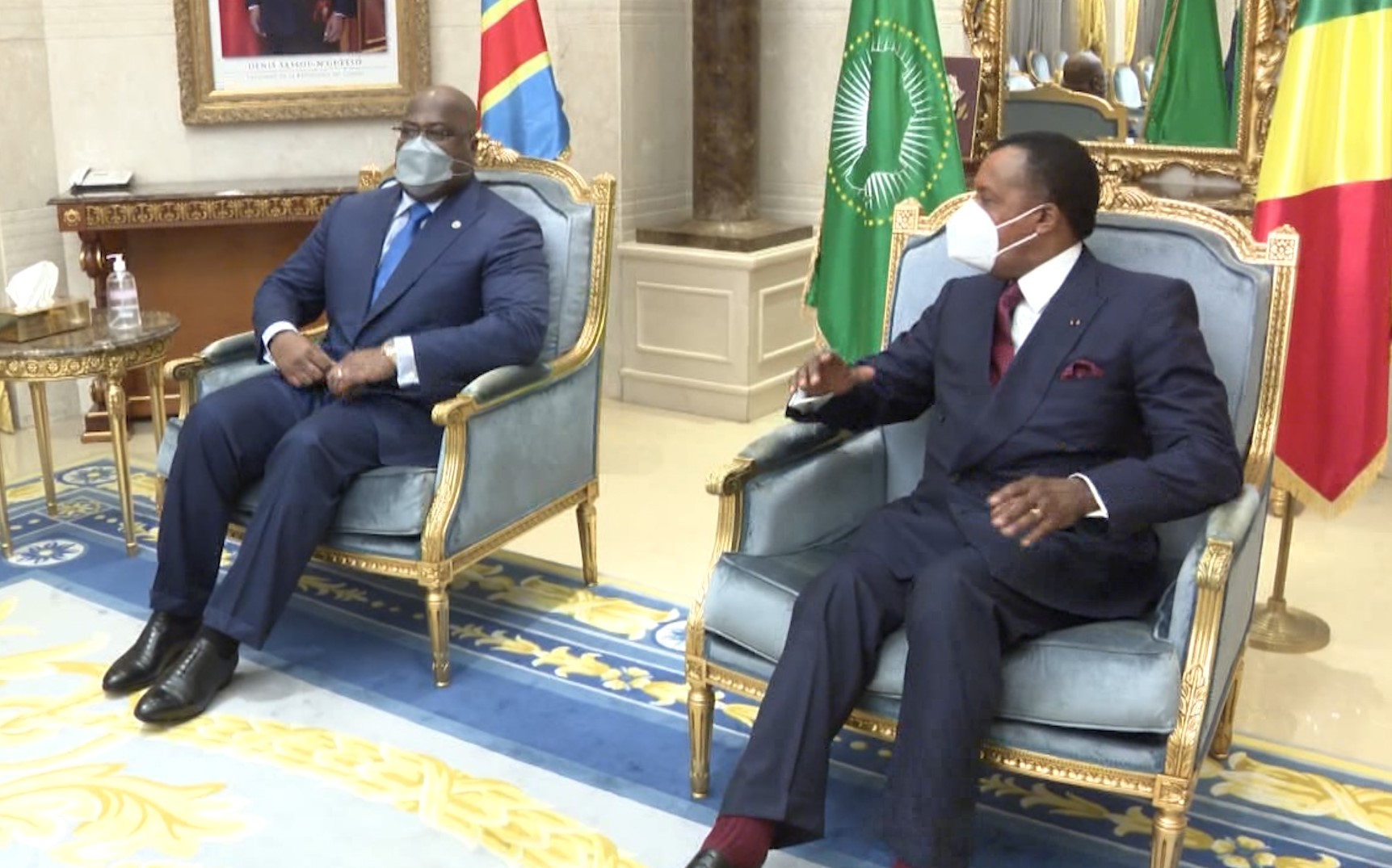
On July 16, 2020 in Brazzaville, meeting between the President of the Democratic Republic of the Congo Félix Tshisekedi and the President of the Republic of the Congo Denis Sassou-Nguesso

In the 21st century, relations between the two countries have been characterized by a coexistence of cooperation and tension. Due to economic and geographic interdependence, formal diplomatic relations have been maintained; however, security issues and political asylum have repeatedly emerged as points of contention.

In connection with the 2011 coup attempt in Congo-Kinshasa, diplomatic tensions escalated when Congo-Brazzaville refused to extradite leading opposition figure Faustin Munene, who was accused of plotting the coup. The government of then-President Joseph Kabila of the Democratic Republic of the Congo regarded the matter as an issue of national security.

Since then, the two countries have continued to experience intermittent disputes regarding border management, rebel group activity, and issues of political asylum. Nevertheless, dialogue channels aimed at ensuring regional stability and economic cooperation have been maintained.

On July 16, 2020, the President of the Democratic Republic of the Congo Félix Tshisekedi and the President of the Republic of the Congo Denis Sassou-Nguesso met in Brazzaville to discuss border security, health cooperation, and the strengthening of economic exchanges. Cooperation in response to the COVID-19 pandemic was notably one of the main topics addressed.

The two countries also expressed interest in strengthening cooperation in transport and trade to facilitate exchanges between the capitals located on either side of the Congo River. Infrastructure projects, including the construction of a bridge linking Kinshasa and Brazzaville, were discussed and are considered key elements of regional integration in Central Africa and economic development.

More recently, the need for increased cooperation in intelligence and security has been regularly raised in order to address security instability and the activities of armed groups in Central Africa. At the same time, the two states continue to coordinate their diplomatic positions within the African Union and other regional organizations, combining tension management with strengthened cooperation.

== Cultural relations ==
The Democratic Republic of the Congo and the Republic of the Congo share a common cultural, linguistic, and ethnic heritage rooted in the Congo River basin, and continue to maintain active cultural exchanges centered on music and festivals. Their respective capitals, Kinshasa and Brazzaville, face each other across the Congo River, facilitating vibrant cultural interaction.

Both countries are recognized as major centers of Congolese rumba and Soukous music. Kinshasa was designated a City of Music under the UNESCO Creative Cities Network in 2015, while Brazzaville hosts the Pan-African Music Festival (FESPAM).

In addition, people in both countries commonly speak Lingala and French, and continue to influence each other in the fields of music and popular culture.

== Economic relations ==
The Democratic Republic of the Congo and the Republic of the Congo cooperate in promoting regional economic integration and trade as member states of the Economic Community of Central African States (ECCAS).

The two countries are jointly pursuing the Kinshasa–Brazzaville road corridor and the Brazzaville–Kinshasa Bridge project, which includes a road and railway link connecting Brazzaville and Kinshasa. The project is intended to create the first permanent land transport connection between the capitals of the two countries and to facilitate cross-border trade and regional economic integration.

According to the African Development Bank (AfDB), the project includes the construction of a road-and-rail bridge across the Congo River as well as connecting access roads. Upon completion, it is expected to facilitate the movement of goods and people between the two countries and contribute to regional integration in Central Africa.

== See also ==
- Foreign relations of the Democratic Republic of the Congo
- Foreign relations of the Republic of the Congo
- Democratic Republic of the Congo–Republic of the Congo border
