= Eurométropole =

French Eurométropole, anglicised Eurometropolis, may refer to:

- Eurometropolis Lille–Kortrijk–Tournai, combined metropolitan area of Lille in France and Kortrijk and Tournai in Belgium
- Eurométropole de Strasbourg, urban administrative area around Strasbourg, France
- Eurométropole de Metz, urban administrative area around Metz, France
- Tour de l'Eurométropole, 2012–2021 name for the Circuit Franco-Belge cycle race in the vicinity of Tournai

== See also ==
- Métropole, a class of French urban administrative area
- Métropole Européenne de Lille, the French urban administrative area within the Eurometropolis Lille–Kortrijk–Tournai
