= Africa-Italy Excellence Awards =

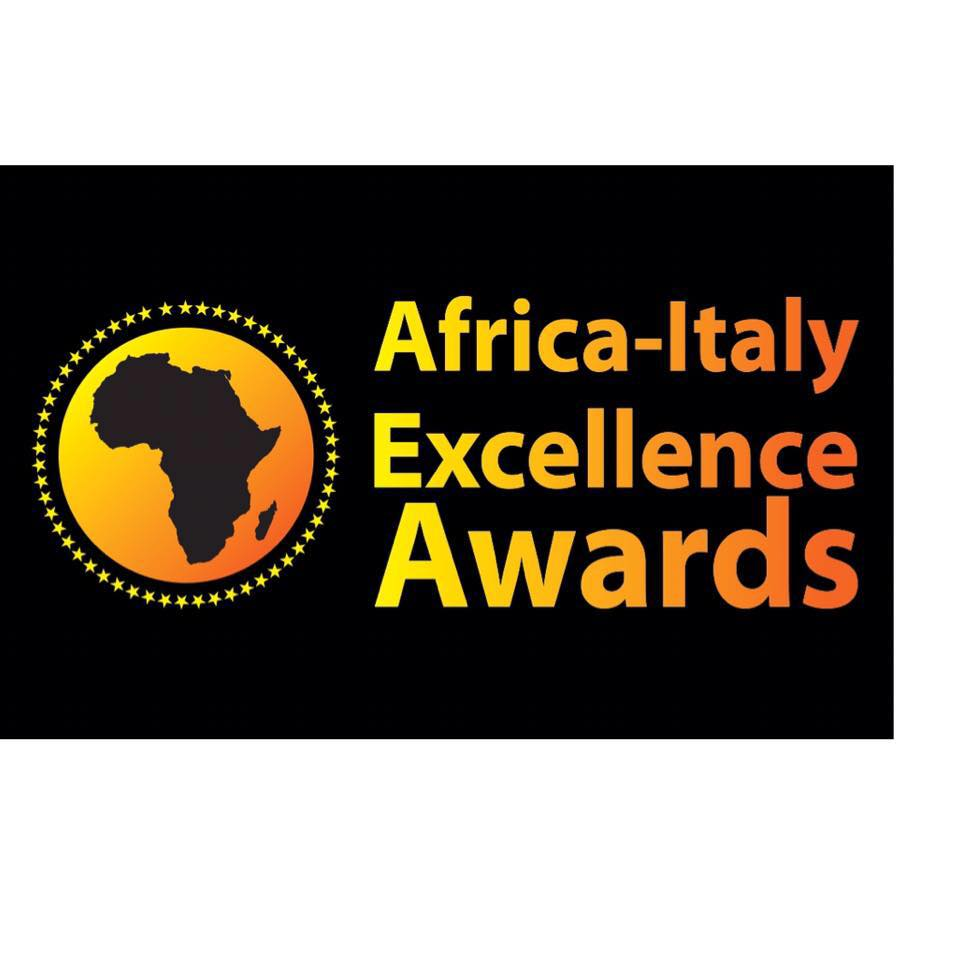
- Founder: Freda Cooper
- Founded at: Italy
- Type: Non-Profit Organization
- Location: Bergamo
- Affiliations: Divino Friends Organization

The Africa-Italy Excellence Awards (AIEA), formerly known as Ghana-Italy Excellence Awards, is a cultural-diversity oriented award scheme aimed at celebrating exemplary African individuals for their significant difference in the African community in Italy and other European countries. The event brings to light notable Africans that have genuinely excelled in various spheres of life, hence contributing to the advancement of Africa from the diaspora. The Africa-Italy Excellence Awards is organized and powered by Divino Friends Organization.

== Award Scheme ==
Africa-Italy Excellence Awards (AIEA) was initially founded as Ghana-Italy Excellence Awards in 2008, with the maiden event organized in 2011 in Brescia, Italy. The maiden event was preceded by a similar event of such nature by the then Ghana Ambassador to Italy, H.E. Agyei Amoama, in 2007, after which it took on the brand name, "Ghana-Italy Excellence Awards", prior to the event in 2011. In the third occasion of the event in 2013, the award was re-branded to "Africa-Italy Excellence Awards" (AIEA) in order to extended the celebratory honour to other deserving African as well.

The Africa-Italy Excellence Awards (AIEA) was officially endorsed in November 2013 by the European Parliament signed by President Martin Schulz, Roma Capitale, Brescia Municipality, and UNAR (National Office Against Racial Discrimination of the Presidency of the Council of Ministers). It has also been endorsed by His Excellency Mamadou Kamara Dékamo, Dean of the African Diplomatic Corps in Italy. The award does not only celebrates diversity, multiculturalism, and the achievements of the contemporary and historical African-Diaspora communities in Italy and Europe, but also pays tribute to the success of Africans across all walks of life, emphasizing achievement and highlighting inspirational role models in the fields of: Humanitarian, Arts and Culture, Business, Sports, and Entertainment. The AIEA seeks to address a broad spectrum of issues affecting the modern African.

== How the Award Scheme Operates ==
Each year, a committee responsible for reviewing the candidates for the AIEA is established and nomination of awardees are called for about 12 month prior to AIEA ceremony. The nominations are accepted based on an internal vetting process. The AIEA committee considers the activities of prospective nominees 12 months from date of nomination acceptance which makes up the first evaluation. A ballot by the committee is cast after which, the profile of qualified nominees are made public and also reviewed by an established Legal Affairs Committee composed of renowned experts in the fields of: Immigration, Economics and Social work. The Legal committee holds 55% of the votes and 45% is left with the general public.

== Winners of the AIEA ==
- H.E. Christopher Norman Russell Prentice
- Prof. Mariano Pavanello
- Hon. Giusi Nicolini
- Dr Perviss Kwame Kuwornu
- H.E. Eric Tonye Aworabhi
- Edirissa Sanneh
- Taiye Selasi
- H.E. Hassan Abouyoub
- Madi Sakande
- Ray Foundation
- H.E. Carla Elisa Mucav
- Kofi Osei Bonsu
- Bretuoba Quaku Agyemang
- Fabio Mandela
- Thomas Andreaw
- New Tecnowind Menssana Basket
- Malu Mpasinkatu
- H.E. Evelyn Anita Strokes-Hayford
- Dr. Kossi A. Komla-Ebri
- Hon. Cècile Kashetu Kyenge
- H.E. Mamadou Kamara Dekamo
- Ottobre Africano
- Abdou Kader Alassane
- Desiree Diao
- E.A.Phography
- Obed Duku
- Daniel Adomako,
- H.E. Nomatemba Tambo
- Nana Yaw Badu Duku
- Aubrey Adofo Assiedu
- H.E. Mulgeta Alemseged Gessese
- Harriet K. Mugera
- Zuzanne M. Diku
- Jean Baptiseste Sourow
- Martha Ahlijah Frimpong
- Samuel Kennedy Agyei Takyi
- Reggie Tagoe
- Stephen Ogongo
- Roland Agambre
- Jean Leonard Touadi
- Alima Moro
- Victor Emeka Okeadu
- Gloria Hooper
- Fred Kojo Kuwornu
- Jean Cloude Mbede
