= Bétou Airport =

- IATA: BTB; ICAO: FCOT

Summary
- Airport type: Public
- Serves: Bétou, Republic of Congo
- Elevation AMSL: 1,168 ft / 356 m
- Coordinates: 3°03′28″N 18°30′55″E

Map
- Location in the Republic of the Congo

Runways
| Direction | Length | | Surface |
| Direction | m | ft | Surface |
|---|---|---|---|
| 08/26 | 1,000 | 3,281 | Dirt |
- Source: GCM Google Maps

Bétou Airport (IATA: BTB, ICAO: FCOT) is an airport within the town of Bétou in the Likouala Department, Republic of the Congo. The runway also serves as part of the road leading westward out of town.

Bétou is on the Ubangi River, the border with the Democratic Republic of the Congo. East approach and departure will cross the river into the DRC.

== See also ==
- List of airports in the Republic of the Congo
- Transport in the Republic of the Congo
