= New Democratic Forces =

The New Democratic Forces (French: Forces démocratiques nouvelles) was a political party in Congo-Brazzaville from 2007 to 2011.

Seven parties, which were formerly members of the United Democratic Forces (FDU), agreed to merge to form the FDN on 27 March 2007. They were joined by an additional eight parties and political associations on 10 April, resulting in a total of 15: ACOSS, the URN, the UNDP, the RDPC, Parrreco, PR-Le National, the RP, the MURC, the FNDP, CASAP, the ADP, Poucouna, the PPES, the PNDC, and the PPDS. One of them—the Union for National Recovery (URN), led by Gabriel Bokilo—subsequently withdrew from the agreement. Like the FDU, the FDN supports President Denis Sassou Nguesso.

In the immediate aftermath of its formation, the FDN was headed by a collective of seven presidents. It then held its constitutive congress in Brazzaville on 19–21 April 2007. This congress initiated a two-year transitional process in the development of the party. The congress elected a National Council with 415 members, a National Executive Bureau with seven members, a Permanent Secretariat with 41 members, and a Control and Evaluation Commission with seven members. The National Executive Bureau was jointly headed by Léon Alfred Opimbat and Jean-Marie Tassoua, while Emile Aurélien Bongouandé was chosen as coordinator of the Permanent Secretariat. In addition to Opimba and Tassou, the party's co-presidents, four vice-presidents were chosen. On behalf of the new party, Opimbat and Tassoua signed an electoral agreement with Sassou Nguesso's Congolese Labour Party (PCT) on 15 May 2007.

In the parliamentary election held on 24 June and 5 August 2007, the party won three out of 137 seats: Jean-Marie Tassoua in Dougou constituency (in Likouala Region), Charlotte Opimbat in the first constituency of Poto-Poto (in Brazzaville), and Léon Alfred Opimbat in Mbomo constituency (in Cuvette West Region).

The FDN signed an agreement to join the Rally of the Presidential Majority (RMP) coalition on 27 March 2008. It subsequently merged itself into the Congolese Labour Party (PCT) on 19 July 2011.
