= Victor Promontorio =

Congolese jurist (1912–1973)

President of the Bar of the Democratic Republic of the Congo
- President: Mobutu Sese Seko

Personal details
- Born: 29 July 1912 Kintambo, Léopoldville, Belgian Congo
- Died: 1973
- Party: Assoreco
- Education: Catholic University of Leuven

Victor Promontorio, or Seya Tshibangu (29 July 1912 – 1973) was a Congolese jurist and politician. In 1935, he became the first Congolese individual to graduate from university.

== Early life and career ==
Victor Promontorio was born in 1912 in Kintambo, municipality of Léopoldville in the Belgian Congo, to an Italian father and a Congolese mother. When his mother died in 1919, his father, a well-known merchant at the time, sent him to Brussels, Belgium, where he studied at the Saint-Louis Institute. In July 1935, he obtained his Doctorate in Law at the University of Leuven, thereby becoming the first Congolese university graduate. In February 1936, he started his career as a lawyer at the Brussels bar, until 1960.

== Legal and political career ==
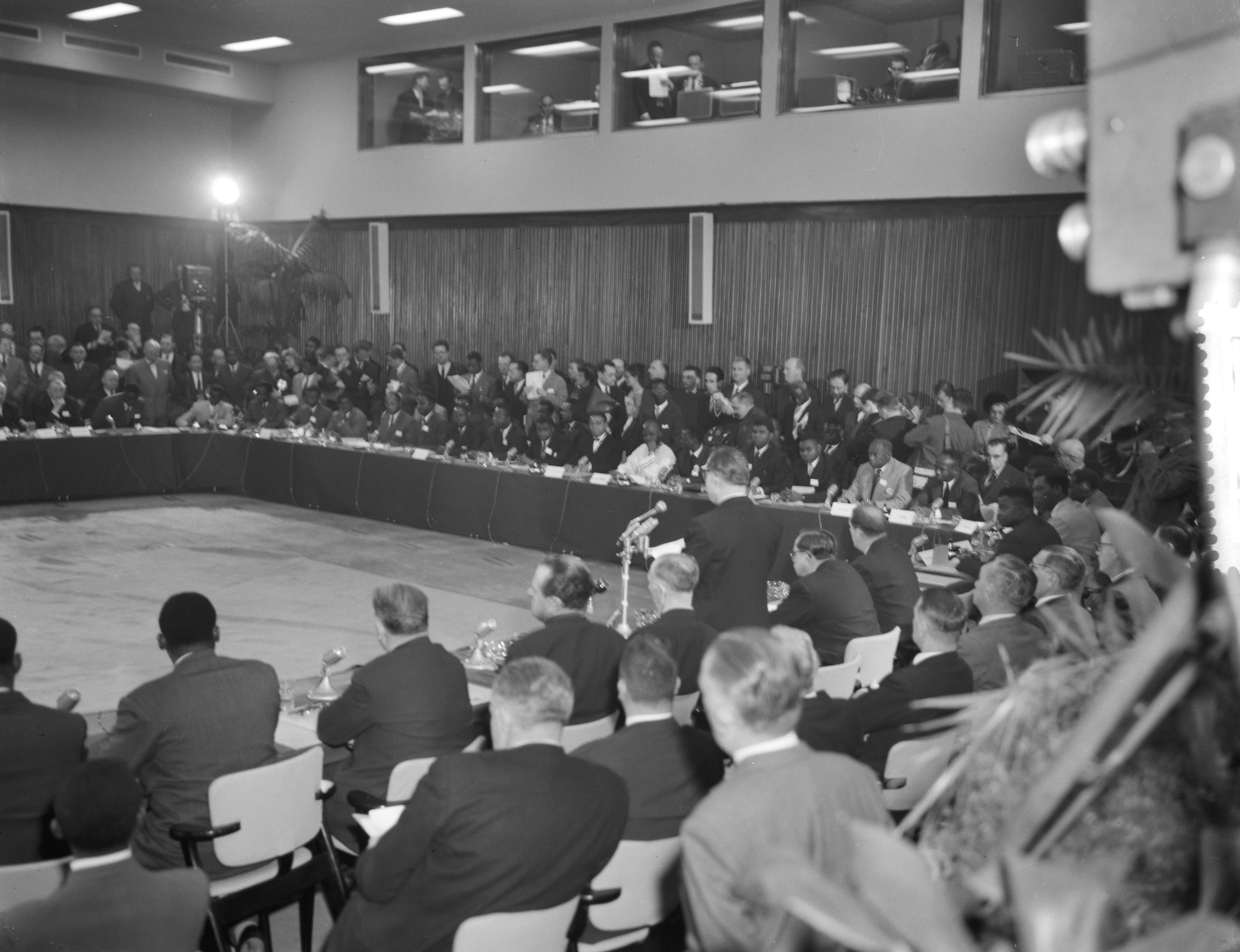
Opening meeting of the Belgo-Congolese Round Table Conference on 20 January 1960

In 1960, two Belgo-Congolese Round Table Conferences were organised in order to discuss the road towards Congolese independence. The Congolese side was represented by the different political parties of the country such as Patrice Lumumba's Mouvement National Congolais and Joseph Kasa-Vubu's ABAKO. Promontorio became a political adviser to Jean Bolikango's Association des Ressortisants du Haut-Congo (ASSORECO) during the Economic Roundtable Conference.

After the Conference, Promontorio moved to Congo, where he became a senator for the Équateur Province with the support of the National Unity Party, which absorbed Assoreco. When the Léopoldville Bar, first Bar in the independent Congo, was established, Promontorio became the first President of the Léopoldville Bar.

Promontorio was reelected as a senator for the Moyen-Congo Province during the legislative election in 1965. As a lawyer, he pleaded for Kudia Kubanza, Auditor General who was accused during the LICOPA affair. Shortly thereafter, he returned to Europe.

== Publications ==
- Promontorio, Victor (1965). Les institutions dans la constitutions congolaise (in French). Concordia.
