= FCOT =

FCOT may refer to:

- Bétou Airport
- Farnborough College of Technology
