= Impfondo =

Town and commune in the Republic of the Congo

- Town and Commune
- Location in the Republic of the Congo
- Coordinates: 1°37′7″N 18°03′44″E
- Country: Republic of the Congo
- Department: Likouala Department
- District: Impfondo District
- Commune: Impfondo
- Elevation: 326 m (1,070 ft)

Population (2023 census)
  - Total: 38,240

Impfondo is a town and a commune in the northeastern Republic of the Congo lying on the Oubangui River. It is home to an airport and is linked by river barge to Brazzaville and to Bangui. It is the administrative centre of the Likouala Department and the Impfondo District.

== History ==
Historically called Desbordesville, Impfondo is usually a stopping point on the way to Bangui by barge. It is a frontier kind of place, the last vestige of what could be called civilisation in an area overwhelmed by dense forest swamps and small villages. Rumours abound of a police force and sets of soldiers more corrupt than in other parts of the Congo, probably due to its remoteness, in addition to being so close to the Democratic Republic of Congo over the river. Soldiers from DR Congo have been known to cross and harass the population on occasion, making people here more on edge than usual. The western side of the Congo River in the Likouala is home to refugee camps, though as the conflict in DR Congo subsides, they should be making their way back across the river. Due to persistent flooding and proximity to the border with the DRC, Impfondo is considered a high-risk zone for Ebola.

To the west of Impfondo lies the Lac Tele area of the tropical jungle. This area is one of the least developed regions of Africa, with stretches of barely touched equatorial rain forest and wetlands stretching for hundreds of kilometres. Wilderness and animal concerns take precedence over the daily lives of people, and by some accounts, the Congo's north is the 'last great wilderness of Africa'.

Large animals are still found across the area, including lowland gorillas, hippopotamus, forest elephants, crocodiles and numerous monkeys. The wetlands are also home to several hundred bird species, numerous snake species, and many as yet discovered aspects of the region.

There is a highly undeveloped dirt trail road heading north from Impfondo along the river into the Central African Republic.

== Climate ==
Impfondo has a tropical monsoon climate (Am) according to the Köppen climate classification.

Climate data for Impfondo (1991-2020)
Month	Jan	Feb	Mar	Apr	May	Jun	Jul	Aug	Sep	Oct	Nov	Dec	Year
Mean daily maximum °C (°F)	31.6 (88.9)	32.8 (91.0)	33.0 (91.4)	32.4 (90.3)	32.0 (89.6)	30.9 (87.6)	29.8 (85.6)	30.0 (86.0)	30.6 (87.1)	30.8 (87.4)	30.6 (87.1)	31.1 (88.0)	31.3 (88.3)
Daily mean °C (°F)	25.4 (77.7)	26.4 (79.5)	26.9 (80.4)	26.5 (79.7)	26.3 (79.3)	25.6 (78.1)	25.2 (77.4)	25.0 (77.0)	24.8 (76.6)	25.0 (77.0)	25.3 (77.5)	25.5 (77.9)	25.7 (78.3)
Mean daily minimum °C (°F)	20.3 (68.5)	21.4 (70.5)	21.9 (71.4)	22.0 (71.6)	22.0 (71.6)	21.9 (71.4)	21.2 (70.2)	21.1 (70.0)	21.1 (70.0)	21.2 (70.2)	21.2 (70.2)	—	22.0 (71.6)
Average precipitation mm (inches)	47.1 (1.85)	83.5 (3.29)	132.6 (5.22)	154.7 (6.09)	144.2 (5.68)	126.4 (4.98)	142.2 (5.60)	153.6 (6.05)	193.3 (7.61)	187.6 (7.39)	161.2 (6.35)	71.8 (2.83)	1,598.2 (62.94)
Source: NOAA

== Administration ==
The district of Impfondo is divided into districts including Dongou, Liranga and Bétou, villages located on the right bank of the Congo River and the Ubangi River. The town of Impfondo has eight neighborhoods: Moungoungui (01), Tolingana (02), Bakandi (03), town center (04), Angola libre (05), Tossangana (05), Bohona (06), Gangania (07) and Kombola (08).
