= Bétou District =

Coordinates: 3.062°N 18.518°E

Bétou
- District
- Interactive map of Bétou
- Country: Republic of the Congo
- Region: Likouala Department

Area
  - Total: 1,390 sq mi (3,599 km^{2})

Population (2023 census)
  - Total: 126,956
  - Density: 91.36/sq mi (35.28/km^{2})
- Time zone: UTC+1 (GMT +1)

Bétou is a district in the Likouala Department of Republic of the Congo.
