= Abidjan–Lagos Corridor =

Abidjan–Lagos Mégalopole Abidjan–Lagos
- Transborder agglomeration in Africa
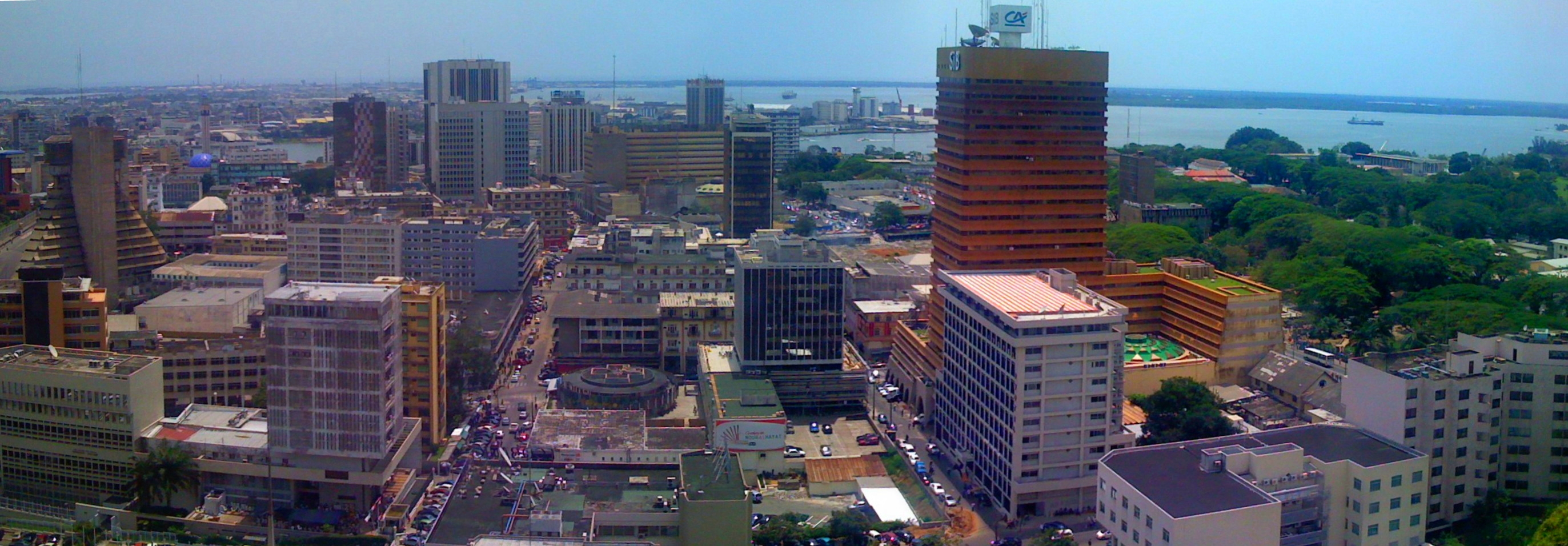
- Abidjan, Ivory Coast
- Nickname: West African Megalopolis
- Location within Africa
- Coordinates: 5.5°N 0°E
- Countries: Ivory Coast; Ghana; Benin; Togo; Nigeria
- Largest city: Lagos (14,368,332)

Population (2016)
  - Total: 27,000,000
- Time zone: GMT (UTC±00:00) — Côte d'Ivoire, Ghana, Togo; WAT (UTC+01:00) — Benin and Nigeria

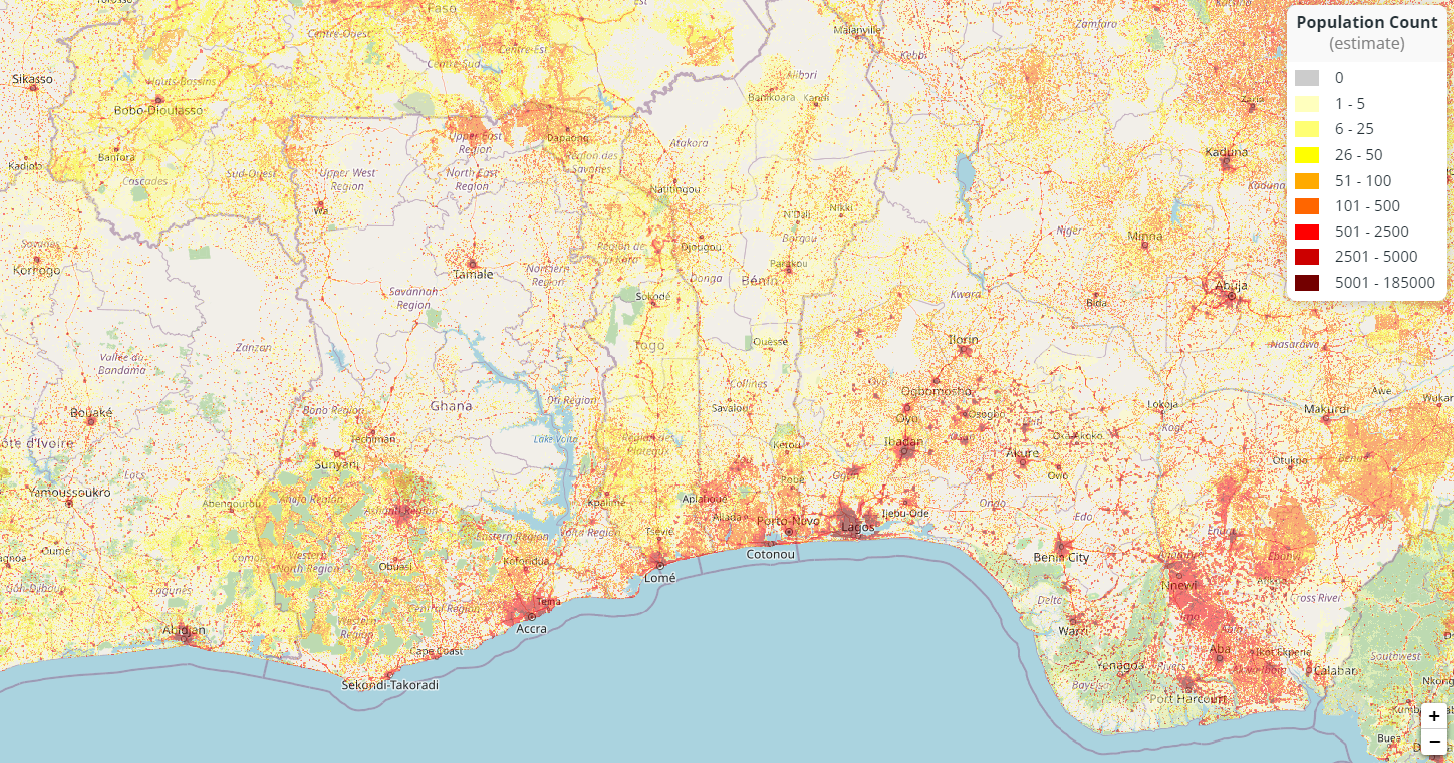
Population density in Western Africa (2021)

The Abidjan–Lagos Corridor, also known as the Abidjan–Lagos Megalopolis, is an emerging transnational megalopolis on the coast of southern West Africa. It stretches from Abidjan to Lagos, crossing five independent states (Côte d'Ivoire, Ghana, Togo, Benin, and Nigeria) from west to east, and includes three political capitals and many regional economic centers. The corridor has a length of approximately 965 kilometers (600 miles). Within the megalopolis, a significant portion of West Africa's economic output is generated, and cities within the corridor are among the most economically developed of their respective countries, for which agglomeration effects and access to the Atlantic Ocean are responsible. The population within the region is experiencing rapid growth, and nearly 50 million people are expected to live within the corridor by 2035. According to projections, by the end of the 21st century, the region could become the largest urban region with continuous settlement in the world, then with up to half a billion inhabitants.

After the decolonization of Africa, politically independent states emerged in West Africa and urban growth accelerated. Migrants moved from the interior to the more developed coastal areas, for example in Ghana to the region around Accra or in Nigeria to the metropolitan region of Lagos. Rapid urban growth led to the merging of previously independent settlements into large agglomerations with an economic division of labor. This occurred first domestically and later in transnational regions (e.g., between Lagos and neighboring Benin). However, urban growth was largely unplanned and led to severe urban sprawl, as little investment was made in the construction of multi-story housing. Future investment needs are therefore very high.

Due to the linguistic, cultural and political differences between the countries located in the corridor, the region's economic potential has not yet been fully exploited. There has been little alignment of standards and construction of common infrastructure, and even within the countries, transportation links are often unreliable.

== Cities ==
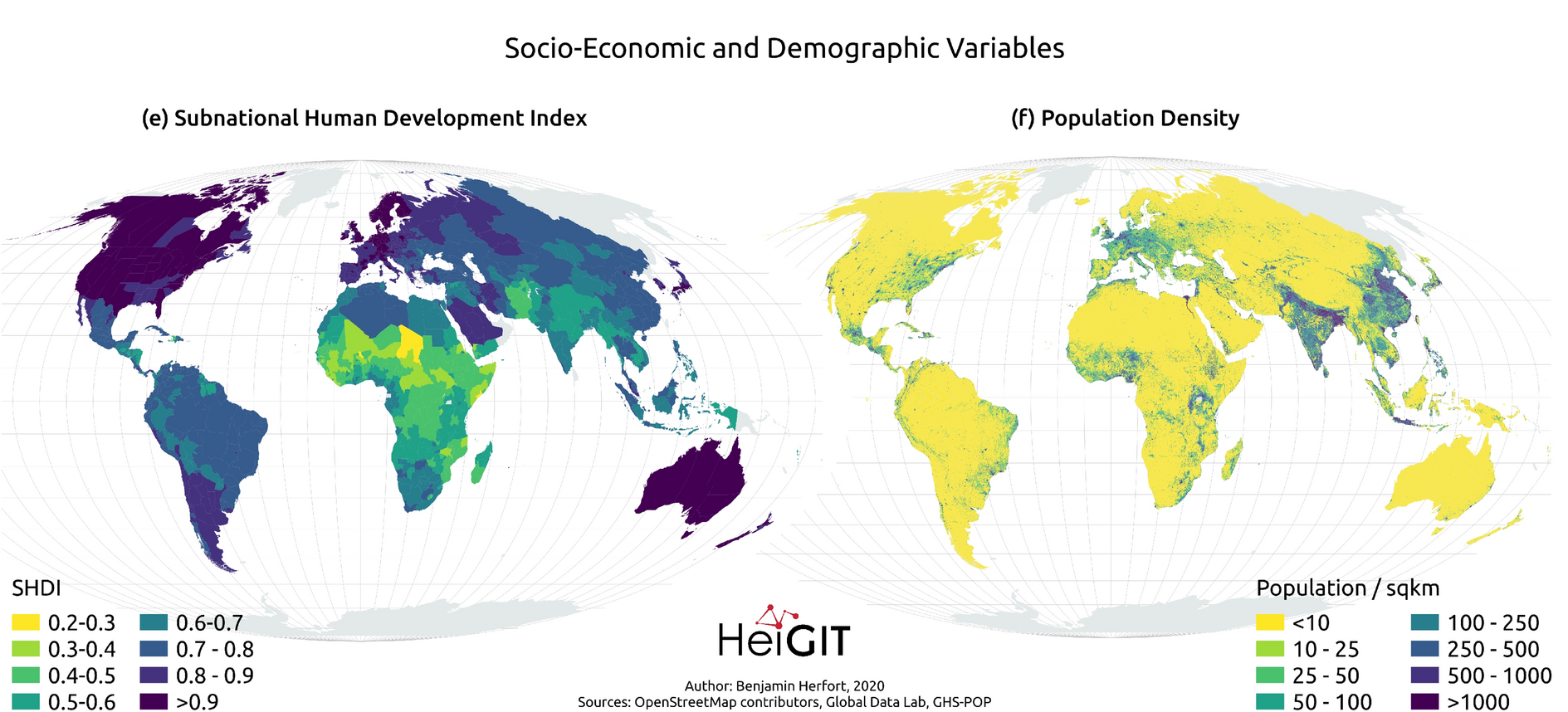
Maps of Subnational Human Development Index and population density

Listed from west to east.

City	Country	Population (2020)	Principal languages	Picture
Abidjan	Ivory Coast	5,516,000	French, Abidjan French, Attié, Baoulé, Bété, Wobé, Ebrié	
Sekondi-Takoradi	Ghana	1,078,000	Fante, English	
Cape Coast	Ghana	189,925 (2010)	Fante, English	
Accra	Ghana	2,557,000	English, Twi, Dagbani, Ga, Akan	
Lomé	Togo	2,200,000	French, Ewe	
Abomey-Calavi	Benin	1,315,000	French, Fon	
Cotonou	Benin	2,000,000	French, Fon, Yoruba	
Porto-Novo	Benin	264,320 (2013)	French, Fon, Yoruba	
Lagos	Nigeria	27,315,824	English, Nigerian Pidgin, Yoruba	

== Abidjan-Lagos Highway ==
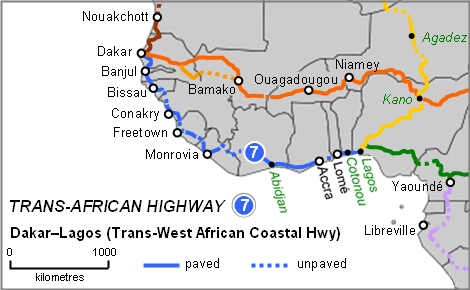
Existing Dakar-Lagos Highway

Construction of a highway route from Abidjan to Lagos (Abidjan-Lagos Highway) is scheduled to begin in 2026, with completion targeted for 2030. The project, spanning 1,028 km (639 mi), is expected to cost $15.6 billion and increase regional economic integration. The African Development Bank is involved in the financing. So far, the Dakar-Lagos Highway forms the main transport axis in the region.

== Airports ==
- Cadjehoun Airport, Cotonou
- Félix-Houphouët-Boigny International Airport, Abidjan
- Accra International Airport, Accra
- Lomé–Tokoin International Airport, Lomé
- Murtala Muhammed International Airport, Lagos
- Takoradi Airport, Sekondi-Takoradi

== Metro systems ==
- Abidjan Metro
- Lagos Metro

== Ports ==
- Port of Abidjan
- Port of Cotonou
- Port of Lagos
- Port of Lomé
- Port of Tema
- Port of Takoradi
