= Mamadou Kamara Dékamo =

Republic of the Congo politician (born 1949)

Mamadou Kamara Dékamo (born 8 January 1949) is a Congolese political figure and diplomat. He is Roving Ambassador to the President of the Republic since march 2023. He was Congo-Brazzaville's Ambassador to Germany since 2017 to 2022, to Italy since 2000 to 2017 and was previously Minister of Health in the government of Congo-Brazzaville from 1997 to 1999. On October 14, 1998, he was appointed to the rank of Commander in the Congolese Order of Merit by presidential decree.

== Political career ==
Kamara Dékamo was born in Ngondzia, located in the north of Congo-Brazzaville. After working at the Ministry of Planning, he was Director of Studies and Planning at the Ministry of Territorial Administration from 1976 to 1978, then Director-General of Youth from 1979 to 1984 and Director-General of SEP Development from 1984 to 1992. He became a member of the Political Bureau of the Congolese Labour Party (PCT) in 1992, and he was elected to the National Assembly as a PCT candidate from the Poto-Poto section of Brazzaville in the 1992 parliamentary election. On 25 December 1992, he was appointed as Minister of Communication, Posts, and Telecommunications, as well as Government Spokesman, in the power-sharing government of Prime Minister Claude Antoine Dacosta, which was to serve until a new election was held. In the May–June 1993 parliamentary election, Kamara Dékamo was re-elected to the National Assembly from Poto-Poto. Amidst the period of violence that followed the election, he condemned the Presidential Tendency (composed of supporters of President Pascal Lissouba) for, in his view, seeking to "install a dictatorship".

Following the June–October 1997 civil war, in which Lissouba was ousted and Denis Sassou Nguesso returned to power, Kamara Dékamo was appointed as Minister of Health and Population on 2 November 1997. He held that post for a little over a year before being replaced by Léon-Alfred Opimbat on 12 January 1999. He was subsequently appointed as Ambassador to Italy and took up that post on 21 February 2000; concurrently, he served as Permanent Representative to the United Nations organizations based in Rome: the Food and Agriculture Organization (since 15 March 2000), the International Fund for Agricultural Development, and the World Food Programme.

Kamara Dékamo has been involved in a political dispute with some leading figures in the PCT, including Ambroise Noumazalaye (who was Secretary-General of the PCT until his death in November 2007) as well as Henri Djombo and Gilbert Djombo-Bomondjo, who supported Noumazalaye. In November 2007, Henri Djombo, the Minister of Forest Economics, published an open letter addressed to the people of Likouala Region, in which he alleged that, beginning in 2005, Kamara Dékamo had "deserted his post as ambassador to lead political campaigns in Brazzaville and Likouala". Djombo accused Kamara Dékamo and others from Likouala of slander and said that they were involved in an assassination plot that targeted Djombo.

By 2009, Kamara Dékamo was the Dean of the African Diplomatic Corps in Italy. When Teodoro Obiang Nguema, the President of Equatorial Guinea, visited Rome in November–December 2010, Kamara Dékamo led the African diplomatic corps in greeting Obiang and offered warm praise. He also condemned those who had criticized Obiang's offer of money to UNESCO to establish a prize for science.

Kamara Dékamo was among the dignitaries present for the canonization of Pope John XXIII and Pope John Paul II at the Vatican on 27 April 2014.

In May 2017, President Sassou Nguesso moved Kamara Dékamo to the post of Ambassador to Germany.
