= Charlotte Opimbat =

Congolese politician

Charlotte Opimbat, née Mboundza Moke Ekotikambi is a Congolese Party of Labour (PCT) politician in Congo-Brazzaville. She is the Deputy in the National Assembly for the second Poto-Poto constituency, Brazzaville Department.

== Life ==
After primary schooling and secondary schooling in Poto-Poto, she left Congo in 1978 to study at the Lycée Salvador Allende, Hérouville-Saint-Clair, France. In 1982 she entered the University of Caen Normandy, graduating in economic and social administration in 1985. She then studied for a masters at the François Rabelais University of Tours.

At the age of 28 she married the politician Leon-Alfred Opimbat. The couple have five children.

In the 2007 parliamentary election, Opimbat was elected for Poto-Poto's first constituency, standing for the New Democratic Forces (FDN) party. She was re-elected for Poto-Poto's second constituency in the 2012 parliamentary election, and elected First Quaestor.

In 2013 Opimbat announced the construction of five new boreholes in Poto-Poto, to enable residents to draw water for free. In July 2014 she donated tracksuits to senior citizens in her constituency. In July 2015 she again gave clothing to the elderly as protection from the cold. She was again returned for Poto-Poto 2 in the 2017 parliamentary election.

Opimbat has served as a vice-president of the Congolese women parliamentary group.

In 2020 the first lady, Antoinette Sassou Nguesso, was reported to support Opimbat in her candidacy to be Mayor of Brazzaville.
