= Enyellé =

- Location in Republic of the Congo
- Coordinates: 2°48′43″N 18°0′49″E
- Country: Republic of the Congo
- Department: Likouala
- District: Enyellé
- Elevation: 361 m (1,184 ft)

Population (2023)
  - Total: 14,674

Enyellé is a village in northern Republic of the Congo, serving as the seat of the Enyellé District in the Likouala Department.
