= Transborder agglomeration =

Urban area that extends into two or more countries (or dependent territories)

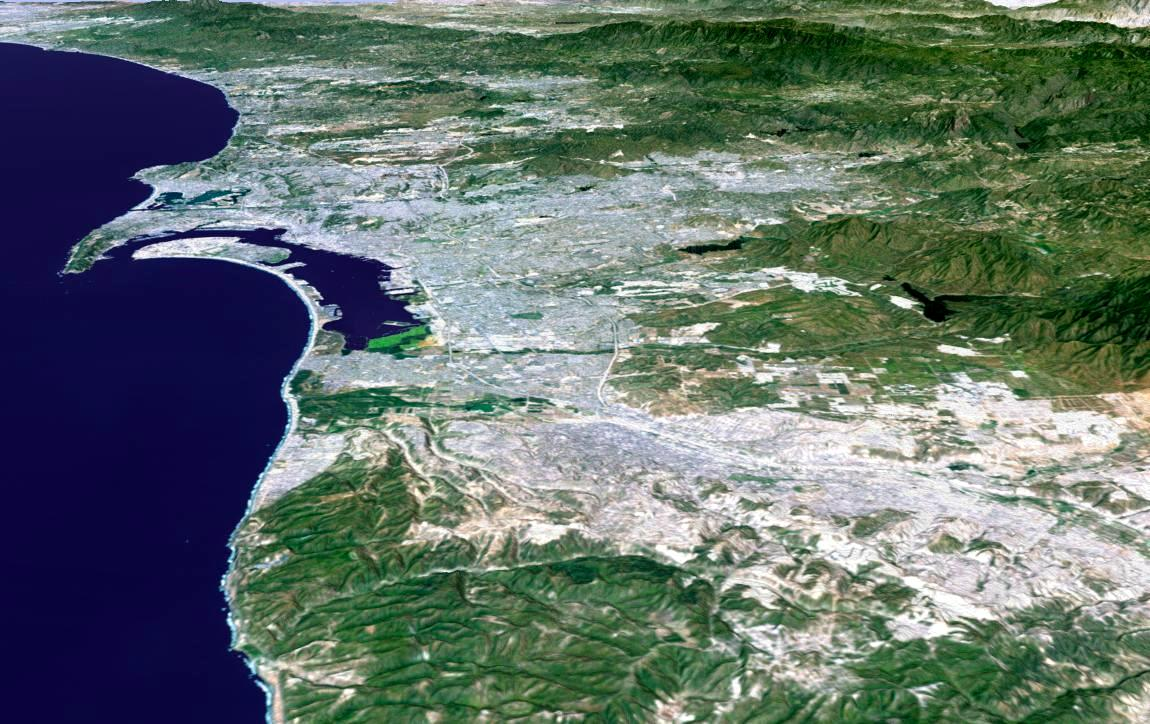
San Diego–Tijuana is an urban agglomeration across the Mexico–United States border.

A transborder agglomeration is an urban agglomeration or conurbation that extends into multiple sovereign states and/or dependent territories. It includes city-states that agglomerate with their neighbouring countries.

== List of transborder agglomerations ==
=== Africa ===
Main municipalities	Countries	Total population
Kinshasa–Brazzaville	Democratic Republic of the Congo /Republic of the Congo	19,547,463
Bukavu–Cyangugu	Democratic Republic of the Congo / Rwanda	1,200,000
Goma–Gisenyi	Democratic Republic of the Congo / Rwanda	756,323
Abidjan–Lagos	Côte d'Ivoire / Ghana / Togo / Benin / Nigeria	27,000,000
Lomé–Aflao	Togo / Ghana	1,544,206
N'Djamena–Kousséri	Chad / Cameroon	1,694,819
Ceuta-Fnideq	Spain / Morocco	161,658

=== Asia ===
Main municipalities	Countries	Total population
Astara and Astara	Iran–Azerbaijan	100,000
Khorramshahr–Abadan–Basra	Iran–Iraq	2,000,000
Dhahran–Jubail–Manama	Saudi Arabia–Bahrain	2,000,000
Tashkent–Saryagash	Uzbekistan–Kazakhstan	3,000,000
Fergana and Kyzyl-Kiya	Uzbekistan–Kyrgyzstan	300,000
Qorasuv and Kara-Suu	Uzbekistan–Kyrgyzstan	40,000
Heihe–Blagoveshchensk	China–Russia	400,000
Dandong–Sinuiju	China–North Korea	1,000,000
Greater Bay Area (Guangzhou–Dongguan–Shenzhen–Hong Kong–Macau	China–Hong Kong–Macau	71,200,000
Sijori Growth Triangle (Singapore–Johor Bahru–Batam–Bintan)	Singapore–Malaysia–Indonesia	9,000,000
Padang Besar and Padang Besar	Malaysia–Thailand	20,000
Vientiane–Nong Khai	Laos–Thailand	900,000
Al Ain and Al-Buraimi	United Arab Emirates–Oman	968,589
Savannakhet–Mukdahan	Laos–Thailand	200,000

=== Europe ===
Main municipalities	Countries	Total population
Øresund Region (Greater Copenhagen and Malmö)	Denmark–Sweden	3,964,522
Haparanda–Tornio	Sweden–Finland	32,000
Pello (Pello, Övertorneå and Pello, Finland)	Sweden–Finland	4,500
Karesuando–Karesuvanto	Sweden–Finland	500
Imatra and Svetogorsk	Finland–Russia	45,000
Ivangorod–Narva	Russia–Estonia	69,000
Valga–Valka	Estonia–Latvia	20,000
Como–Chiasso (part of Greater Milan)	Italy–Switzerland	189,000
Gorizia–Nova Gorica	Italy–Slovenia	
Basel–Huningue–Weil am Rhein (Trinational Eurodistrict of Basel)	Switzerland–France–Germany	2,400,000
Geneva–Annemasse–Ferney-Voltaire–Nyon (Grand Genève)	Switzerland–France	890,000
Kreuzlingen–Konstanz	Switzerland–Germany	110,000
Basque Eurocity Bayonne-San Sebastián	France–Spain	620,000
Le Perthus–Els Límits	France–Spain	700
Bourg-Madame–Puigcerdà	France–Spain	
Hendaye–Irun	France–Spain	
Lille–Roubaix–Tourcoing–Mouscron–Tournai–Kortrijk (Eurometropolis Lille–Kortrijk–Tournai)	France–Belgium	1,850,000
Longwy–Aubange–Pétange	France–Belgium–Luxembourg	80,000
Strasbourg–Kehl (Strasbourg-Ortenau Eurodistrict)	France–Germany	700,000
Forbach–Saarbrücken	France–Germany	700,000
Monaco–Beausoleil–Cap-d'Ail	Monaco–France	55,344
La Línea de la Concepción–Gibraltar	Spain–Gibraltar	95,628
Baarle (Baarle-Hertog–Baarle-Nassau)	Belgium–Netherlands	9,262
Görlitz–Zgorzelec	Germany–Poland	85,000
Guben–Gubin	Germany–Poland	35,000
Frankfurt (Oder)–Słubice	Germany–Poland	75,000
Szczecin	Germany–Poland	763,321
Cieszyn–Český Těšín	Poland–Czech Republic	57,000
Herzogenrath–Kerkrade	Germany–Netherlands	95,000
Freilassing–Salzburg	Germany–Austria	175,000
Vienna–Bratislava	Austria–Slovakia	2,400,000
Komárom–Komárno	Hungary–Slovakia	56,000
Rousse–Giurgiu	Bulgaria–Romania	250,000
Lifford–Strabane	Ireland–United Kingdom	18,500
Brod–Slavonski Brod	Bosnia and Herzegovina–Croatia	110,000
Zvornik–Mali Zvornik	Bosnia and Herzegovina–Serbia	70,000
Gradiška–Stara Gradiška	Bosnia and Herzegovina–Croatia	53,000
Novi Grad–Dvor	Bosnia and Herzegovina–Croatia	30,000
Dubica–Hrvatska Dubica	Bosnia and Herzegovina–Croatia	23,000
Kostajnica–Hrvatska Kostajnica	Bosnia and Herzegovina–Croatia	8,000

=== North America ===
Main municipalities	Countries	Total population
Paso Canoas	Costa Rica / Panama	9,543
Metro Vancouver–Fraser Valley–Bellingham-Whatcom County	United States / Canada	3,350,000
Detroit–Windsor	United States / Canada	5,976,595
Buffalo-Niagara Region	United States / Canada	1,614,790
Port Huron–Sarnia–Point Edward	United States / Canada	105,776
Sault Ste. Marie–Sault Ste. Marie	United States / Canada	93,944
San Diego–Tijuana	United States / Mexico	5,105,769
Calexico–Mexicali	United States / Mexico	1,143,000
San Luis Río Colorado–San Luis	United States / Mexico	227,000
Nogales–Nogales	United States / Mexico	240,000
El Paso–Juárez	United States / Mexico	2,500,000
Laredo–Nuevo Laredo	United States / Mexico	775,481
Lower Rio Grande Valley	United States / Mexico	2,671,028
Reynosa–McAllen	United States / Mexico	1,500,000
Brownsville–Matamoros	United States / Mexico	1,387,985

=== South America ===
Main municipalities	Countries	Total population
Saint-Laurent-du-Maroni–Albina	French Guiana / Suriname	59.676
Saint Georges–Oiapoque	French Guiana / Brazil	32,000
Quaraí–Artigas	Brazil / Uruguay	67,000
Santana do Livramento–Rivera	Brazil / Uruguay	140,000
Chuí–Chuy	Brazil / Uruguay	15,592
Corumbá–Puerto Suárez	Brazil / Bolivia	124,000
Tabatinga–Leticia–Santa Rosa	Brazil / Colombia / Peru	107,000
Ponta Porã–Pedro Juan Caballero	Brazil / Paraguay	209,000
Foz do Iguaçu–Ciudad del Este–Puerto Iguazu	Brazil / Paraguay / Argentina	800,000
Barracão–Dionísio Cerqueira–Bernardo de Irigoyen	Brazil / Argentina	36,000
Uruguaiana–Paso de los Libres	Brazil / Argentina	170,000
Tulcán–Ipiales	Ecuador / Colombia	190,000
Cúcuta–San Antonio del Táchira	Colombia / Venezuela	700,000

== See also ==
- Border town
- Cross-border town naming
- List of divided cities
- Metropolitan area
