= Impfondo District =

Coordinates: 0.80135°N 17.70583°E

Impfondo
- District
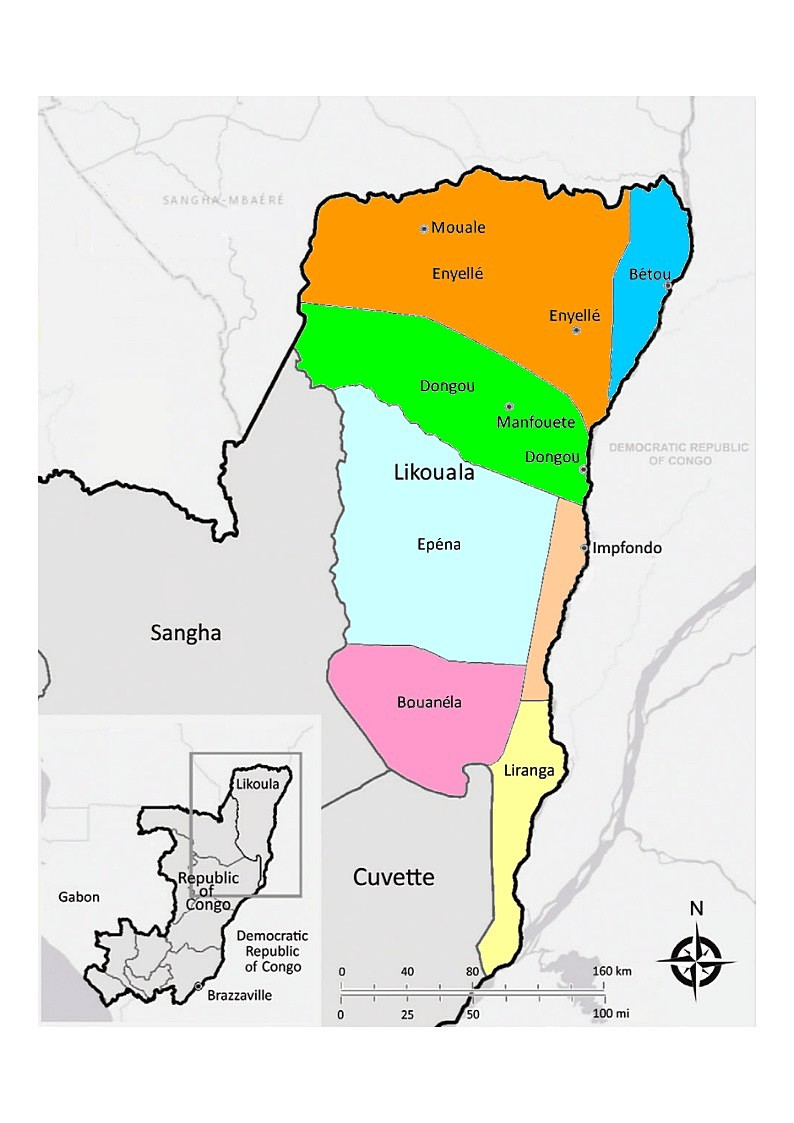
- Impfondo District in the Likouala Department
- Country: Republic of the Congo
- Department: Likouala Department
- Seat: Impfondo

Area
  - Total: 856 sq mi (2,216 km^{2})

Population (2023 census)
  - Total: 54,789
  - Density: 64.04/sq mi (24.72/km^{2})
- Time zone: UTC+1 (GMT +1)

Impfondo is a district in the Likouala Department of north-eastern Republic of the Congo. The capital lies at Impfondo. Impfondo is also the home of Likouala's capital.

== Towns and villages ==
- Impfondo
