= Bouanéla District =

Bouanéla
- District
- Location within Republic of the Congo
- Country: Republic of the Congo
- Region: Likouala Department

Area
  - Total: 2,870 sq mi (7,440 km^{2})

Population (2023 census)
  - Total: 16,359
  - Density: 5.69/sq mi (2.20/km^{2})
- Time zone: UTC+1 (GMT +1)

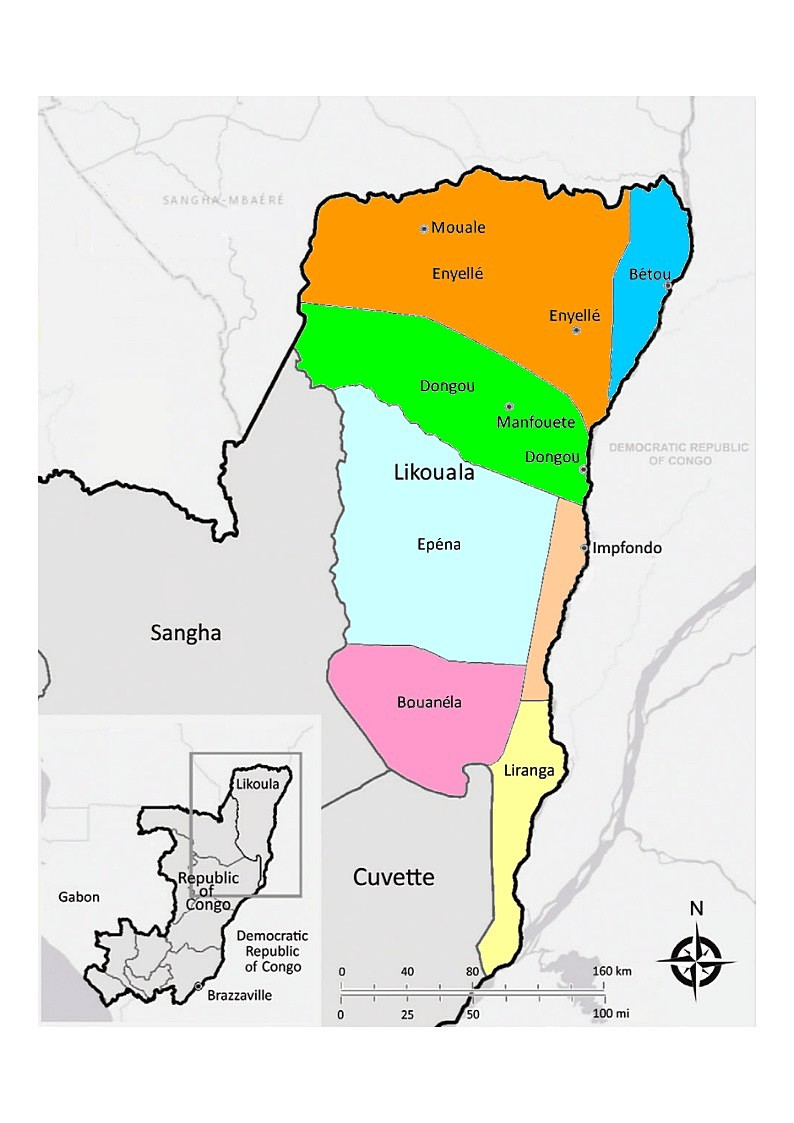
Bouanéla district in pink

Bouanéla is a district in the Likouala Department of Republic of the Congo.
