= Gabriel Bokilo =

Republic of the Congo politician (1938–2010)

Gabriel BOKILO
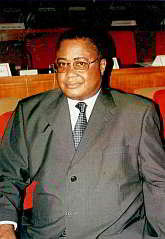

Regional prefect of Nkeni
- In office 1963–1964
- Nominated by: Alphonse Massamba-Débat

Deputy Mayor Brazzaville
- In office 1965–1967

Counselor of Minister of Justice, and the Civil Service
- In office 1967–1967

Branch Manager Societe Generale
- In office about 1971 – 1973

National director Bank of Central African States
- In office 1973–1993
- Nominated by: Marien Ngouabi

Alternate Governor World Bank International Monetary Fund
- In office 1973–1993

Minister of Trade, Consumption, small and medium enterprises
- In office 1992–1993
- President: Pascal Lissouba
- Prime Minister: Claude Antoine Dacosta

Deputy of Mossaka Parliament of Republic of the Congo
- In office 1997–2007
- President: Denis Sassou Nguesso

President of Economy and Finance Commission Parliament of Republic of the Congo
- In office 2002–2007

Personal details
- Born: 20 July 1938 (age 87) Brazzaville, French Equatorial Africa (now Congo-Brazzaville)
- Died: 26 March 2010 (aged 71) Paris, France
- Party: Union for National Redress
- Children: Jean-Emmanuel, Patrick, Thierry, Francis, Maixent, Fabrice, Mbanga, Henri, Gabrielle
- Profession: Banker, Congolese politician

Gabriel Bokilo (20 July 1938 – 26 March 2010) was a Congolese politician and the President of the Union for National Redress (URN).

== Administrative career ==
Bokilo studied in France and earned a doctorate. He became Prefect of Nkéni in 1963 and then Secretary-General of the Brazzaville city government in 1964; later, he became Director of the Cabinet of the Minister of Justice, Labour, and the Civil Service in 1967. He then briefly headed the Congolese branch of Société Générale and was subsequently the National Director of the Bank of Central African States (BEAC) in Congo-Brazzaville from 1973 to 1993; he was also Alternate Governor at the World Bank from 1973 to 1974 and Alternate Governor at the International Monetary Fund from 1975 to 1993.

== Political career ==
Following the introduction of multiparty politics, Bokilo became President of the URN, a political party. In the June–July 1992 parliamentary election, he was elected to the National Assembly as the URN candidate in the Mossaka constituency of Cuvette Region. He was also the URN candidate for the August 1992 presidential election, but he attracted little support, receiving 0.29% of the vote and placing 13th. Bokilo, who was a member of the opposition coalition, then served as Minister of Trade, Consumption, and Small and Medium-Sized Enterprises in the power-sharing government of Prime Minister Claude Antoine Dacosta from 1992 to 1993. He left his post as BEAC National Director following his appointment to the government.

Later, following the 1997 civil war, Bokilo was a member of the National Transitional Council (CNT), which acted as the provisional parliament from 1998 to 2002, and during that time he was President of the CNT's Economic Commission. He was a candidate for the position of Director-General of Air Afrique in April 1999.

In the 2002 parliamentary election, he was again elected to the National Assembly as the URN candidate in Mossaka 1 constituency; he won the seat in the first round with 53.45% of the vote. After the election, he was chosen as President of the National Assembly's Economy and Finance Commission on 24 August 2002.

The URN initially signed an agreement to merge into the New Democratic Forces (FDN) on 27 March 2007. At the new party's constitutive congress, which began on 19 April 2007, Bokilo was not chosen as President of the FDN; he then announced that he was withdrawing the URN from the FDN on 20 April, saying that "fundamental differences have emerged" and he had "decided on behalf of the party to denounce the agreement". In the 2007 parliamentary election, Bokilo stood again as the URN candidate in Mossaka 1 constituency. In the first round, he placed second behind Léon-Raphaël Mokoko, an independent candidate, receiving 21.21% of the vote against 46.01% for Mokoko. He was then defeated by Mokoko in the second round.

Beginning in 2007, Bokilo's health declined and he frequently visited Paris for medical treatment. He was hospitalized in Paris on 18 March 2010 and died of colon cancer on 26 March.
