= Eurometropolis Lille–Kortrijk–Tournai =

Transborder agglomeration in Western Europe

Coordinates: 50.7°N 3.2°E

Controlled access highways

Eurometropolis Lille–Kortrijk–Tournai is a metropolitan area in Europe around the transborder agglomeration of the French city of Lille, and the Belgian cities Kortrijk and Tournai.

It covers the local regions Lille Métropole, south-eastern West Flanders (4 districts) and Wallonie Picarde (3 districts), 147 municipalities in total. The 2008 population was 2,155,161.

It is one of the EU-designated cross-border regions under the auspices of European Grouping of Territorial Cooperation.
