= Enyellé District =

Coordinates: 2.817°N 18.016°E

Enyellé
- District
- Interactive map of Enyellé
- Country: Republic of the Congo
- Department: Likouala Department

Area
  - Total: 6,980 sq mi (18,079 km^{2})

Population (2023 census)
  - Total: 51,188
  - Density: 7.3332/sq mi (2.8314/km^{2})
- Time zone: UTC+1 (GMT +1)

Enyellé is a district in the Likouala Department of Republic of the Congo.
