= Mamadou Camara (politician) =

Malian politician

Mamadou Camara was the Minister of the Digital Economy, Information and Communication for the Government of Mali, from April 11, 2014 to January 2015.
