= Léon-Alfred Opimbat =

Congolese politician

Léon-Alfred Opimbat (born c. 1950) is a Congolese politician. He served in the government of Congo-Brazzaville as Minister of Health from 1992 to 1993 and as Minister of National Solidarity and Humanitarian Action from 1997 to 2002, with additional responsibility for the health portfolio beginning in 1999. Subsequently, he was a Deputy in the National Assembly from 2002 to 2007 and again from 2007 to 2011. He was also President of the New Democratic Forces (FDN), a political party, from 2007 to 2011; when the FDN merged itself into the ruling Congolese Labour Party (PCT) in July 2011, Opimbat became a member of the PCT Political Bureau. He was Minister of Sports from 2011 to 2017, and he has been First Vice-president of the National Assembly since 2017.

== Political career ==
Opimbat studied in France at the University of Caen and received a degree in medicine. In Congo-Brazzaville, he worked as chief medical officer in charge of health and social services at Marien Ngouabi University in Brazzaville and in a similar capacity at the National Electrical Company.

He is married to Charlotte Opimbat. The couple have five children.

In the June–July 1992 parliamentary election, Opimbat was first elected to the National Assembly as a candidate in the Mbomo constituency of Cuvette-Ouest Region. In the power-sharing government of Prime Minister Claude Antoine Dacosta, which was appointed on 25 December 1992 and served until after the mid-1993 parliamentary election, Opimbat was Minister of Health, Population, and Social Affairs.

Following the June–October 1997 civil war, Opimbat, who was President of the Congolese Association for Openness, Salvation and Solidarity (ACOSS), was appointed to the government as Minister of National Solidarity, the Displaced and the Victims of War, in charge of Humanitarian Action, on 2 November 1997. He was subsequently moved to the post of Minister of Health, Solidarity, and Humanitarian Action on 12 January 1999.

After a number of people died of the Ebola virus, apparently due to eating primate meat, Opimbat announced a ban on the consumption of primate meat in the northwestern part of the country, near the Gabonese border, on 5 February 2002. In April 2002, he called for international aid to help thousands of people who had fled their homes in the Pool Region due to violence involving rebel Ninja militia fighters.

In the May 2002 parliamentary election, Opimbat was elected to the National Assembly as the ACOSS candidate in Mbomo constituency; he won the seat in the first round with 59.08% of the vote. Following the election, he was not included in the government that was appointed on 18 August 2002; Alain Moka was appointed to replace him as Minister of Health, and Moka succeeded Opimbat in that post on 22 August. Opimbat was then chosen as President of the National Assembly's Foreign Affairs and Cooperation Commission on 24 August 2002. The newspaper Le Choc reported on 20 July 2004 that Opimbat, together with a minister and two other former ministers, had been barred from leaving the country without Sassou Nguesso's approval due to suspicions that they had misused public funds. This report was denied on the next day by public prosecutor Georges Akiéra.

In March 2007, ACOSS agreed to merge with several other parties to create a new party, the New Democratic Forces (FDN). At the FDN's constitutive congress (19–21 April 2007), Opimbat was chosen to jointly head the FDN's National Executive Bureau together with Jean-Marie Tassoua, and on 15 May he and Tassoua signed an electoral agreement on behalf of the FDN with the governing Congolese Labour Party (PCT).

In the June–August 2007 parliamentary election, Opimbat was the FDN candidate in Mbomo constituency, but in the first round of the election, held on 24 June 2007, he was defeated by Jean Matamaya, the candidate of the Movement for Solidarity and Development (MSD), who won a narrow majority with about 52% of the vote. Opimbat rejected this result and filed an appeal with the Constitutional Court; on 26 October 2007, the Constitutional Court ruled in his favor, ordering that the election be held over again in Mbomo. In the revote, held on 7 December 2007, Opimbat won the seat, receiving 61.46% of the vote. He thus became one of three FDN deputies in the National Assembly.

As of 2008, Opimbat is a member of the National Coordination of the Rally of the Presidential Majority (RMP), a large coalition of parties supporting President Denis Sassou Nguesso. During the campaign for the 12 July 2009 presidential election, Opimbat worked on President Sassou Nguesso's re-election campaign, heading its health department.

After several years of dual leadership alongside Tassoua, Opimbat was elected as the sole President of the FDN at its First Ordinary Congress on 2–3 May 2010. On that occasion, he reaffirmed the party's participation in the RMP coalition and said that the FDN was a social democratic party.

The FDN merged itself into the ruling PCT in July 2011, on the occasion of the PCT's Sixth Extraordinary Congress. At the congress, Opimbat was elected to the PCT's 51-member Political Bureau. He was then appointed to the government as Minister of Sports and Physical Education as part of a minor reshuffle on 17 August 2011. He took office on 26 August 2011, succeeding Jacques Yvon Ndolou.

In the July 2012 parliamentary election, Opimbat was re-elected to the National Assembly as the PCT candidate in Mbomo constituency; he won the seat in the first round of voting, receiving 100% of the vote. He was retained in his post as Minister of Sports and Physical Education in the government that was appointed on 25 September 2012.

As Minister of Sports, Opimbat's responsibilities included preparations for the 2015 All-Africa Games in Brazzaville. He announced in March 2014 that the games would be delayed by two months, to September 2015; he said that the delay was due to other international sporting events being held at the time and was intended to facilitate participation by more African athletes.

In the July 2017 parliamentary election, he was re-elected to the National Assembly as the PCT candidate in Mbomo, winning the seat in the first round with 95% of the vote. On 19 August 2017, when the National Assembly began meeting for its new term, Opimbat was elected as First Vice-president of the National Assembly. As the only candidate for the post, he received 142 votes from the deputies present. Opimbat himself was not present; as Minister of Sports, he was in Kinshasa for a qualifying football match at the time. Having been elected to a post in the Bureau of the National Assembly, he was not included in the government appointed on 22 August, and Hugues Ngouélondélé was appointed to succeed him as Minister of Sports.
