= Vienna-Bratislava metropolitan region =

- Metropolitan region
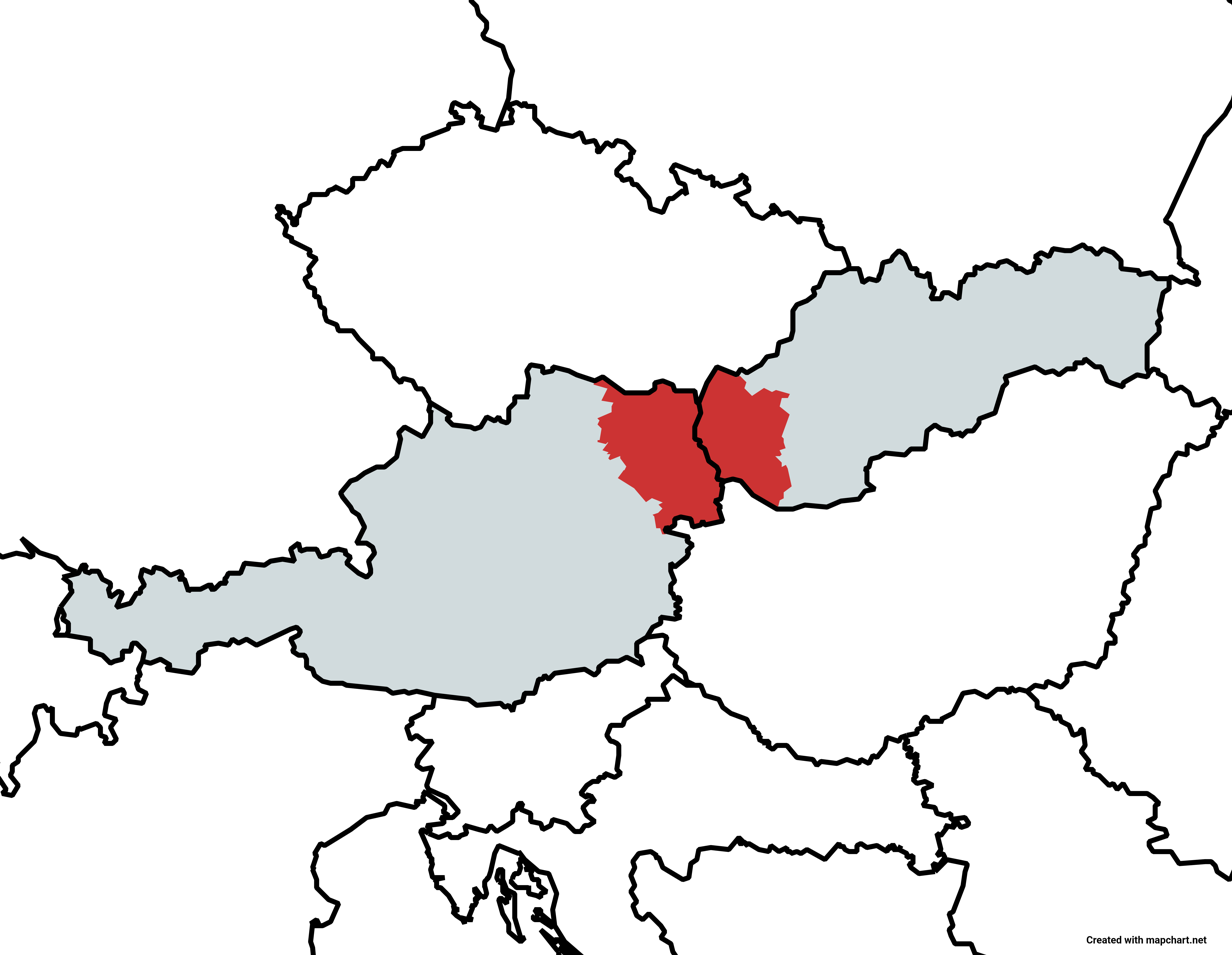
- Country: Austria; Slovakia
- Largest Cities: Vienna (2,001,593); Bratislava (475,503)

Area
  - Metro: 14,000 km^{2} (5,400 sq mi)

Population
  - Metro: 4,700,000
  - Metro density: 340/km^{2} (870/sq mi)
- Time zone: UTC+1 (CET)
  - Summer (DST): UTC+2 (CEST)

The Vienna-Bratislava metropolitan region is one of 5 polycentric metropolitan areas in European Union. It has population of about 4.7 million inhabitants and covers an area of around 14,000 square kilometres (5,400 sq mi). It is located in seven administrative units (NUTS-3 class).

The distance from Vienna to Bratislava is approximately 50 km.

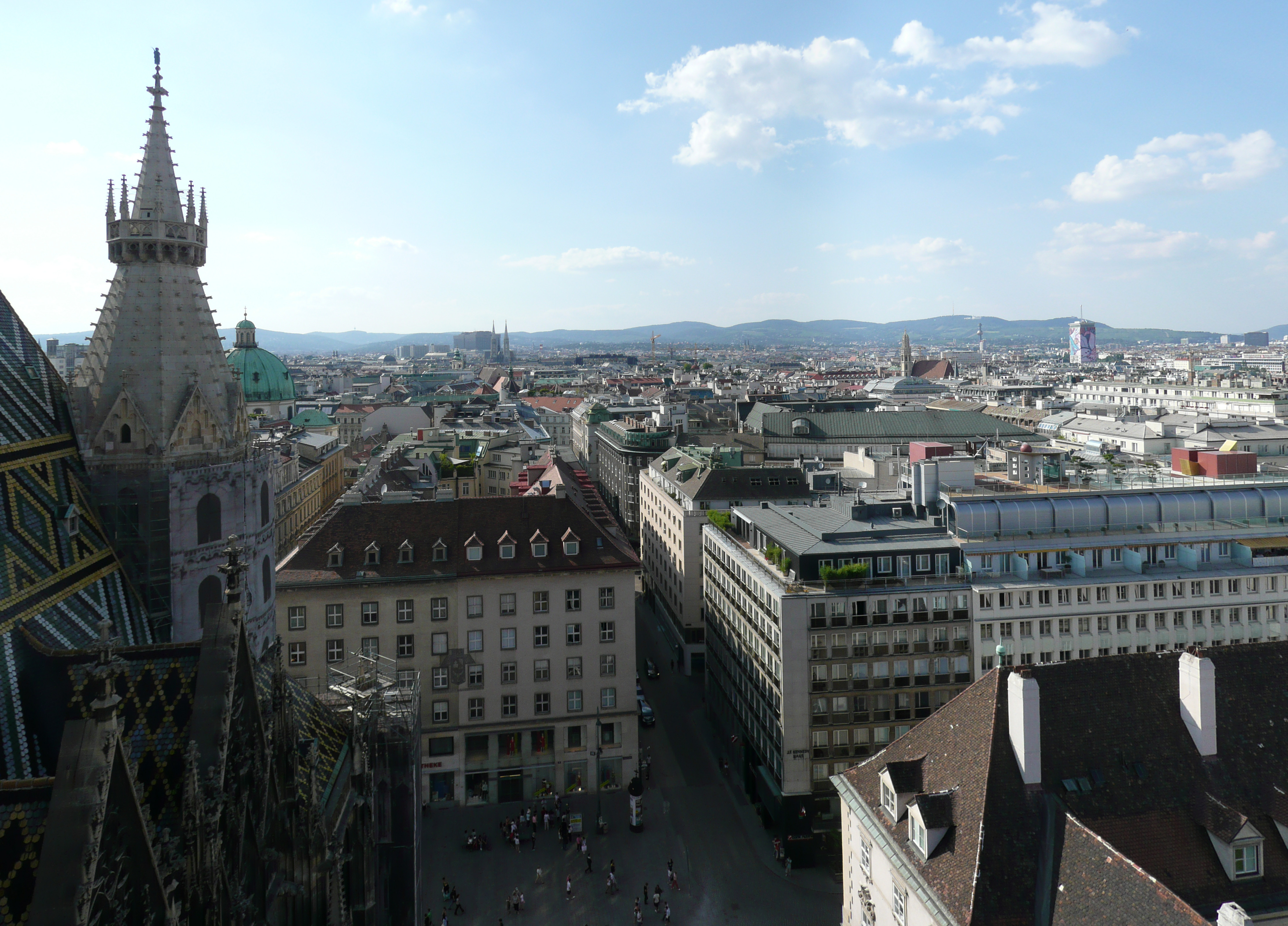
Aerial view of Vienna

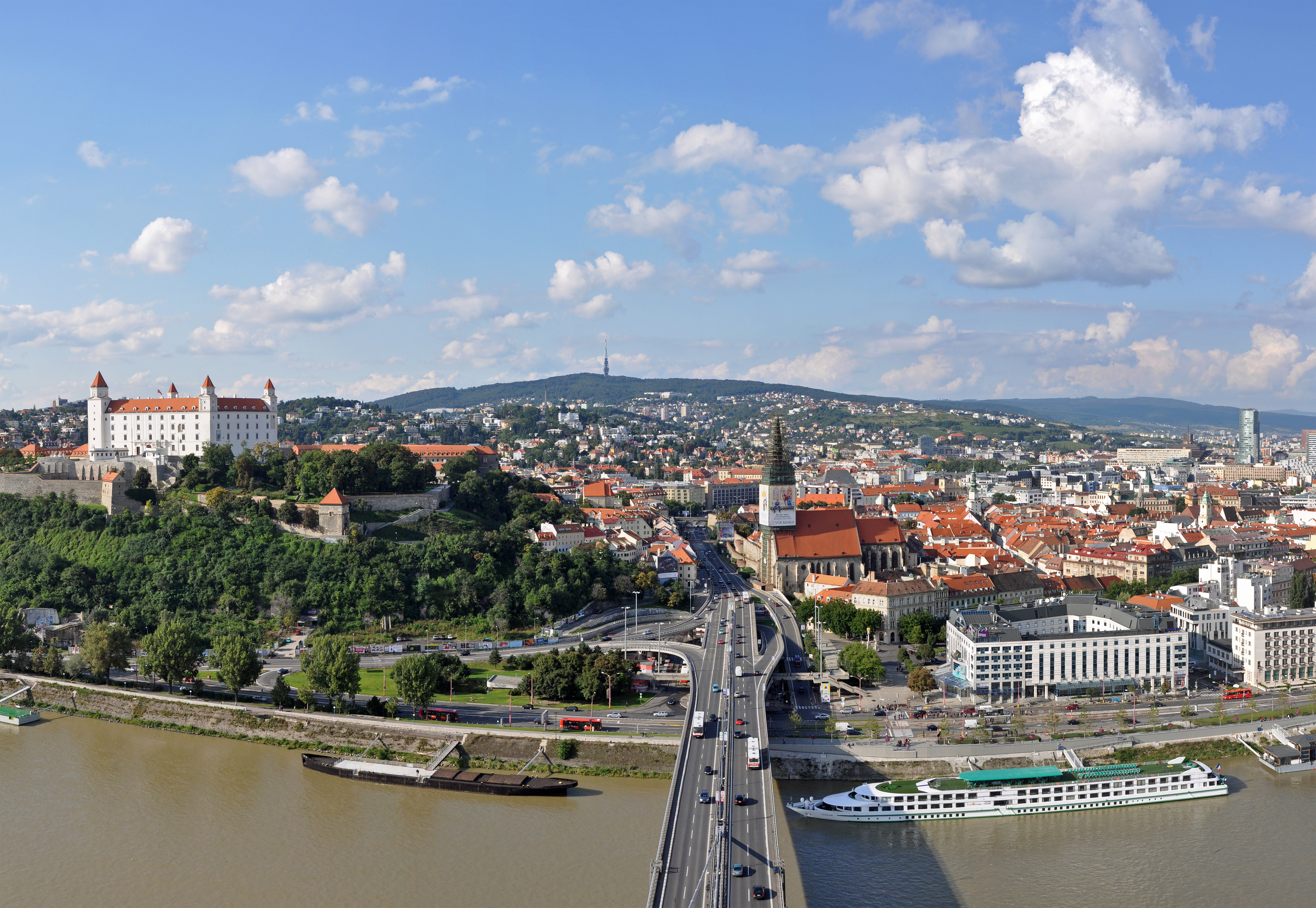
Aerial view of Bratislava

== See also ==
- List of metropolitan areas in Europe
