= Brazzaville–Kinshasa Bridge =

Proposed bridge crossing the Congo River

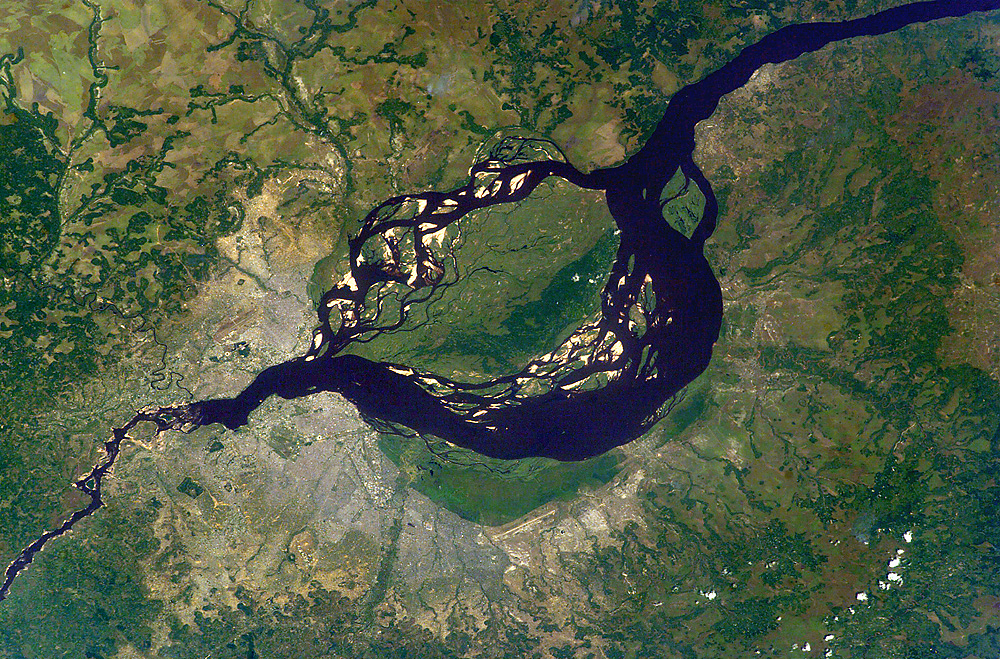
- Brazzaville and Kinshasa
- Coordinates: 4°19′16″S 15°14′8″E

Characteristics
- Total length: 1,575m

History
- Opening: 2028

Location
- Interactive map of Brazzaville–Kinshasa Bridge

The Brazzaville–Kinshasa Bridge is a proposed road-rail bridge construction project over the Congo River. It would connect the Republic of the Congo with the Democratic Republic of the Congo at their respective capitals, Brazzaville and Kinshasa. In February 2026, officials from the two countries validated a bilateral agreement establishing a harmonized tax and customs regime for the project, and the request-for-proposals process was launched on 1 July 2026.

== Background ==
The cities of Brazzaville and Kinshasa, capitals of the Republic of the Congo (ROC) and the Democratic Republic of the Congo (DRC) respectively, are situated on opposite banks of the Congo River. They are the closest national capitals on Earth (excluding the Vatican, located in Rome, since the city-state has no capital). Plans for a bridge crossing the Congo River to connect the two countries were financed in 1991 but shelved in 1993 due to a lack of sufficient funding and turmoil in the ROC.

The project was revived a decade later in 2003 by the ROC's Transport Infrastructure Unit (Cellule d’infrastructures de transport), which had previously cooperated with the European Union on similar projects in Central Africa. The proposed bridge was relocated downstream to take advantage of the narrower and rocky riverbed which would facilitate easier erection of bridge piers. The cost of construction was estimated to be between 40 million and 80 million euros in 2003. In January 2004, the project was endorsed by the Economic Community of Central African States (ECCAS), which by then was estimated to cost 403 million euros.

The project stalled in 2005 when DRC presidential chief of staff Léonard She Okitundu expressed that the project would adversely affect economic activity in its port towns of Boma and Matadi, which are key contributors to its economy. The DRC refused to endorse the bridge project without a commitment by the New Partnership for Africa's Development (NEPAD) to finance a deepwater port in Banana, its only city on the Atlantic coast. Okitundu also confirmed that sanctions by the African Union meant the DRC had been excluded from negotiations with NEPAD regarding the projects. A 2010 report by the World Bank stated that the proposed bridge would instead increase maritime traffic to Pointe-Noire, ROC's main port city on the Atlantic.

Following a study in 2009, the project lay dormant until a meeting was held between the two countries in Libreville, Gabon in December 2016. In January 2017, the ECCAS reactivated the project, with the African Development Bank pledging 250 million euros to the project. The two Congos were to raise the remaining 110 million euros and seek donors for an additional 40 million euros. An agreement was formally signed in November 2018 between the ROC and DRC for a 1,575m-long toll bridge to connect their capitals.

Construction works have since been repeatedly delayed and work was expected to commence in 2023. The bridge is expected to be completed in 2028.

In February 2025, Congolese officials said that bidding to select the concessionaire would open in June 2025 and that the concessionaire would be chosen in September 2025, with financial close to follow. In February 2026, however, officials from the two countries said that the newly harmonized tax and customs framework would allow the request-for-proposals process to be relaunched in the following days.

A Request for Proposals was launched on 1 July 2026 to begin the bidding process. A Joint Technical Committee was held from 22 to 25 July in Kinshasa. Final bids were expected to be submitted by 1 October 2026.

Africa50 continued to describe itself in 2026 as the lead developer for the project, responsible for structuring the public-private partnership and leading the project preparation and development phase.

== Gauge ==
The rail link will be single track. Both sides of the bridge use the same 1067mm gauge. For compatibility with AIHSRN third rails or Dual Gauge sleepers should be provided.

== See also ==
- List of road–rail bridges
- Railway stations in the Republic of the Congo
- List of railway stations in the Democratic Republic of the Congo
- Tripoli-Cape Town Highway
- Trans-African Highway network
- Democratic Republic of the Congo-Republic of the Congo relations
- Kinshasa–Brazzaville
