= Kinshasa–Brazzaville =

- Transborder agglomeration in Africa
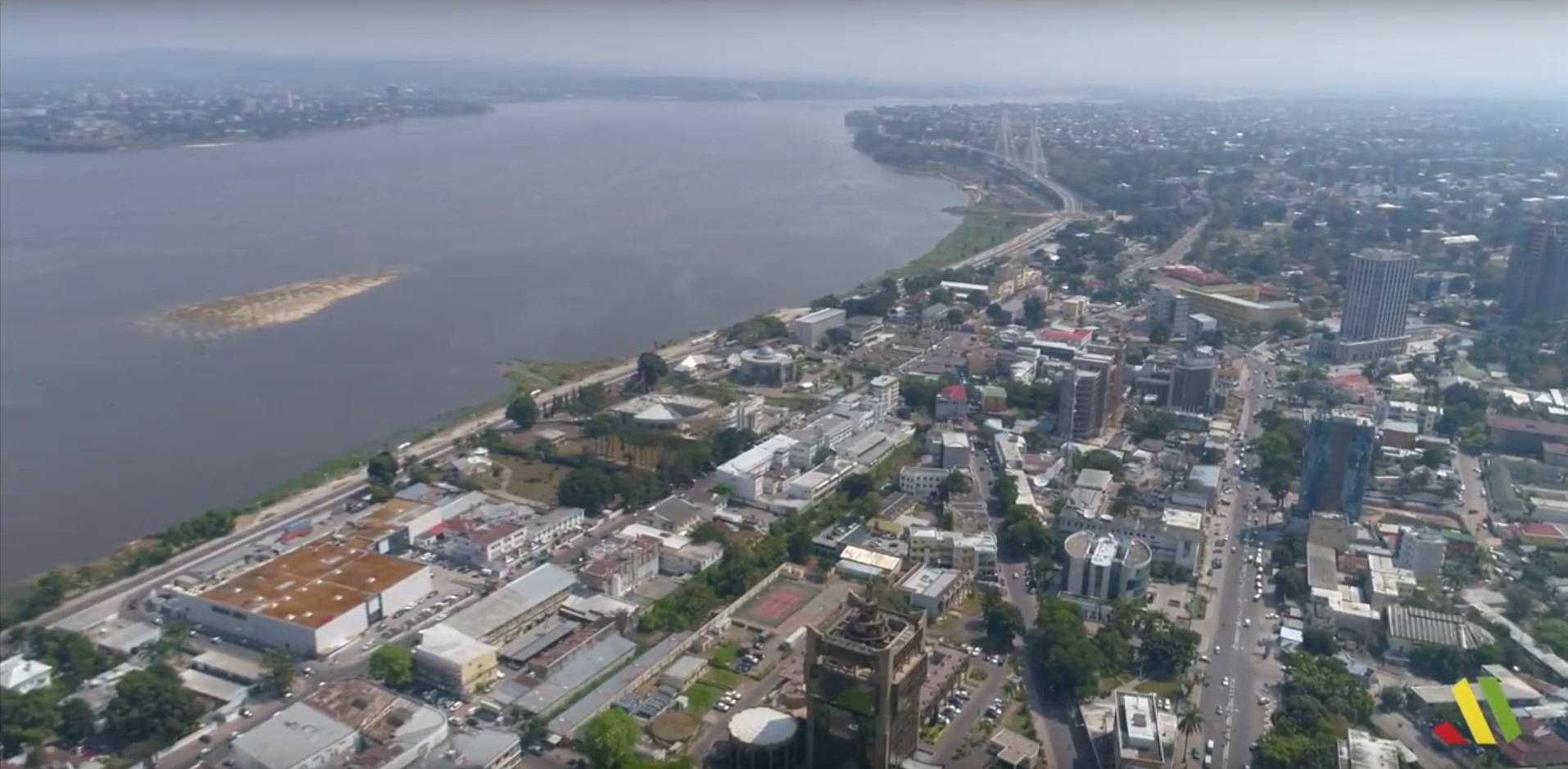
- Brazzaville, Republic of the Congo, and Kinshasa, Democratic Republic of the Congo, bird's-eye view
- Nickname: Double Congo
- Countries: Democratic Republic of the Congo; Republic of the Congo
- Largest city: Kinshasa (17,071,000)

Area
  - Total: 10,229 km^{2} (3,949 sq mi)

Population (2019 est.)
  - Total: 19,379,000
  - Density: 1,894.5/km^{2} (4,906.8/sq mi)

Kinshasa–Brazzaville is a transborder agglomeration comprising Kinshasa, the capital of the Democratic Republic of the Congo, and Brazzaville, the capital of the Republic of the Congo, which face each other across the Congo River. In addition to being the closest national capitals by proximity, it is the third largest urban agglomeration on the African continent, behind Lagos and Greater Cairo. The two cities currently do not have a bridge between each other, and numerous attempts to link the two by bridge have yet to materialize.

	Urban area (km^{2})	Population
Kinshasa	600	17,071,000
Brazzaville	100	2,557,100
Kinshasa–Brazzaville	700	19,628,100

== Airline connections ==
There are commercial airline flights between the two cities' airports (Maya-Maya Airport in Brazzaville, N'djili International Airport in Kinshasa) on ASKY Airlines; the flights, among the shortest international flights in the world, last about five minutes each way, usually.
