= Dongou District =

Coordinates: 2.951°N 17.580°E

Dongou
- District
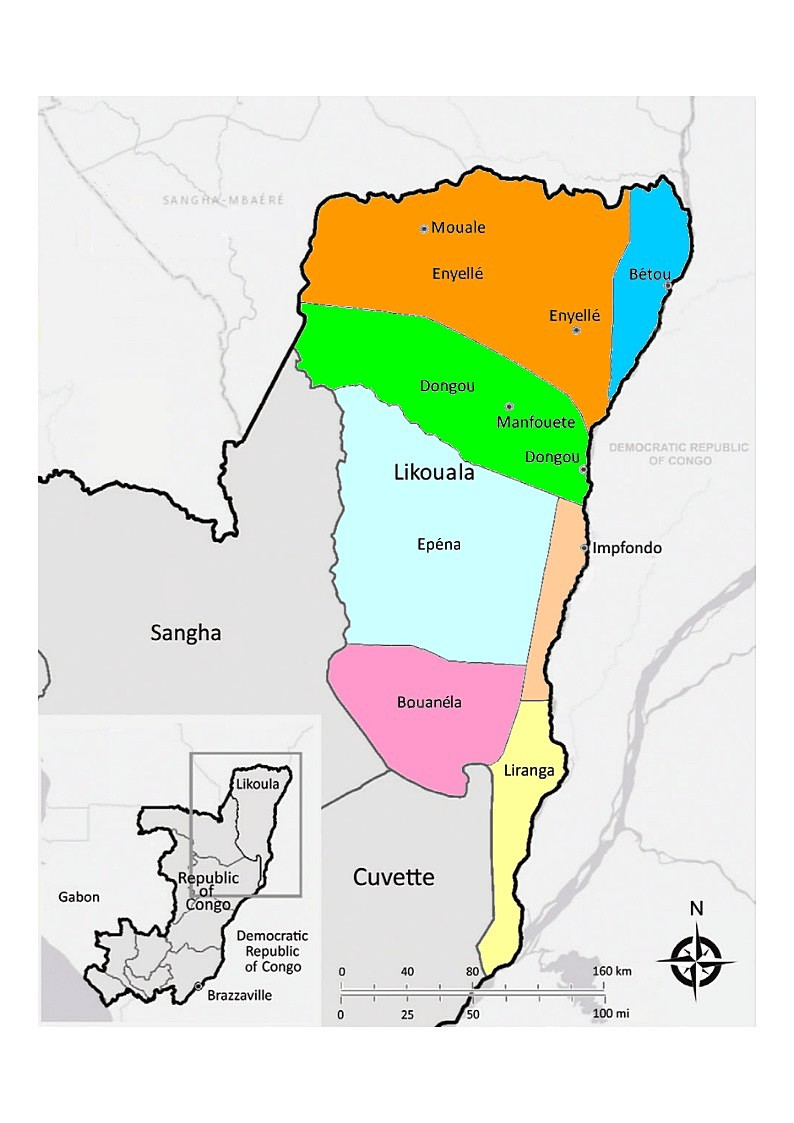
- Dongou District in the department
- Country: Republic of the Congo
- Department: Likouala Department
- Seat: Dongou

Area
  - Total: 4,242 sq mi (10,988 km^{2})

Population (2023 census)
  - Total: 44,027
  - Density: 10.378/sq mi (4.0068/km^{2})
- Time zone: UTC+1 (GMT +1)

Dongou is a district in the Likouala Department of north-eastern Republic of the Congo. The capital lies at Dongou.

== Towns and villages ==
- Dongou
- Manfoueté
