= LICOPA affair =

The LICOPA affair (French: l'affaire LICOPA) was a diplomatic conflict between the People's Republic of Congo (Congo-Brazzaville) and Zaire (present-day Democratic Republic of Congo) during the Cold War in the early 1970s. At the time the two neighbouring states found themselves on opposing sides in Cold War politics, with Zaire under Mobutu Sese Seko a Western ally and Congo a socialist state aligned with the Soviet Union.

The Zairean authorities claimed that the Congolese embassy in Kinshasa had functioned as an intermediary between the Congolese League for Peace and Friendship between the Peoples (LIgue COngolaise pour la Paix et l'Amitié entre les peuples, LICOPA; 'licopa' is also the Lingala word for 'secret complot') and Zairean 'subversives'. According to Zaire, LICOPA trained Zairean opposition activists. Several persons accused of involvement with LICOPA were arrested in Zaire, whilst others were forced into exile.

On August 21, 1971, Zaire declared the Congolese chargé d'affaires in Kinshasa, Lieutenant Eyabo, to be a persona non grata.

In an attempt to revive Congolese-Zairean relations, the Congolese authorities carried out arrests to appease Zaire. One of the arrested was Ando Ibarra, who had been charged in absentia in a Kinshasa court for endangering national security and spreading 'false rumours' in the Zairean army. Ibarra was sentenced to three years imprisonment in Congo.

However, Congo never admitted that there had been any links between Ibarra and Lieutenant Eyado (as charged by Zaire). After being released, Ibarra was banished from Congo for ten years.
