= Bétou =

Town in the Republic of the Congo

- Town
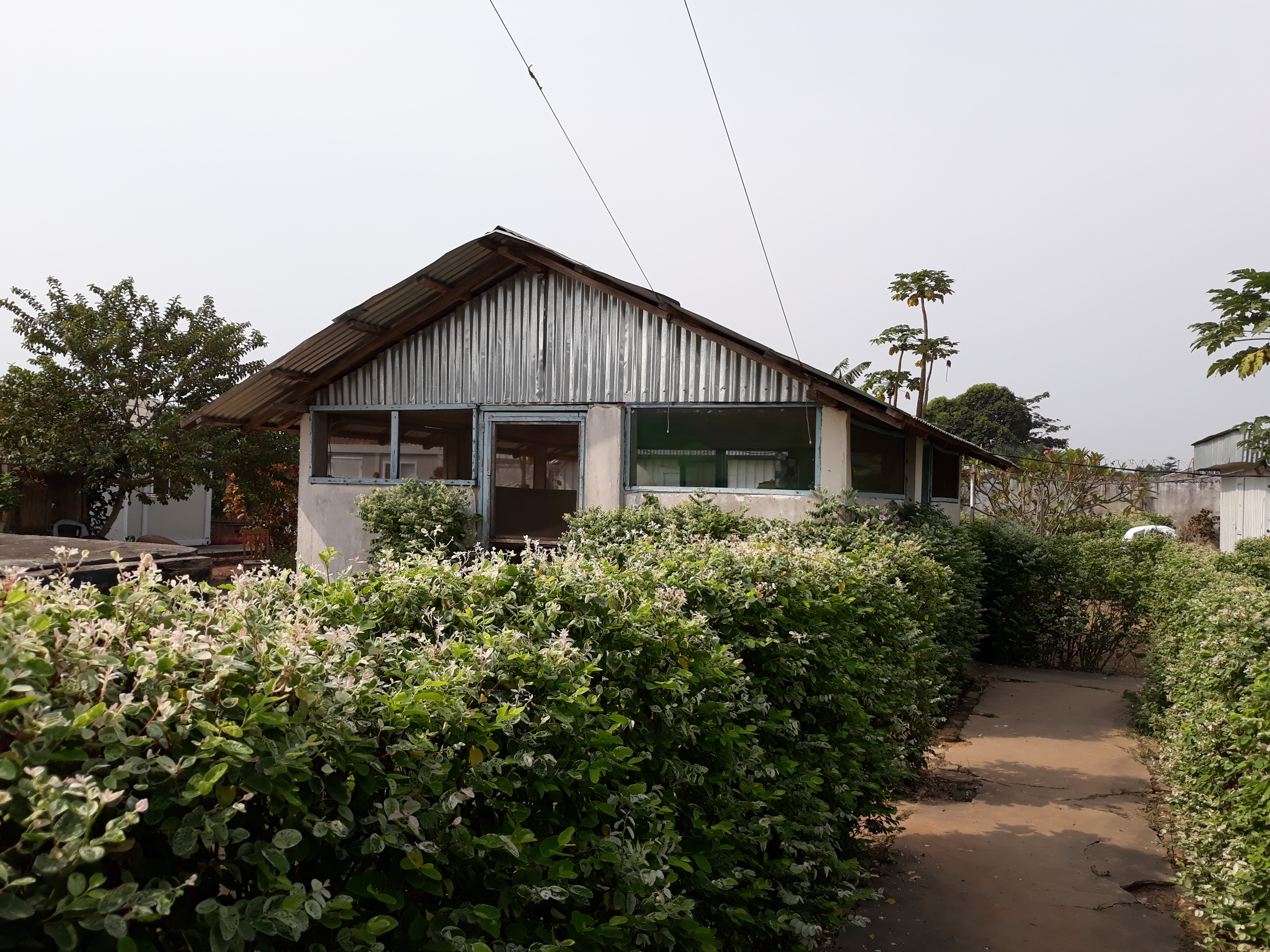
- Bétou in 2017

- Location in the Republic of the Congo
- Coordinates: 3°03′34″N 18°30′51″E
- Country: Republic of the Congo
- Department: Likouala
- District: Dongou

Population (2023 census)
  - Total: 59,563

Bétou is a town in the far north of the Republic of the Congo, situated in the right bank of the Ubangi River in the Likouala Department. It is on the border with the Central African Republic, and is approximately 90 km (56 mi) from the border by road or 45 km (28 mi) by river.

Bétou is served by the Bétou airport (IATA: BTB, ICAO: FCOT).
