= Dongou =

- Location in the Republic of the Congo
- Coordinates: 2°2′41″N 18°3′9″E
- Country: Republic of the Congo
- Department: Likouala
- District: Dongou

Population (2023 census)
  - Total: 13,433

Dongou is a town and the seat of Dongou District in the Likouala Department of northeastern Republic of the Congo.

Dongou was the first capital of the region of "Oubangui inférieure" when it was in French Congo. At independence on 1960, it became the economic capital of Likouala region. Now, Dongou's population is around 10,000. Dongou receives two rivers: Oubangui with white water, and Motaba River with black water. Dongou is the geographic center of Africa.
