= Alphonse van Gèle =

Belgian soldier

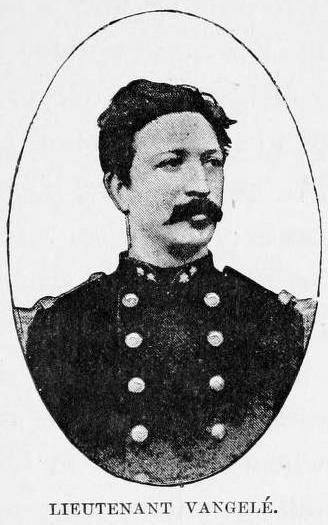
- Vangelé as a lieutenant
- Born: 25 April 1848; Brussels, Belgium
- Died: 23 February 1939 (aged 90); Brussels, Belgium
- Occupations: Colonial soldier, explorer, administrator

Alphonse van Gèle, also written van Gele or Vangele (25 April 1848 – 23 February 1939), was a Belgian soldier who served as the Vice-Governor General of the Congo Free State from December 1897 until January 1899. He established the Equator Station, or Station de l’Équateur, today Mbandaka, and concluded a treaty with the powerful Zanzibar trader Tippu Tip at the Stanley Falls station, today Kisangani. He is known for having confirmed that the Uele River was the upper part of the Ubangi River.

== Early years ==
Alphonse van Gèle was born in Brussels on 25 April 1848. He enlisted as a volunteer in the 8th Line Regiment in 1867, was made a sub-lieutenant in 1872 and became a lieutenant in the 3rd Line Regiment in 1878. He was appointed Adjoint d'État-Major (Deputy Chief of Staff) in 1881.

== Colonial career ==
=== Route to Léopoldville (1882–1883) ===
In 1881 Van Gèle offered his services to the International African Association as Deputy Lieutenant to the State Major, and received a short training course at the Institut Cartographique Militaire. On 5 May 1882 he embarked at Southampton for Cape Town, where he joined the engineer Lieutenant Louis Valcke, who had gone to the east coast of Africa to recruit 250 Zanzibaris there and bring them to the estuary of Congo River. They reached the mouth of the Congo on 3 July 1882, then traveled to Banana and Vivi.

Henry Morton Stanley had arrived in Vivi on 4 July 1882 and was organizing an expedition up the Congo River to the Stanley Falls, which would take control of the country along the route. When Valcke and Van Gèle arrived in Vivi with their contingent, Stanley at once instructed them to work on construction of the road from Vivi to Isangila, (Note: The road to Isangila is mentioned by William Holman Bentley in his account of the Baptist Missionary Society, which came to the lower Congo in 1878. The African traders refused to let them travel up to Stanley Pool, for fear that they would bypass them and destroy the trade. Eventually they heard of Stanley's new steamer-road, which they found to extend about 50 miles (80 km) from Vivi along the north bank up to Isangila. From there they managed to travel quickly and unobtrusively up to the Pool.) bypassing the rapids and leading to the navigable section up to Manyanga, then to connect Manyanga to Léopoldville. The work had to be done quickly so the dismantled Association internationale Africaine steamer and goods could be carried to Léopoldville for the planned expedition. In the course of the work Van Gèle suffered from violent bouts of fever and had to be evacuated to Boma. He recovered, rejoined Valcke, and helped him until a post was erected on the territory of Chief Lutete as a staging point for the Manyanga-Léopoldville transport. Van Gèle took charge of the Lutete post and ran it effectively until 1 April 1883, when he was appointed to replace Valcke, who had himself been appointed to replace Charles-Marie de Braconnier in Léopoldville.

=== Équateur (1883–1884) ===

In May 1883 Van Gèle and Camille Coquilhat were appointed to accompany Stanley in his expedition to the Upper Congo. The expedition left Léopoldville on 9 May 1883 with all their steamers: En Avant, Eclaireur, Royal and A.I.A.. The expedition had seven Europeans and 67 Africans. Stanley reached the mouth of the Ruki River on 9 June 1883 and directed Van Gèle and Coquilhat to build a station there. On 20 June 1883 Van Gèle signed a treaty with Ikenge, principal chief in the district of Ibonga-Wangata, and Ipambi, principal chief in the same district, in which they ceded all property in perpetuity, the land and the rights to exploit the resources of the country and to create and roads and establishments suitable for developing the commercial and other relations of the Committee and Expedition.

Assisted by Coquilhat, Van Gèle built a model station and was named its commander. It was called Equator Station, or Station de l’Équateur, then Equateurville, later Coquilhatville, today Mbandaka. The Belgians became involved in local power struggles. In one conflict a local ruler was killed and the spoils of war ended up in Van Gèle's ethnographic collection. While the Équateur station was being built, Stanley explored the Lulonga River and Lake Tumba. He returned to Leopoldville, then immediately left for the Falls. He returned to Équateurville, where he praised the station, the discipline of the soldiers and the good but not over-familiar relations with the local people.

=== First Ubangi expedition (1884) ===
At the beginning of April 1884 Van Gèle briefly explored the course of the Ruki River. On 17 April 1884 Edmond Hanssens, who had replaced Stanley in the Upper Congo, arrived in Equateurville. Two days later Hanssens and Van Gèle set out in the En Avant to explore the Ubangi River with the pharmacist Courtois, de Guérin and the mechanic Amelot, a crew of ten Zanzibaris and a local African who was to act as their interpreter.

Going downstream the steamer skirted the right bank of the Congo River, but was carried by the current into a maze of islands. After three days they saw some native fishermen in a canoe. Van Gèle managed to persuade them to act as pilots, and after four hours of full steam on 21 April 1884 entered a strong stream of yellow water, the Ubangi, which they ascended to the Bisongo village. They received a friendly reception, and Hanssens exchanged blood with Chief Mkoko. The chief agreed to place both banks of the Ubangi under the protection of the International African Association. After returning to Equateurville Hanssens left Van Gèle in charge and took Coquihat with him to found the Bangala station, the future Nouvelle Anvers. Van Gèle concluded nine treaties between 26 April and 16 July 1884, including several that were signed in the Ruki River region.

=== Upper Congo (1884–1885) ===
Hanssens left Léopoldville for Belgium on 8 November after dividing his command into two regions. Guillaume Casman was given the territory from the Pool to Equateur, while Van Gèle took the territory from there to the Falls. On 11 November 1884 Casman left for Équateur in an expedition with three steamers: the Royal, A.I.A. and En Avant. The members included Casman, Charles Liebrechts and Camille Van den Plas. They stopped at Kimpoko to embark the Swedish lieutenant Edde Gleerup, who had been appointed second to Wester at the Falls. On 24 November 1884 they reached Msuata. Casman arrived at Equateur Station on 12 December 1884, where Van Gèle handed over command in a ceremony before the native chiefs.

Van Gèle then left for a visit to the Falls accompanied by the intendant Van den Plas and Gleerup. Well before reaching the Aruwimi River he noticed that the local people had been terrorized by a recent attack by the Arabs against the Basokos. He reached the Basoko villages at the mouth of the Aruwimi on 20 January 1885. The people had fled, and the Arabs had built a fortified camp there. They greeted Van Gèle with a show of friendship. The supply expedition continued on to Stanley Falls. The land upstream from the Aruwimi had all been deserted by the people, who had fled the Arabs.

Soon after the expedition reached the Falls, Tippo-Tip sent his nephew Rachid to greet Van Gèle. Later that day Tippo-Tip himself visited Van Gèle and assured him he wanted cordial relations with the Europeans and would stop hunting for slaves. Van Gèle thought it was better to try to use Arab power to help the Belgians get established, as did Hanssens and Coquilhat. He left Lieutenant Gleerup at the Falls with Tippo-Tip to support Lieutenant Arvid Wester. (Note: Van Gèle's biographer Engels writes that Gleerup replaced Wester at the Falls. This disagrees with other sources that say Gleerup was made second in command to Wester, who remained at the Falls until 1886.) He made many treaties with the local chiefs on his way downstream. His term over, he reached Europe on 15 May 1885, where the King named him a knight of his order. On 5 June 1885 Van Gèle left Europe for the Congo as commander of the territory between the Aruwimi and Stanley Falls. He arrived in the Congo on 25 July 1885 and reached Léopoldville on 26 October 1885. He developed a fever, and was forced to return. He spent some time in Madeira, then returned to Brussels on 15 May 1886, completely recovered.

=== Second Ubangi expedition (1886) ===
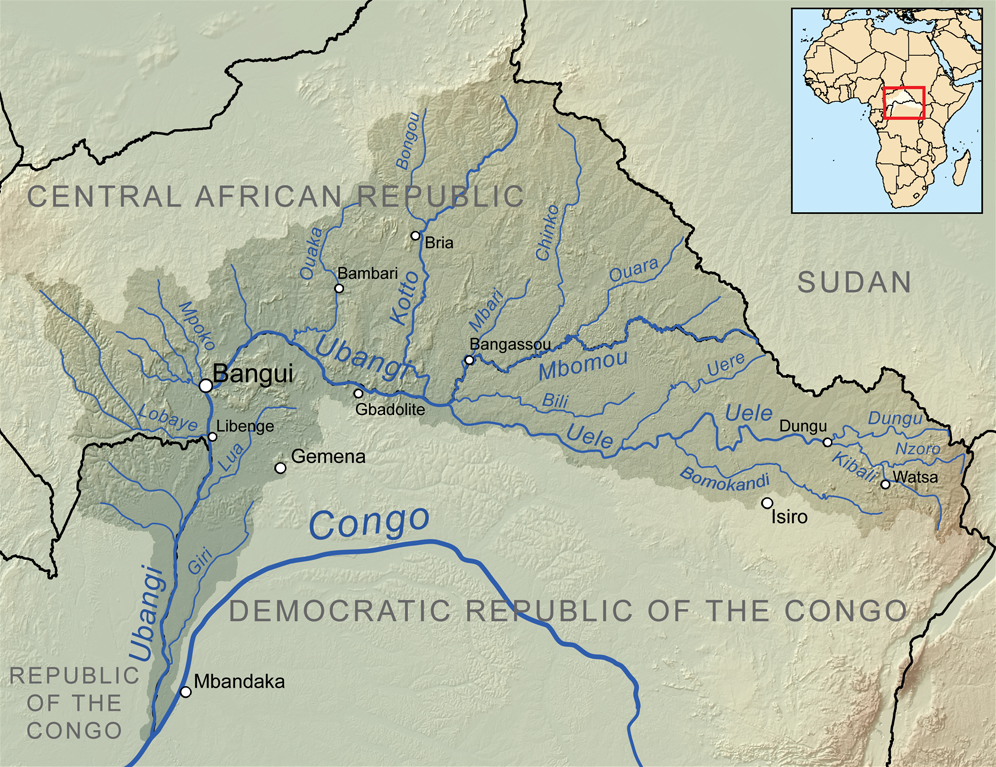
Ubangi River basin

The geographer Alphonse-Jules Wauters had published the theory that the Uele River which Georg August Schweinfurth had explored was the same as the Ubangi River explored by Hanssens. The Congo Free State government charged Van Gèle with exploring the Ubangi above 4° north to resolve the problem. He should also conclude treaties with chiefs of territories on the left bank of the river. Van Gèle, in the company of Raert, embarked in Ostend on 30 June 1886, en route to Vivi via London and Madeira. His mission was said to be to organize the Falls region. On 2 August 1886 Van Gèle, accompanied by lieutenant Liénart, left Léopoldville on the Henry Reed of the American Baptist Missionary Union. On 11 October 1886 they left Equateur Station and entered the Ubangi the next day, passed the French post of N'Kundja and anchored upstream at a small island near Bisongo. The commander of Kundja joined them there and told Van Gèle the French government had instructed him to deny access to the Ubangi, but Van Gèle argued that the Berlin Conference had declared freedom of navigation of the Congo and its tributaries, and proceeded upstream. He noted that up to 4° the river only had relatively small tributaries on its left bank.

Van Gèle reached the foot of the Zongo rapids on 20 October 1886, and docked in Crocodile Bay. For ten days Vangele and Liénart struggled to force the Henry Reed up through one of the five rocky channels, but were defeated and returned down the Ubangi on 4 November 1886. They explored the navigable portions of the Lobay River, Ibenga River and Ngiri River on the way. They returned to Equateurville on 4 December. They reached Léopoldville on 29 December 1886. In February 1887 they used the Henry Reed to explore the Lulonga River and its tributary the Lopori River.

=== Third Ubangi–Uele expedition (1887–1888) ===
On the way back to Léopoldville to organize a new attempt on the Ubangi, Van Gèle met Stanley coming up the river on the Emin Pasha Relief Expedition. Stanley had a letter from Brussels ordering Van Gele to try to reach the upper Ubangi by way of the Itimbiri River and Djabir. On 1 July Van Gèle left Léopoldville on the A.I.A. and the Henry Reed with Liénart and Francis Dhanis, towing barges carrying 100 soldiers. He landed Dhanis at the Bangala station, then went up the Itimbiri to the Gô rapids. From there he tried to clear a road through the forest to the north, but gave up when it seemed impossible to make progress. He returned to the Équateur post on 11 March 1887, where he gave the Henry Reed back to the missionaries. Van Gèle then went to meet governor-General Camille Janssen in Boma, who authorized an expedition towards the Uele by the Ubangi. He left Léopoldville on the En-Avant towing a large pirogue from the Falls to make his another attempt on the Ubangi, again with Liénart. They reached Zongo on 21 November 1887.

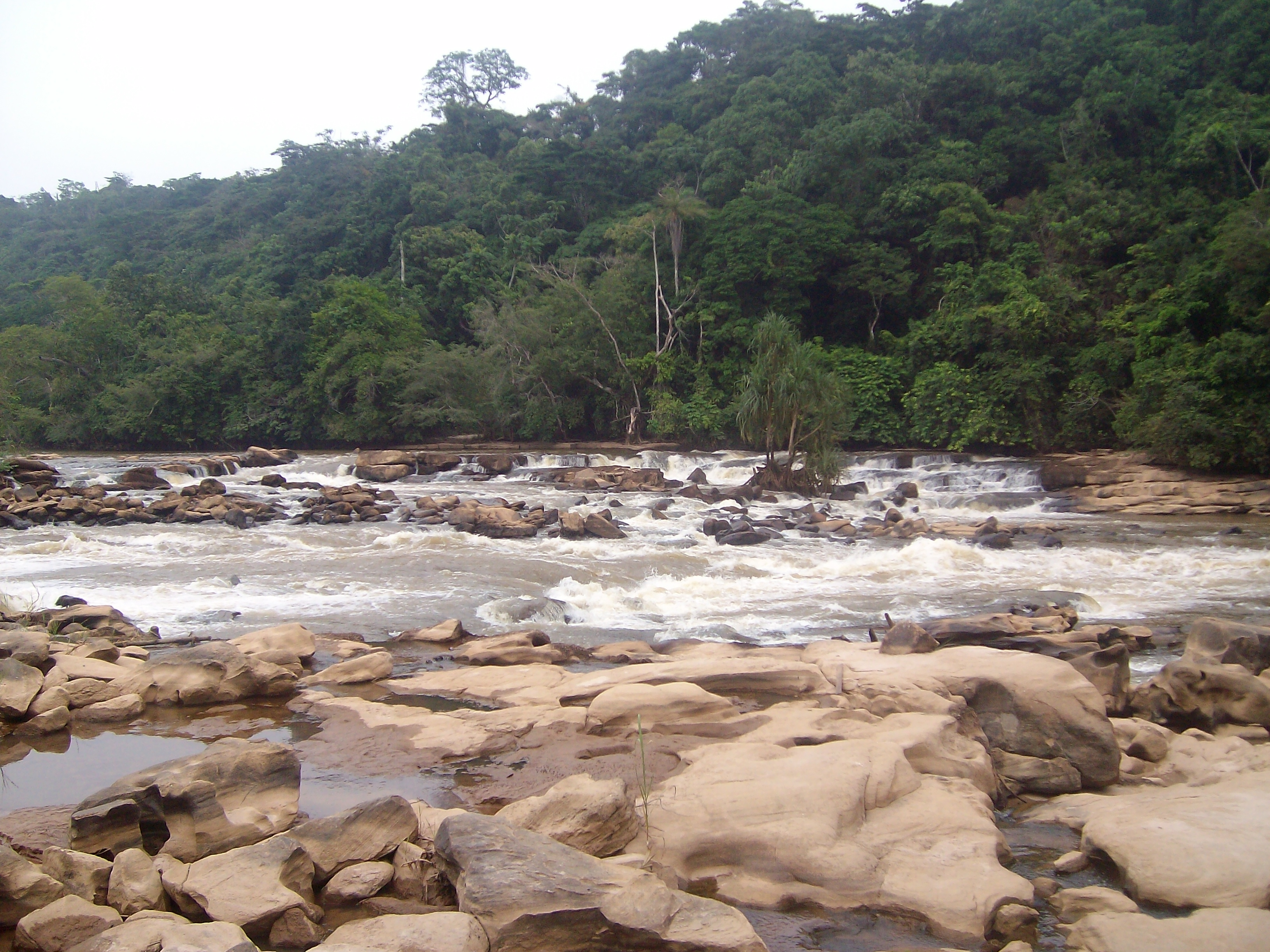
Zongo falls

It was still not possible to pass the rapids, so Van Gèle decided to clear a road through the forest, disassemble the steamer, carry it round the rapids, and then reassemble it. While this was being done, he went by pirogue up to the Bonga rapids, which he decided the steamer could pass. After he returned the steamer was brought round the Zongo falls and relaunched. It passed the Bonga rapids without difficulty, and passed the Buzy rapids with the help of cables. On 1 January 1888 the steamer reached the region of the hostile Yakoma people. The Yakoma population thought the Belgians were Sudanese merchants. Lieutenant Liénart was attacked, and the Belgians fought back and burned the village. The expedition was now at the point where the Mbomou River joins the Uele to form the Ubangi. Van Gèle decided that the larger of the two rivers was the Uele River described by Schweinfurth, and that the geographer Wauters was correct.

During a forced halt to repair the steamer, the expedition was attacked by the Yakomis in a flotilla of pirogues but managed to fight them off. Van Gele returned to Equateurville on 1 February 1888, then continued to Léopoldville. He was charged with leading the expedition to Stanley Falls that Lieven Van de Velde had prepared before dying. The expedition was to supply and reorganize the station at the Falls. It left Léopoldville on 28 April 1888 and took possession of the Falls station on 15 June 1888. The station, which Stanley had established on Usuma Island, was rebuilt on the right bank of the Congo downstream from the island. Van Gèle returned on the steamer Le Stanley. He passed lieutenant Louis Haneuse, who was going to take command at the Falls. He reached Léopoldville on 12 July 1888, and on 15 September 1888 returned to Belgium.

=== Fourth Ubangi–Uele expedition (1889–1891) ===
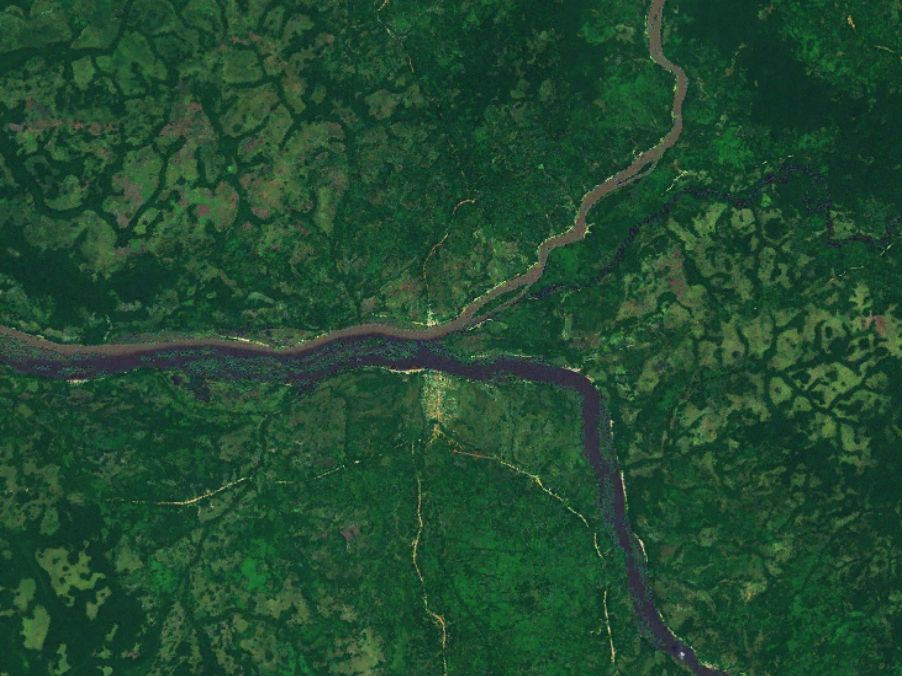
Confluence of the Uelle and Mbomou rivers. Yakoma is the light area on the left (south) bank of the combined stream.

In January 1889 the king gave Van Gèle a mission to further explore the Ubangi and its tributaries. He left Antwerp on 6 February 1889 with the rank of State Inspector. His expedition left Léopoldville on 21 May 1889 on the En avant and the Association internationale Africaine. The expedition reached Zongo on 25 June 1889, where a station was founded as a base of operations with Captain Léon Hanolet in command. The Association internationale Africaine was almost lost in the Zongo rapids. In September 1889 they reached what would become Banzyville. They established a post here, 300 kilometres (190 mi) above Zongo, and sub-lieutenant Léon Busine was put in command. Van Gèle and Georges Le Marinel studied the north shore of the river between Banzyville and Mokoangai and discovered the mouths of the Kuanga and Benghi rivers.

On 7 December 1889 Van Gèle started a new exploration further up the Ubangi. He explored the lower course of the right tributary Kotto River, which he reached on 12 December 1889. He returned downstream to Banzyville, which he reached in January 1890. He left there on 11 May 1890, and reached the mouth of the Kotto at Bendé on 29 May 1890. He went up this river and signed treaties with the local chiefs. Van Gèle returned to the junction of the Bomu, the Mbomo river described by Wilhelm Junker, and the large Koyou river coming from the southeast, which was Junker's Makoua and Schweinfurth's Uele. He founded a large station at the juncture of the two rivers, and placed Edouard De Rechter in command. At about 23° longitude the river was blocked by a series of rocky obstacles that the steamers could not pass. The water level rose in July and the steamers entered the Uele, but at 22°04' longitude they were blocked by impassible rapids. Van Gèle continued by pirogue, passing the rapids at Banafia and Bogazo, but could not pass the Mokwangou falls. After returning to the Yakoma camp, Van Gèle decided to explore the Bomu river and visit Bangassou, but the steamers were blocked after a day by the Goui falls. Bangassou came to visit Van Gèle, who then returned to Banzyville.

On 27 May 1890 the expedition of Léon Roget and Jules Alexandre Milz reached the Uele River opposite the Djabir village. Sultan Djabir signed a treaty with Milz and a post was established on the site of the former Egyptian zeriba of Deleb. Milz began construction of the station while Roget, guided by Sultan Djabir, tried unsuccessfully to join Van Gèle in Yakoma. In July–August 1890 Milz and his assistant Mahutte and Sultan Djabir led 100 fusiliers and 400 lancers in an attempt to push through the non-submissive people along the right bank, but were forced to return to Djabir after nine days.

Van Gèle from a 1908 biography

Van Gèle heard of the presence of a European in Djabir on 18 November 1890 and set out via a roundabout route up the Uele, reaching the village of Gamanza on 2 December. The next day he met Milz, who was coming to meet him. This resolved the Ubangi-Uele question. (Note: It had earlier been thought possible that the Uele might feed the Benue River or perhaps Lake Chad, but now it was thought likely that it was the upper part of the Ubangi. Milz and Van Gèle showed that was the case.) Milz and Van Gèle heard that the Arabs were operating in the lower Bima River and on the Rubi River and set out for that region. In December 1890 they succeeded in expelling the Muslim traders. Van Gèle then returned down the Uele to the post at Yakoma, mapping the river to its junction with the Bomu. With the French established on the upper Ubangi, Van Gele began to conclude increasing numbers of treaties. In November 1891 he handed over to Georges Le Marinel and left for Europe. He returned to Europe on 15 January 1892.

== Later career ==
In July 1895 news arrived of the first mutinies in Luluabourg. Van Gèle offered to help, and his services were accepted, but before he could embark news came that another commander had been appointed in Boma to lead the troops to suppress the revolt. In December 1897 Van Gele was appointed Deputy Governor General to replace Francis Dhanis as Commander in Chief of the Arab Zone. Dhanis's vanguard had revolted during the Haut-Ituri expedition due to bad treatment of the Force Publique troops by their Belgian officers. The mutiny developed into the widespread Batetela rebellion, a resistance movement against the Belgian occupation. Van Gele reached Stanley Falls in March 1898, but due to poor communication did not gain overall command until September 1898. The next month he fell ill, and had to hand command back to Dhanis and return to Europe.

He reached Europe on 10 January 1899, and retired from the army as a lieutenant colonel. Van Gèle became involved as director of various colonial companies including the Compagnie du Katanga, Compagnie Bruxelloise du Commerce du Haut-Congo, Compagnie du Kasai, Cotonco, Ciments du Katanga, Minière AruwimiIturi, Safricas, Manucongo, Minière de Luebo, Minière de la Lueta, Kilo-Moto and Banque du Congo Belge. He died in Brussels on 23 February 1939.

== Sources ==
- Bentley, W. Holman, Reverend (1886), Dictionary and Grammar of the Kongo Language (PDF), London: Baptist Missionary Society
- Bradshaw, Richard; Fandos-Rius, Juan (27 May 2016), Historical Dictionary of the Central African Republic, Rowman & Littlefield Publishers, ISBN 978-0-8108-7992-8
- Coosemans, M. (20 May 1946), "MILZ (Jules-Alexandre)", Biographie Belge d'Outre-Mer (in French), vol. I, Académie Royale des Sciences d'Outre-Mer, pp. 697–701
- Coosemans, M. (21 May 1948), "CASMAN (Guillaume-Camille)" (PDF), Biographie Belge d'Outre-Mer (in French), vol. II, Académie Royale des Sciences d'Outre-Mer, pp. 143–147
- Coosemans, M. (1 February 1949), "WESTER (Arvid-Mauritz)", Biographie Coloniale Belge, vol. II, Inst. roy. colon. belge, pp. col. 975–977
- Engels, A. (1946), "HANSSENS (Edmond-Winnie-Victor", Biographie Coloniale Belge, vol. I, Institut royal colonial belge, pp. 479–493
- Engels, A. (1951), "Vangele (Alphonse)" (PDF), Biographie Coloniale Belge, vol. 2, Institut royal colonial belge, pp. 928–37
- Janssens, Édouard; Cateaux, Albert (1908), Les Belges au Congo: notices biographiques, Antwerp: J. van Hille-De Backer, pp. 167–182
- Lotar, R. P. L. (1937), La Grande Chronique de l'Ubangi (PDF), Institut Royal Colonial Beige
- Morren, Tom (2014), Inventaire des archives d'Alphonse Vangele 1848 - 1939 (PDF) (in Dutch), Tervuren: Koninklijk Museum voor Midden-Afrika
- Omasombo Tshonda, Jean, ed. (2016), Équateur : Au cœur de la cuvette congolaise (PDF), Musée royal de l’Afrique centrale, ISBN 978-9-4922-4423-9
- "Vangele, Alphonse", Africamuseum.be (in French)
