= En Avant (steam launch) =

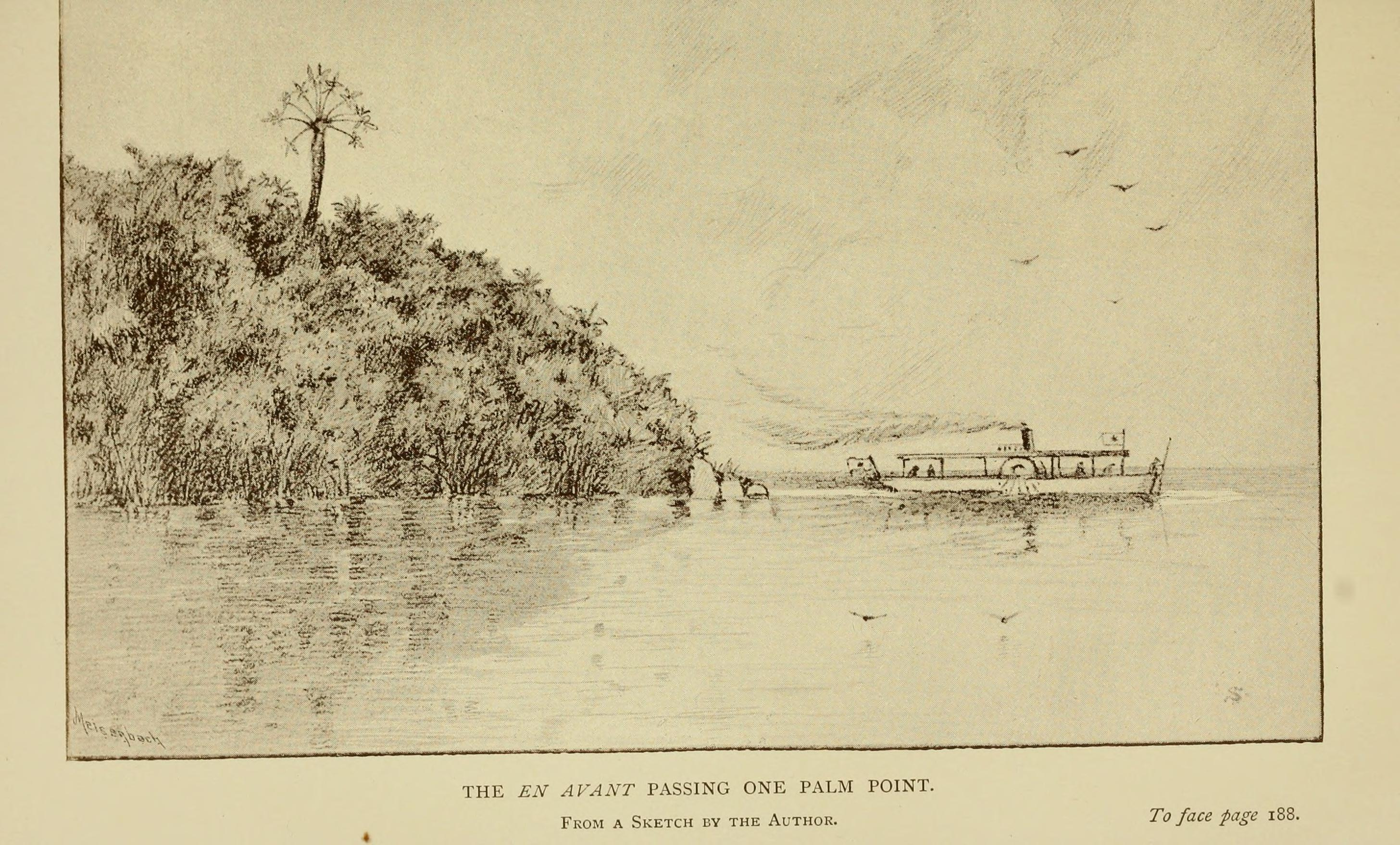
- En Avant on the Congo River 1889

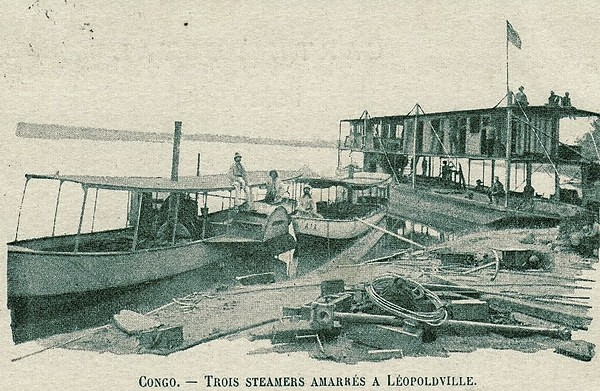
- En Avant (L), A.I.A. (C) and Roi des Belges (R) — Leopoldville, 1889

History
- Name: En Avant
- Owner: Association International du Congo
- Route: Congo River and tributaries

General characteristics
- Type: Steam launch
- Length: 43 feet (13 m)
- Beam: 7 feet 11 inches (2.41 m)
- Draught: 11 inches (280 mm)
- Installed power: nominal 6 horsepower.

Congo Free State locations visited by the En Avant. For rivers, shows location of the mouth.

The En Avant (Forward) was a small steam launch used in the early days of European exploration of the Congo River basin. It was carried in sections past the cataracts of the lower Congo, reassembled at Stanley Pool (Pool Malebo) and launched in December 1881, the first powered vessel on the long navigable section between the cataracts and the Stanley Falls (Boyoma Falls). In the years that followed it played an important role in exploring the Congo river system and carrying Europeans up and down the river and the tributaries as they established trading stations. The steel side-wheel paddle steamer was built in Belgium by John Cockerill for the International Association of the Congo.

== Construction ==
The En Avant was a steel side-wheel paddle steamer. She was built in Belgium by John Cockerill for the International Association of the Congo (AIA). She weighed 9 tons. The loading capacity was 5 tons. She was 43 feet (13 m) long, 7 feet 11 inches (2.41 m) wide and had a draft of 11 inches (280 mm). The engine had a nominal 6 horsepower. The boat was painted gray, and had a striped awning fringed with red.

The steam boiler, engine and wheels were in the center of the boat, with the rudder in front of the machine. The crew and African passengers occupied the front, with a large space for storing wood and some space for goods. The Europeans travelled in the rear section, with an open kitchen, table and couches that could be used for beds. Sails were suspended from the roof to form the cabin walls. Henry Morton Stanley wrote in 1885,

The En Avant was guilty of extraordinary freaks, and as stubborn as the donkey is generally supposed to be. At one moment she had over ten atmospheres of steam, and rushed madly on, while we, expectantly watching the first signs of an explosion, were ready to jump overboard, but suddenly the gauge indicated descent, and the paddle-wheels could scarcely revolve, while the rudder never had the slightest control of her movements...

... The fourth mechanician was an Italian named Francesco Flamini, a quiet, painstaking man ... he said "I will make this steamer travel as quickly as any other," and—to cut the story short—he did. He merely shifted the firebars higher up, and kept a regular supply of water in the boiler. Ever afterwards she performed her duty. She travelled to Vivi, breasted boldly the rapids above Manyanga, pioneered the way to Lake Léopold II, and was the first to cleave the waters of the Biyeré [Aruwimi], and the first to steam up to Stanley Falls. Oh, an epic poem might now be written of the brave little boat!

== Delivery (1879–1881) ==
The En Avant was one of two steamers brought from Europe in 1879 in portable sections, the other being the Royal. They were assembled at Banana and steamed up the river to Boma, and from there to Vivi. Between February 1880 and February 1881 a wagon trail was made from Vivi to Isangila, past the lower cataracts of the Congo River, a very laborious process. The steamer hulls were mounted in one piece on large steel wagons drawn by 150 to 200 Zanzibari and Loango men, while other wagons carried boilers, machinery and equipment. They had to cross rivers, build bridges, level the terrain, clear forests, climb hills and blow up rocks with dynamite.

Louis Valcke met Stanley, the expedition leader, at Ngoma in November 1880 and was told to build a road that would pass the foot of the Ngoma plateau . Valcke used explosives to blast rocks from the mountain, which combined with tree trunks were used to build the 1,500 metres (4,900 ft) "Valcke's causeway" from Ngoma to N'Konzo. By 30 December the expedition had made camp 0.75 miles (1.21 km) from Isangila, and the steamers were in a cove from which a road could be made to haul them up to their launching place The boats were on shore in the camp on 2 January 1881 to be repaired, scraped and painted in readiness for the journey to Manyanga.

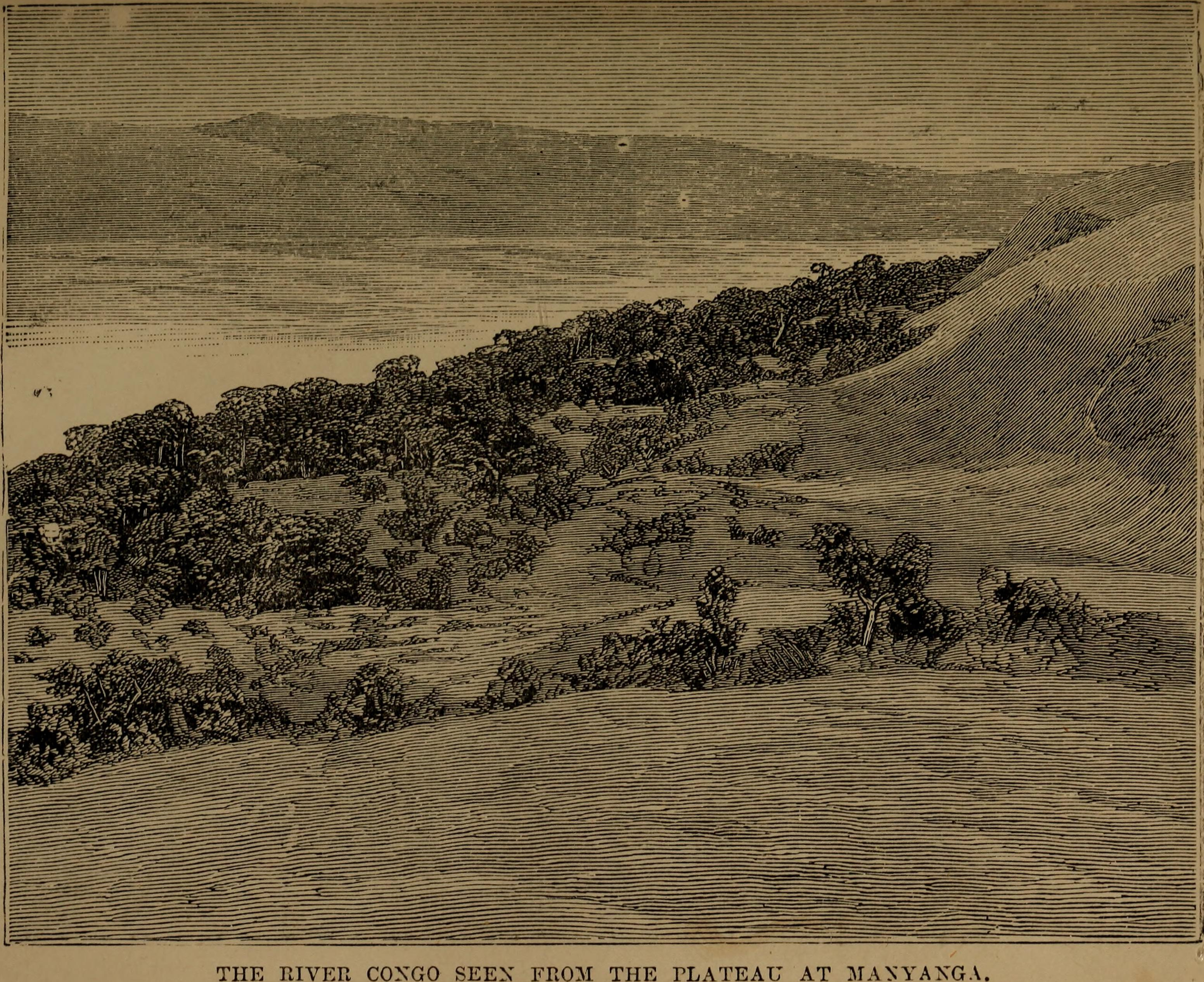
The River Congo seen from the plateau at Manyanga

While Valcke developed the Isangila post, Stanley took the steamers En Avant and Royal up the navigable stretch of the river to Manyanga, where he started to build a post, which he entrusted to Victor Harou. He charged Charles-Marie de Braconnier with building a road from Manianga to the mouth of the Lufu River, bypassing the Ntombo-Mataka falls. In May 1881 Stanley fell ill with a serious fever at Manyanga. He was not able to consider moving on to Stanley Pool until mid-June. Valcke joined Stanley in Manianga on 14 July 1881. They left the next day with a contingent of native auxiliaries along the route marked out by Braconnier carrying the En Avant and two whalers they intended to launch at the Stanley Pool. They reached the Gordon-Bennett River (Note: Gordon-Bennett River: Stanley named the river after James Gordon Bennett Jr., the editor of the New York Herald who had sponsored his explorations. Today it is the Djoué River.) (Djoué River) without difficulty. There they were informed that Pierre Savorgnan de Brazza had signed a treaty with Chief Makoka and claimed possession for France of the whole right shore of the Congo River north of the Pool.

The Belgians established a camp on the right bank of the Djoué, and on 3 August 1881 Stanley asked Valcke to return to the coast and try to catch the boat due on 20 August 1881 from Banana to St-Paul de Loanda, He should bring back trade goods to win the chief Ngaliéma over to the AIA. Stanley went on the Stanley Pool about the end of July 1881, where he found an agent of Brazza who claimed that a chief named Makako had sold the land to the north of the river to the French. The explorers met various other chiefs in different locations near the Pool, and came close to an agreement to found a post at Ntamo in the territory of Chief Ngaliéma. Stanley returned to collect the En Avant.

On 14 September 1881 the column set off again, but Stanley fell ill again. Captain Braconnier once again had to take command of the expedition. The last part of the portage was extremely difficult. The steamer was carried to Stanley Pool in three sections on wagons. (Note: Two more steamers were carried to Stanley Pool in sections, after which it was decided to send the materials, machinery and plates in small pieces that could be carried on men's shoulders, and to assemble the boats at the Pool. This proved much more practical.) While the porters were hoisting the equipment in steep terrain, one of the wagons fell violently hitting Braconnier who was thrown into the rocks. He lost consciousness, but recovered and found he was covered with bruises, but without any fractures. However, he had to recover for a few weeks in a hut on the banks of the Congo River. Then, on 1 October 1881 he joined Stanley on the left bank of the river, in the district of Kinsinde. The En Avant arrived at the Pool in November 1881. Stanley founded the station of Léopoldville (Kinshasa) beside Stanley Pool, where he built a house and began gardens. The steamer was assembled and launched on 3 December 1881.

== Explorations ==
=== Stanley (1882) ===
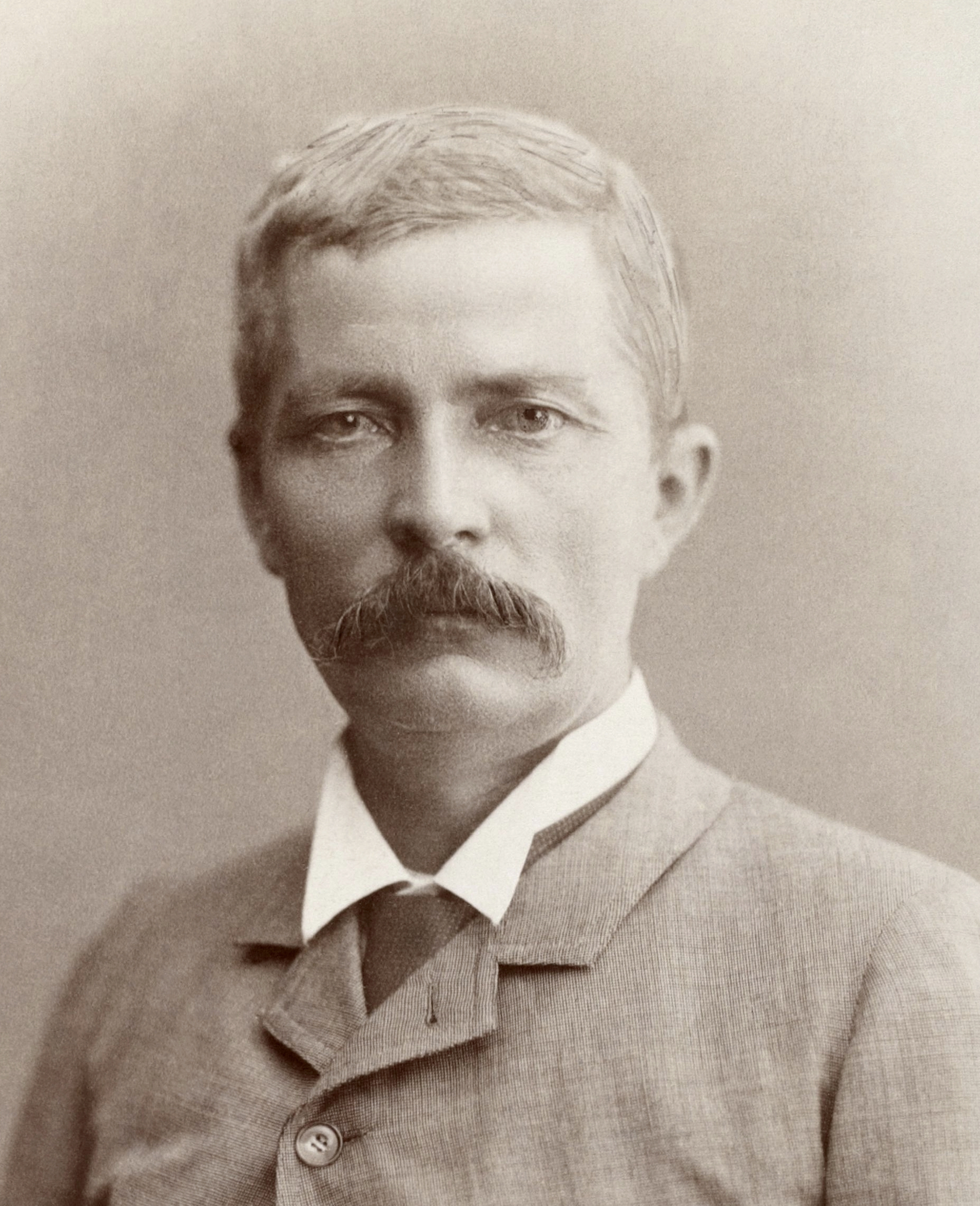
Henry Morton Stanley (1841–1904) in 1884

In April 1882 Stanley left for the Upper Congo in the En Avant, going up to Mwata, where he founded a station. The Belgians suffered from the heat of the boiler combined with the heat of the sun, which penetrated the canvas walls. Their boxes and bundles made most uncomfortable seats. Stanley returned to Léopoldville, then set off again past Mwata to the Kwah (Kasai), a tributary of the Congo. He went up this river to Lake Léopold II (Lake Mai-Ndombe), which he circumnavigated. He fell ill and returned downstream en route for Europe. At Vivi he met Dr. Eduard Pechuël-Loesche, to whom he handed over command.

Edmond Hanssens was given command of the Bas-Congo region and arrived in Léopoldville on 3 September 1882. On 17 December 1882 Nicolas Grang tried out the steamer En Avant, with captain G.-H. Vandevelde, but without success. The steam inlet valve had somehow been removed and the tubes carrying steam to the cylinders leaked badly. The essential component would only be found when Stanley returned.

=== Stanley (1883–1884) ===
In May 1883 Alphonse van Gèle and Camille Coquilhat were appointed to accompany Stanley in his expedition to the Upper Congo. The expedition left Léopoldville on 9 May 1883 with all their steamers: En Avant, Eclaireur, Royal and A.I.A.. The expedition had seven Europeans and 67 Africans. Stanley reached the mouth of the Ruki River on 9 June 1883 and directed Van Gèle and Coquilhat to build a station there. It was called Equator Station, or Station de l'Équateur, then Equateurville, later Coquilhatville, today Mbandaka.

While the Équateur station was being built, Stanley explored the Lulonga River and Lake Tumba. On 23 June 1883 Stanley steamed up the Lukanga River, which led into Lake Mantumba (Lake Tumba). He circumnavigated the shallow lake, a distance of 144 miles (232 km). He returned to Leopoldville, then immediately left for the Falls. He returned to Équateurville, where he praised the station, the discipline of the soldiers and the good but not over-familiar relations with the local people.

=== Hanssens (1884) ===
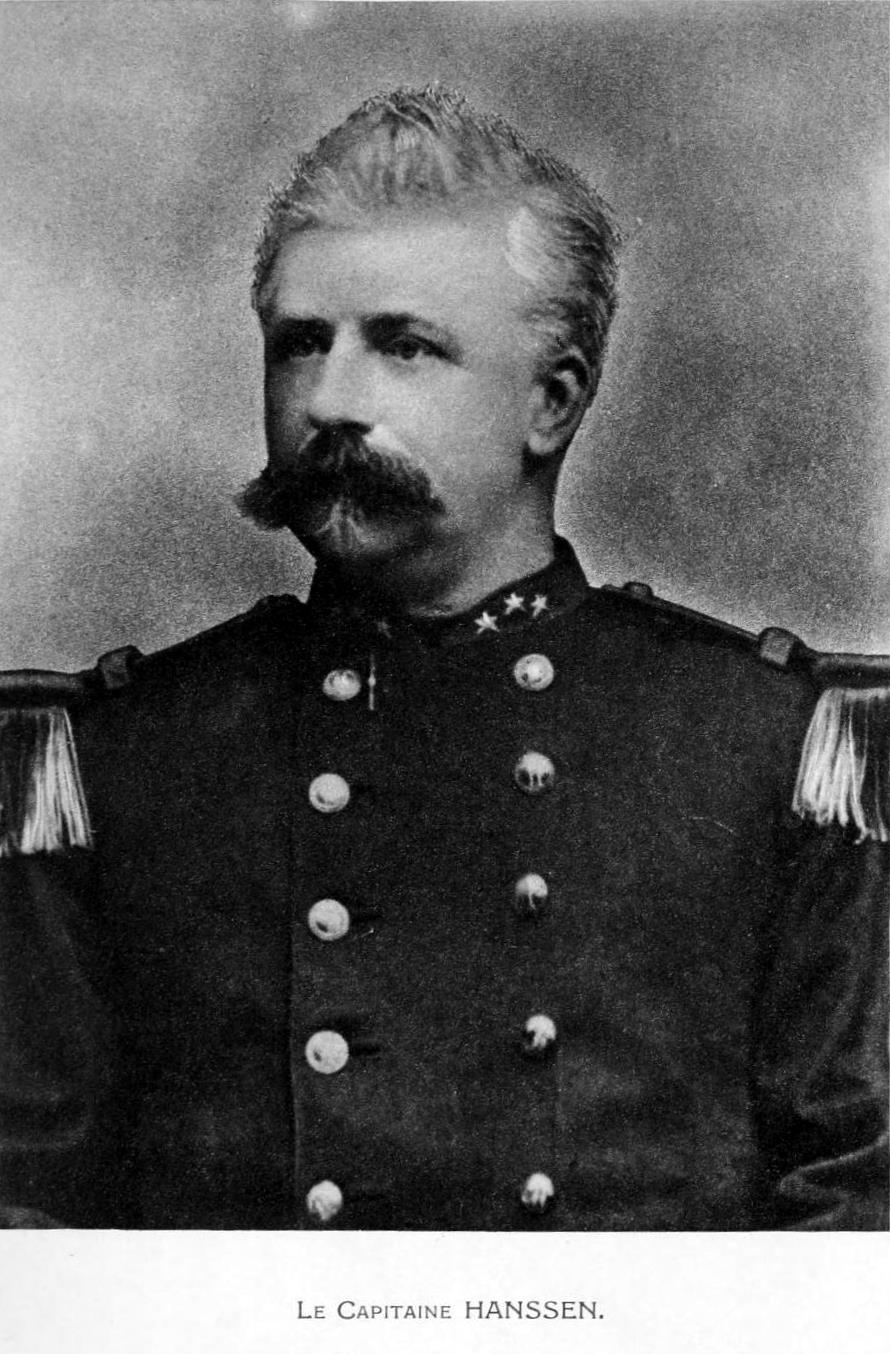
Edmond Hanssens (1843–1884)

On 15 February 1884 Hanssens met Stanley in Léopoldville and was directed to establish presence in the region between Équateur and the Falls. Hanssens organized an expedition with three small steamers with a total of about 20 tons: the En-Avant, A.I.A. and Royal, and a few small sailboats. There were seven Belgians, about fifty Africans and large amounts of goods and supplies. Hanssens reached Équateurville on 17 April 1884 with the three steamers and six Europeans, Wester, Amelot, Drees, Guérin, Courtois and Nicholls.

At the suggestion of Van Gele and Coquihat, Hanssens interrupted his journey to explore the mouth of the Ubangi River He left in the En Avant on 19 April 1884 with Van Gèle, Courtois, Guérin and Amelot, ten Zanzibaris and one local African as an interpreter. Going downstream the steamer skirted the right bank of the Congo River, but was carried by the current into a maze of islands. After three days they saw some native fishermen in a canoe. Van Gèle managed to persuade them to act as pilots, and after four hours of full steam on 21 April 1884 entered a strong stream of yellow water, the Ubangi, which they ascended to the Bisongo village. After returning to Equateurville Hanssens left Van Gèle in charge and took Coquihat with him to found the Bangala station, the future Nouvelle Anvers.

On return to Équateur, Hanssens made careful preparation for his expedition to the Bangalas, where he expected to place Coquilhat in command of a new station. The flotilla reached Luluonga on 27 April 1884, where the chiefs signed treaties. On 4 May 1884 it reached Makanza, where the local people were distrustful of the Belgians, having had a bad experience with Stanley. Hanssens landed first, armed only with his pipe and tobacco pouch, and walked through the crowd of armed men to the chief, whom he shook by the hand. This broke the ice, and the chief proposed that they become blood brothers, which was done. Hanssens left for Équateur on 11 May 1884 to obtain more supplies for his journey to the Falls, and returned to Iboko on 24 May 1884, where Coquilhat was organizing the post.

Hanssens left the next day, and briefly explored the Mongala River, signing a treaty with Chief Mobeka near its mouth. On 4 June 1884 the expedition reached the Itimbiri River, and went up it for 15 kilometres (9.3 mi). On 21 June 1884 it reached Basoko at the mouth of the Aruwimi River, where a post of three Hausas was established. The expedition reached the Falls on 3 July 1884, and left on 11 July 1884. Hanssens returned downstream along the left bank, and entered the Lomami River. He landed at Iboko on 19 July 1884. The people there were suspicious, and he stayed for a few days to reassure them that the Belgians wanted friendship with all the tribes, but would not side with one against another.

Hanssens left Iboko on 22 July 1884, and returned to Léopoldville on 6 August 1884. He met the Association's general administrator, Sir Francis de Winton, in Léopoldville. He requested and received the emergency dispatch of supplies and reinforcements for the Bangalas. He then returned upstream to obtain new treaties to confirm the rights of the Association over all the territory between Kwamouth and Bolobo. Hanssens left Léopoldville for Belgium on 8 November after dividing his command into two regions. Guillaume Casman was given the territory from the Pool to Equateur, while Van Gèle took the territory from there to the Falls.

=== Casman (1884) ===
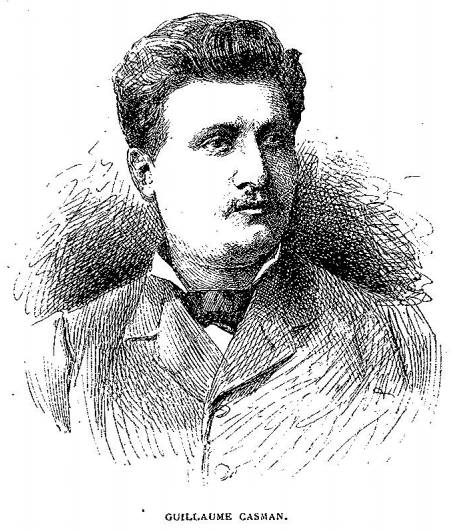
Guillaume Casman (1854–1885)

On 11 November 1884 Casman left for Équateur in an expedition with three steamers: the Royal, A.I.A. and En Avant. The members included Casman, Charles Liebrechts and Camille Van den Plas. They stopped at Kimpoko to embark the Swedish lieutenant Edde Gleerup, who had been appointed second to Wester at the Falls. On 24 November 1884 they reached Msuata. Casman arrived at Equateur Station on 12 December 1884, where Van Gèle handed over command in a ceremony before the native chiefs.

=== Van Gèle (1884–1885) ===
Van Gèle left for a visit to the Falls accompanied by the intendant Van den Plas and Gleerup. Well before reaching the Aruwimi River he noticed that the local people had been terrorized by a recent attack by the Arabs against the Basokos. The expedition continued on to Stanley Falls. Soon after the expedition reached the Falls, Tippu Tip visited Van Gèle and assured him he wanted cordial relations with the Europeans and would stop hunting for slaves. Van Gèle thought it was better to try to use Arab power to help the Belgians get established, as did Hanssens and Coquilhat. He left Lieutenant Gleerup at the Falls with Tippo-Tip to support Lieutenant Arvid Wester.

Hermann Wissmann and Ludwig Wolf used the En Avant to explore the Sankuru River in 1885–1886.

Stanley was charged with leading the Emin Pasha Relief Expedition, which was to travel up the Congo River and overland to Equatoria rather than take the shorter route from the east coast. He met Anthony Swinburne in Paris in late January 1887. Swinburne was returning to the Congo from leave. He explained to Stanley how run down the king's flotilla had become, and hinted that he might lend him the company steamer Florida. When Stanley reached Boma he was told by Louis Valcke that the largest steamer, the Stanley, was damaged, the En Avant had no engine and the Royal was rotten. On 1 April 1887 Swinburne lent Stanley the Florida for use as a barge, despite knowing his boss Sanford would be furious about the loan.

=== Van Gèle (1887–1888) ===
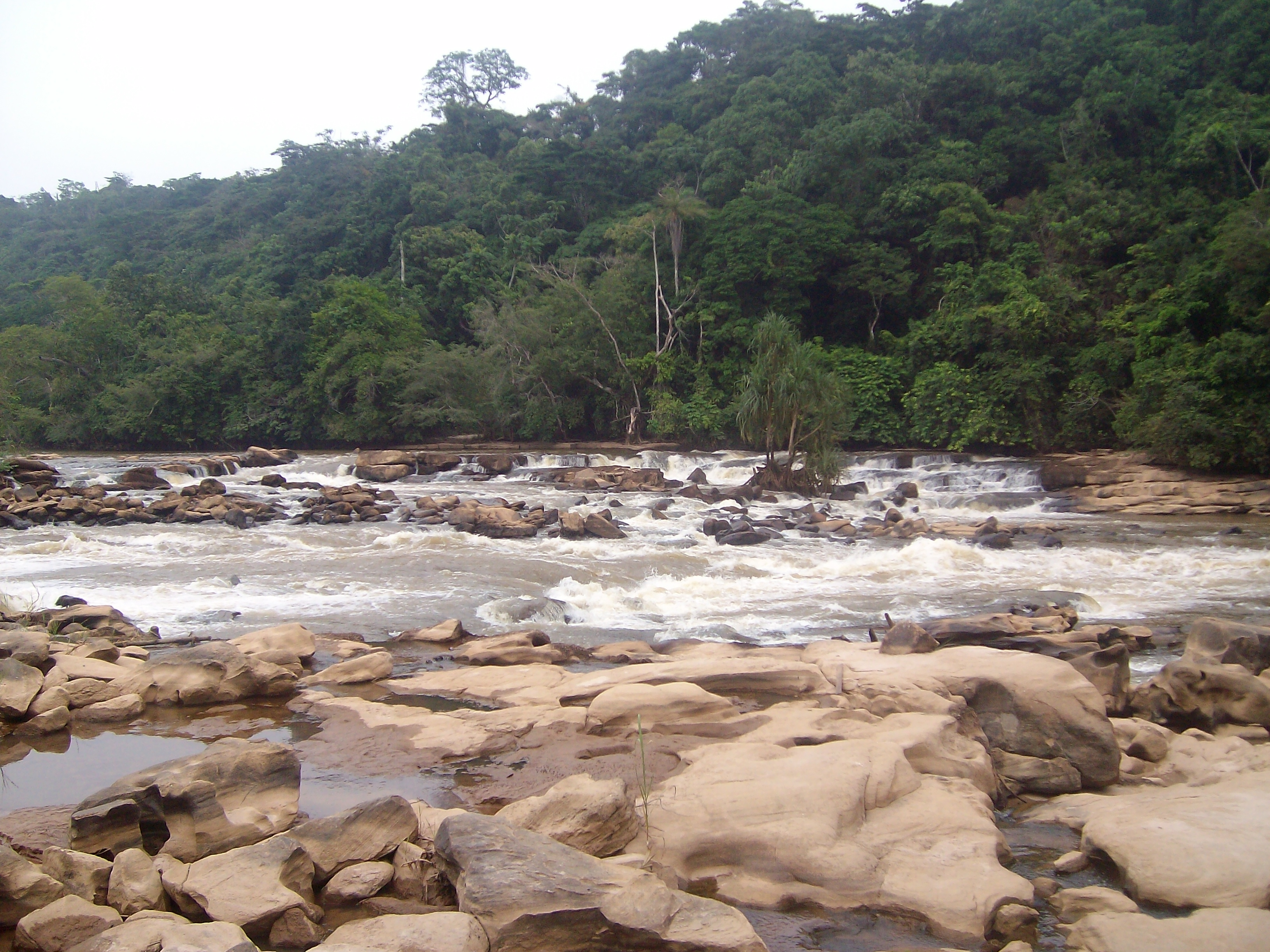
Zongo falls

Later in 1887 Alphonse van Gèle left Léopoldville on the En-Avant towing a large pirogue from the Falls to make his second attempt on the Ubangi, again with Liénart. They reached Zongo on 21 November 1887. It was not possible to pass the rapids, so Van Gèle decided to clear a road through the forest, disassemble the steamer, carry it round the rapids, and then reassemble it. While this was being done, he went by pirogue up to the Bonga rapids, which he decided the steamer could pass. After he returned the steamer was brought round the Zongo falls and relaunched. It passed the Bonga rapids without difficulty, and passed the Buzy rapids with the help of cables. On 1 January 1888 the steamer reached the region of the hostile Yakoma people. The Yakoma population thought the Belgians were Sudanese merchants. Lieutenant Liénart was attacked, and the Belgians fought back and burned the village. The expedition was now at the point where the Mbomou River joins the Uele River to form the Ubangi. During a forced halt to repair the En Avant the expedition was attacked by the Yakomis in a flotilla of pirogues but managed to fight them off. Van Gele returned to Equateurville on 1 February 1888, then continued to Léopoldville.

=== Van Gèle (1889–1890) ===
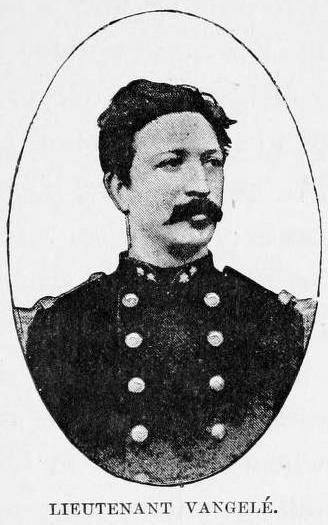
Alphonse van Gèle (1848–1939)

In January 1889 the king gave Van Gèle a mission to further explore the Ubangi and its tributaries. He left Antwerp on 6 February 1889 with the rank of State Inspector. His expedition left Léopoldville on 21 May 1889 on the En Avant and the Association internationale Africaine. The expedition reached Zongo on 25 June 1889, where a station was founded as a base of operations with Captain Léon Hanolet in command. The Association Internationale Africaine was almost lost in the Zongo rapids. In September 1889 they reached what would become Banzyville. They established a post here, 300 kilometres (190 mi) above Zongo, and sub-lieutenant Léon Busine was put in command. Van Gèle and Georges Le Marinel studied the north shore of the river between Banzyville and Mokoangai and discovered the mouths of the Kuanga and Benghi rivers.

On 7 December 1889 Van Gèle started a new exploration further up the Ubangi. He explored the lower course of the right tributary Kotto River, which he reached on 12 December 1889. He returned downstream to Banzyville, which he reached in January 1890. He left there on 11 May 1890, and reached the mouth of the Kotto at Bendé on 29 May 1890. He went up this river and signed treaties with the local chiefs. Van Gèle returned to the junction of the Bomu, the Mbomo river described by Wilhelm Junker, and the large Koyou river coming from the southeast, which was Junker's Makoua and Schweinfurth's Uele. He founded a large station at the juncture of the two rivers. At about 22°28' longitude the river was blocked by a series of rocky obstacles that the steamers could not pass. The water level rose in July and the steamers entered the Uele, but at 22°40' longitude they were blocked by impassible rapids. Van Gèle continued by pirogue, passing the rapids at Banafia and Bogazo, but could not pass the Mokwangou falls. After returning to the Yakoma camp, Van Gèle decided to explore the Bomu river and visit Bangassou, but the steamers were blocked after a day by the Goui falls. Bangassou came to visit Van Gèle, who then returned to Banzyville.

On 27 May 1890 the expedition of Léon Roget and Jules Alexandre Milz reached the Uele River opposite the Djabir village. Sultan Djabir signed a treaty with Milz and a post was established on the site of the former Egyptian zeriba of Deleb. Roget, guided by Sultan Djabir, tried unsuccessfully to join Van Gèle in Yakoma. Van Gèle heard of the presence of a European in Djabir on 18 November 1890 and set out via a roundabout route up the Uele, reaching the village of Gamanza on 2 December. The next day he met Milz, who was coming to meet him. Together they reached Djabir on 6 January 1891. On 15 January Van Gèle descended the Uele and reached Yakoma on 20 January 1891. This resolved the Ubangi-Uele question. (Note: It had earlier been thought possible that the Uele might feed the Benue River or perhaps Lake Chad, but now it was thought likely that it was the upper part of the Ubangi. Milz and Van Gèle showed that was the case.) In November 1891 Van Gele handed over to Georges Le Marinel and left for Europe.

== Sources ==
- Altic, Mirela Slukan (2005), Henry Morton Stanley – Exploration and Mapping of the Congo River (1874-1877) (PDF)
- Boelaert, E. (1952), "Equateurville", Aequatoria (in French), 15e Année (1), Honoré Vinck: 1–12, JSTOR 25838164
- Coosemans, M. (20 May 1946), "MILZ (Jules-Alexandre)", Biographie Belge d'Outre-Mer (in French), vol. I, Académie Royale des Sciences d'Outre-Mer, pp. 697–701
- Coosemans, M. (21 May 1948), "CASMAN (Guillaume-Camille)" (PDF), Biographie Belge d'Outre-Mer (in French), vol. II, Académie Royale des Sciences d'Outre-Mer, pp. 143–147
- Coosemans, M. (1948b), "BRACONNIER (Charles-Marie)" (PDF), Biographie Coloniale Belge (in French), vol. I, Inst. roy. colon. belge, pp. col.155–160
- Coosemans, M. (1 February 1949), "WESTER (Arvid-Mauritz)", Biographie Coloniale Belge, vol. II, Inst. roy. colon. belge, pp. col. 975–977
- Coosemans, Marthe (20 January 1953), "VALCKE (Louis Pierre Alphonse)", Biographie Coloniale Belge, vol. V, Inst. roy. colon. belge
- Engels, A. (23 December 1946), "HANSSENS (Edmond-Winnie-Victor)", Biographie Coloniale Belge, vol. I, Inst. roy. colon. belge, pp. col. 479–493
- Engels, A. (1951), "Vangele (Alphonse)" (PDF), Biographie Coloniale Belge, vol. 2, Institut royal colonial belge, pp. 928–37
- Gelade, Valérie (2002), "Les débuts de la navigation à vapeur sur le Haut-Congo (1882-1898)" (PDF), Journal of Belgian History (BTNG-RBHC) (in French), vol. XXXII, no. 3–4, pp. 383–418
- Grenfell, George (November 1902), "The Upper Congo as a Waterway", The Geographical Journal, 20 (5), The Royal Geographical Society (with the Institute of British Geographers): 485–498, doi:10.2307/1775115, hdl:2027/uc1.b4517355, JSTOR 1775115
- Guébels, L. (22 May 1947), "GRANG (Nicolas)", Biographie Coloniale Belge (in French), vol. I, Inst. roy. colon. belge, pp. col. 437–440
- Janssens, Édouard; Cateaux, Albert (1908), Les Belges au Congo: notices biographiques, Antwerp: J. van Hille-De Backer, pp. 167–182
- Jeal, Tim (6 October 2011), Stanley: Africa's Greatest Explorer, Faber & Faber, ISBN 978-0-571-26564-0
- Lotar, R. P. L. (1937), La Grande Chronique de l'Ubangi (PDF), Institut Royal Colonial Beige
- Morren, Tom (2014), Inventaire des archives d'Alphonse Vangele 1848 - 1939 (PDF) (in Dutch), Tervuren: Koninklijk Museum voor Midden-Afrika
- Omasombo Tshonda, Jean, ed. (2016), Équateur: Au cœur de la cuvette congolaise (PDF), Musée royal de l'Afrique centrale, ISBN 978-9-4922-4423-9
- Samarin, William J. (11 July 2019), The Black Man's Burden: African Colonial Labor On The Congo And Ubangi Rivers, 1880-1900, Taylor & Francis, ISBN 978-1-00-031491-5
- Stanley, Henry Morton (2011) [1885], The Congo and the Founding of Its Free State: A Story of Work and Exploration, Cambridge University Press, ISBN 978-1-108-03131-8
- Stanley, Henry Morton (2011b) [1885], The Congo and the Founding of Its Free State: A Story of Work and Exploration, vol. 2, Cambridge University Press, ISBN 978-1-108-03131-8
- Vangele, Alphonse (June 1889), "Explorations on the Welle-Mobangi River" (PDF), Proceedings of the Royal Geographical Society and Monthly Record of Geography, 11 (6), Wiley on behalf of The Royal Geographical Society (with the Institute of British Geographers): 325–342, doi:10.2307/1801036, JSTOR 1801036
- Werner, J.R. (1889), A visit to Stanley's rear-guard at Major Barttelot's camp on the Aruhwimi with an account of the river-life on the Congo, Edinburgh: W. Blackwood
