= Georges Le Marinel =

Belgian soldier, engineer, explorer and colonial administrator

Georges-Edouard le Marinel
- Born: 29 June 1860; Davenport, Iowa, United States of America
- Died: 20 November 1914 (aged 54); Edinburgh, Scotland
- Occupations: Soldier, explorer, administrator

Georges-Edouard le Marinel (29 June 1860 – 20 November 1914) was a Belgian soldier, engineer, explorer and colonial administrator. He is known for leading explorations of the country around the Ubangi River and Mbomou River, which later became the boundaries between French and Belgian territory.

== Early years ==
Georges-Edouard le Marinel was born in Davenport, Iowa, United States of America, on 29 June 1860. He was the son of Amédée Le Marinel, a French soldier from Normandy who had joined the Belgian revolutionaries in 1830, and then served for eighteen years in the Belgian army. In 1858 Amédée emigrated to the U.S. and started a farm in Long Grove, Iowa where his two sons, Paul and George, were born. In 1868 the family returned to Belgium. In 1876 Paul Le Marinel enrolled in the military school, graduating in 1878 with the rank of Sergeant. Georges also attended the military school, and in 1879 was promoted to second lieutenant. In 1882 he became a military engineer.

== First Congo tour (1884–1887) ==
Le Marinel was employed by the International Association of the Congo, the precursor of the Congo Free State, and in August 1884 sailed from Liverpool, England for Boma. In 1885 he was a member of the Franco-Belgian commission that defined the border of Bas-Congo. He was then appointed head of the Léopoldville post. On 1 July 1887 he embarked for Europe.

== Second Congo tour (1889–1892) ==
Le Marinel was named district commissioner 2nd class on 28 January 1889, and the next day embarked in Antwerp to return to the Congo via Lisbon. The fourth Ubangi expedition was organized by Alphonse van Gèle. The expedition left Léopoldville on 21 May 1889 in the steamers En Avant and Association internationale Africaine, and a large canoe. It was led by Van Gèle and included Le Marinel, Léon Hanolet, lieutenant Edouard De Rechter and sub-lieutenant Léon Busine.

The expedition reached Zongo on 25 June 1889, where a station was founded as a base of operations with Hanolet in command. The Association internationale Africaine was almost lost in the Zongo rapids. In September 1889 they reached what would become Banzyville. They established a post here, 300 kilometres (190 mi) above Zongo, and sub-lieutenant Léon Busine was put in command. Van Gèle and Le Marinel studied the north shore of the river between Banzyville and Mokoangai and discovered the mouths of the Kuanga and Benghi rivers.

The expedition entered territory claimed by France. On 7 December 1889 Van Gèle started a new exploration further up the Ubangi. He explored the lower course of the right tributary Kotto River, which he reached on 12 December 1889. He returned downstream to Banzyville, which he reached in January 1890. He left there on 11 May 1890, and reached the mouth of the Kotto River at Bendé on 29 May 1890. He went up this river and signed treaties with the local chiefs. Van Gèle returned to the junction of the Bomu, the Mbomo river described by Wilhelm Junker, and the large Koyou river coming from the southeast, which was Junker's Makoua and Schweinfurth's Uele. Le Marinel and Vangèle established the post of Yakoma. The large station was at the juncture of the two rivers, and Edouard De Rechter was placed in command.

At about 23° longitude the Koyou (Uele) river was blocked by a series of rocky obstacles that the steamers could not pass. The water level rose in July and the steamers entered the Uele, but at 22°04' longitude they were blocked by impassible rapids. Van Gèle continued by pirogue, passing the rapids at Banafia and Bogazo, but could not pass the Mokwangou falls. After returning to the Yakoma camp, Van Gèle decided to explore the Bomu river and visit Sultan Bangassou, (Note: At that time a sultan's name was also used for his capital and kingdom, so Sultan Bangassou was based at the town of Bangassou, capital of the Bangassou kingdom.) but the steamers were blocked after a day by the Goui falls. Bangassou came to visit Van Gèle, who then returned to Banzyville.

On 27 May 1890 the expedition of Léon Roget and Jules Alexandre Milz reached the Uele River opposite the Djabir village. Sultan Djabir signed a treaty with Milz and a post was established on the site of the former Egyptian zeriba of Deleb. Milz began construction of the station while Roget, guided by Sultan Djabir, tried unsuccessfully to join Van Gèle in Yakoma. In July–August 1890 Milz and his assistant Mahutte and Sultan Djabir led 100 fusiliers and 400 lancers in an attempt to push through the non-submissive people along the right bank, but were forced to return to Djabir after nine days. Van Gèle heard of the presence of a European in Djabar on 18 November 1890 and set out via a roundabout route up the Uele, reaching the village of Gamanza on 2 December. The next day he met Milz, who was coming to meet him. This resolved the Ubangi-Uele question. (Note: It had earlier been thought possible that the Uele might feed the Benue River or perhaps Lake Chad, but now it was thought likely that it was the upper part of the Ubangi. Milz and Van Gèle showed that was the case.)

With the French established on the upper Ubangi, Van Gele began to conclude increasing numbers of treaties. In November 1891 he handed over to Georges Le Marinel and left for Europe. Le Marinal met Sultan Bangassou, then travelled up the Mbari River where he established the Bakouma post. Bakouma was founded in September 1892 when the Belgians, led by Commander Georges Adolphe Balat and Captain Le Marinel set up a military post on the site. Le Marinel reached the territory of Sultan Rafaï. He went back to Europe in 1892. He was replaced by Georges Adolphe Balat. Balat died on 19 April 1893 leaving Hanolet in charge of the Upper Ubangi and Mbomou.

== Third Congo tour (1893–1895) ==
In November 1893 Le Marinel, now a state inspector, resumed command of Haut-Ubanghi-Mbomou. On 6 July 1893 Théodore Nilis returned to the Congo as 1st class captain commander of the Force Publique. He was attached to the Ubangi-Mbomou expedition under Le Marinel. He reached Yakoma on 5 November 1893. In mid-December he was assigned to lead a reconnaissance expedition to Dār Fertit, with lieutenants Charles de la Kethulle, Gérard and Gonze as his deputies. The expedition left Bangassou for Rafaï on 28 December 1893, with the goal of reaching Hofrah-el-Nahas on the Bahr-el-Fertit. It reached Katuaka (8°48′N 24°26′E), home of chief Acmed Curcia. The post later known as Fort de l'Adda was founded there, with Gérard as commander assisted by Henrion. The column was stopped by floods and did not go further. It returned via Kuria, which it reached on 1 April 1894, and on 24 April 1894 arrived at Dabago, where Hanolet was waiting. In May Nilis and de la Kethulle returned to Rafaï.

Hanolet's expedition had left for the north in February 1894. Hanolet travelled up the valley of the Bali (Mbali) river and the upper Kotto River, following the road of the Arab caravans. His expedition reached Dabago at 6°58′0″N 23°10′0″E on the Ndji River. Hanolet joined the advance party at Mbele on 16 June 1894. The intent had been to continue to Dar al-Kuti, and try to annex it to the Congo Free State, but the expedition was exhausted. The Belgians returned to Dabago on 1 November 1894, and were accompanied by a band of traders from Tripoli who were going to Bangassou.

The Belgian expeditions caused a dispute with the French that led to an agreement that the Bomu would be the northern border of the Congo Free State in this region. On 18 August 1894 France and Belgium signed a convention that established the Mbomou as the border between their colonies, so the country explored by Hanolet was now part of the French territory. In November 1894 the Belgians on the Upper Ubangi heard of the 14 August 1894.

== Later career (1895–1914) ==
Le Marinel went back to Europe on leave in 1895, and was assigned to the Ministry of Colonies in Brussels. During World War I (1914–1918) he rejoined the army. He became a captain-commandant of the engineers, and inspector of state in the Congo Free State and a director in the Belgian colonial ministry. Le Marinel died in Edinburgh, Scotland on 20 November 1914, aged 54.

== Sources ==
- Boulvert, Yves (2019), Explorations en Afrique Centrale 1790-1930 Apports des explorateurs à la connaissance du milieu (PDF)
- Bradshaw, Richard; Fandos-Rius, Juan (27 May 2016), Historical Dictionary of the Central African Republic, Rowman & Littlefield Publishers, ISBN 978-0-8108-7992-8
- Coosemans, M. (20 May 1946), "MILZ (Jules-Alexandre)", Biographie Belge d'Outre-Mer (in French), vol. I, Académie Royale des Sciences d'Outre-Mer, pp. 697–701
- De Coster, Pieter (1997), "Biografie van Paul Le Marinel", De eerste Europese ontdekkingsreizen in Katanga 1797-1897 (in Dutch)
- Engels, A. (1948), "MARINEL (LE) (Georges-Edouard)", Biographie Coloniale Belge (in French), vol. 1, Inst. roy. colon. belge, pp. 659–664
- Engels, A. (1951), "HANOLET (Léon-Charles-Êdouard)", Biographie Coloniale Belge (in French), vol. II, Inst. roy. colon. belge, pp. col. 448–452
- Engels, A.; Coosemans, M. (1947), "NILIS (Théodore-Victor-Edouard-Adolphe-Arthur)", Biographie Coloniale Belge (in French), vol. I, Inst. roy. colon. belge, pp. col.732–738
- Ergo, André-Bernard (2013), "Les postes fortifiés de la frontière Nord de l'État Indépendant du Congo" (PDF), Histoire du Congo, archived from the original (PDF) on 2022-05-25
- Fandos-Rius, Juan; Serre, Jacques (5 August 2009), Subprefectures of the Central African Republic, archived from the original on 6 February 2012
- "Hanolet, Léon (Charles Édouard)", Africamuseum.be, Royal Museum for Central Africa
- Janssens, Édouard; Cateaux, Albert (1908), Les Belges au Congo: notices biographiques, Antwerp: J. van Hille-De Backer, pp. 167–182
- Lotar, R. P. L. (1937), La Grande Chronique de l'Ubangi (PDF), Institut Royal Colonial Beige
- Morren, Tom (2014), Inventaire des archives d'Alphonse Vangele 1848 - 1939 (PDF) (in Dutch), Tervuren: Koninklijk Museum voor Midden-Afrika
