= Mokoangai =

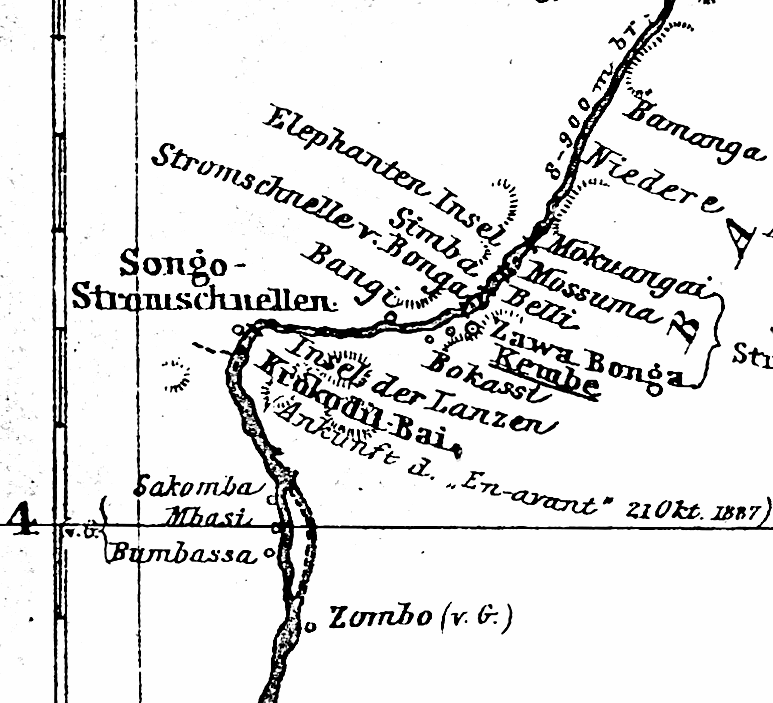
- Detail of 1888 map of the Ubangi-Uele. Mokuangai to the northeast

- Location within Democratic Republic of the Congo
- Coordinates: 4.763559°N 19.007431°E
- Country: Democratic Republic of the Congo
- Province: Nord-Ubangi

Mokoangai or Mokuangai was a colonial station in the Congo Free State on the Ubangi River, beside the Mokoangai rapids. Above the station the Ubangi could easily be navigated up to Yakoma, where the Mbomou River and Uele River combine to form the Ubangi.

== Location ==
The middle part of the Ubangi, from Yakoma down to Mokoangai, is called the Dua. It appears to be the bed of an ancient, long and narrow lake. The waters draining the lake carved out the Zongo Gut, which cuts through a chain of hills that extends from east to west. Ascending the Ubangi from Zongo the rapids in the colonial era were named Zongo, Bonga, Belly, En Avant, Elephant and Mokuangi, and covered a distance of 24 miles (39 km). An 1888 map based on Alphonse van Gèle's observations shows the Songo rapids, then further east four rapids, ascending from southwest to northeast: Zawa Bonga, Belli, Mossuma and Mokuangai. Elephanten Insel was between Mossuma and Mokuangai.

The banks of the river in this section when Van Gele visited in 1887 were bordered by gentle slopes with alternating woods, plains, maize fields and banana plantations. The people around Mokuangi were Bakombe. Above Mokuangi the river came down from the northeast for about 50 kilometres (31 mi), and was about 4 metres (13 ft) deep and 800 to 900m wide (2625ft to 2953ft).

== Early European presence ==
An expedition under Van Gèle left Equateur Station on 26 October 1887 in the steamer En Avant towing a large canoe that could hold 100 people. It reached Zongo on 21 November 1887, and took three weeks to ascend the rapids, passing Mokuangai on 11 December 1887. In 1889 Van Gèle and Georges Le Marinel studied the north shore of the Ubangi between Banzyville and Mokoangai and discovered the mouths of the Kuanga and Benghi rivers.

Louis Royaux (born 1866) joined the Congo Free State in 1892 and became the deputy of Florent-François-Marie Heymans in Zongo. He was then made station head in Banzyville and then Mokoangay. He "pacified" the regions for which he was responsible, before returning to Belgium in August 1895. Mokoangai was one or two hours upstream from the Elephant rapids. In 1905 it had a large plantation and farm, and well built houses that lodged one or two resident Europeans.

== Sources ==
- Capenny, S.H.F. (1899), "The Khedivic Possessions in the Basin of the Upport Ubangi", Scottish Geographical Magazine, 15 (3): 138–142, doi:10.1080/00369229908733036
- Dorman, Dorman (1905), "V. The Ubangi River. - Irebu to Banzyville", A Journal of a Tour in the Congo Free State
- Janssens, Édouard; Cateaux, Albert (1908), Les Belges au Congo: notices biographiques, Antwerp: J. van Hille-De Backer, pp. 167–182
- Mouvement Géographique (1888), "Geographical Notes: Africa: Exploration of the Mobangi-Welle", The Scottish Geographical Magazine, Royal Scottish Geographical Society
- "Royaux, Louis", Africamuseum.be
- Schmidt, Carl; Hassenstein, B. (1888), "Der Ubangi-Uelle", Petersmanns Geographische Milleilungen (in German)
