= Abiras =

1903–1906 French colonial capital of Ubangi-Shari

Coordinates: 4.135°N 22.440°E

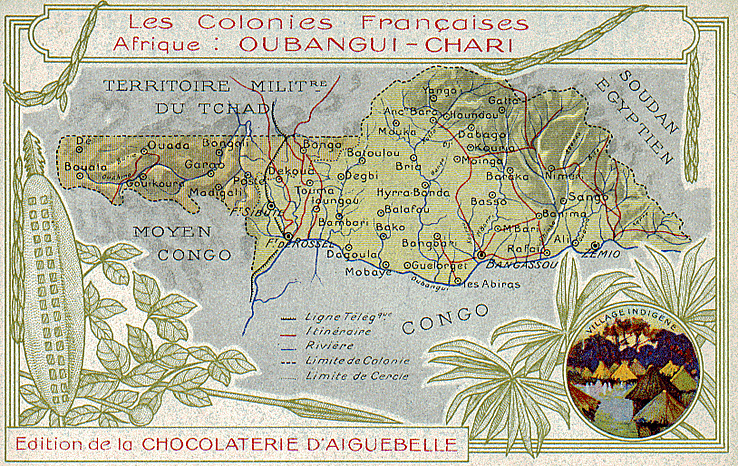
A map of Ubangi-Shari c. 1910 showing the location of les Abiras in the southeastern corner of the colony

Abiras (French: les Abiras) is a former settlement that was located on the northern bank of the Ubangi River at its source, the confluence of the Mbomou and Welle rivers. It was located opposite from the Congolese city of Yakoma in the area of the present-day Central African Republic.

It was not until 1882 or ’83 that the German explorer Wilhelm Junker established that the Welle flowed into the Mbomou; the Belgian agent Alphonse Vangele established the Yakoma post in 1890. The Frenchman Gaston Gaillard then received a grant from the Yakoma leader Inkesse on the north bank and established Abiras on September 7, 1891. During the initial French settlement of central Africa, Abiras served as the capital of the French Congo's territory of Upper Ubangi (Haut-Oubangui) and then as the first capital of the colony of Ubangi-Shari (Oubangui-Chari). It was replaced in 1906 first by Fort de Possel and then by Bangi, the present-day Bangui.

Coordinates are based on aerial photographs; a statement that in 1894, "a large French expedition had massed at Abiras (junction of the Wellé and Mbomu Rivers)"; and a statement "Elsewhere we learn that Abiras, at the mouth of the Mbomu...". There are a number of villages in the area in the present day, such as André.
