= Ngiri =

Ngiri may refer to

- Ngiri, Kenya, a settlement in Kenya's Nyanza Province
- Ngiri Reserve, a protected area of the Democratic Republic of the Congo
- Ngiri River, a tributary of the Ubangi River in the Democratic Republic of the Congo
- Ngiri-Ngiri, a municipality (commune) in the Funa district of Kinshasa
- Ngondi–Ngiri languages, a clade of Bantu languages
