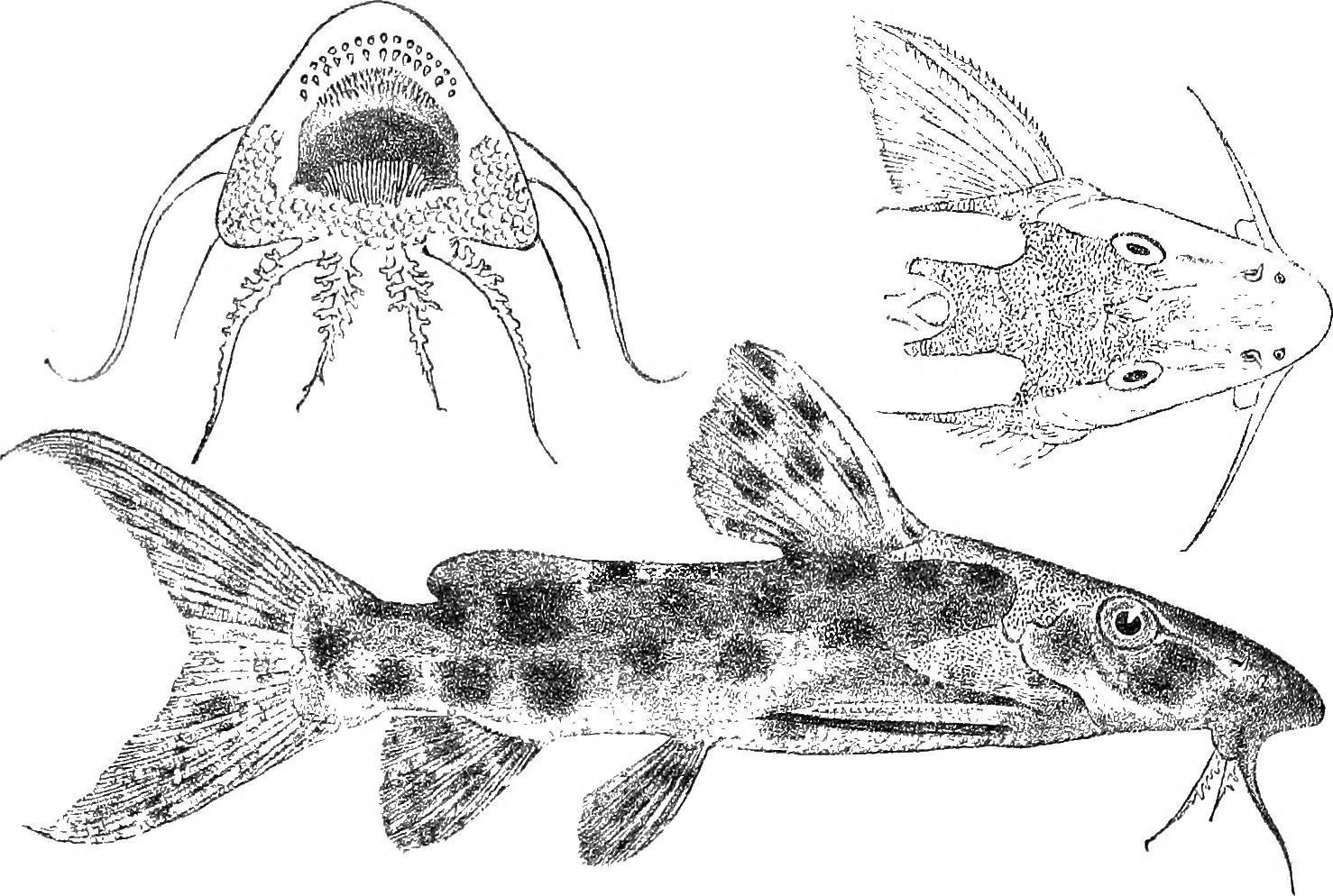

Conservation status
- Least Concern (IUCN 3.1)

Scientific classification
- Kingdom: Animalia
- Phylum: Chordata
- Class: Actinopterygii
- Order: Siluriformes
- Family: Mochokidae
- Genus: Synodontis
- Species: S. longirostris

Binomial name
- Synodontis longirostris Boulenger, 1902

= Synodontis longirostris =

Species of fish

Synodontis longirostris, known as the eyespot synodontis, is a species of upside-down catfish that is native to the Democratic Republic of the Congo where it occurs in the Congo Basin. It was first described by British-Belgian zoologist George Albert Boulenger in 1902, from specimens obtained in the Ubangi River at Banzyville. The species name longirostris comes from the Latin word longus, meaning "long", and the Latin word rostrum, meaning snout, referring to the long snout on this species.

== Description ==
Like all members of the genus Synodontis, S. longirostris has a strong, bony head capsule that extends back as far as the first spine of the dorsal fin. The head contains a distinct narrow, bony, external protrusion called a humeral process. The shape and size of the humeral process helps to identify the species. In S. longirostris, the humeral process is rough, much longer than it is broad, and pointed at the end.

The fish has three pairs of barbels. The maxillary barbels are on located on the upper jaw, and two pairs of mandibular barbels are on the lower jaw. The maxillary barbel is straight without any branches, without a membrane at the base. It extends about 1/2 as long as the head. The outer pair of mandibular barbels is a little under twice the length of the inner pair. They have short branches.

The front edges of the dorsal fins and the pectoral fins of Syntontis species are hardened into stiff spines. In S. longirostris, the spine of the dorsal fin is about 2/3 the length of the head, slight curved, smooth in the front and serrated on the back. The remaining portion of the dorsal fin is made up of seven branching rays. The spine of the pectoral fin is slightly longer than the dorsal spine and serrated on both sides. The adipose fin is 3 times as long as it is deep. The anal fin contains four unbranched and six branched rays, and is obtusely pointed in the front. The tail, or caudal fin, is deeply notched.

All members of Syndontis have a structure called a premaxillary toothpad, which is located on the very front of the upper jaw of the mouth. This structure contains several rows of short, chisel-shaped teeth. In S. longirostris, the toothpad forms a short, broad band. On the lower jaw, or mandible, the teeth of Syndontis are attached to flexible, stalk-like structures and described as "s-shaped" or "hooked". The number of teeth on the mandible is used to differentiate between species; in S. longirostris, there are about 24 teeth on the mandible.

The base body color is olive-brown, with large round black spots in three series on the body.

The maximum total length of the species is 66 centimetres (26 in). Generally, females in the genus Synodontis tend to be slightly larger than males of the same age.

== Habitat and behavior ==
In the wild, the species is known throughout the Congo River basin, with the exception of the southern tributaries. The species is harvested for the aquarium trade. The reproductive habits of most of the species of Synodontis are not known, beyond some instances of obtaining egg counts from gravid females. Spawning likely occurs during the flooding season between July and October, and pairs swim in unison during spawning. The growth rate is rapid in the first year, then slows down as the fish age.
