= Kungu =

- Location in Democratic Republic of the Congo
- Coordinates: 2°47′N 19°11′E
- Country: Democratic Republic of the Congo
- Province: Sud-Ubangi

Kungu is a town and capital of one of the four territories of Sud-Ubangi Province, Democratic Republic of the Congo. The Ubangi River forms the western boundary of Kungu Territory, separating it from the Republic of the Congo. The Ngiri River, which flows southward through the Ngiri Reserve, originates near the town of Kungu.
