= Yakoma =

Yakoma may refer to:

- Yakoma people, an ethnic group mainly living in the Central African Republic
- Yakoma language, spoken by the Yakoma people and others
- Yakoma, Democratic Republic of the Congo, a town in the Democratic Republic of the Congo
- Yakoma Territory, a territory of the Democratic Republic of the Congo
