= Ibenga River =

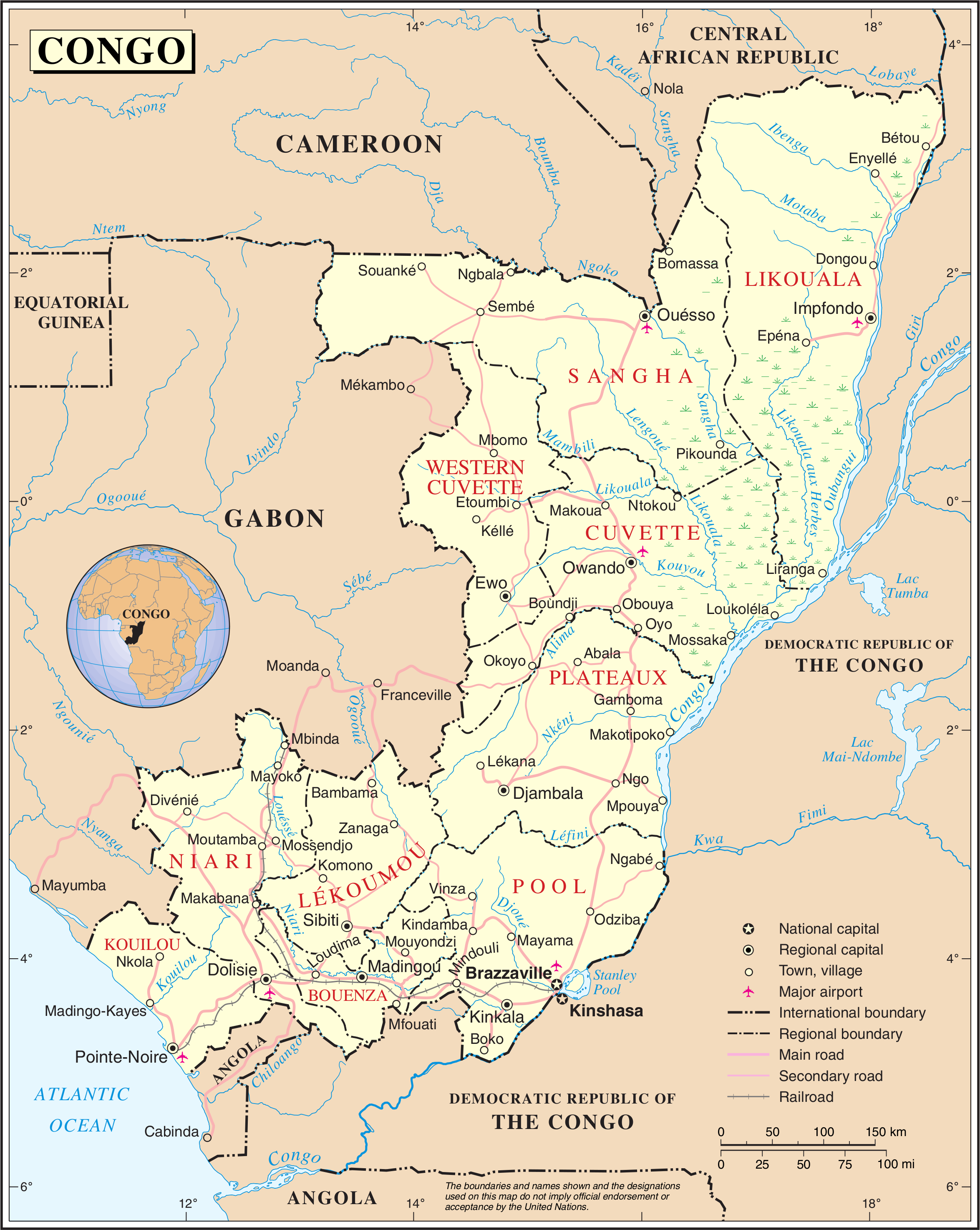
- Rivers of the Republic of the Congo. Ibenga in the extreme north.

- Location within Republic of the Congo

Location
- Country: Republic of the Congo
- District: Dongou

Physical characteristics
- Mouth: Ubangi River
  - coordinates: 2.282423°N 18.099886°E

The Ibenga River (French: Rivière Ibenga or Libenga River) is a river of the Republic of the Congo, a right tributary of the Ubangi River.

== Location ==
The river rises to the northwest of Enyelle. It flows past that town, then meanders in a generally SSE direction to the Ubangi. The river is 325 kilometres (202 mi) long. It is important as a local transportation route. The main economic activities along the river are fishing and production of palm wine.

== History ==
The first European to explore the river was Alphonse van Gèle, in November–December 1886.

== Ramsar site ==
The Libenga Ramsar site extends along the length of the Libenga River and includes the marshes on both sides of the river, small streams, floodplains, and swamp forests. As of 2000 there was no official management plan, but some protection was provided by restrictive hunting seasons and exploitation in some zones being limited to clan residents. The river serves as a refuge for hippopotamus to escape threats they face on the Ubangi. There are many endemic and migratory fish species. The government began a program to limit invasive aquatic species in 1998. Migratory marabou stork and pelicans use the prairies around the river, as do migratory buffaloes.

== Sources ==
- Janssens, Édouard; Cateaux, Albert (1908), Les Belges au Congo: notices biographiques, Antwerp: J. van Hille-De Backer, pp. 167–182
- Libenga, Ramsar Sites Information Service
- "Way: Ibenga (246788958)", OpenStreetMap
