= Bomongo =

- Commune
- Location within Democratic Republic of the Congo
- Coordinates: 1.36667°N 18.35°E
- Country: DR Congo
- Province: Équateur
- Territory: Bomongo

Bomongo is a town in the Équateur Province of the Democratic Republic of the Congo, the headquarters of Bomongo Territory. It lies on the west bank of the Ngiri River. Bomongo is the only town in the Ngiri Reserve, a sparsely populated region of swamp forest between the Ubangi and Congo rivers.
