= Adrienne Yabouza =

Central African novelist (born 1965)

Adrienne Yabouza (born 1965) is a writer from the Central African Republic. She is of Yakoma heritage. She has written several novels and a book for children, a number of which were penned in collaboration with French writer Yves Pinguilly.

== Life ==
Yabouza began writing when she was ten years old. As a young woman she fled the civil war in the Central African Republic and traveled to the Republic of the Congo; from there she fled to France, where she demanded political asylum. She never attended any institution of higher education. Although she later returned to her home country, she has continued to speak out against the political violence with which it has been plagued, including the 2013 coup d'état.

Yabouza was a hairdresser for many years in Bangui, and has held numerous other jobs throughout her career. She lives in the Lakouanga neighborhood of Bangui. She writes in French, and also speaks Sango and Lingala in addition to her native Yakoma. Her work deals with the difficulties facing women in the Central African Republic, and many of the stories she tells are derived from family stories and from things she has heard in her neighborhood and working in the salon, locations in which women feel free to speak among themselves. She has said that she invents truths, that the lives of her heroines are not particularly based on her own. Among her influences she cites both Mariama Bâ and Ousmane Sembène. The first three of her novels were intended to be viewed as a trilogy. Widowed, she has five children and is a grandmother; she raised her children on her own, as a single mother.

== Works ==
- La défaite des mères, novel (2008) (with Yves Pinguilly)
- Bangui… allowi, novel (2009) (with Yves Pinguilly)
- Le bleu du ciel biani biani, novel (2010) (with Yves Pinguilly)
- Coup d'état, novella, published under the pseudonym Auguste Komelo Nikodro (2010)
- La maltraite des veuves, novel (2013)
- Comme des oiseaux, book for children (2015)
- Co-épouses et co-veuves, novel (2015). Co-wives, Co-widows, trans. Rachael McGill (Dedalus Books, 2022).
