= Ngiri Triangle Nature Reserve =

Protected area in the Republic of Congo

Ngiri Reserve
- IUCN category VI (protected area with sustainable use of natural resources)
- Location within Democratic Republic of the Congo
- Nearest city: Mbandaka
- Coordinates: 0°20′24″S 18°07′16″E
- Area: 1,000 square kilometres (390 sq mi)
- Established: 2011

The Ngiri Reserve is a protected area of the Democratic Republic of the Congo (DRC). It is located in western Équateur province, in the Bomongo, Bikoro and Makanza territories, and covers a total area of 1,000 square kilometres (390 sq mi). It extends northward from the confluence of the Congo River and the Ubangi River. According to the World Wide Fund for Nature (WWF) the reserve will conserve biodiversity and the ecosystem in the Ngiri triangle.

== History ==
It was first proposed to make the Ngiri triangle, the area between the Ubangi, Congo and Ngiri rivers, into a reserve in 1975, but the project could not be completed. The project was revived by the WWF in the context of Lake Tele - Lake Tumba landscape project, of which the Tumba-Ngiri-Maindombe wetland is the DRC portion. It was proposed that the new reserve should be IUCN category VI.

In August 2010, the Cooperation Agreement between the governments of the Republic of the Congo and the DRC on the Lake Tele - Lake Tumba landscape provided for creation of the Ngiri reserve as well the Mabali scientific reserve in addition to the Tumba-Lediima Nature Reserve in the DRC and the Lake Télé Community Reserve in the Republic of the Congo. The Ngiri reserve was created by a decree of the Ministry of Environment in March 2011, with the participation of WWF.

== Environment ==
The reserve is mostly covered by swamp forest, and contains many streams and rivers. The Ngiri River flows from north to south through the center of the reserve before joining the Ubangi. A wide zone bordering the Ngiri consists of alternating marshy grassland-savanna, swamp forests and seasonally flooded forests. The savanna is burned in the dry season. At other times it is flooded. Common tree species are Entandrophragma palustre, Coelocaryon botryoides, Uapaca heudelotii, Guibourtia demeusei and Oubanguia africana. Rainfall is relatively constant throughout the year, averaging 1,770 millimetres (70 in), but is slightly heavier from August to October and lighter in April and May. The Ubangi and Ngiri water levels are highest from September to November, while the Congo has highest water levels from October to December.

The reserve is a breeding ground for large numbers of water birds, particularly purple herons, reed cormorants and African darters. During the low-water periods rosy bee-eaters and African river martins breed in the reserve. It is the only location in the DRC where Congo sunbirds have been found. Vulnerable African bush elephants are present, and Allen's swamp monkeys are thought to be present.

The region has a very sparse human population engaged mainly in fishing and hunting. Most settlements are near to Bomongo, the only town in the reserve. The capital of Équateur province, Mbandaka, lies to the south of the reserve where the Tshuapa River enters the Congo from the east.
