= Lobaye River =

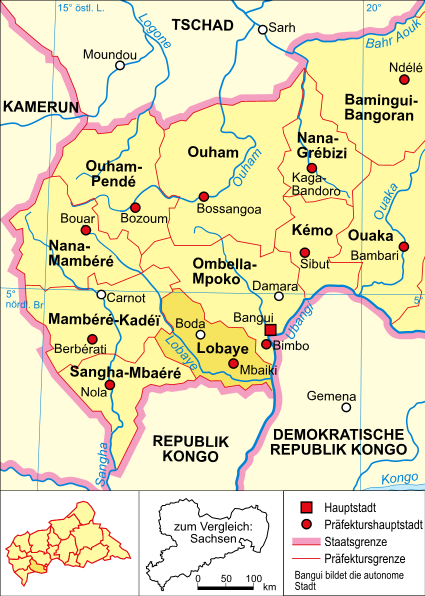
- Western CAR showing Lobaye prefecture and river

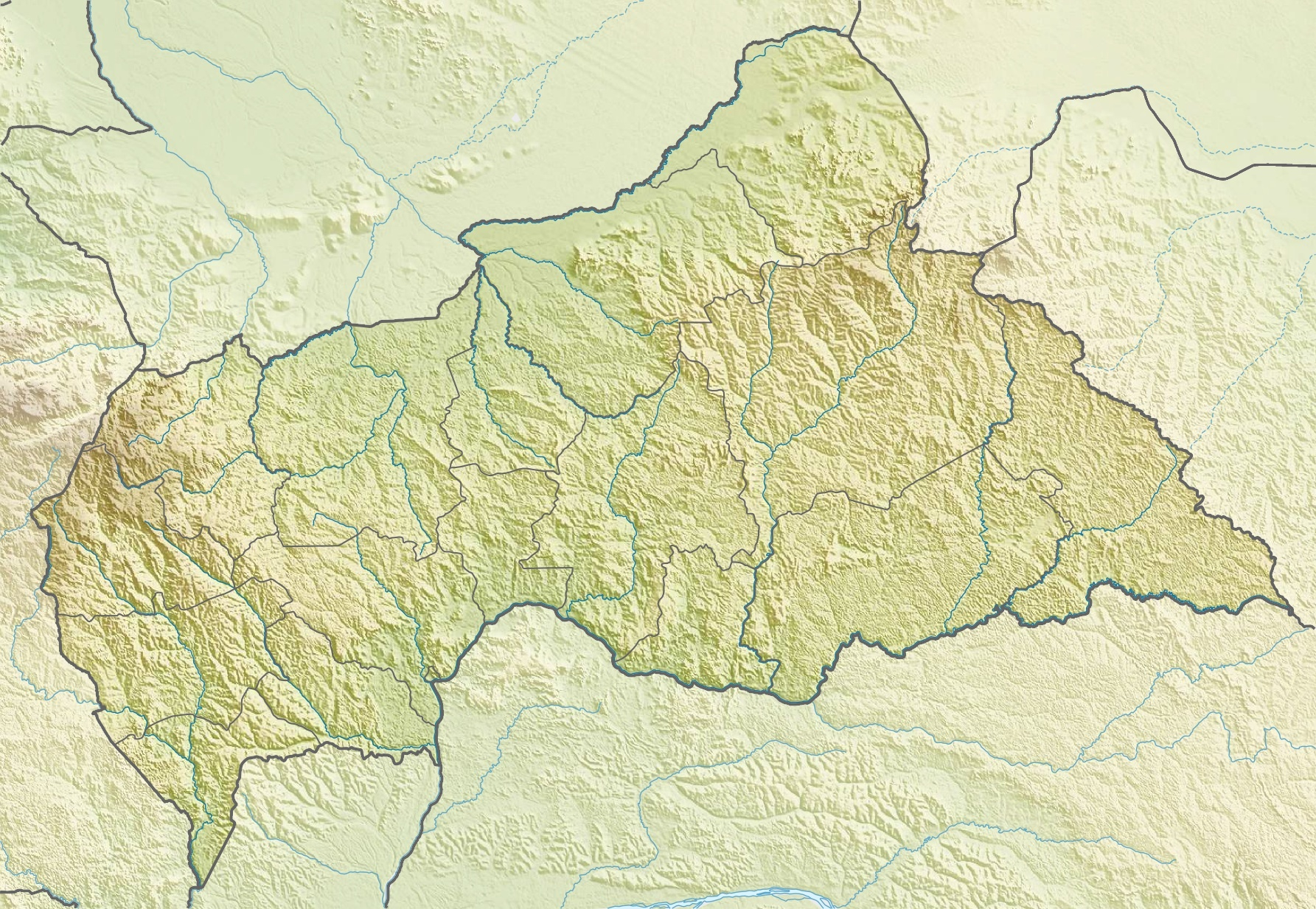
- Location within Central African Republic

Location
- Country: Central African Republic

Physical characteristics
- Mouth: Ubangi River
  - coordinates: 3.675661°N 18.585761°E
- Length: 538 kilometres (334 mi)

The Lobaye River (or Lobay, French: Rivière Lobaye) is a river of the Central African Republic, a right tributary of the Ubangi River.

== Course ==
The Lobaye River forms in the west of the country, in the prefecture of Nana-Mambéré and flows in a generally southeast direction through Mambéré-Kadéï and Lobaye to its junction with the Ubangi. The Lobaye drains part of the Carnot sandstone plateau. There is potential for hydroelectric development, particularly in the section between the mouth of the Mbaéré and the Loko-Safa falls.

The Lobaye is 538 kilometres (334 mi) long, with an average slope of 1.25 metres per kilometre (6.6 ft/mi). It rises near Bouar at an elevation of about 1,040 metres (3,410 ft), and its upper course is called the Bali River as far as Baoro. The upper part is at first torrential, but after some rapids at 78 kilometres (48 mi) from its source it flows into a wide U-shaped valley. The lower part is navigable for almost 118 kilometres (73 mi), flowing through equatorial forest.

== History ==
One of the first Europeans to explore the river was the Belgian Alphonse van Gèle, in November–December 1886. On 25 July 1901 a mission led by the colonial administrator M. Dessirier de Paulwel, with 30 militia and 65 porters, left Bangui and crossed the Bonjo territory to reach Loko on the Lobay River on 1 September 1901. The mission then went north to the Carnot post on the Sangha River, which was reached on 20 October 1901. Dessirier de Paulwel concluded that the M'Bali River was not, as had been thought, the upper part of the Likouala-aux-Herbes River, a tributary of the lower Sangha, but rather was part of the Lobay River. On Hansen's map the river was shown as flowing 80 kilometres (50 mi) to the east of the Sangha, but in fact it was only 40 kilometres (25 mi) away at the Carnot post.

The Compagnie des Caoutchoucs et Produits de la Lobay (Lobay Rubber and Products Company) was established in 1899. The company was based in Paris and had 2 million francs capital. Directors were Albert Motte, Léon Motte-Bossut, Ignace Cauvez and Ernest Grisar. The concession covered 32,400 square kilometres (12,500 sq mi) of the Lobay basin. Activities included all agricultural, forestry, mining, industrial, commercial, etc. operations aimed at exploiting this concession or facilitating its exploitation. In 1910 the company was taken over by Ékela-Kadei-Sangha, and became part of the Compagnie forestière Sangha-Oubangui.

== Conservation ==
The Basse-Lobaye Biosphere Reserve protects part of the forest along the lower part of the river. It has an area of 18,200 hectares (45,000 acres). There is no buffer zone. Vegetation is dense semi-deciduous tropical humid forest, a young forest with a closed understory, mostly gallery forest. There are scattered Pygmy camps. The economy is based on agriculture, hunting, fishing and gathering of non-woody forest products.

== Sources ==
- "Afrique Congo francais", Bulletin (in French), Société de géographie de Lille, 1902
- Basse-Lobaye Biosphere Reserve, Central African Republic, UNESCO, 17 December 2019
- Callède, J.; Boulvert, Y.; Thiébaux, J-P. (2009), Le Bassin De L'oubangui (PDF), Marseille, ISBN 978-2-7099-1680-6
- Janssens, Édouard; Cateaux, Albert (1908), Les Belges au Congo: notices biographiques, Antwerp: J. van Hille-De Backer, pp. 167–182
- Leger, Alain Y., "Compagnie des Caoutchoucs et Produits de la Lobay (1899–1910)" (PDF), entreprises-coloniales.fr
- "Relation: Lobaye (1188746)", OpenStreetMap
