= Makanza Territory =

Coordinates: 1°33′N 19°00′E

Makanza
- Territory
- Interactive map of Makanza
- Country: DR Congo
- Province: Équateur
- Seat: Makanza

Area
  - Total: 7,570 km^{2} (2,920 sq mi)

Population
  - Total: 250,549
  - Density: 33.1/km^{2} (85.7/sq mi)
- Time zone: UTC+1 (West Africa Time)

Makanza or Mankanza Territory is an administrative area in Équateur Province in the Democratic Republic of the Congo. It lies along the main channel of the Congo River. Headquarters for the territory is the town of Makanza. The territory was created by presidential order on 6 October 1976.

In the early 21st century, bandits operated in the area.

== Climate ==
The average temperature is between 23° and 25°C. The average annual rainfall is between 1700 mm and 1900 mm.

== Administrative divisions ==
In addition to the town of Makanza, officially a commune, the territory is divided into three sectors:

Bangala, with four groupings (groupements) of 34 villages;
Mweko, with two groupings (groupements) of 21 villages;
Ndobo, with four groupings (groupements) of 17 villages.

== Towns ==
The main towns are:

- Bolombo
- Mabanga
- Makanza, HQ
- Malele
- Malundja
- Mobeka
- Lusenge
