= Louis Haneuse =

Belgian soldier and colonial administrator

Louis-AIbert-Marie-Joseph Haneuse
- Born: 19 April 1853; Liège, Belgium
- Died: 3 December 1938 (aged 85); Liège, Belgium
- Occupations: Soldier, colonial administrator

Louis-AIbert-Marie-Joseph Haneuse (19 April 1853 – 3 December 1938) was a Belgian soldier and colonial administrator.

== Early years ==
'Louis-AIbert-Marie-Joseph Haneuse was born in Liège, Belgium, on 19 April 1853. He joined the army, and became a second lieutenant in the 10th line regiment. In 1882 he was seconded to serve in the Congo, at that time administered by the International Association of the Congo.

== First Congo assignment ==
Haneuse embarked for the Congo on 15 September 1882. On his arrival he was assigned to improve the posts of Isangila, Manyanga and Lutete along the caravan route to the upper Congo River. He served there for twenty-eight months, often seeing action against the local people. He became sick with hematuria and was forced to return to Belgium.

== Second Congo assignment ==
After recovering, Haneuse returned to the Congo as Resident at Stanley Falls (Kisangani). The Congo Free State had given command of this station to Tippu Tip, with the title of Vali, after Lieutenant Dubois had died and Captain Walter Deane had retreated in 1886. Haneuse arrived at Stanley Falls in August 1888, and found Omer Bodson and Edward Hinck in charge of rebuilding the Belgian station about 1 kilometre (0.62 mi) downstream from the former station, which was completed in 15 November 1888. The work was done by the Arabs who had destroyed the original building. Haneuse handled his difficult task effectively. He personally ordered the execution of the Arab who had assassinated the English major Edmund Musgrave Barttelot, whom Henry Morton Stanley had left in Yambuya during the Emin Pasha Relief Expedition. He accompanied Alexandre Delcommune on his 17-day ascent by steamer of the Lomami River to Bena-Kamba. In September 1889 he again came down with hematuria and had to hand over his position to Bodson and return to Europe.

== Later career ==
Because of Haneuse's knowledge of the Swahili language and the Arabized people, King Leopold II of Belgium sent him to Zanzibar in 1890–1891 to recruit askaris to help fight the Arabs in the Congo. In 1892–1893 he undertook a similar mission in Abyssinia and on the Somali coast. He retired from the Belgian army in 1907 with the rank of colonel. At the start of World War I in 1914 he assisted in the defense of Namur in Louis-Napoléon Chaltin's volunteer corps of former colonial troops. Later he founded the African Circle of Brussels and chaired the Liège section of the Association of Colonial Veterans. He died in Liège on 3 December 1938.

== Sources ==
- Firchow, Peter Edgerly (2021-03-17), Envisioning Africa: Racism and Imperialism in Conrad's Heart of Darkness, University Press of Kentucky, ISBN 978-0-8131-8145-5
- Menzel, Edm. (17 January 1952), "HANEUSE (Louis-AIbert-Marie-Joseph)", Biographie Coloniale Belge, vol. IV, Inst. roy. colon. belge, pp. col.376–377
