= Makanza =

- Commune
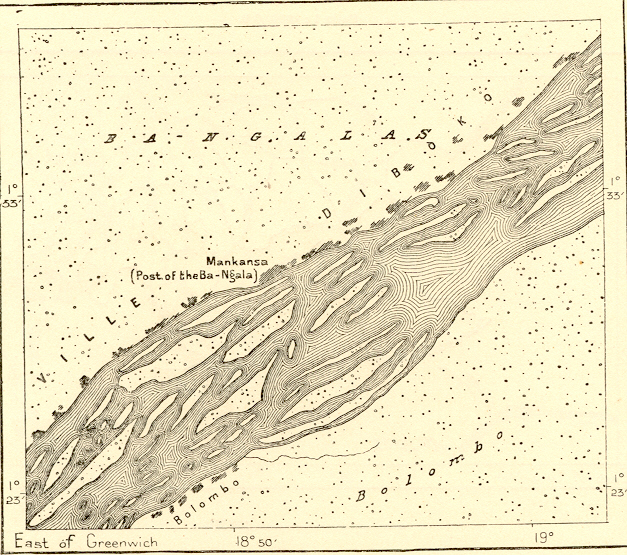
- Map of Makanza, around 1890

- Location within Democratic Republic of the Congo
- Coordinates: 1.677922°N 19.166336°E
- Country: DR Congo
- Province: Équateur
- Territory: Makanza
- Time zone: UTC+1 (West Africa Time)

Makanza or Mankanza is a town in the Équateur province of the Democratic Republic of the Congo, headquarters of Makanza territory.

== History ==
Makanza was formerly known as Bangala Station and then as Nouvelle-Anvers / Nieuw-Antwerpen (New Antwerp). It is a port on the River Congo. Located midway between Kinshasa and Kisangani, the location housed a trading post from the 1890s. The town was one of the main stages of the Emin Pasha Relief Expedition. The Bangala people of the area were among the first people to come in contact with the colonialists. Their language, Lingala, eventually merged with the "Lobangi" lingua franca of the river.

From 1884 onwards, the city played an important role in the development of the Force Publique (the colonial army). This led to Lingala becoming the working language of the army.

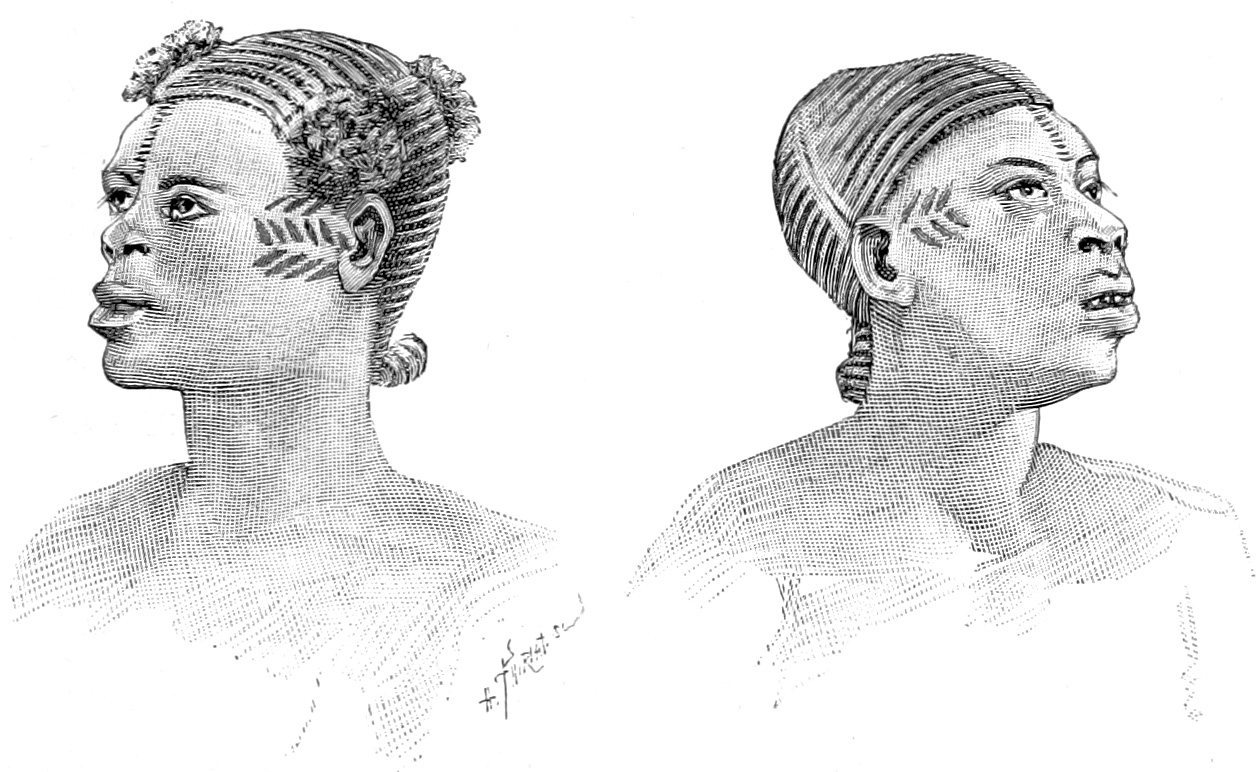
Bangala tattoos, 1889

== Demographics ==
Year	Population
1994	37,048
2004	41,447
