= Yakoma people =

Ethnic group in Central African Republic and the Democratic Republic of the Congo

Yakoma
Total population
- 170,000

Regions with significant populations
- Central African Republic; Democratic Republic of the Congo

Languages
- Yakoma, French

Religion
- Catholicism

Related ethnic groups
- Ngbandi

The Yakoma are an ethnic group who primarily reside in the Central African Republic. As of June 2008, the Yakoma make up 4% of the country's population. Additionally, 10,000 live in the Democratic Republic of the Congo.

The city of Yakoma takes its name from the people Yakoma, and the Yakoma's lands were utilized by the French for their post at les Abiras, which was the first capital of Ubangi-Shari, who were the predecessors to the modern-day Central African Republic. The Yakoma speak a dialect (also known as Yakoma), which is similar to Sango.

André-Dieudonné Kolingba, president of the CAR from 1979 to 1993, was a member of this group, as is the writer Adrienne Yabouza.
