= Ngiri River =

River in Democratic Republic of the Congo

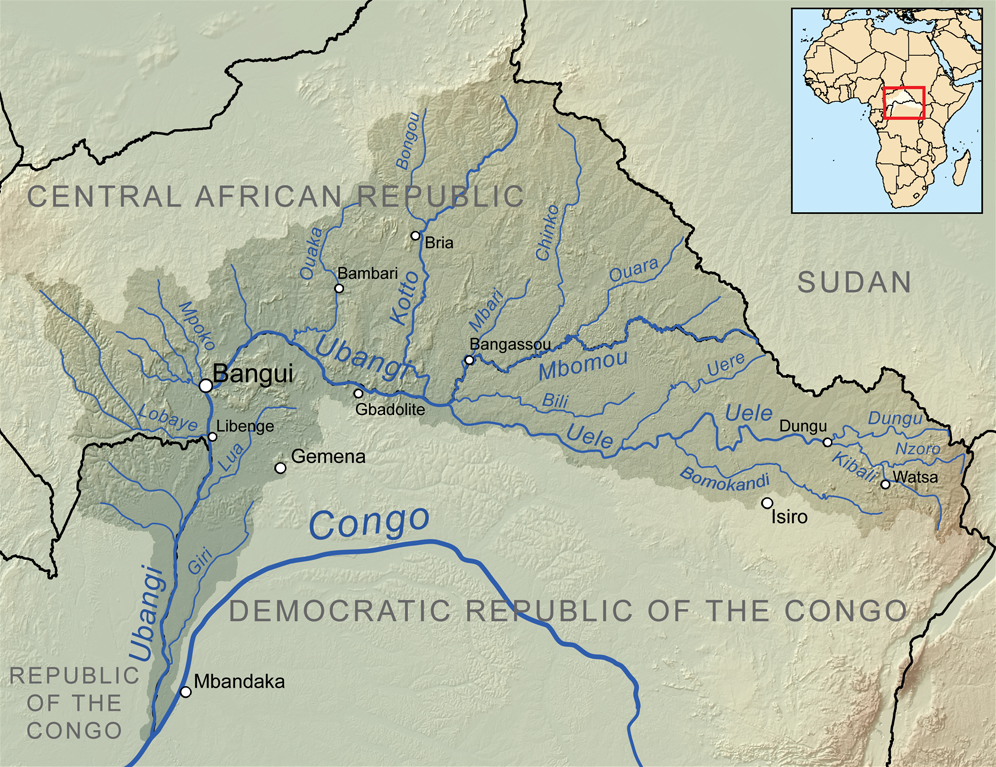

Location
- Country: Democratic Republic of the Congo

Physical characteristics
- Mouth
  - coordinates: 0.333204°N 17.954178°E

Basin features
- River system: Ubangi River

The Ngiri River (or Giri River) is a tributary of the Ubangi River that flows southward through the Sud-Ubangi District of Équateur province, Democratic Republic of the Congo.

The Ngiri originates near the town of Kungu in Kungu Territory. It forms the boundary between this territory and the Budjala Territory to the east, and then the boundary with the Bomongo Territory to the south. It then flows south through Bomongo Territory past the town of Bomongo on its right bank, entering the Ubangi further south.

The Ngiri River flows from north to south through the center of the Ngiri Reserve before joining the Ubangi. A wide zone bordering the Ngiri consists of alternating marshy grassland-savanna, swamp forests and seasonally flooded forests. The savanna is burned in the dry season. At other times it is flooded. The Ngiri flows slowly, with many meanders, and sometimes divides into more than one channel. The water is very dark. During high water periods it is possible to paddle by canoe from the Ubangi through small channels of the Ngiri to the Congo river.

== Sources ==
- Captain Vangele (1889). "Explorations of the Welle-Mobangi River". Proceedings. Royal Geographical Society, London, Volume 11.
