= Mobayi-Mbongo =

- Commune
- Location within Democratic Republic of the Congo
- Coordinates: 4.300°N 21.180°E
- Country: DR Congo
- Province: Nord-Ubangi
- Territory: Mobayi-Mbongo

Population (2012)
  - Total: 5,640
- Time zone: UTC+1 (WAT)
- National language: Lingala

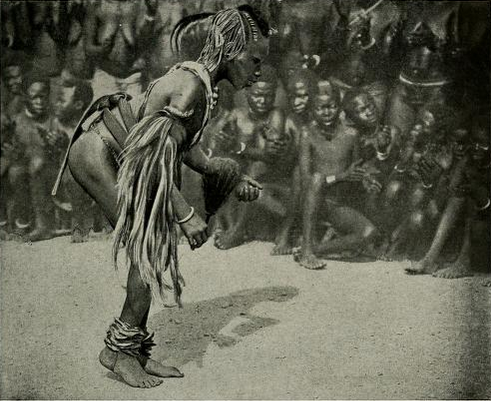
The best dancer on the Ubangi at Banzyville, 1906

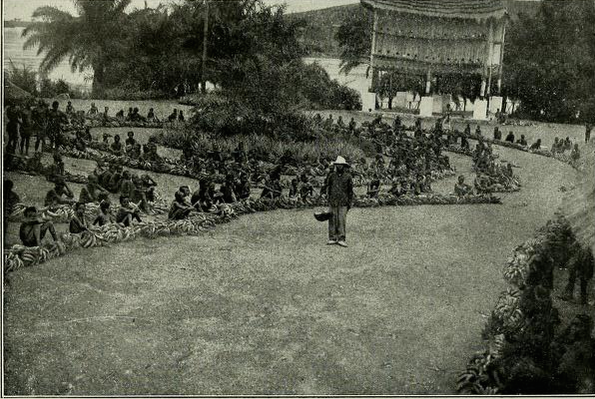
Bananas being brought by children into Banzyville, 1906

Mobayi-Mbongo, formerly known as Banzyville or Banzystad, is a town in Nord-Ubangi Province, in the northwestern part of the Democratic Republic of the Congo, on the Ubangi River. It lies opposite the Central African town of Mobaye. It is the administrative center of the territory of the same name. As of 2012 the estimated population was 5,640.

A small hydroelectric power station was opened in 1989, with some of the power being exported to the CAR.
