= Mbomou River =

River in Africa

Mbomou River Bomu River
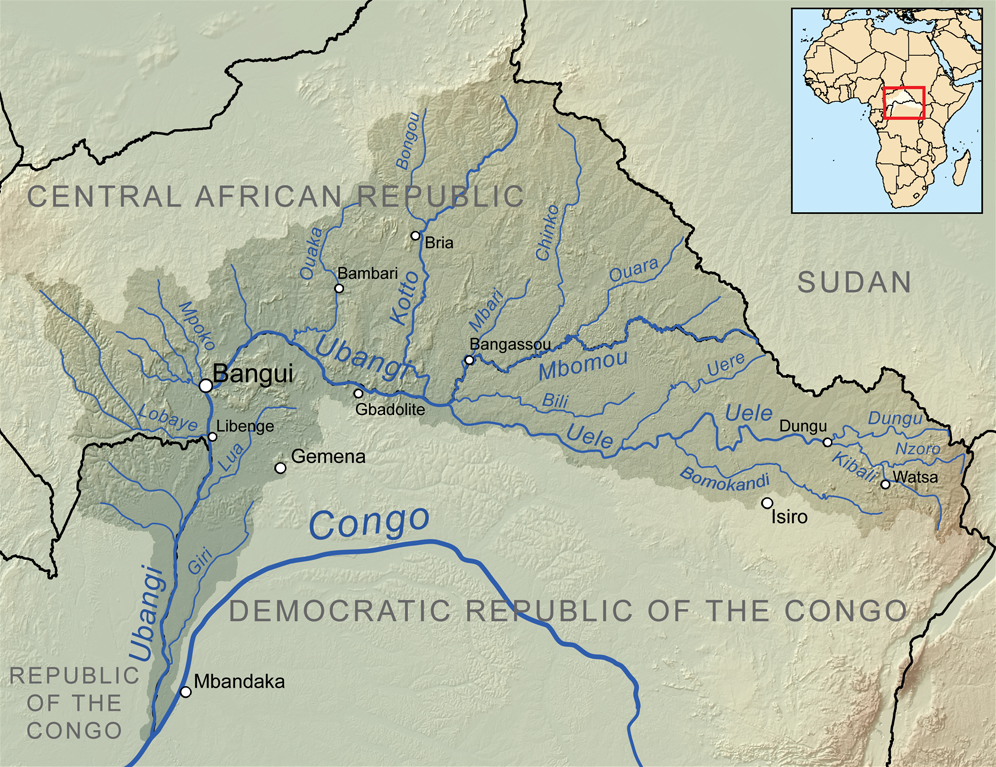
- Map showing the Mbomou River within the Ubangi River drainage basin

- Location within Democratic Republic of the Congo
- Native name: French: M'bomou

Physical characteristics
- Source
  - coordinates: 4.129°N 22.436°E

Basin features
- River system: Congo Basin

The Mbomou River or Bomu (also spelled M'bomou in French) forms part of the boundary between the Central African Republic (CAR) and the Democratic Republic of the Congo (DRC).

The Mbomou merges with the Uele River to form the Ubangi River. The Ubangi, a tributary of the Congo, also serves as part of the border between the CAR and the DRC.

== Gallery ==
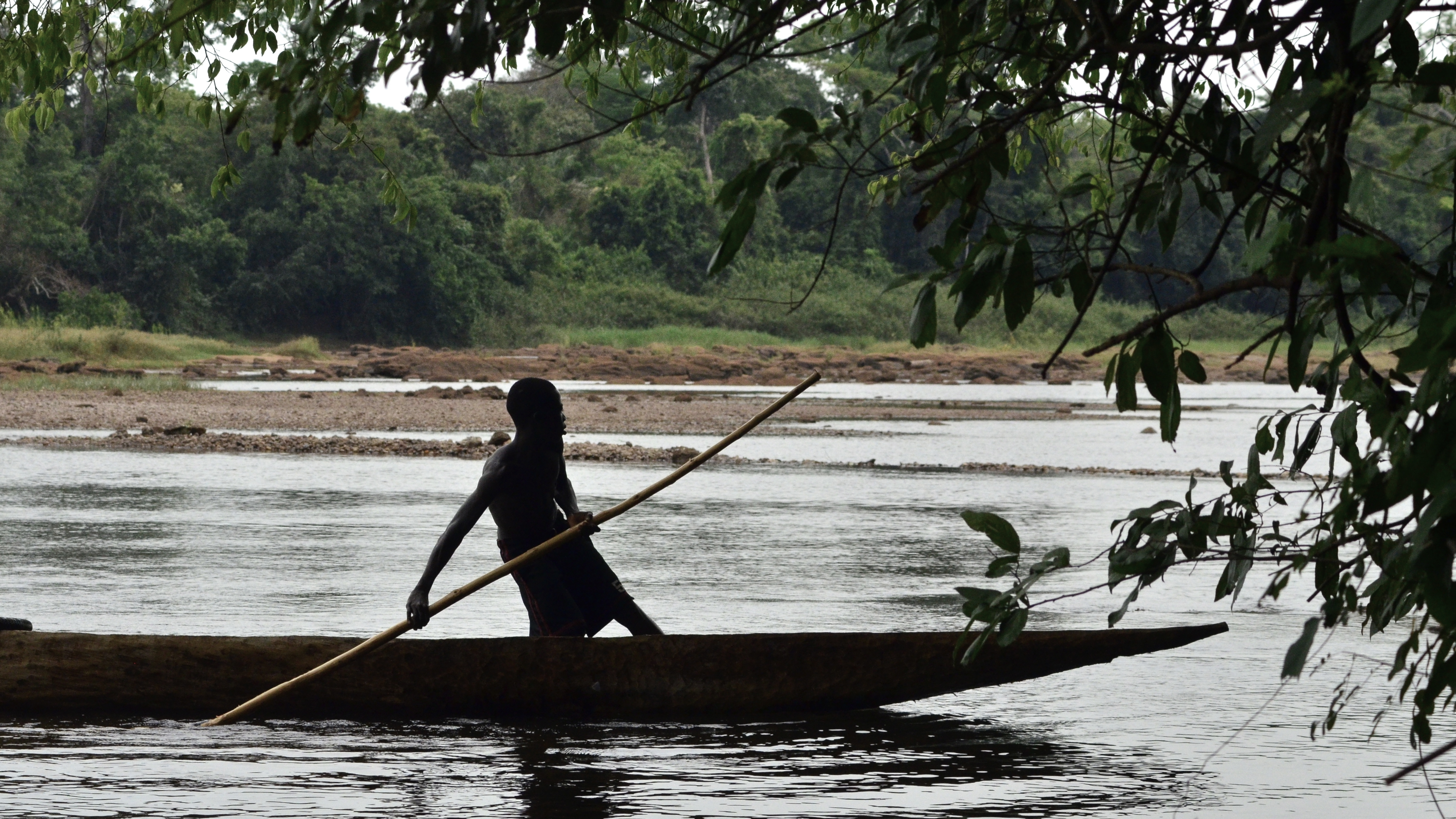
Man on the Mbomou river, between Bangassou and Ndu
