= Yakoma, Democratic Republic of the Congo =

Yakoma
- Commune
- Location within Democratic Republic of the Congo
- Coordinates: 4.098178°N 22.44318°E
- Country: DR Congo
- Province: Nord-Ubangi
- Territory: Yakoma

Population
  - Estimate (2012): 12,210
- Time zone: UTC+1 (West Africa Time)

Yakoma is a town in the Nord-Ubangi province of the Democratic Republic of the Congo (DRC) and is the headquarters of the Yakoma Territory.

== Location ==
Yakoma lies on the south bank of the Uele River at the point where that river enters the Ubangi River. The Ubangi defines the border between the DRC and the Central African Republic. Although it rains throughout the year, the rainy season is from late March to early November, with the period from May to August being wettest. Dews are frequent at all times of the year.

== History ==
The government of the Congo Free State established a post at Yakoma for collection of ivory and rubber. It lay opposite the original French capital of Ubangi-Shari (the present–day Central African Republic) at les Abiras. In 1894 and 1895, the initial settlers of the area extracted the resources by force. A traveler who visited the post at Yakoma in 1905 noted the workers were paid, but primary in the form of beads and salt rather than currency.

Sleeping sickness seems to have been introduced to the area through the rise in canoe traffic to provision the colonial posts along the river from Libenge to Yakoma. A lazaret was established in 1909 in an attempt to deal with the problem, despite lack of support from the territorial administration. More than 200 victims were buried at Yakoma between November 1910 and August 1911. By November 1912 as many as 70% of the people in some villages had been infected.

Today there is a hospital in the town with 91 beds and an occupancy rate of 70%–90%. As of 2007 there were two doctors associated with the hospital and 13 nurses.

== Demographics ==
As of 2012 the population was estimated as 12,210.

== Sources ==
- Blaes, X. (October 2008). "Découpage administratif de la République Démocratique du Congo" (PDF). PNUD-SIG. Archived from the original (PDF) on 2010-04-01.
- Dorman, Marcus (1905). A Journal of a Tour in the Congo Free State. Echo Library. ISBN 1-4068-4027-0.
- Knox, Alexander (2011). The Climate of the Continent of Africa. Cambridge University Press. ISBN 978-1-107-60071-3.
- Lyons, Maryinez (2002). The Colonial Disease: A Social History of Sleeping Sickness in Northern Zaire, 1900-1940. Cambridge University Press. ISBN 0-521-52452-0.
- Medics without Vacation. "Hôpital Général de Yakoma".
- World Gazetteer. "Yakoma".
