= Ubangi River =

Tributary of the Congo River

Ubangi River Oubangui
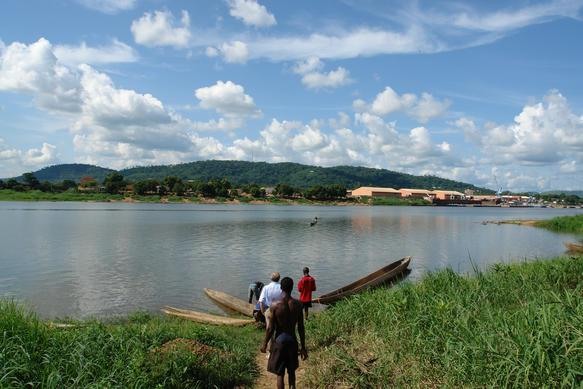
- Ubangi River at the outskirts of Bangui

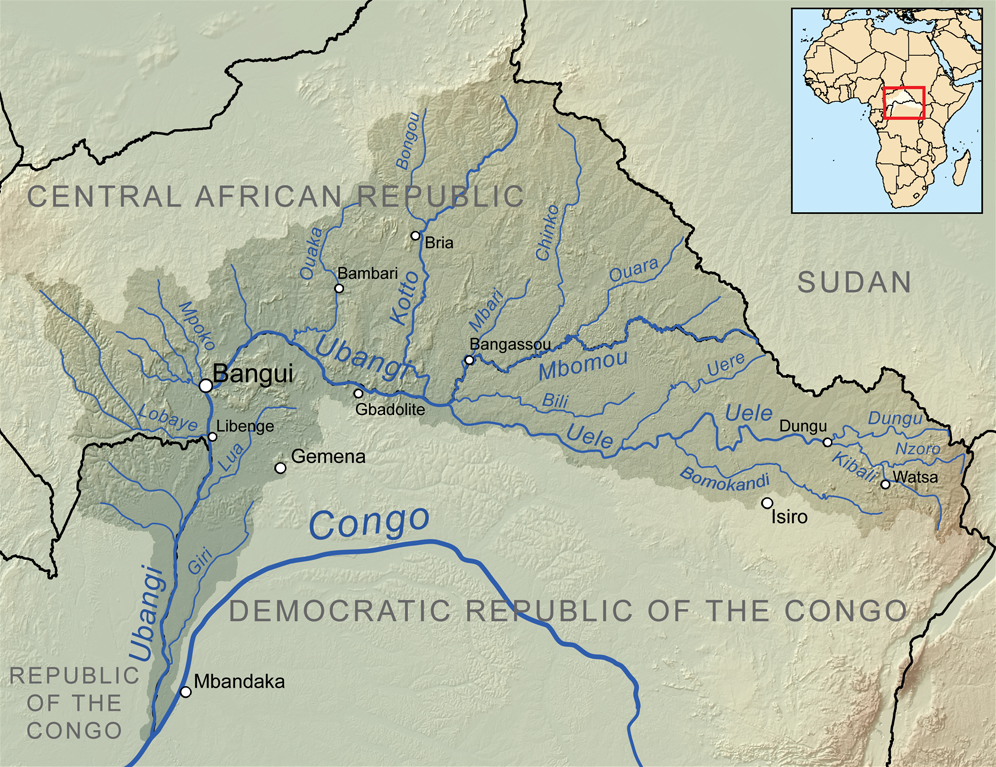
- Map showing the Ubangi River drainage basin

Physical characteristics
- Source: Confluence of Uele and Mbomou
  - coordinates: 4°7′41.2824″N 22°25′59.682″E
  - elevation: 395 m (1,296 ft)
- Mouth: Congo River
  - coordinates: 0°30′25.0992″S 17°42′20.4084″E
  - elevation: 294 m (965 ft)
- Length: 1,060 km (660 mi) to 1,120 km (700 mi)
- Basin size: 648,280.5 km^{2} (250,302.5 mi^{2}) to 651,915 km^{2} (251,706 mi^{2})
- Discharge
  - location: Near mouth
  - average: (Period: 1971–2000)5,630.4 m^{3}/s (198,840 cu ft/s) (Period: 1911–1994)5,936 m^{3}/s (209,600 cu ft/s)
  - minimum: 1,000 m^{3}/s (35,000 cu ft/s)
  - maximum: 15,500 m^{3}/s (550,000 cu ft/s)
- Discharge
  - location: Bangui (550 km upstream of mouth; Basin size: 493,266.9 km^{2} (190,451.4 sq mi)
  - average: (Period: 1971–2000)4,004 m^{3}/s (141,400 cu ft/s) (Period: 1911–1994)4,092 m^{3}/s (144,500 cu ft/s) 4,000 m^{3}/s (140,000 cu ft/s)
  - minimum: 800 m^{3}/s (28,000 cu ft/s) (Period: 1911–1994)930 m^{3}/s (33,000 cu ft/s)
  - maximum: 11,000 m^{3}/s (390,000 cu ft/s) (Period: 1911–1994)9,115 m^{3}/s (321,900 cu ft/s)
- Discharge
  - location: Yakoma (1,120 km upstream of mouth; Basin size: 308,763.1 km^{2} (119,214.1 sq mi)
  - average: (Period: 1971–2000)2,799 m^{3}/s (98,800 cu ft/s)

Basin features
- Progression: Congo → Atlantic Ocean
- River system: Congo River
- Tributaries
  - left: Uele, Lua, Giri
  - right: Mbomou, Kotto, Ouaka, Mpoko, Lobaye

The Ubangi River (/(j)uːˈbæŋɡi/; Swahili: Mto Ubangi; French: Fleuve Oubangui; Dutch: Mubangi Stroom), also spelled Oubangui, is a river in Central Africa, and the largest right-bank tributary of the Congo River. It begins at the confluence of the Mbomou (mean annual discharge 1,350 m^{3}/s) and Uele Rivers (mean annual discharge 1,550 m^{3}/s) and flows west, forming the border between Central African Republic (CAR) and the Democratic Republic of the Congo (DRC). Subsequently, the Ubangi bends to the southwest and passes through Bangui, the capital of the CAR, after which it flows south – forming the border between the DRC and the Republic of the Congo. The Ubangi finally joins the Congo River at Liranga.

The Ubangi's length is about 1,060 km (660 mi). Its total length with the Uele, its longest tributary, is 2,270 km (1,410 mi). The Ubangi's drainage basin is about 651,915 km^{2} (251,706 mi^{2}). Its discharge at Bangui ranges from about 800 m^{3}/s (28,000 cu ft/s) to 11,000 m^{3}/s (390,000 cu ft/s), with an average flow of about ~4,000 m^{3}/s (140,000 cu ft/s). Its mean annual discharge at the mouth is around ~6,000 m^{3}/s (210,000 cu ft/s). It is believed that the Ubangi's upper reaches originally flowed into the Chari River and Lake Chad before being captured by the Congo in the early Pleistocene.

Together with the Congo River, it provides an important transport artery for river boats between Bangui and Brazzaville. From its source to 100 km (62 mi) below Bangui, the Ubangi defines the boundary between the Central African Republic and the Democratic Republic of the Congo (DRC). Thereafter, it forms the boundary between the DRC and the Republic of Congo until it empties into the Congo River.

Transaqua scheme (in red)

== Lake Chad replenishment project ==
In the 1960s, a plan was proposed to divert waters from the Ubangi to the Chari River. According to the plan, named Transaqua, the water from the Ubangi would revitalize Lake Chad and provide a livelihood in fishing and enhanced agriculture to tens of millions of central Africans and Sahelians. Inter-basin water transfer schemes were proposed in the 1980s and 1990s by Nigerian engineer J. Umolu and the Italian firm Bonifica.

In 1994, the Lake Chad Basin Commission (LCBC) proposed a similar project, and at a March 2008 summit the heads of state of the LCBC member countries committed to the diversion project. In April 2008, the LCBC advertised a request for proposals for a feasibility study.
