= List of rivers of the Central African Republic =

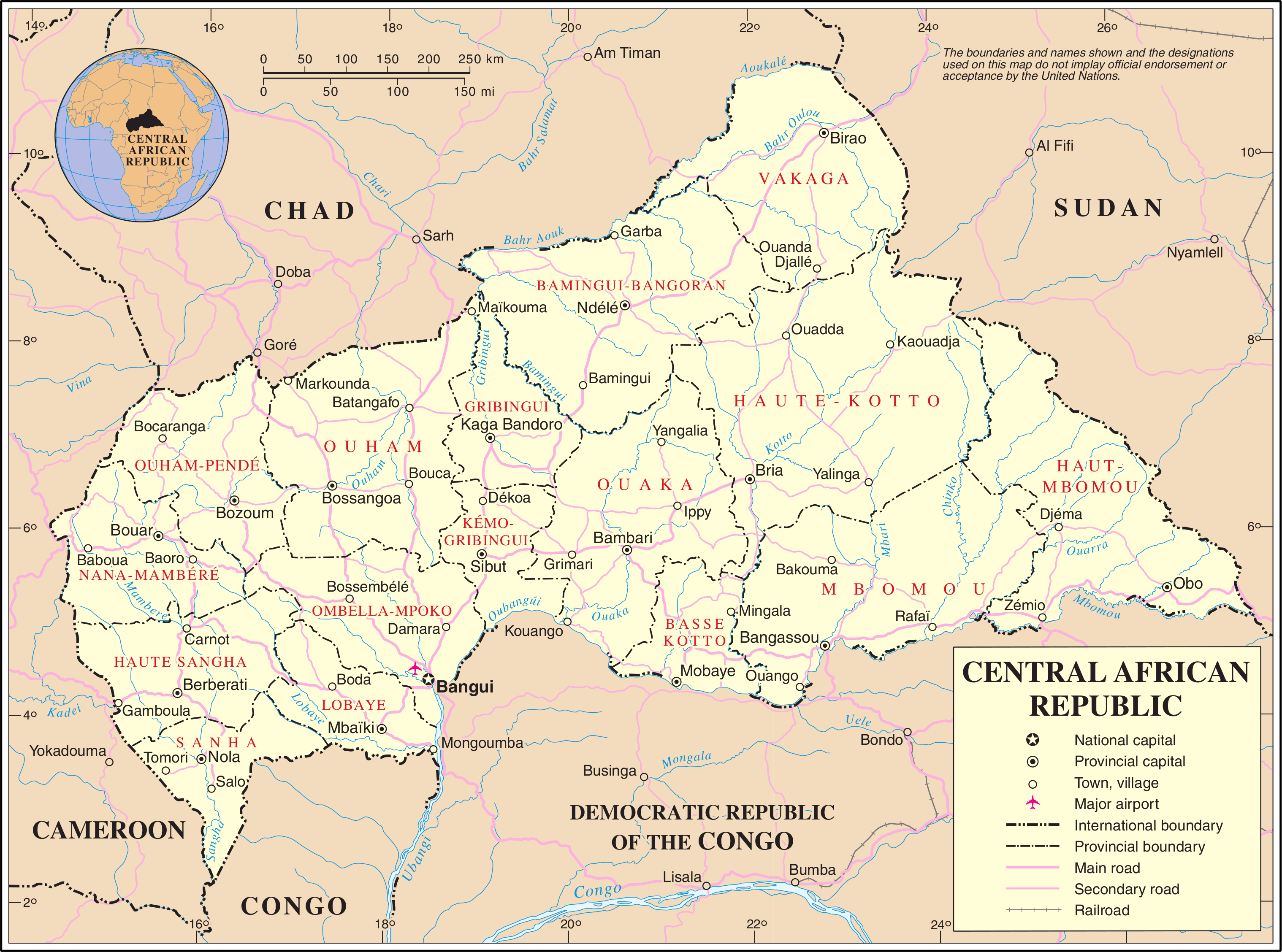
Map of the Central African Republic with the main rivers.

This is a list of rivers in Central African Republic. This list is arranged by drainage basin, with respective tributaries indented under each larger stream's name.

== Gulf of Guinea ==
- Sanaga River (Cameroon)
  - Lom River

== Atlantic Ocean ==
- Congo River (Democratic Republic of the Congo, Republic of the Congo)
  - Sangha River
    - Kadéï River
      - Boumbé I River
      - Boumbé II River
    - Mambéré River
  - Ubangi River
    - Lobaye River
    - Mpoko River
      - Mbali River
    - Ouaka River
    - Kotto River
      - Ndji River
      - Bongou River
    - Mbomou River
      - Mbari River
        - Gboyo River
      - Chinko River
      - Ouara River

== Lake Chad ==
- Chari River
  - Logone River
    - Pendé River
    - Mbéré River
  - Ouham River (Bahr Sarh)
    - Nana Barya River
    - Fala River
  - Bahr Aouk River (Aoukalé)
    - Bahr Kameur (Bahr Oulou)
      - Gounda River
      - Vakaga River
        - Ouandija River
      - Ouadi Tiwal
      - Yata River
  - Bangoran River
  - Bamingui River
  - Gribingui River
