= List of rivers of Chad =

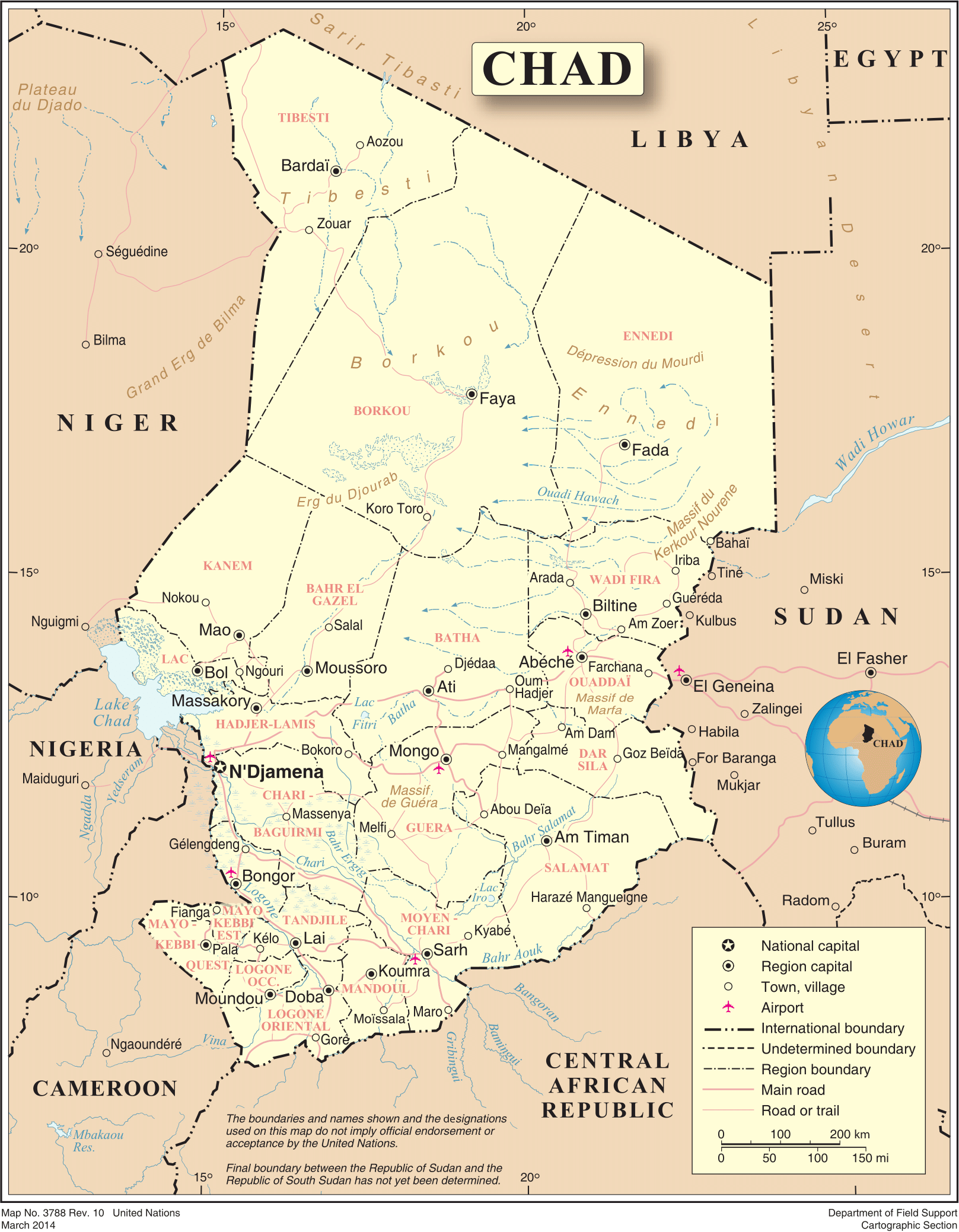
Map of Chad showing the main rivers and tributaries.

This is a list of rivers in Chad. This list is arranged by drainage basin, with respective tributaries indented under each larger stream's name.

== Gulf of Guinea ==
- Niger River (Nigeria)
  - Benue River (Nigeria)
    - Mayo Kébbi

== Lake Chad ==
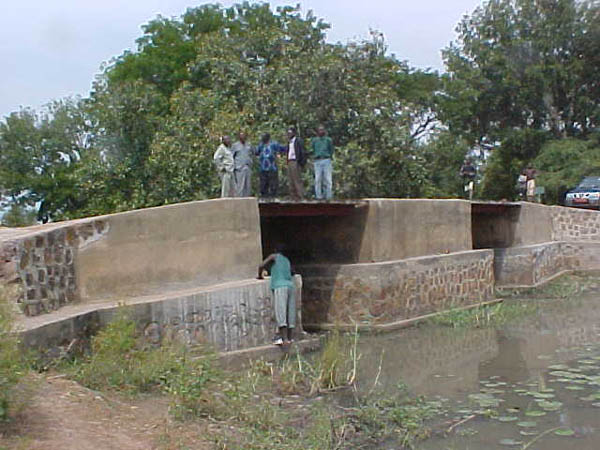
Rebuilt bridge on Bragoto River

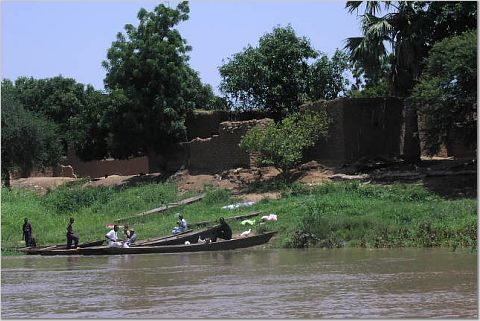
Chari River

- Chari River
  - Logone River
    - Pendé River
    - Mbéré River
  - Bahr Erguig
  - Bahr Salamat
    - Bahr Azoum
      - Ouadi Kadja
  - Ouham River
    - Nana Barya
  - Bahr Kéita
  - Ko River
    - Bragoto River
  - Bahr Aouk (Aoukalé)
- Bahr el Ghazal

== Lake Fitri ==
- Batha River

== Darfur ==
- Wadi Howar
