= Central African nationality law =

Central African Nationality Code

Parliament of the Central African Republic
- Long title: Code de la nationalité centrafricaine, Loi n° 1961.212 du 20 avril 1961
- Enacted by: Government of the Central African Republic
- Status: Current legislation

Central African nationality law is regulated by the Constitution of the Central African Republic, as amended; the Central African Republic's Nationality Code, and its revisions; and various international agreements to which the country is a signatory. These laws determine who is, or is eligible to be, a national of the Central African Republic. The legal means to acquire nationality, formal legal membership in a nation, differ from the domestic relationship of rights and obligations between a national and the nation, known as citizenship. Central African nationality is typically obtained under the principle of jus sanguinis, i.e. by birth in the Central African Republic or abroad to parents with Central African nationality. It can be granted to persons with an affiliation to the country, or to a permanent resident who has lived in the country for a given period of time through naturalization.

== Acquisition of nationality ==
Nationality can be acquired in the Central African Republic at birth or later in life through naturalization.

=== By birth ===
Those who acquire nationality at birth include:

- Children born anywhere who have at least one parent who is a native-born Central African national; (Note: Justin Maxime Kpatamango, head of the Political and Administrative Affairs division of the Ministry of the Interior in 2007, noted that minor children born abroad to at least one parent who was Central African could be naturalized without verifying a residency period. That is at odds with academic Bronwyn Manby, who indicates that birth abroad is an automatic right from birth.)
- Children born in the Central African Republic who are at least twelve years old and under the age of majority regardless of the nationality of their parents; or (Note: Manby notes that the acquisition of nationality is more difficult for parents claiming nationality on behalf of children whose birth has not been registered or whose parents are non-nationals.)
- Foundlings or orphans discovered in the territory whose parents are unknown.

=== By naturalization ===
Naturalization can be granted to persons who have resided in the territory for a sufficient period of time to confirm they understand the customs and traditions of the society. General provisions are that applicants have made investment in real estate or agriculture, have received a national honor, and have resided in the country for thirty-five years. The residency investigation must confirm that in the five years immediately preceding application for naturalization, the person has continuously lived in the Central African Republic. Applicants are required to submit documentation including their current passport and residency permit, a medical certification, and verification of their criminal history and proof of investment in property. As of 2012, the administrative fees to process an application for naturalization were 5 million XAF (equivalent to €7,622.45 or $9,021.62 US). After investigation of an applicant, nationalization occurs by a presidential decree. Besides foreigners meeting the criteria, other persons who may be naturalized include:

- The wife of a Central African national automatically derives her husband's nationality upon marriage;
- The husband of a Central African national may naturalize after two years residency;
- Persons born in the Central African Republic who did not acquire nationality prior to the age of majority can naturalize after two years residency;
- Children and the wife of a naturalized foreigner may naturalize without a residency period when the father/husband acquires nationality;
- Children who are legitimated by a father, automatically acquire his nationality upon completion of a legitimizing adoption
- Adoptees whose parents are Central African can choose to obtain nationality in the Central African Republic and can naturalize without confirming residency upon reaching majority; or
- A foreigner who has performed exceptional services in the fields of art, business, or science can naturalize without confirming residency.

== Loss of nationality ==
Nationality may be lost in the Central African Republic for acting in the service of a foreign government or as a national of another country; having dual citizenship; committing crimes against the state or ordinary crimes; or for fraud in a naturalization petition, or disloyal or treasonous acts.

== Dual nationality ==
Dual nationality in the Central African Republic is only allowed in the instance of a wife marrying a Central African and not giving up her nationality of origin.

== History ==
=== African kingdoms (1600–1894) ===
Central Africa was a crossroads during the seventeenth- and eighteenth-century expansion of the slave trade. Among the peoples who inhabited the region were the Azande, Banda, Gbaya, Kresh, and Sabanga peoples. From the mid-seventeenth century, slave raiders from the Wadai Sultanate in present-day Chad, were operating in the region. At the end of the seventeenth century, a clan of the Ngbandi people, known as the Bandia, traveled from southern side of the Ubangi River into Zandeland and established several kingdoms. Among the Bandia Kingdoms were what would become the Sultanates of Bangassou and Rafaï in the southeastern part of what is now known as the Central African Republic and the Sultanate of Djabir in the Democratic Republic of the Congo. The territory over which they ruled stretched between the Uele and Mbomou rivers. Around 1790 Ndounga, founded the Nzakara Kingdom on the Mbari River subjugating the Nzakara people. In 1878, the kingdom became the Bangassou Sultanate under Ndounga's great-great grandson. Around 1800, Ndounga's brother, Kassanga, founded on the Chinko River the Chinko Kingdom, which would become the Rafaï Sultanate under his great-grandson. In 1830, other states arose, including the Sultanate of Dar al-Kuti and the Zande Kingdom of Nounga, located between the Chinko and Uele Rivers, which would later be ruled by his son as the Sultanate of Zémio. These kingdoms prospered during the 19th century, avoiding raids by slave traders, by participating in the slave trade.

Extensive trade routes were built operating seaward to Cairo, Darfur and Tripoli in the north and the Congo Basin in the south. Though they exchanged honey, ivory, and wax for cloth and metal goods, the overwhelming focus was on slaves, which led to endemic upheaval, violence and raiding. In 1889 the French established a trading post at Bangui and in 1890 Paul Crampel launched an exploratory mission of the Ubangi River. Though he was killed in 1891, other explorers in the territory spent the next six years securing treaties with the natives along the Ubangi and Sangha Rivers to establish protectorates over the region. Warlords Rabih az-Zubayr and his successor, Muhammad al-Sanusi, who operated out of Gribindji at the head of the Gribingui River, were particularly brutal and responsible for mass exterminations in their raiding practices between 1890 and 1911 and clashed often with the French.

=== French period (1894–1960) ===
The French established a protectorate over Ubangi-Shari in 1894, having previously laid claim to French Congo, also known as Moyen-Congo, and Gabon. In 1896, a French military expedition left Gabon with the intent of linking all of the French territory from Senegal on the Atlantic coast to French Somaliland on the coast of the Arabian Sea. Seen by the British as an attempt to thwart their expansion from north to south, the two powers clashed during the Fashoda incident and France abandoned its plan retreating to Bangui in 1899. Unwilling to foot the expense of a colony, the French licensed over three dozen private companies in 1899, to operate in the extensive territory and in exchange for their monopoly to exploit resources paid an annual fee to the French government. Fifteen of the companies were based in Ubangi-Shari. Around the same time, the French expanded northwards to create a military buffer zone in Chad. On 29 December 1903, Ubangi-Shari was formally decreed as a colony and two years later was merged with Chad into a single territory. In 1909 the Sultanates of Bangassou, Rafaï, and Zemio, signed treaties to become protectorates of France and were incorporated into the Colony of Ubangi-Shari-Chad. The following year, the French federated their colonies of French Gabon, Moyen-Congo, and Ubangi-Shari-Chad into French Equatorial Africa. Chad was detached from the colony in 1914.

In 1848, slavery was abolished throughout the French Empire and the Civil Code was extended to all of the French citizens in the colonies. Under the Civil Code, women were legally incapacitated and paternal authority was established over their children. Upon marriage, a woman married to a French man automatically acquired the same nationality as her spouse. Illegitimate children were barred from inheritance and nationality could only be transmitted through a father. Non-citizen nationals were governed by traditional laws concerning marriage and inheritance which placed the well-being of the community above individual rights. These laws prevented a wife from being treated as a slave, required her husband to support her, and entitled her kin to a bride price, to compensate them for the loss of her fertility to their kinship group and secure the legality of the union. Having paid the price for the marriage contract, she and her offspring belonged to the kinship network of her husband and could be inherited if her husband died.

The French Nationality Law of 1889 codified previous statutory laws, changing the French standard from jus sanguinis to jus soli and was extended to the French West Indies. Under its terms, women who would become stateless by the rule to acquire their spouse's nationality were allowed to retain their French nationality upon marriage. The Nationality Law was modified in 1897 when it was extended to the remainder of the French colonies. Clarification in the 1897 decree included that bestowing nationality by birth in French territory only applied to children born in France, restoring descent requirements for the colonies. Under the Code de l'indigénat (Code of Indigenous Status) promulgated for Algeria in 1881 and extended to French Equatorial Africa in 1910, nationals in the new colonies followed customary law. On 23 May 1912, a decree was issued specifically addressing the status of French Equatorial Africans. Under its terms, native persons born in Equatorial Africa were nationals of France but not citizens and were subject to the Indigenous Code. Upon reaching the age of twenty-one, they could be naturalized; however, the law was explicit that neither a wife nor the children of a naturalized Equatorial African automatically derived his French nationality. Only if the spouses were married under French law and the children registered in the Civil Registry could they acquire the status of the husband or father. (Note: Yerri Urban, a public law lecturer at the University of the French Antilles notes that at the time the law went into effect, there were no provisions to allow native Africans to register births in the European Civil Registry.) To naturalize Equatorial Africans had to be able to both read and write French and had to have served in the French military service or have been decorated with the Legion of Honor.

Following the end of World War I France passed a law, "Décret N°. 24 on 25 March 1915 that allowed subjects or protected persons who were non-citizen nationals and had established domicile in a French territory to acquire full citizenship, including the naturalization of their wives and minor children, by having received the cross of the Legion of Honor, having obtained a university degree, having rendered service to the nation, having attained the rank of an officer or received a medal from the French army, who had married a Frenchwoman and established a one-year residency; or who had resided for more than ten years in a colony other than their country of origin. A 14 January 1918 decree written for Equatorial Africa and French West Africa was aimed to provide naturalization for decorated veterans of the war and their families, providing they had not previously been denied their rights nor participated in actions against French rule.

In 1927, France passed a new Nationality Law, which under Article 8, removed the requirement for married women to automatically derive the nationality of a husband and provided that her nationality could only be changed if she consented to change her nationality. It also allowed children born in France to native-born French women married to foreigners to acquire their nationality from their mothers. When it was implemented it included Guadeloupe, Martinique and Réunion but was extended to the remaining French possessions for French citizens only in 1928. Under Article 26 of the 1928 decree was the stipulation that it did not apply to natives of the French possessions except Algeria, Guadeloupe, Martinique, and Réunion. A decade later, the legal incapacity of married women was finally invalidated for French citizens. In 1939, France determined that marriage and inheritance were too significant to continue being dealt with in native courts. That year, the Mandel Decree was enacted in French West Africa as well as French Equatorial Africa. Under its terms child marriage was discouraged. It established the minimum age at marriage as fourteen for women and sixteen for men, invalidated marriages wherein spouses did not consent, and nullified levirate marriage without approval of the woman.

At the end of World War II, a statute issued on 7 March 1944 granted French citizenship to those who had performed services to the nation, such as serving as civil servants or receiving recognitions. The Constitution of 1946 granted French citizenship to all subjects of France's territories without having to renounce their personal status as natives. Under its terms, Ubangi-Shari was classified as an Overseas Territory within the French Union. In 1945, a new Code of French Nationality was passed, which conferred once again automatic French nationality on foreign wives of French men, but allowed mothers who were French nationals to pass their nationality to children born outside of France. It expressly applied to Algeria, French Guiana, Guadeloupe, Martinique and Réunion and was extended to the Overseas Territories in 1953, but in the case of the latter had distinctions for the rights of those who were naturalized.

In 1951 the Jacquinot Decree strengthened the provisions in French West and Equatorial Africa of the Mandel decree removing women who were twenty-one years old, or divorced, from control by a father or guardian and establishing specific rules for the payment and determining the amount of a bride price. In 1958, Ubangi-Shari voted to join the French Community, as an autonomous member and promulgated the first constitution for the country on 16 February 1959. With the passage of the 1958 French Constitution, nationality provisions were standardized for France, Overseas Departments, and Overseas Territories. Article 86 excluded the possibility for independence of the colonies. The French Constitution was amended on 1960 to allow states to maintain membership in the Community even if they were independent republics. In July 1960, negotiations in Paris set terms for independence and a transfer of power.

=== Post-independence (1960–present) ===
Ubangi-Shari gained independence on 13 August 1960, as the Central African Republic. Subsequently, on 20 April 1961, the Nationality Code (Loi n° 1961.212) was passed. The law was amended on 2 December 1964 (Loi n° 1964/54) and again on 30 August 1966 (Ordonnance n° 1966/64). By an amendment of 12 April 1984 (Ordonnance n° 84.Q22) the changes made in 1966 to Articles 27, 28, and 91 of the Nationality Code were repealed. Reviews by non-governmental agencies, such as the Committee on the Elimination of Discrimination against Women, the Committee on the Rights of the Child, and the World Bank have indicated that discrepancies exist between constitutional rights and legislative provisions, as well as between the Nationality and Family Codes in the Central African Republic. According to the CEDAW committee, the present nationality code violates equality provisions in other legislation by having different standards for acquiring nationality by male and female spouses. A World Bank study in 2012, noted the same discrepancy and also that though the Family Code protects households headed by women, illegitimate children are considered to have the nationality of the mother's brothers, indicating that nationality passes only through the male line. It also pointed out that in a joint adoption, the child's name and nationality can only be derived from the male. In 2021, it was announced that revisions to the first Family Code, adopted in 1997, were pending review by the Texts Commission and the Council of Ministers before being sent to the National Assembly for adoption.
