= Léon Hanolet =

Léon-Charles-Édouard Hanolet
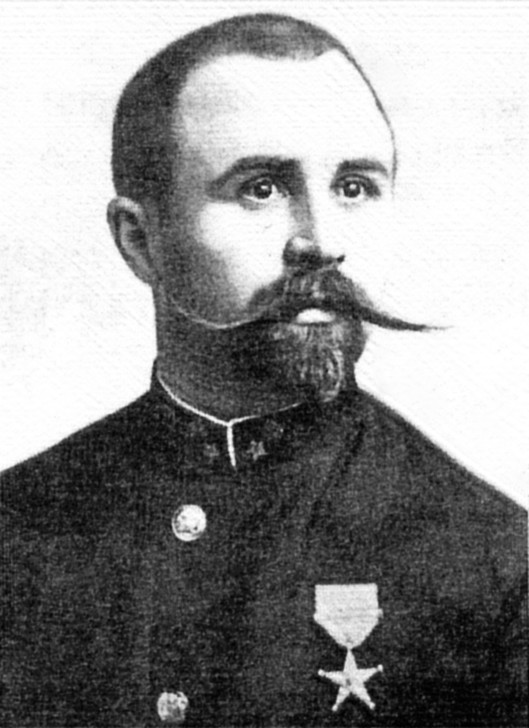
- Born: 25 November 1859; Mehaigne, Éghezée, Namur, Belgium
- Died: 1 December 1908 (aged 49)
- Occupation: Soldier

Léon-Charles-Édouard Hanolet (25 November 1859 – 1 December 1908) was a Belgian soldier, explorer and colonial administrator. He is known for his explorations in 1894–1895 in what is now the Central African Republic, which led to an agreement between France and Belgium that the Ubangi-Mbomou rivers would form the boundary between their territories. He defended the Lado Enclave against the retreating Mahdist forces in 1898.

== Early years (1859–1888) ==
Léon-Charles-Édouard Hanolet was born in Mehaigne, Éghezée, Namur, Belgium on 25 November 1859. He made his career as a soldier. He enlisted in the 6th line regiment. On 25 June 1883 he was appointed second lieutenant in the 13th line regiment. In 1888 he volunteered to serve in the Congo Free State.

== First Congo tour: Zongo (1888–1891) ==
Congo Free State

Hanolet embarked for Africa on 17 June 1888. Henri Avaert arrived in Boma on 21 September 1888, where he assumed command of the Force Publique from Léon Roget. He was assisted by lieutenants Fiévez, Debergh and Hanolet, 13 Belgian non-commissioned officers and soldiers, and 28 Hausa or Bangala instructors.

After a few months with Avaert in Bas-Congo Hanolet was attached to the fourth Ubangi expedition, organized by Alphonse van Gèle. The expedition left Léopoldville on 21 May 1889 in the steamers En Avant and Association internationale Africaine, and a large canoe. It was led by Van Gèle and included district commissioner Georges le Marinel, Hanolet, lieutenant Édouard De Rechter and sub-lieutenant Léon Busine.

The expedition reached Zongo on 25 June 1889, where a station was founded as a base of operations with Hanolet in command. The Association internationale Africaine was almost lost in the Zongo rapids. Hanolet commanded this post for two years, assisted by Busine. The French founded the post of Bangui opposite Zongo soon after. Hanolet was reported to have forcibly ended the trade in slaves by the Bobangi in the Bangui-Zongo area, although slaves do not seem to have formed a significant part of the workforce. Hanolet was succeeded by Lieutenant Heymans on 15 May 1891. On 17 July 1891 he embarked for Europe from Boma.

== Second Congo tour: North of Mbomou (1892–1895) ==
Hanolet was promoted to captain-commander. On 10 May 1892 he embarked for Africa in Bordeaux, accompanied by Florimond Delanghe, and arrived in Boma on 18 June 1892. He was assigned to the Ubangi-Bomu expedition to Bangassou, commanded by Le Marinel in place of Van Gèle. Le Marinel left for Europe and was in turn replaced by Georges Adolphe Balat. Balat died on 19 April 1893 leaving Hanolet in charge of the Upper Ubangi and Mbomou.

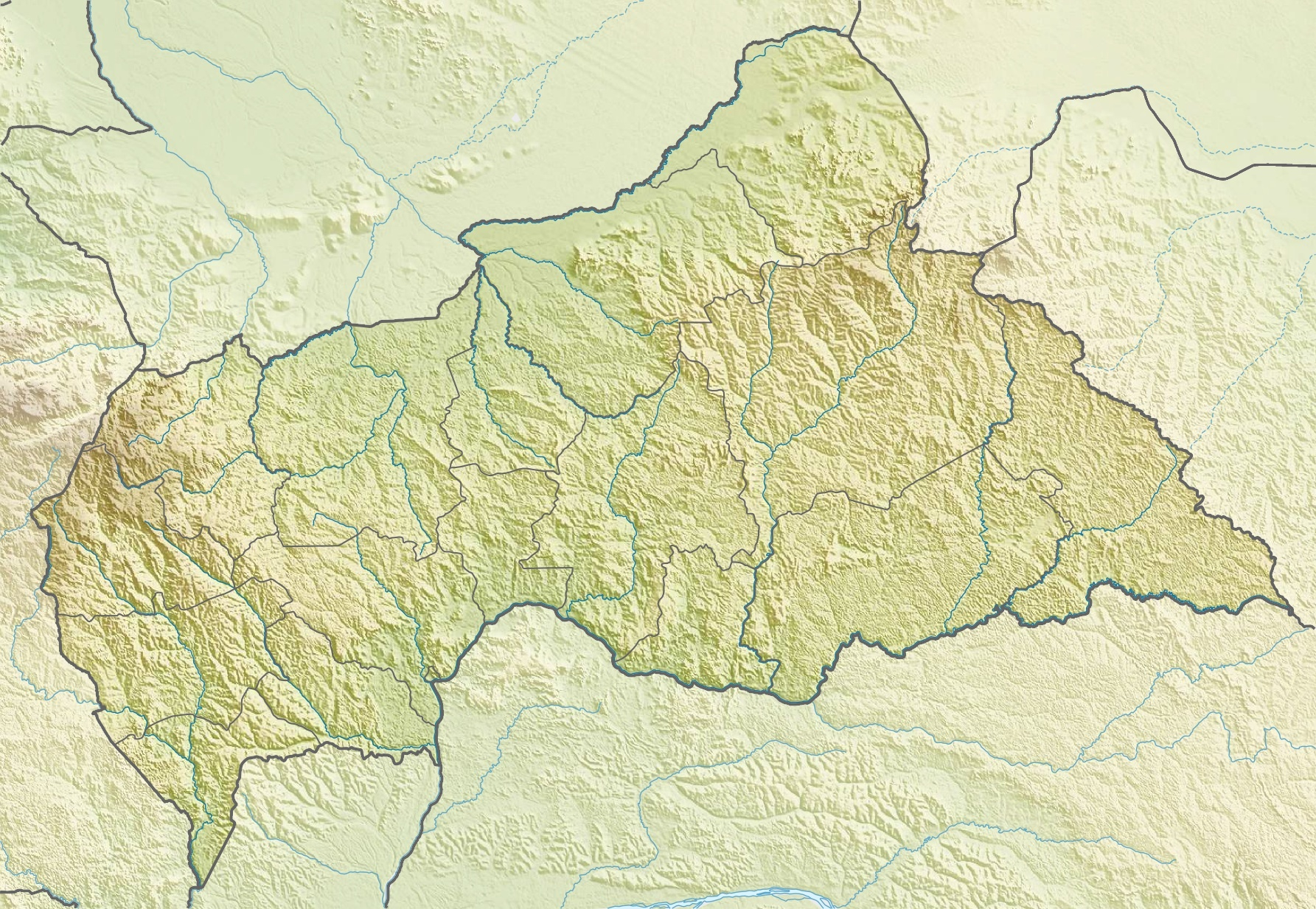
Central African Republic

Hanolet was eager to resume exploration to the north but staff shortages caused long delays. He established the post of Gandu at the confluence of the Mbomou and Chinko River, which he placed under Lieutenant Raphaël Stroobant on 30 May 1893. Soon after he appointed Stroobant to found the post of Darbaki. In October 1893 the expedition to the Chari River was assembled in Bangassou. Lieutenant Cowe, head of the Bakouma post, died on 7 October 1893. Hanolet replaced him by Gérard. He also established posts at Dabago and Sattet to secure communication with the rear. In November 1893 Le Marinel, now a state inspector, resumed command of Haut-Ubanghi-Mbomou.

In mid-December 1893 Théodore Nilis was assigned by Le Marinel to lead a reconnaissance expedition to Dār Fertit, with lieutenants Charles de la Kethulle, Gérard and Gonze as his deputies. The expedition left Bangassou on 28 December 1893, with the goal of reaching Hofrah-el-Nahas on the Bahr-el-Fertit. On 15 February 1894 it reached Sango at the confluence of the Badabo and Mbili rivers. It stopped at Katuaka (8°48′N 24°26′E), home of chief Acmed Curcia. The post later known as Fort de l'Adda was founded there, with Gérard as commander assisted by Henrion. The column was stopped by floods and did not go further. It returned via Kuria, which it reached on 1 April 1894, and on 24 April 1894 arrived at Dabago, where Hanolet was waiting. In May Nilis and de la Kethulle returned to Rafaï.

In 1894 Hanolet ascended the Mbari River, a right tributary of the Mbomou. His expedition finally left for the north in February 1894. Hanolet travelled up the valley of the Bali (Mbali) river and the upper Kotto River, following the road of the Arab caravans. His expedition reached Dabago at 6°58′0″N 23°10′0″E on the Ndji River. He described the country as flat, and sometimes walked for six hours without crossing a stream. The advance party reached Bellé (Mbélé) on 4 April 1894. Mbélé was in the Chari basin. At this time it was one of the most important trading centers of North Central Africa, with several thousand inhabitants, receiving traders from Rafaï, Zémio, Banggassou and Wadai. Hanolet joined the advance party at Mbele on 16 June 1894.

In Yango (7°54′0″N 22°44′0″E) they met nine Arab merchants from the Wadai. The merchants provided information about the Wadai and Dar Runga. Based on this, Hanolet decided to send Van Calster and Inver ahead to contact El-Senoussi, Sultan of Dar al Kuti, and ask him to submit to the Congo Free State. They pushed west from Mbélé to near El-Kouti (Châ) where Paul Crampel had been assassinated. The country had suffered repeated invasions, and the remaining inhabitants were huddled in fortified settlements. They crossed the divide between the Congo and Chad basin, a low ridge no more than 849 metres (2,785 ft) high. The intent had been to continue to Dar al-Kuti, and try to annex it to the Congo Free State, but the expedition was exhausted. The Belgians returned to Dabago on 1 November 1894, and were accompanied by a band of traders from Tripoli who were going to Bangassou.

The Belgian expeditions caused a dispute with the French that led to an agreement that the Bomu would be the northern border of the Congo Free State in this region. On 18 August 1894 France and Belgium signed a convention that established the Mbomou as the border between their colonies, so the country explored by Hanolet was now part of the French territory. Hanolet embarked from Boma on 14 April 1895 for Europe.

== Third Congo tour: Lado (1896–1899) ==
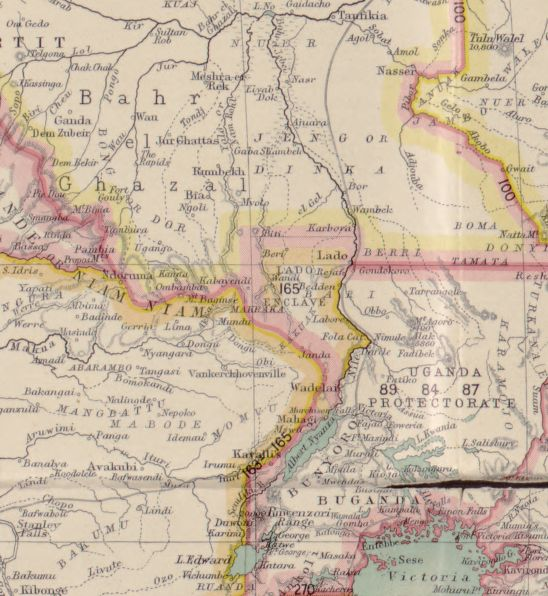
Lado enclave between the Free State and the Nile

Hanolet left Antwerp on 6 June 1896 to return for his third term, this time as a general commissioner. When he reached Boma he was appointed to the Bangale district. He reached Nouvelle-Anvers (Makanza) on 23 August 1895, where he served for more than a year. In November 1897 he took over command of the Lado Enclave from Louis-Napoléon Chaltin. He launched the armed steamer Van Kerchhoven and eight whalers on the Nile to defend Rejaf and Lado from a return of the Mahdists, who were retreating from the British in the north. Several Belgian soldiers died in a Mahdist ambush on 21 May 1898, and this was followed by a more serious attack by a group led by the Emir Adlem Bouchara at Rejaf during the night of 3–4 June 1898. During the Battle of Rejaf the Mahdists entered the enclosure but were beaten back with high casualties, including most of their leaders. About half of the African defenders were rendered hors de combat.

To guard against a renewed attack Hanolet decided to establish a post in Lado, and assigned the task to Commander Josué Henry, who arrived two weeks after the attack on Redjaf with 500 troops after defeating the rebels in the expeditionary force of Francis Dhanis. In November 1898 Honolet and Henry were visited in Lado by the English Colonel Cyril Godfrey Martyr, who had arrived from Uganda with a company of Sudanese troops to reoccupy Gondokoro and the right bank of the Nile. Hanolet handed over command to Henry on 2 January 1899 and left Redjaf. He was appointed secretary of state by the king on 1 March 1899. He left Boma for Europe on 24 March 1899.

== Later career (1901–1908) ==
On 14 March 1901 Hamolet embarked for Africa in Lisbon. As state inspector of the Uele District he paid considerable attention to registering and counting the arms and ammunitions of the local sultans. He returned to the Lado Enclave, where Chalton again handed over to him. He started construction of a road for motor vehicles to bring supplies from Dungu to Rejaf. With the threat from the Mahdists gone the region returned to peace and prosperity. At the end of his term he left Rejaf and returned to Europe on the Philippeville, reaching Antwerp on 4 August 1903. He did not resume his service with the Free State or the army, but became an administrator of the Abir Congo Company and of the American Congo Company. Hanolet died in Saint-Josse-ten-Noode, Brussels, Belgium on 1 December 1908.

== Publications ==
- Léon Hanolet (1904), "Chasses africaines", Le Mouvement Géographique, XXI
- Léon Hanolet (1895), "Notes sur la Chasse au Congo", Bulletin de la Société Belge d'Études Coloniales: 141
- Léon Hanolet (1906–1907), "Exploration au Nord du Bomu et du Bassin du Tchad-Chari", Bull. Soc. R. Géogr. Anvers: 93

== Sources ==
- Boulvert, Yves (2019), Explorations en Afrique Centrale 1790-1930 Apports des explorateurs à la connaissance du milieu (PDF)
- Bradshaw, Richard; Fandos-Rius, Juan (27 May 2016), Historical Dictionary of the Central African Republic, Rowman & Littlefield Publishers, ISBN 978-0-8108-7992-8
- Coosemans, Marthe; Jadot, J. M. (15 June 1954), "AVAERT (Henri-Michel-Eugène)" (PDF), Biographie Coloniale Belge (in French), vol. V, Inst. roy. colon. belge, pp. col.20–24
- De Roo, Bas (April 2014), "The Blurred Lines of Legality: Customs and Contraband in the Congolese M'Bomu Region, 1889-1908" (PDF), Journal of Belgian History
- Engels, A. (1951), "HANOLET (Léon-Charles-Êdouard)", Biographie Coloniale Belge (in French), vol. II, Inst. roy. colon. belge, pp. col. 448–452
- Engels, A.; Coosemans, M. (1947), "NILIS (Théodore-Victor-Edouard-Adolphe-Arthur)", Biographie Coloniale Belge (in French), vol. I, Inst. roy. colon. belge, pp. col.732–738
- Ergo, André-Bernard (2013), "Les postes fortifiés de la frontière Nord de l'État Indépendant du Congo" (PDF), Histoire du Congo, archived from the original (PDF) on 2022-05-25
- "Hanolet, Léon (Charles Édouard)", Africamuseum.be, Royal Museum for Central Africa
- Janssens, Édouard; Cateaux, Albert (1908), Les Belges au Congo: notices biographiques, Antwerp: J. van Hille-De Backer, pp. 167–182
- Samarin, William J. (11 July 2019), The Black Man's Burden: African Colonial Labor On The Congo And Ubangi Rivers, 1880-1900, Taylor & Francis, ISBN 978-1-00-031491-5
