= Logone River =

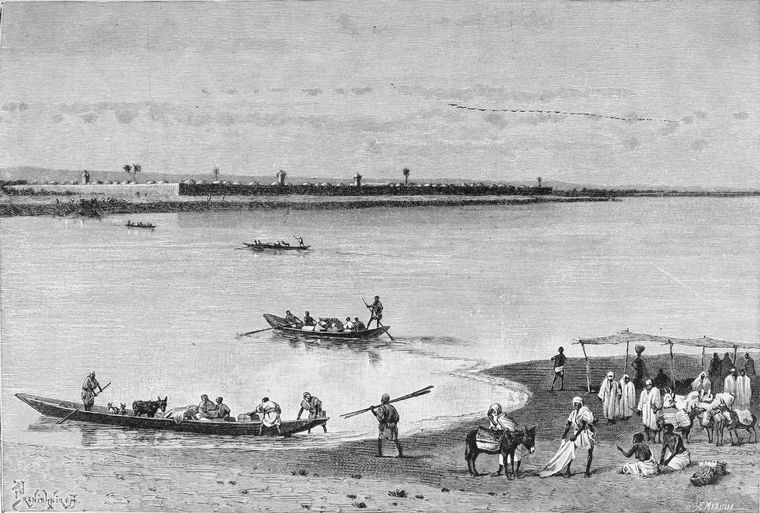
- The Logone-Birni, from the book The earth and its inhabitants, Africa 1892

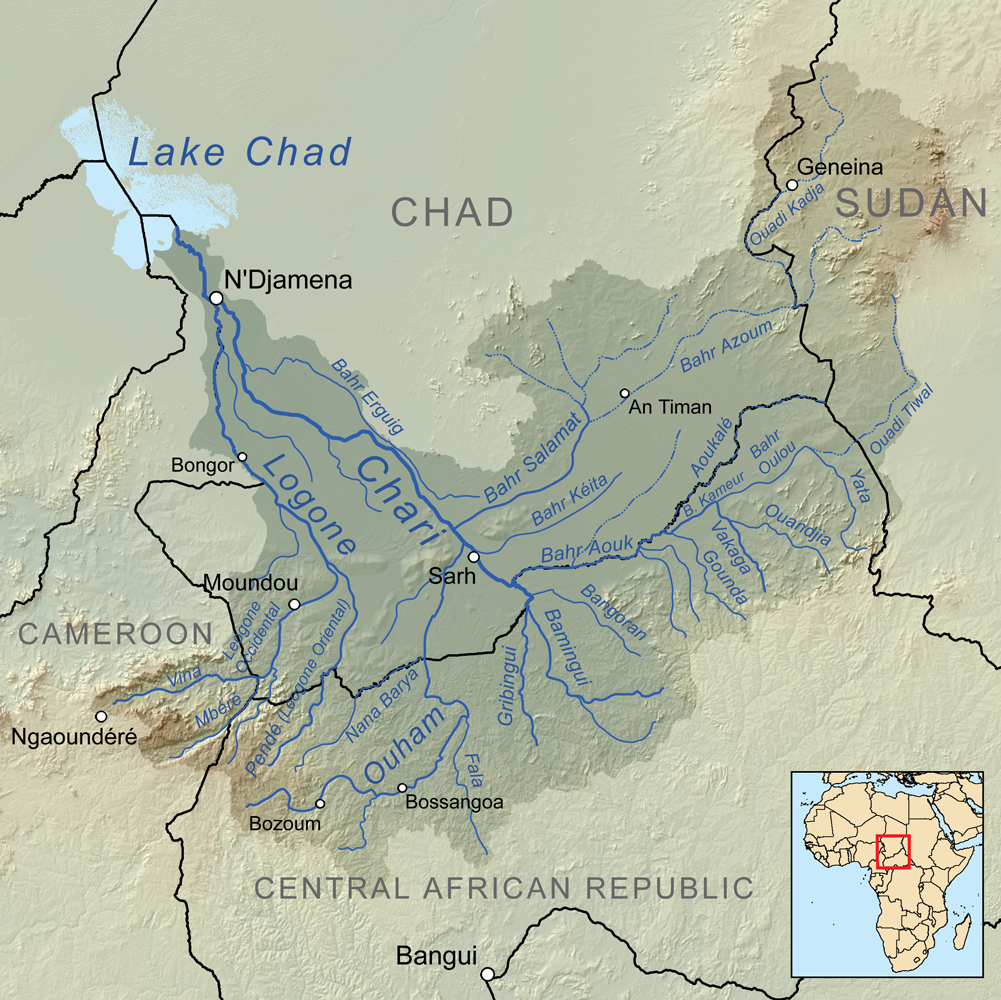
- Map showing the Logone River within the Chari River drainage basin

Location
- Countries: Chad; Cameroon
- City: Kousséri

Physical characteristics
- Source
  - location: Central African Republic
- Mouth
  - location: Chari River at N'Djaména, Chad
  - coordinates: 12°6′22″N 15°2′7″E
  - elevation: 364 m (1,194 ft)
- Length: 1,000 km (620 mi)
- Basin size: 78,000 km^{2} (30,000 sq mi)
- Discharge
  - average: 492 m^{3}/s (17,400 cu ft/s)

Basin features
- Protection status

Ramsar Wetland
- Official name: Plaines d'inondation du Logone et les dépressions Toupouri
- Designated: 14 November 2005
- Reference no.: 1560

The Logon or Logone River is a major tributary of the Chari River. The Logone's sources are located in the western Central African Republic, northern Cameroon, and southern Chad. It has two major tributaries: the Pendé River (Eastern Logone) in the prefecture Ouham-Pendé in the Central African Republic and the Mbéré River (Western Logone) in the east of Cameroon. Many swamps and wetlands surround the river.

The Logone forms part of the international border between Chad and Cameroon. Settlements on the river include Kousseri and N'Djaména, which is located at the confluence with the Chari.

== Hydrometry ==
The flow of the river has been observed over 38 years (1951–84) in Bongor, Chad, downstream of the union with the Pendé about 450 km (280 mi) above the confluence with the Chari. Average annual flow during this period was 492 m^{3}/s (17,400 cu ft/s) fed by an area of about 73,700 km^{2} (28,500 sq mi) approximately 94.5% of the total catchment area of the river. Due to the strong evaporation, the amount of water flowing into the stream decreases. In N'Djamena, the flow reduces to 400 m^{3}/s (14,000 cu ft/s).

Average monthly flow at Bongor (in m^{3} / s )
(data from 1948 to 1986)

== Population ==
In the eastern lower Logone valley formed out of the Kotoko population several historic sultanates (Kousseri, Logone-Birni, Makari-Goulfey and others) which were vassals of the Bornu or Baguirmi inside the borders of modern-day Cameroon.

== History ==
In Chad, the administrative regions Logone Oriental and Logone Occidental named after the river. Ober-Logone was an administrative district of the German colony of Cameroon.

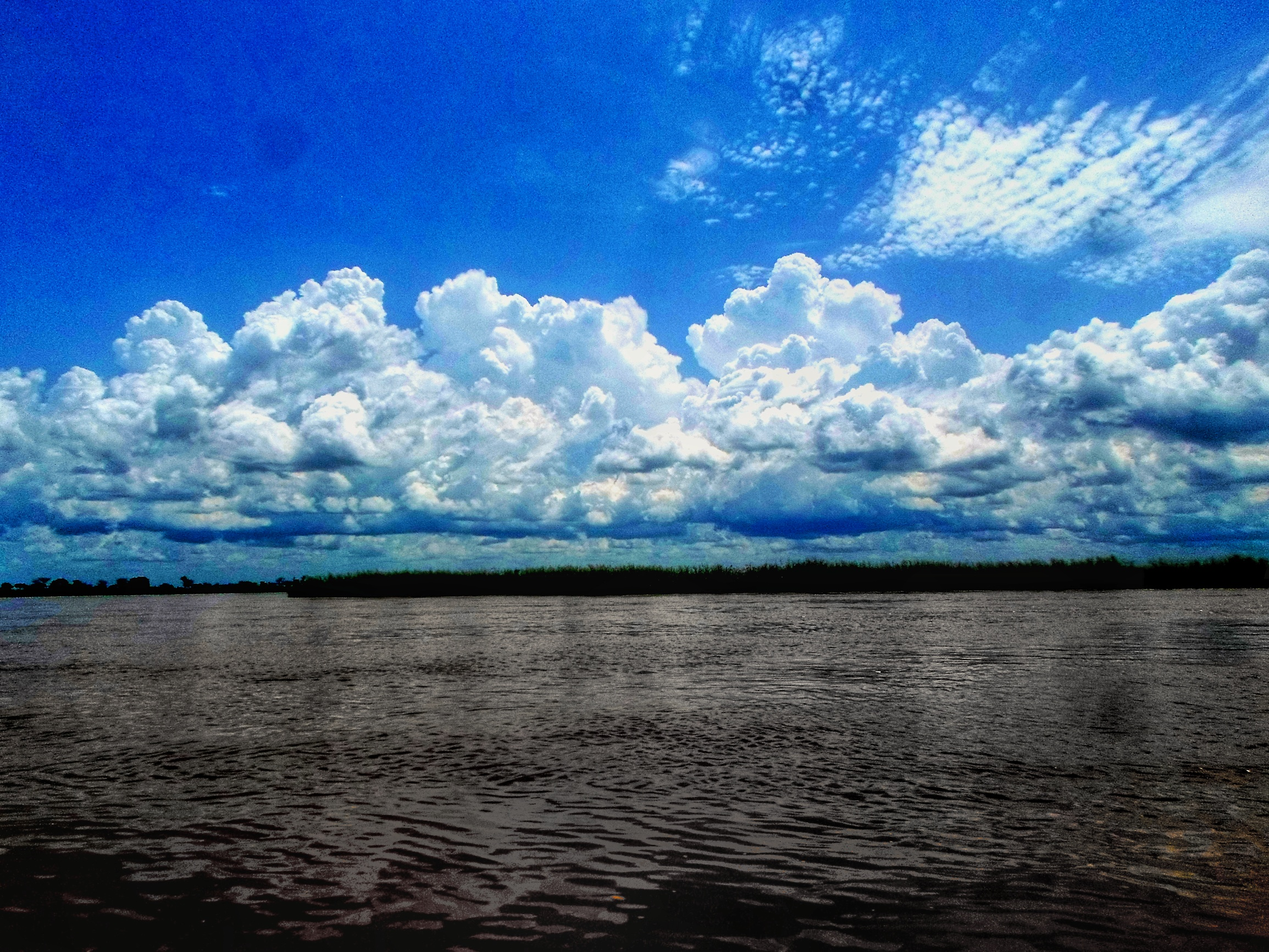
River Logone, Cameroon

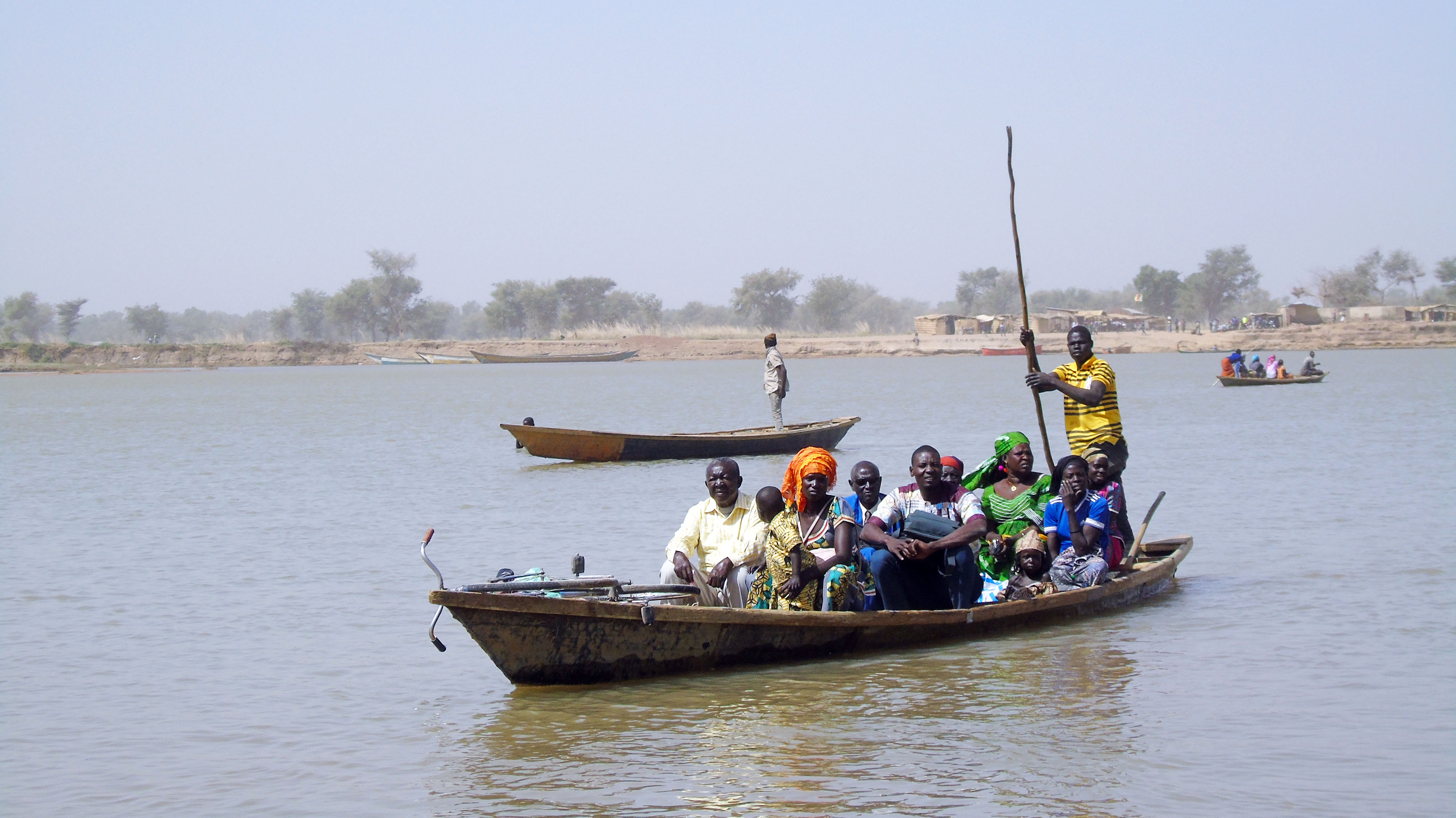
Logone on the border between Cameroon and Chad. January 2013.

=== September 2013 dam failure and flood ===
On the night of September 17 to September 18, 2013, heavy rains caused a rupture of the dam along the Logone River at the town of Dougui, Kai Kai District in the Far North Region of Cameroon. This caused initial evacuations of people to the banks of the dam. On September 27, a second rupture in the dam 4 km (2.5 mi) from the first rupture started flooding the area, and nearly 9,000 people were displaced.

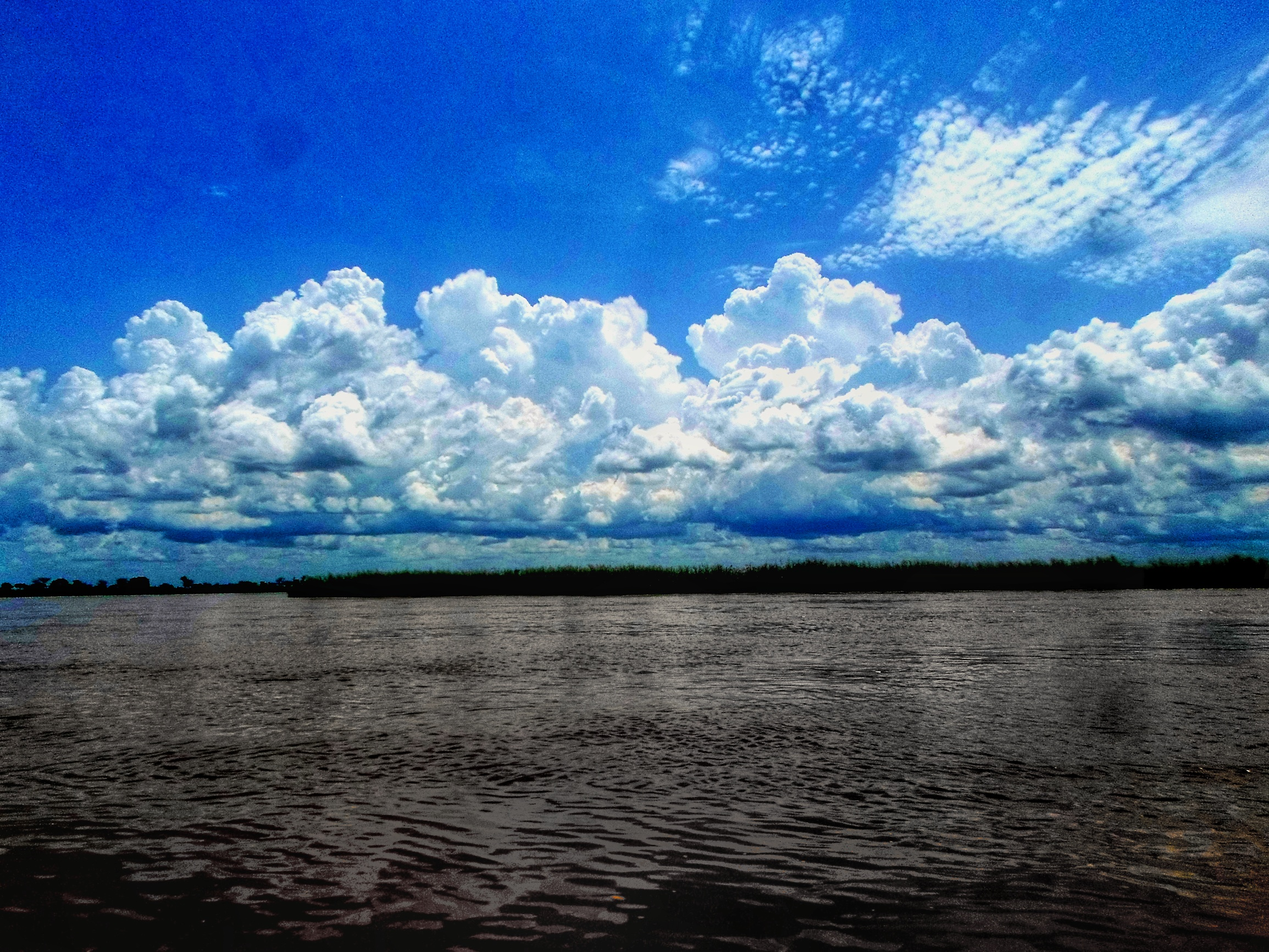
Logone River

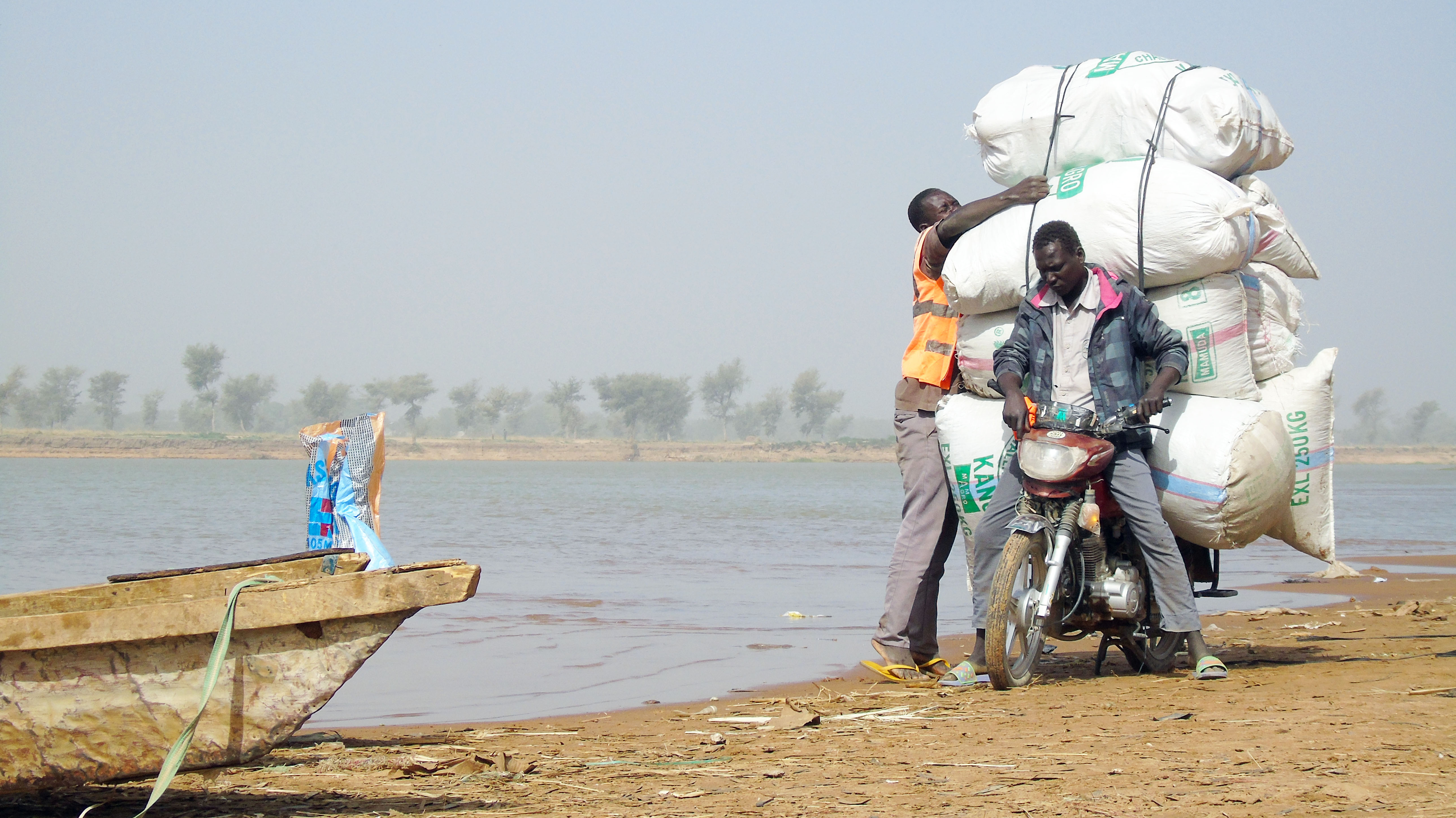
Mototaxi

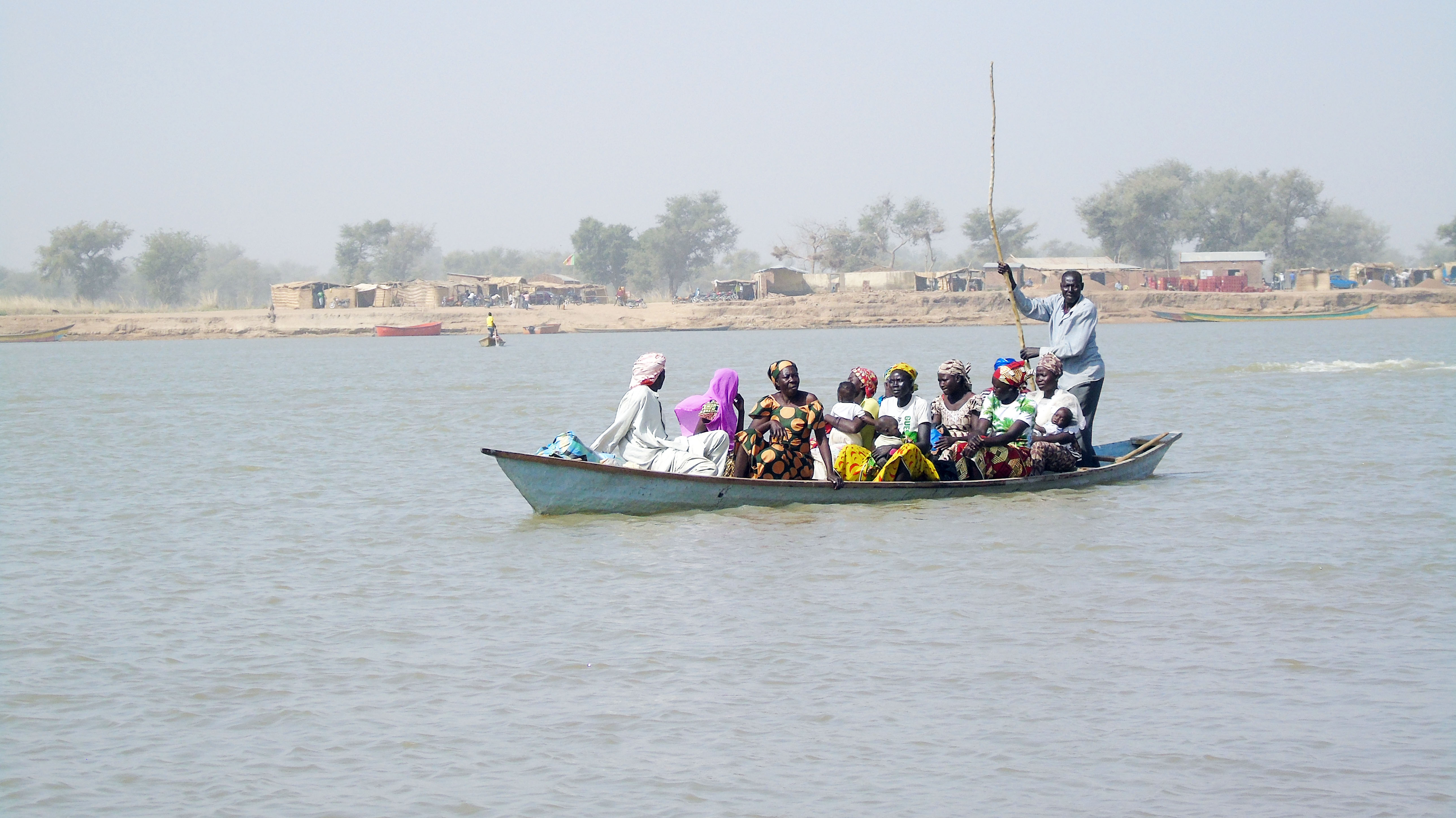
Canoe

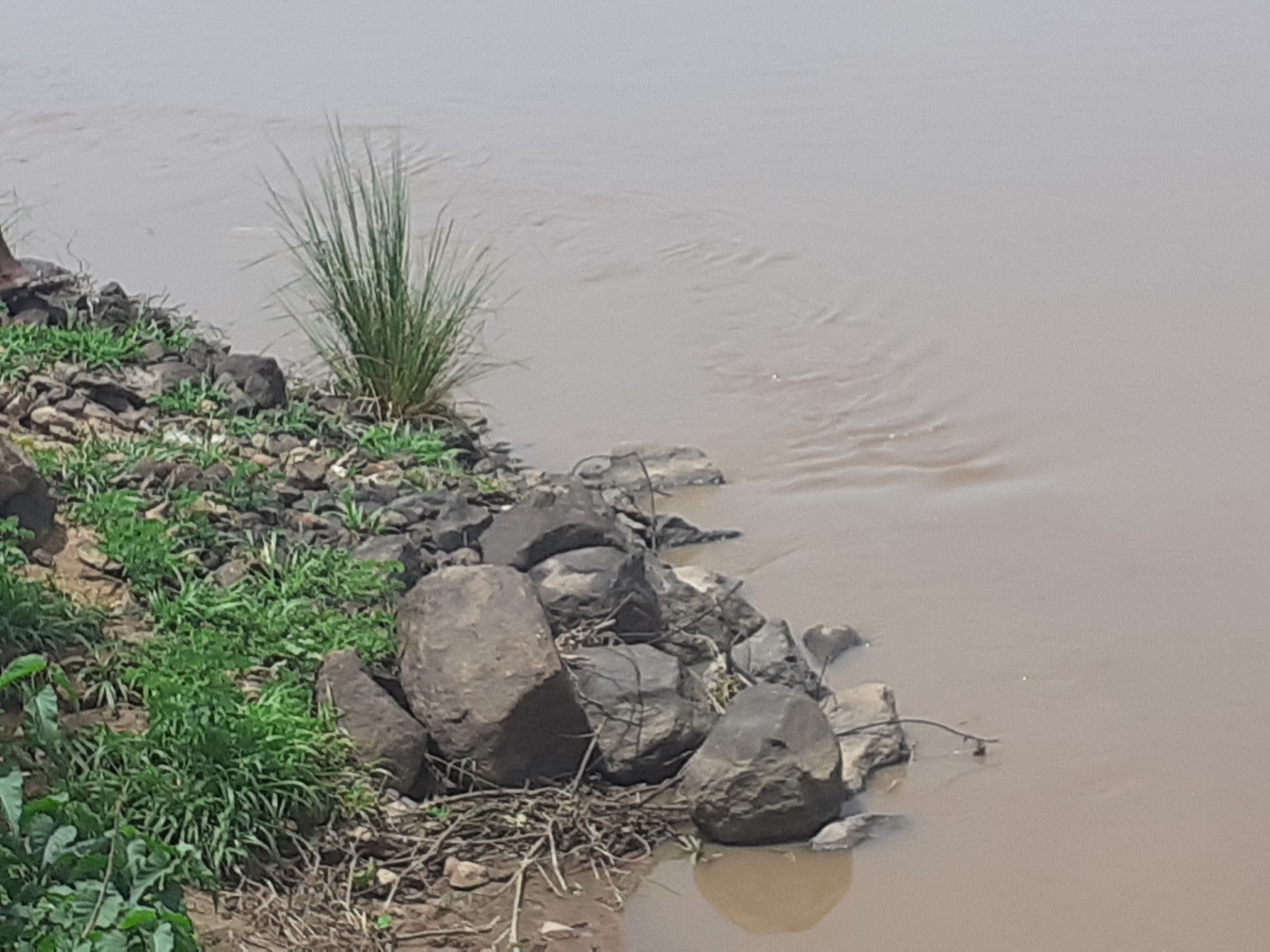
Stone block on the banks of the Zébé Marao Cameroon

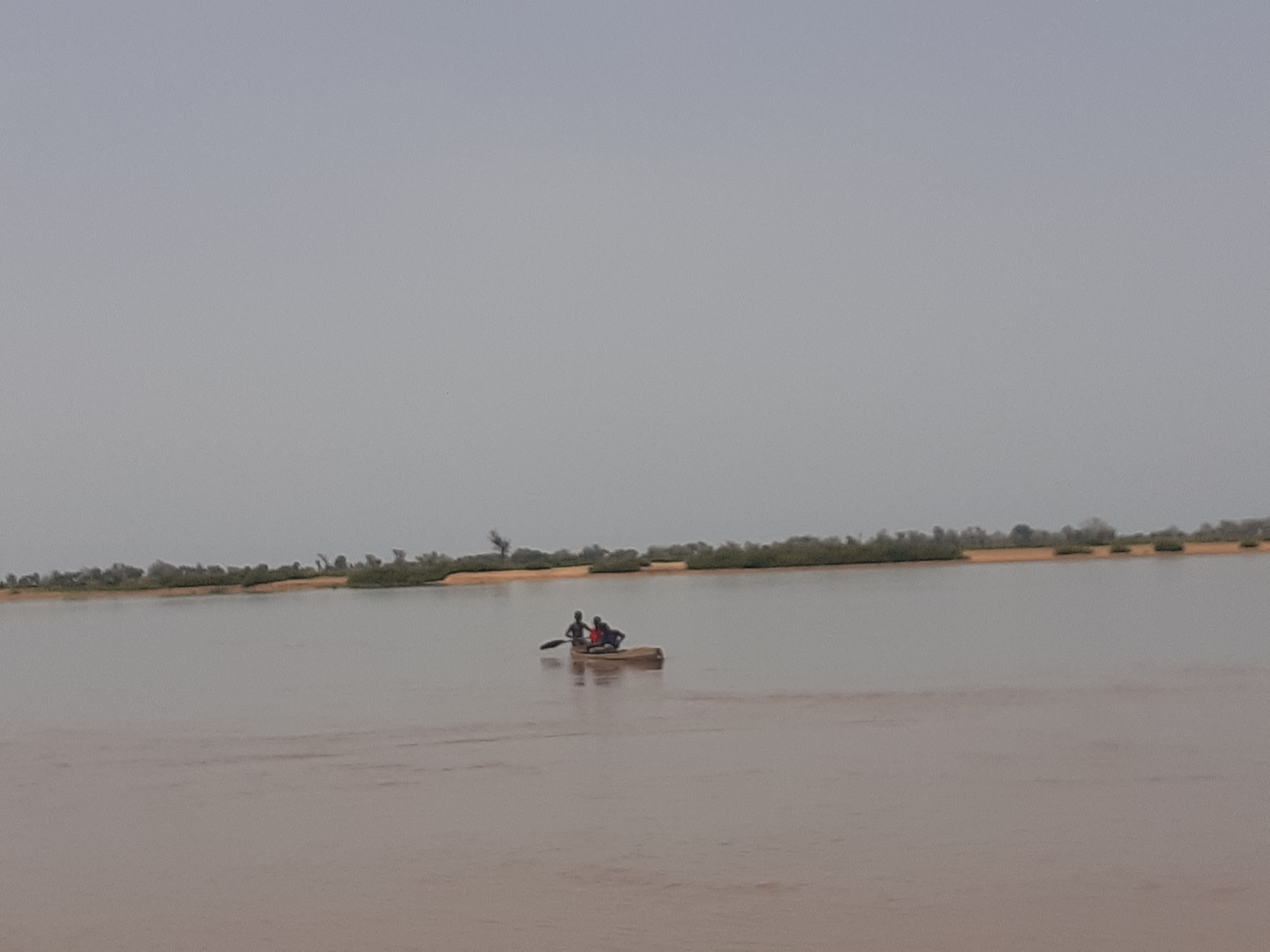
Piroge towards the shore opposite Zébé Marao Cameroon

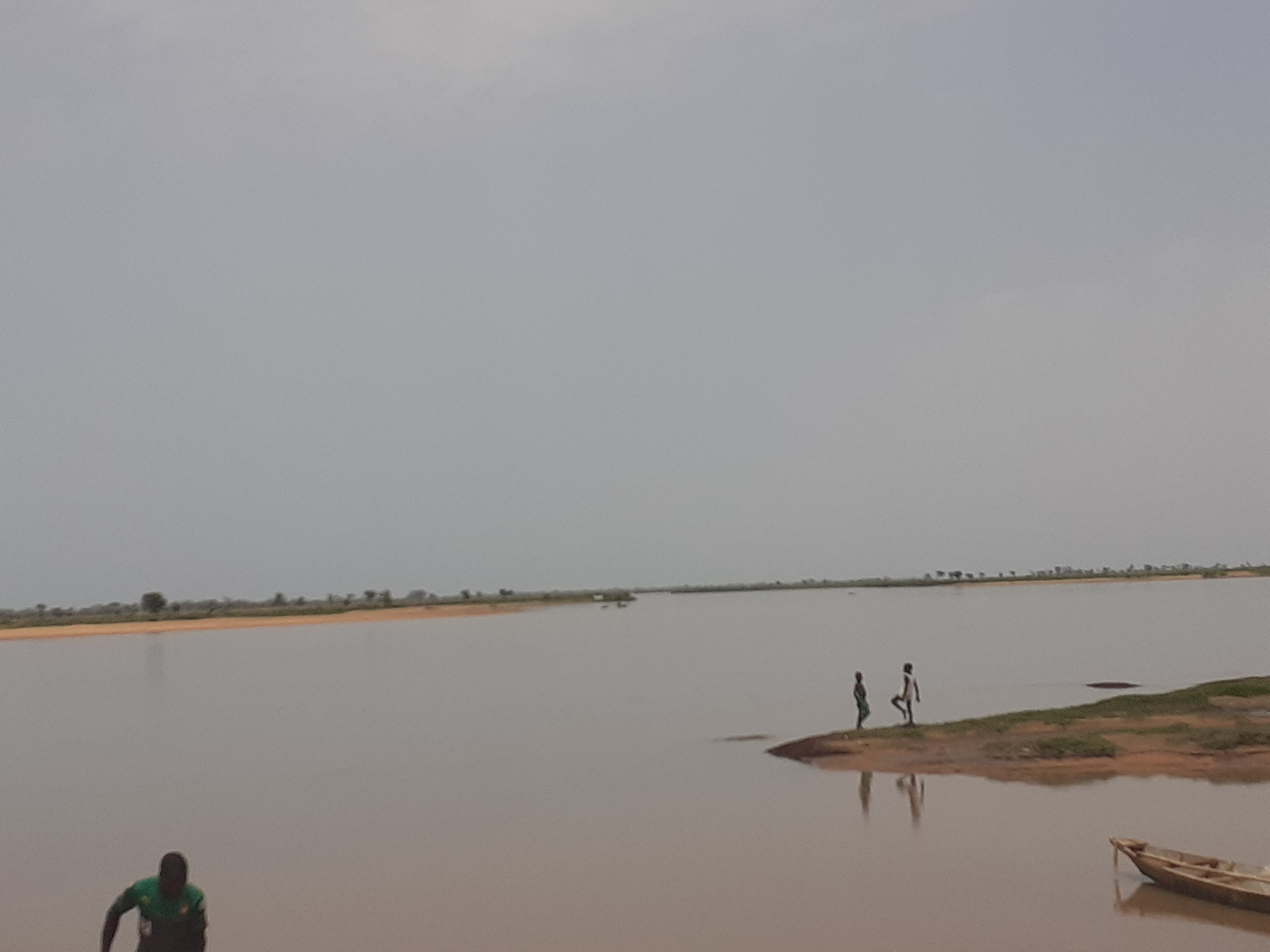
Fishing in Zébé Marao
