= Ober-Logone =

Ober-Logone was located in the Neukamerun administrative district of the German colony of Kamerun. In the modern day, its territory belongs mainly to the Republic of Chad.

The area was ceded from French Equatorial Africa to Cameroon (Neukamerun) following the Treaty of Fez. It comprised mainly the former French districts Pende, Moyen-Logone and Mao Kabi. A military occupation started in 1912 by the newly formed 12th Company of the protection force under Captain Bruno Raven. On 1 February 1913, the 12th company and its commander received management powers for the district, which originally was called Mao Kabbi. It was renamed Ober-Logone on 18 February 18, 1913.

== Sources ==
- Florian Hoffmann: Okkupation und Militärverwaltung in Kamerun. Etablierung und Institutionalisierung des kolonialen Gewaltmonopols, Teil I, Göttingen 2007, S. 345-347
