= Nana Barya River =

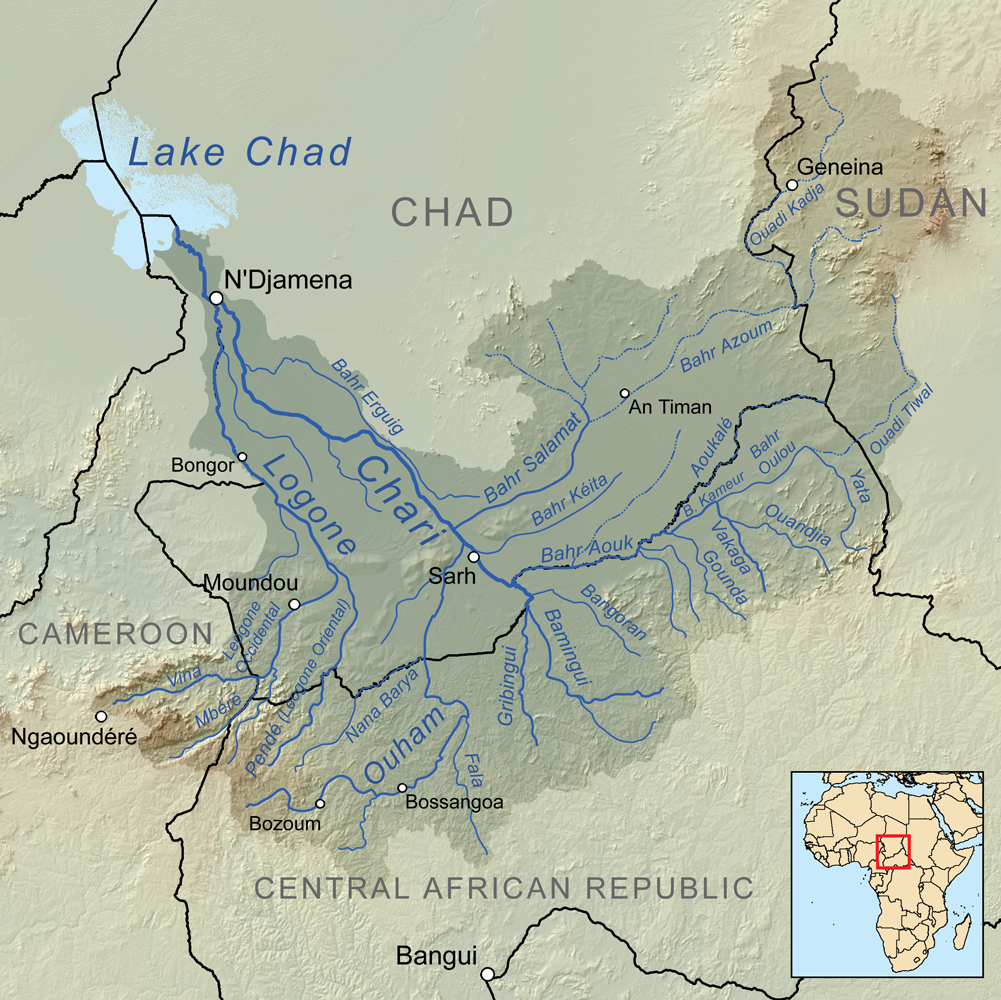
- Map showing the Chari with the Nana Barya (center left)

Location
- Countries: Chad; Central African Republic

Physical characteristics
- Source
  - location: Central African Republic
- Mouth
  - location: Ouham River on the Chad border
  - coordinates: 7°58′43″N 17°43′35″E
  - elevation: 387 m (1,270 ft)

The Nana Barya River is a river in Central Africa. It arises in the west of the Central African Republic in the prefecture Ouham-Pendé and flows northeast, forming part of the international boundary between the Central African Republic and Chad. In Chad it flows into the Ouham River. The Nana Barya Faunal Reserve, comprises a protected area surrounding the northern floodplain of the river.

== See also ==
- List of rivers of the Central African Republic
- Nana Barya Faunal Reserve
