= Ndji River =

River in the Central African Republic

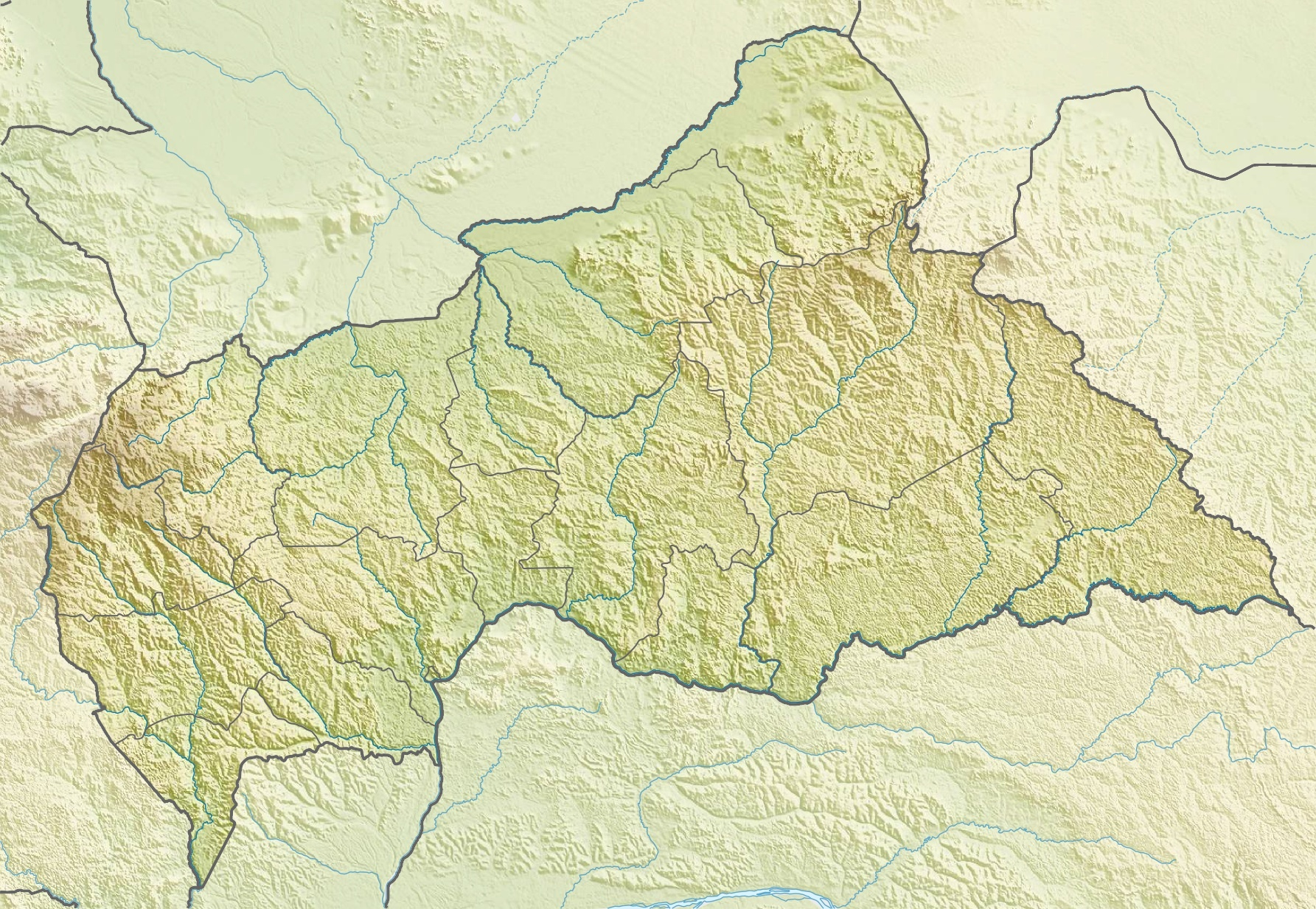
- Location within Central African Republic

Location
- Country: Central African Republic
- Prefecture: Haute-Kotto

Physical characteristics
- Source
  - coordinates: 7.333333°N 21.516667°E
- Mouth: Kotto River
  - location: Bria
  - coordinates: 6.796609°N 22.261974°E
- Length: 238 kilometres (148 mi)

The Ndji River, or Ndgii River, Dji River, Kpéo River, is a river of the Central African Republic. It is a left tributary of the Kotto River.

== Characteristics ==
The Ndji river is 238 kilometres (148 mi) long. It rises to the east of the Pata sandstone plateau and skirts the eastern escarpment before crossing it. Its source at 7°20′0″N 21°31′0″E is at an elevation of 725 metres (2,379 ft). It drops by 158 metres (518 ft) to its mouth on the Kotto at 6°48′0″N 22°16′0″E at an elevation of 567 metres (1,860 ft).

The Belgian explorer Léon Hanolet travelled up the valley of the Bali (Mbali) river and the upper Kotto River in 1894, following the road of the Arab caravans. His expedition reached Dabago at 6°58′0″N 23°10′0″E on the Ndji River. He described the country as flat, and sometimes walked for six hours without crossing a stream.

== Ecology ==
The river is home to the Syncerus caffer aequinoctialis subspecies of the African buffalo.

== Sources ==
- Boulvert, Y. (1987), Republique Centrafricaine Carte oro-hydrographique (PDF), ORSTOM
- Boulvert, Yves (2019), Explorations en Afrique Centrale 1790-1930 Apports des explorateurs à la connaissance du milieu (PDF)
- Smitz, Nathalie; Berthouly, Cécile; Cornélis, Daniel; Heller, Rasmus; Van Hooft, Pim; Chardonnet, Philippe; Caron, Alexandre; Prins, Herbert; Jansen van Vuuren, Bettine; De Iongh, Hans; Michaux, Johan (21 February 2013), "Pan-African Genetic Structure in the African Buffalo (Syncerus caffer): Investigating Intraspecific Divergence", PLOS ONE, 8 (2): e56235, doi:10.1371/journal.pone.0056235.g006, PMC 3578844, PMID 23437100
