= Kai-Kai =

Village in the Far North District, Cameroon

Coordinates: 10.8578°N 14.8297°E

- Commune and town
- Interactive map of Kai-Kai
- Country: Cameroon
- Time zone: UTC+1 (WAT)

Kai-Kai is a town and commune in Cameroon.

== 2013 dam failure and flood ==
On the night of 17-18 Sep 2013, heavy rains caused the rupture of the dam along the Logone River at the town of Dougui, Kai Kai District in the Far North Region of Cameroon. This caused initial evacuations of people to the banks of the dam. On 27 Sep, a second rupture in the dam 4 km from the first rupture started flooding the area and nearly 9,000 people were displaced.

== See also ==
- Communes of Cameroon
