= Chinko River =

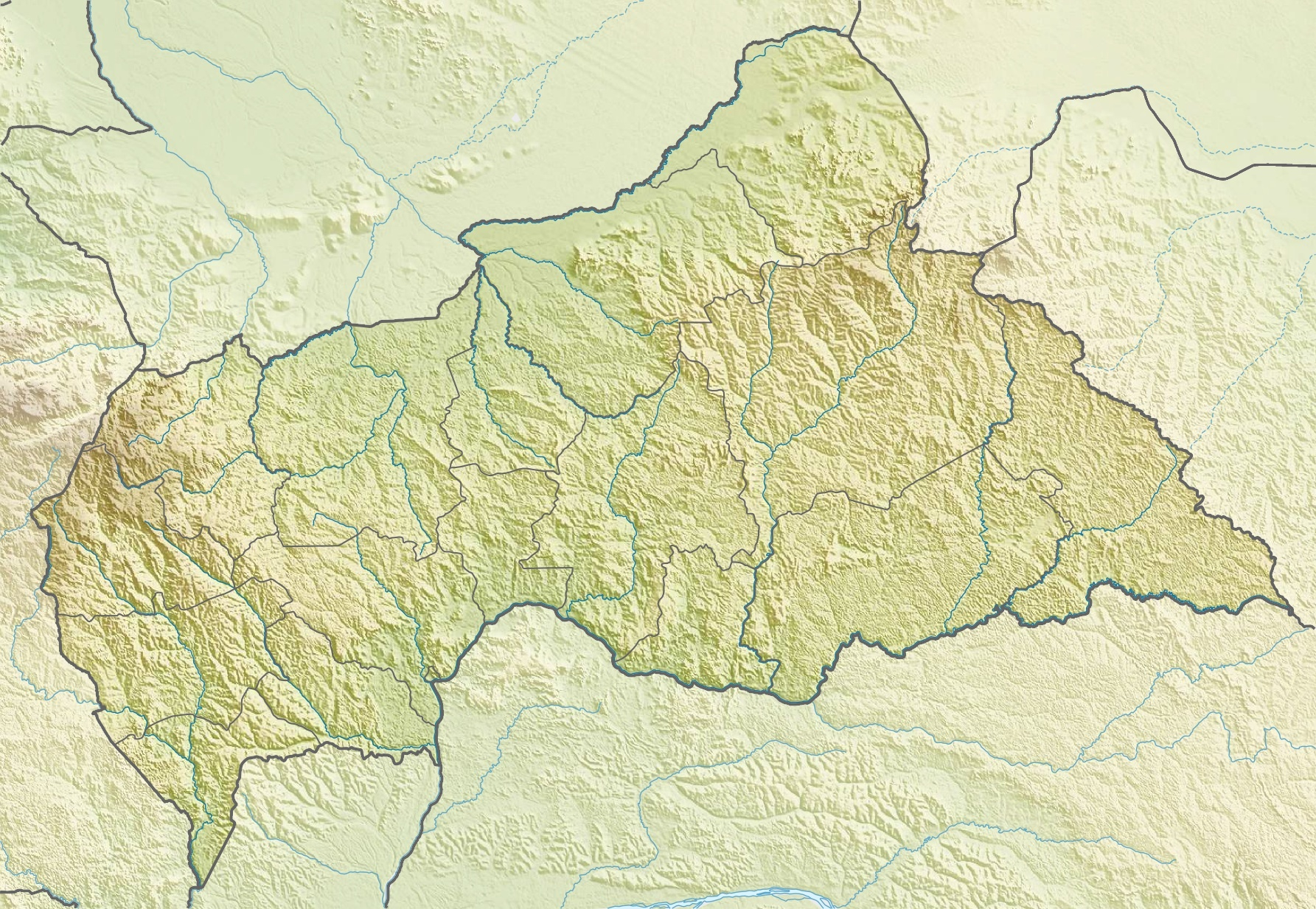
- Location within Central African Republic

Location
- Country: Central African Republic

Physical characteristics
- Mouth: Mbomou River
  - coordinates: 4.834715°N 23.886484°E
- Length: 420 kilometres (260 mi)
- Basin size: 52,308 square kilometres (20,196 sq mi)
- Discharge
  - average: 397 cubic metres per second (14,000 cu ft/s) at Rafai

Basin features
- River system: Congo Basin

The Chinko River (or Shinko River) is a river of the Central African Republic. It is a right tributary of the Mbomou River.

== Environment ==
The upper reaches of the Chinko river define the border between the Haute-Kotto and Haut-Mbomou prefectures. For most of its length it flows in a SSW direction through Mbomou prefecture to its convergence with the Mbomou River. The Mbomou plateau has an elevation of 500–700 metres (1,600–2,300 ft), slightly inclined to the south, on the Asande rise between the Lake Chad depression to the north and the Congo Basin to the south.

The Chinko Nature Reserve is a protected area in the Chinko River basin. It covers 17,600 square kilometres (6,800 sq mi). It is managed by the nonprofit conservation organization African Parks as part of a fifty-year public–private partnership with the Ministry of Water, Forest, Hunting and Fishing. African wild dogs have been documented in the south of the CAR in the Chinko/Mbari drainage basin in 2013.

== History ==
Around 1800 Kassanga, a Bandia leader, founded a kingdom in the Shinko valley, later called the Rafai kingdom. Kassanga was the great-grandfather of Sultan Rafai. The Belgian officer Charles Kéthule de Ryove (1865–1903) was assigned to the Upper Uele expedition in August 1891. In March 1892 he explored the region between the Mbomou and Shinko rivers. He met Sultan Rafai, who declared his allegiance to the Congo Free State. Kéthule de Ryove was resident at Rafai's court from 1892 to 1894. He wrote in an 1895 article Le sultanat de Rafaï (Le Congo illustré) that almost all the inhabitants could speak Arabic, including the sultan, chiefs and soldiers. In 1894 the Belgian Léon Hanolet ascended the Mbari River, another tributary of the Bomu, while Théodore Nilis ascended the Chinko River.

== Sources ==
- "African Parks takes over management of protected area in Central African Republic", Africa Geographic, 12 December 2014, archived from the original on 2015-04-01
- Bradshaw, Richard; Fandos-Rius, Juan (27 May 2016), Historical Dictionary of the Central African Republic, Rowman & Littlefield Publishers, ISBN 978-0-8108-7992-8
- Ergo, André-Bernard (2013), "Les postes fortifiés de la frontière Nord de l'État Indépendant du Congo", Histoire du Congo (PDF), archived from the original (PDF) on 2022-05-25
- Hickisch, R.; Aebischer, T. (2013), "Evidence of African wild dogs in the Central African Republic" (PDF), Canid Biology and Conservation, 16 (3): 8–11
- Luffin, Xavier (2004), "The Use Of Arabic As A Written Language In Central Africa The Case Of The Uele Basin (Northern Congo) In The Late Nineteenth Century" (PDF), Sudanic Africa, 15: 145–177, archived from the original (PDF) on April 18, 2016
- "Relation: Chinko (3249708)", OpenStreetMap
- Runge, Juergen (15 November 2013), New Studies on Former and Recent Landscape Changes in Africa: Palaeoecology of Africa 32, CRC Press, ISBN 978-1-138-00116-9
- Woods, Elliott D. (Summer 2016), "The Fight for Chinko", Virginia Quarterly Review, University of Virginia, archived from the original on 2017-08-08
