= Kotto River =

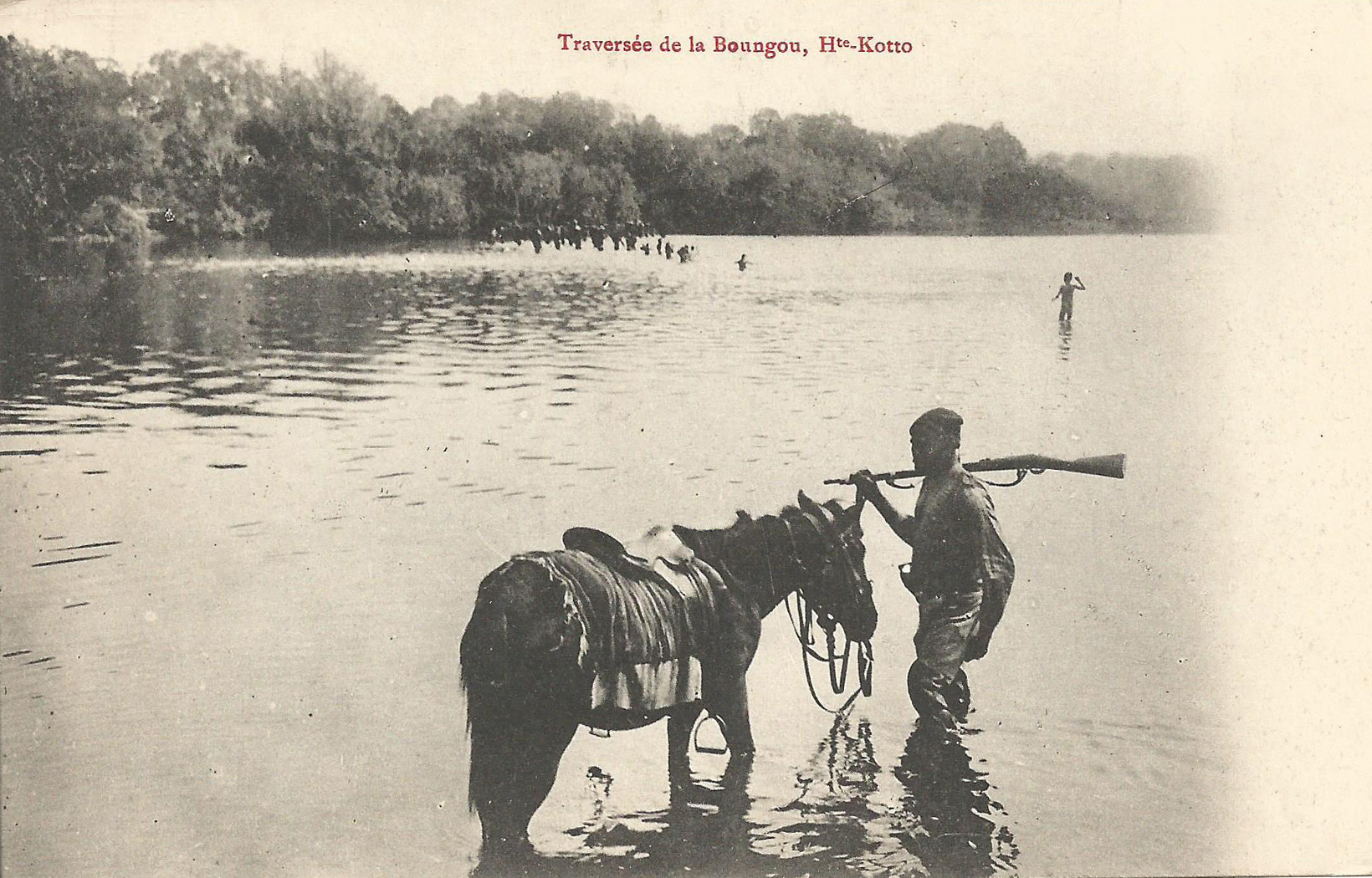

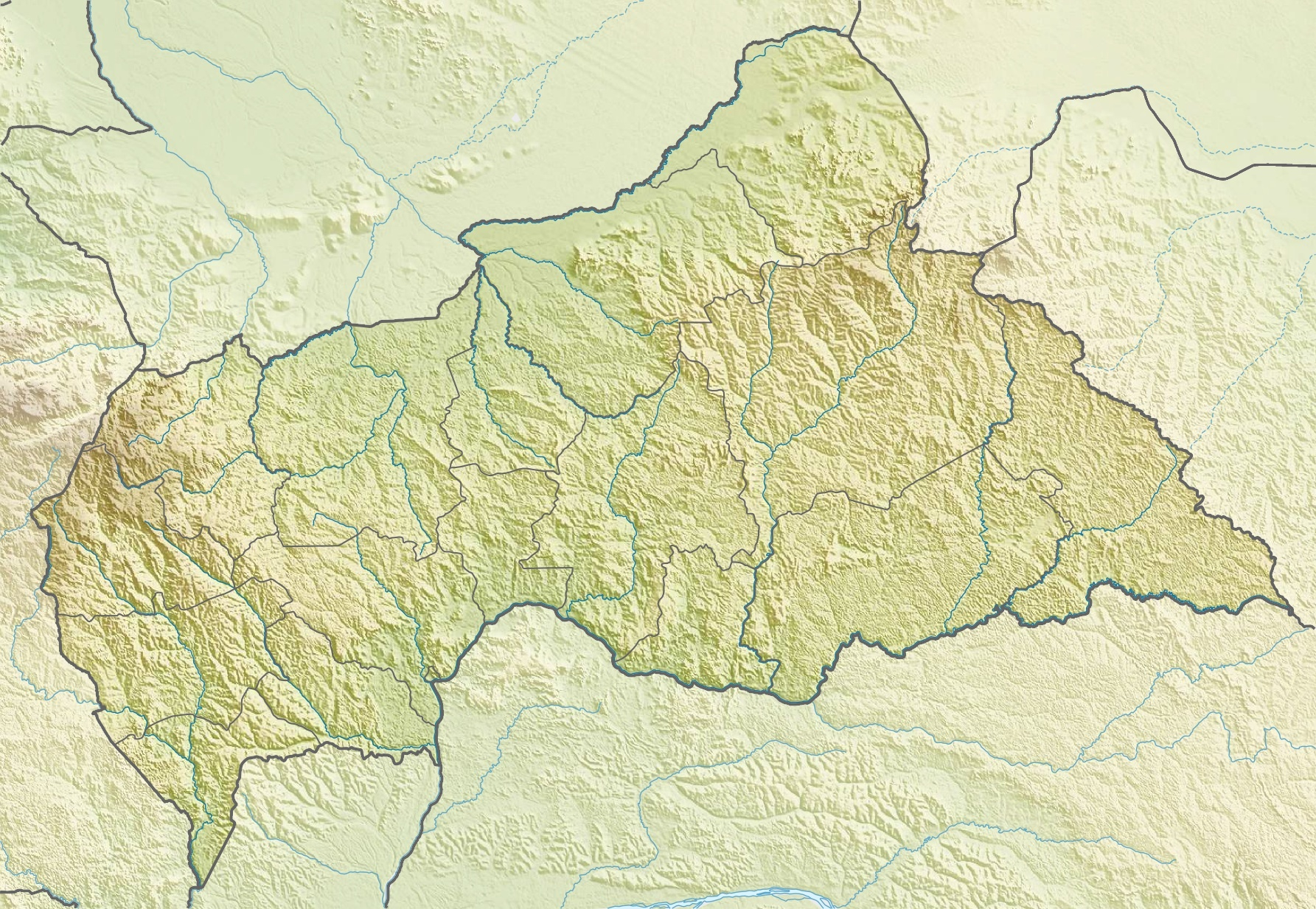
- Location within Central African Republic

Location
- Country: Central African Republic
- Prefecture: Haute-Kotto, Basse-Kotto

Physical characteristics
- Source: Mount Toussoro, Bongo Massif
- Mouth: Ubangi River
  - location: near Mobaye
  - coordinates: 4.2314°N 22.0378°E
- Length: 882 km (548 mi)
- Basin size: 78400 km^{2}
- Discharge
  - location: Kembe
  - average: 447 m^{3}/s
  - minimum: 77 m^{3}/s
  - maximum: 1460 m^{3}/s

Basin features
- Progression: Ubangi River→ Congo River→ Atlantic Ocean
- River system: Congo River
- Tributaries
  - left: Kawadjia, Pipi, Ndji, Boungou

The Kotto River (or Koto River) is a tributary of the Oubangui River in the Central African Republic.

Its source is on the south side of the Bongo Massif, near Mount Toussoro on the border between the Central African Republic and Sudan. It flows generally north-east to south-west for 640 km (400 mi) past Bria, joining the Ubangi River 100 km (60 mi) east of Mobaye. The river separates the Tondou Massif from the Mongos chain to the north. There are several rapids along its course.

The Kotto River gives its name to two of the Central African Republic's sixteen prefectures, Haute-Kotto and Basse-Kotto.

Historical views

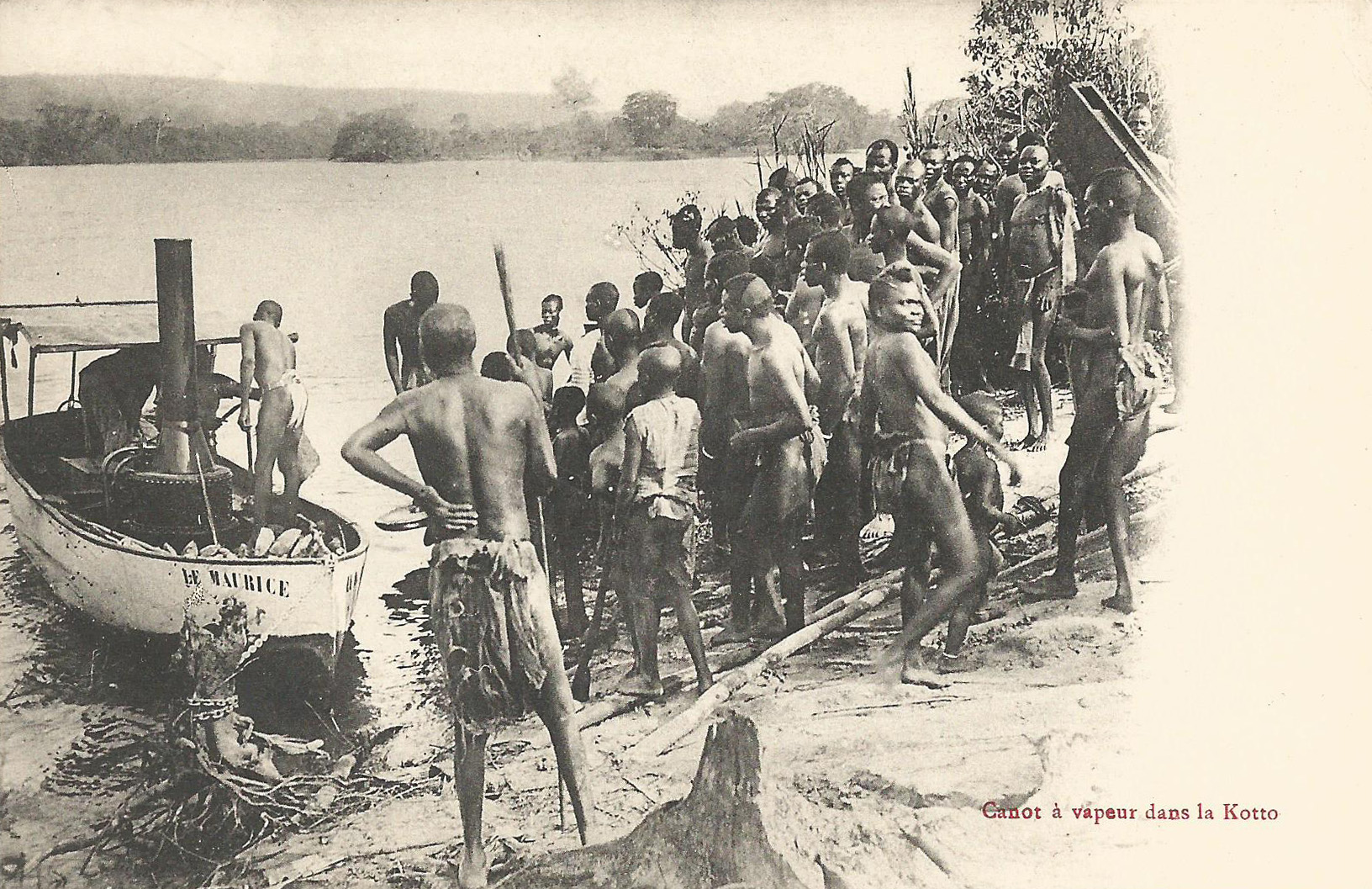
Steamboat on the Kotto.

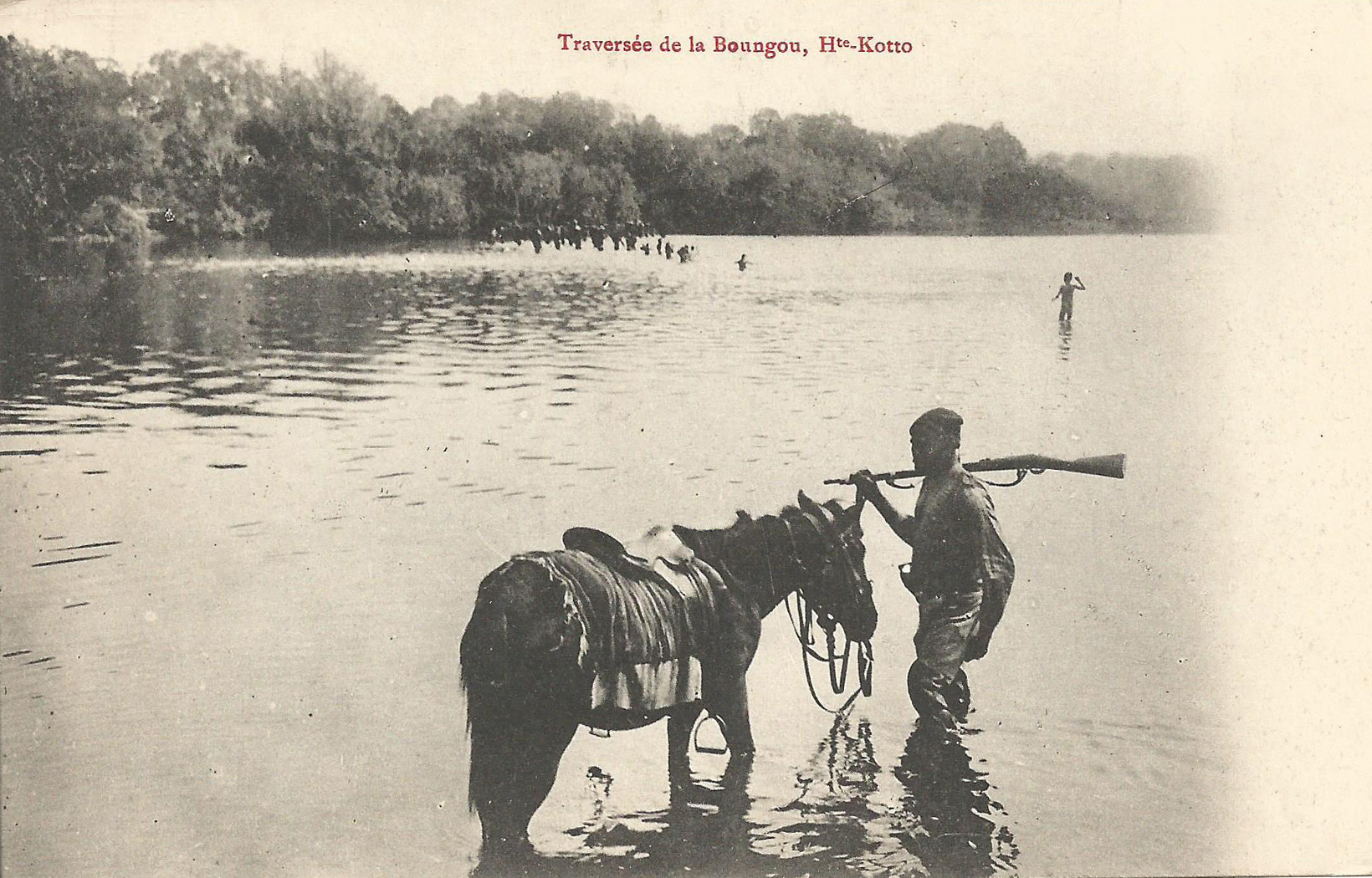
Crossing of the Boungou, a right tributary.
