= Ouham River =

River in Central Africa

Ouham River Bahr Sarh; Bahr Sara
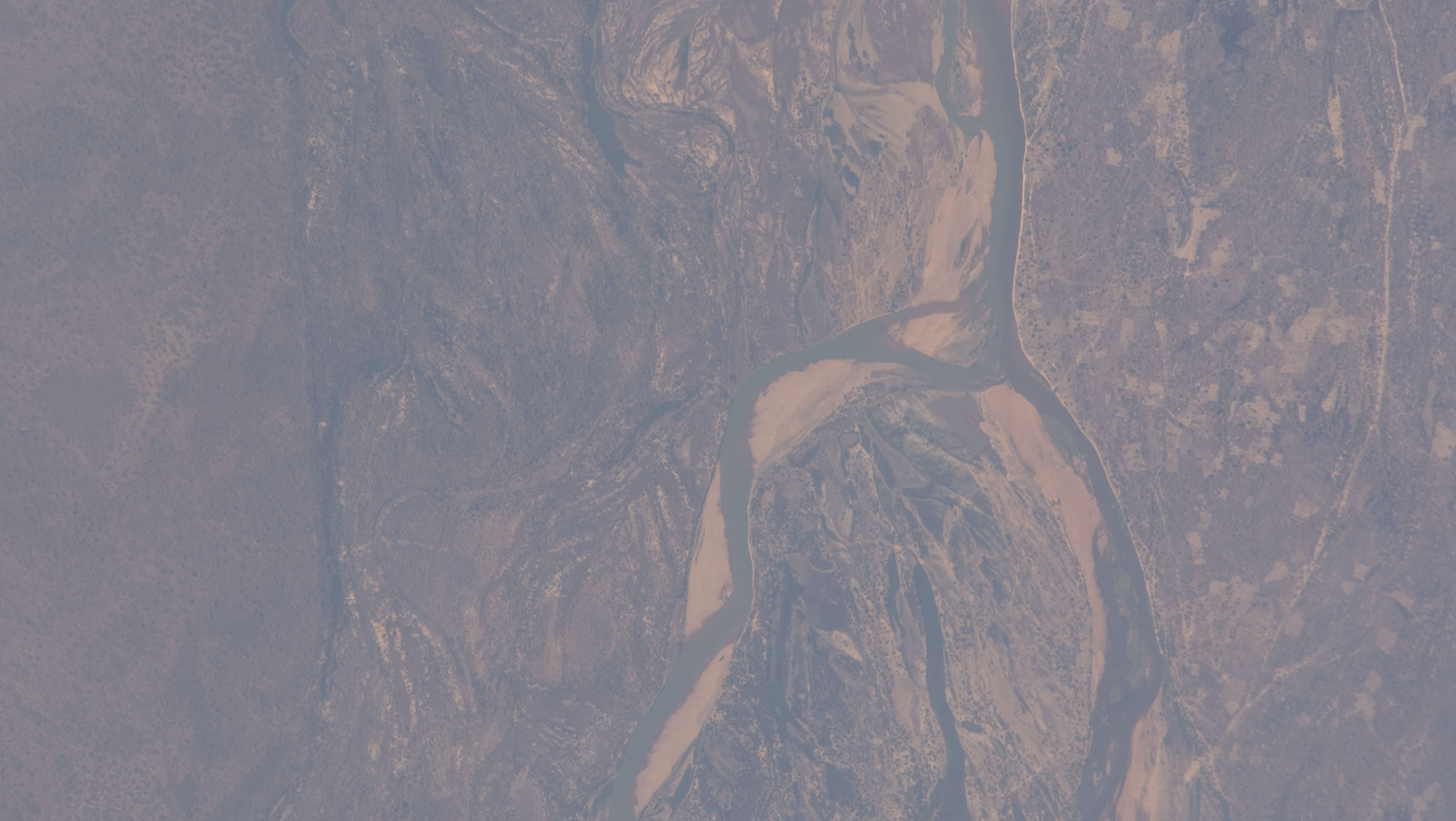

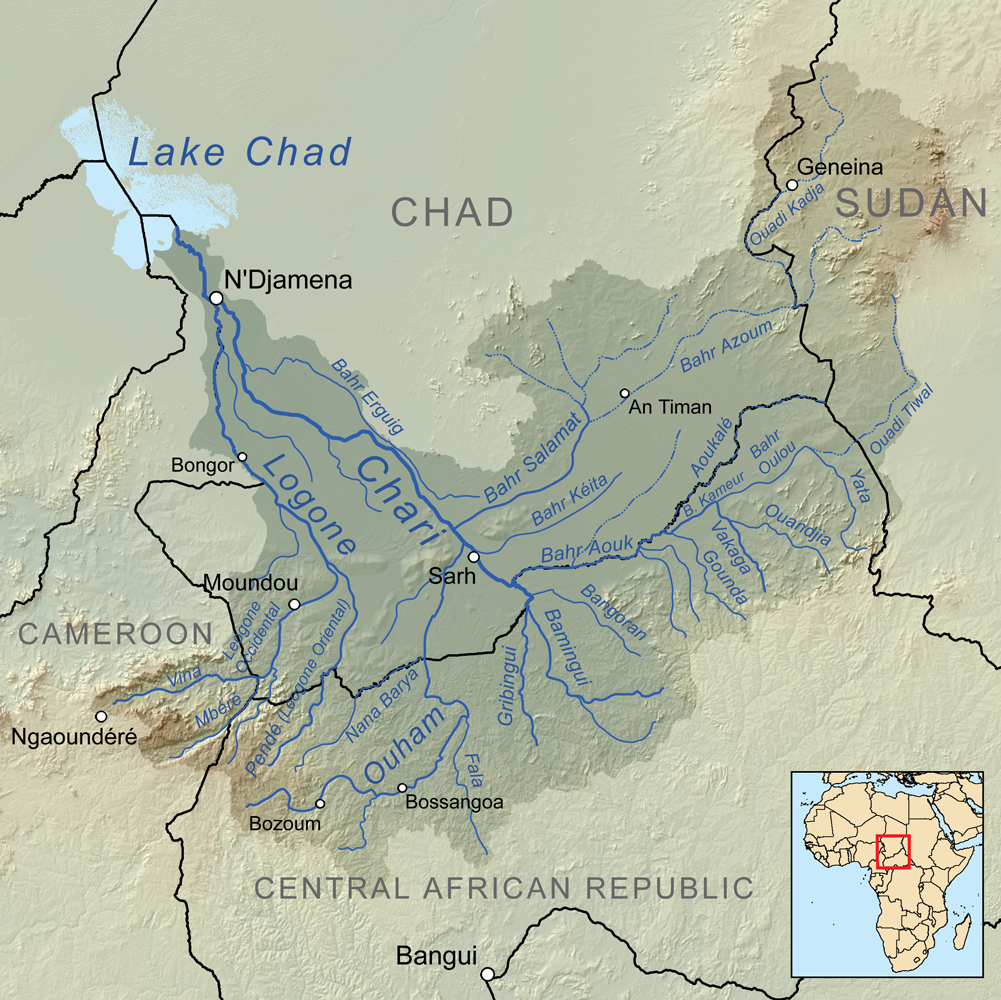
- Map showing the Chari with the Ouham (Bottom center)

Location
- Countries: Chad; Central African Republic
- Cities: Bossangoa; Bozoum

Physical characteristics
- Source
  - location: Central African Republic
  - coordinates: 6°11′N 15°14′E
  - elevation: 1,139 m (3,737 ft)
- Mouth
  - location: Chari River north from Sarh, Chad
  - coordinates: 9°18′59″N 18°13′35″E
  - elevation: 364 m (1,194 ft)
- Length: 676 km (420 mi)
- Basin size: 70,000 km^{2} (27,000 sq mi)
- Discharge
  - average: 480 m^{3}/s (17,000 cu ft/s)

Basin features
- Tributaries
  - left: Nana Barya
  - right: Fafa

The Ouham River is a river in Central Africa, and one of the main headwaters of the Chari River. The Ouham originates in the Central African Republic between the Nana-Mambéré and Ouham-Pendé prefectures, crossing into Chad where it joins the Chari about 25 km north of Sarh. Tributaries are the Baba, Fafa, Nana Bakassa, and the Nana Barya.

== Hydrometry ==
The flow of the river has been observed over 33 years (1951–84) in Moïssala a town in Chad about 150 km above the mouth of the Chari. At Moïssala, the observed average annual flow during this period was 480 m³ / s fed by an area of about 67,600 km ^{2} approximately 95% of the total catchment area of the River.

The average monthly flow of the river Sara at hydrological station of Moïssala (in m³ / s ) (Calculated using the data for a period of 33 years, 1951–84)

== See also ==
- Lake Chad replenishment project
- Waterway
