= Mbari River =

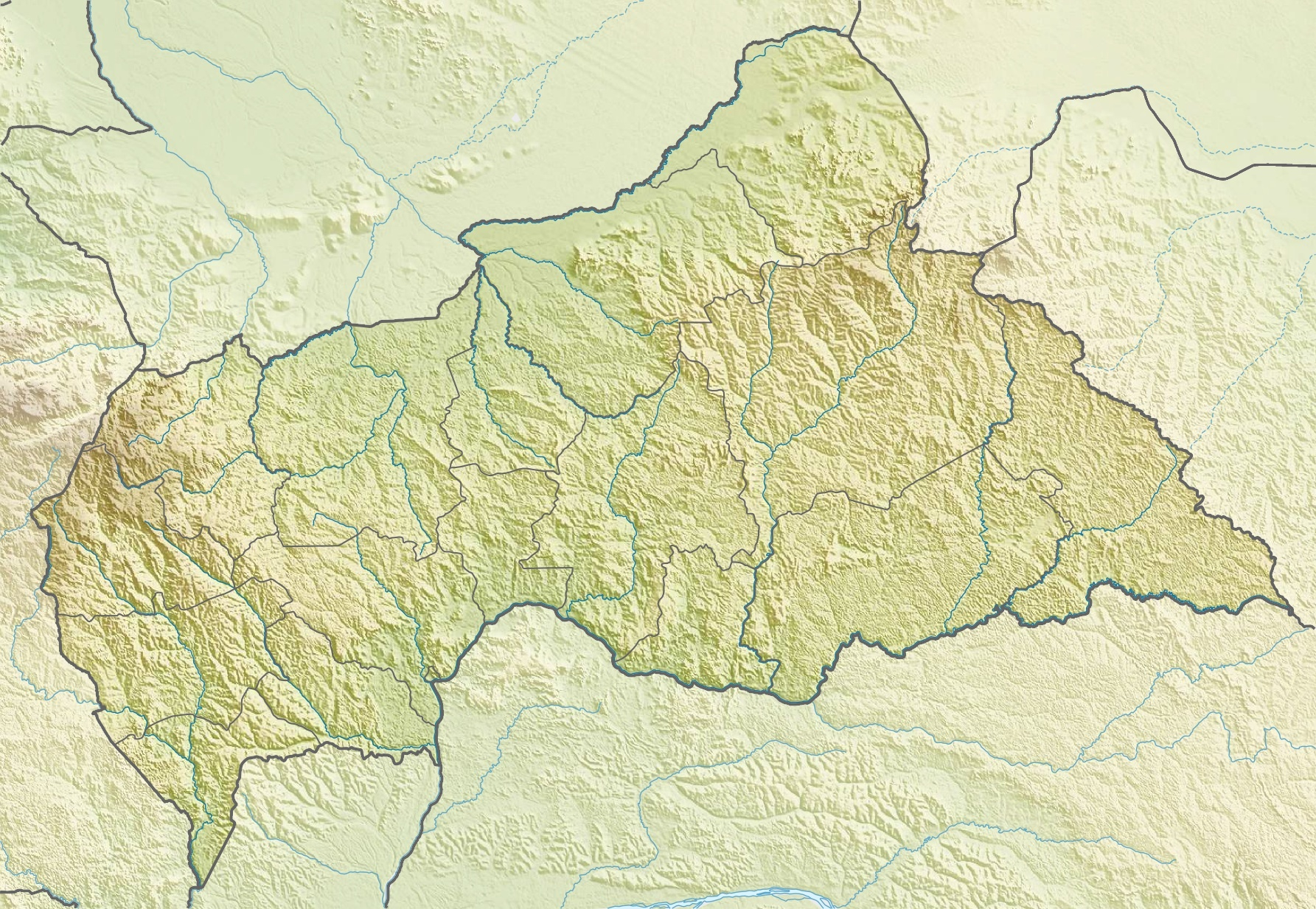
- Location within Central African Republic

Location
- Country: Central African Republic

Physical characteristics
- Mouth: Mbomou River
  - coordinates: 4.574672°N 22.727885°E
- Length: 450 kilometres (280 mi)
- Basin size: 23,600 square kilometres (9,100 sq mi)

The Mbari River is a river of the Central African Republic. It is a right tributary of the Mbomou River not far to the north of where the Mbomou joins the Uele River to form the Ubangi River.

== Environment ==
The Mbari River is the main drainage axis of the Mbomou plateau. It is about 450 kilometres (280 mi) long, running in a NE-SW direction through a 2–3 kilometres (1.2–1.9 mi) wide alluvial plain. It drains a catchment area of 23,600 square kilometres (9,100 sq mi). The plateau has an elevation of 500–700 metres (1,600–2,300 ft), slightly inclined to the south, on the Asande rise between the Lake Chad depression to the north and the Congo Basin to the south. A study published in 2002 found signs that forest plants were replacing savanna vegetation in the Mbari valley, in part due to sufficient annual rainfall, reduced frequency of bush fires and migration of rural people away from the region due to the economic crisis in Central Africa.

African wild dogs have been documented in the south of the CAR in the Chinko/Mbari drainage basin in 2013.

== History ==
The Bandia clan separated from the Abaza clan in the early 17th century. They controlled a large area between the Uele River and the Mbomou River. In the last quarter of the 18th century one of their leaders, Ndounga, founded what became the Bangassou kingdom over the Nzakara people on the Mbari river. His brother Kassanga founded what became the Rafai kingdom on the Chinko River. These kingdoms prospered during the 19th century by participating in the growing slave trade, and thus avoiding raids by slave traders.

In the 1880s the chief Bangassou, whom the Belgians called Sultan Bangassou, began to obtain rifles from agents of the Congo Free State, and used these to expand his power. In January he moved his headquarters to where the Mbari enters the Bangassou. (Note: The modern town of Bangassou is on the right bank of the Bangassou above the confluence of the Mbari. It is possible that the mouth of the Mbari has moved since the town was established.) The Belgian Alphonse van Gèle founded the Yakoma post on the Ubangi River on 31 May 1890. Bangassou visited him there on 14 June 1890 and signed a treaty placing his Nzakara kingdom under the protection of the Congo Free State in order to obtain trade goods, weapons and military support from the Europeans. He sold huge quantities of ivory to agents of the Congo Free State. In 1894 the Belgian Léon Hanolet ascended the Bari River while Théodore Nilis and Charles de la Kethulle ascended the Chinko River, another tributary of the Bomu.

== Sources ==
- Bradshaw, Richard; Fandos-Rius, Juan (27 May 2016), Historical Dictionary of the Central African Republic, Rowman & Littlefield Publishers, ISBN 978-0-8108-7992-8
- Ergo, André-Bernard (2013), "Les postes fortifiés de la frontière Nord de l'État Indépendant du Congo", Histoire du Congo (PDF), archived from the original (PDF) on 2022-05-25
- Hickisch, R.; Aebischer, T. (2013), "Evidence of African wild dogs in the Central African Republic" (PDF), Canid Biology and Conservation, 16 (3): 8–11
- "Relation: Mbari", OpenStreetMap
- Runge, Juergen (2002), "Holocene landscape history and palaeohydrology evidenced by stable carbon isotope (δ13C) analysis of alluvial sediments in the Mbari valley (5°N/23°E), Central African Republic", CATENA, 48: 67–87, doi:10.1016/S0341-8162(02)00010-3
- Runge, Juergen (15 November 2013), New Studies on Former and Recent Landscape Changes in Africa: Palaeoecology of Africa 32, CRC Press, ISBN 978-1-138-00116-9
