= Pendé River =

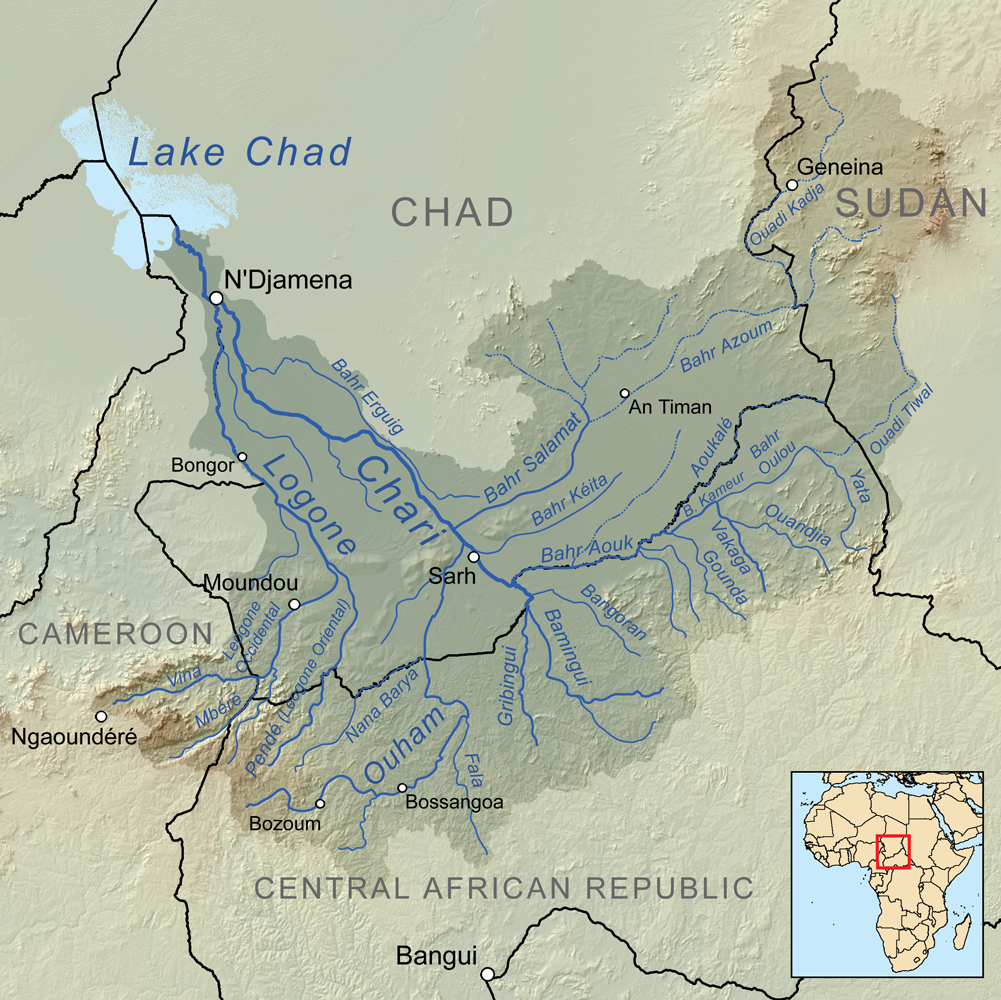
- Map showing the Pendé River (Center left) within the Chari River drainage basin
- Native name: Rivière Pendé (French)

Location
- Countries: Chad; Central African Republic

Physical characteristics
- Source
  - location: Central African Republic
- Mouth
  - location: Logone River at Kim, Chad
  - coordinates: 9°5′20″N 16°27′55″E
  - elevation: 375 m (1,230 ft)
- Basin size: 15,325 km^{2} (5,917 sq mi)
- Discharge
  - average: 128 m^{3}/s (4,500 cu ft/s)

The Pendé River (French: Rivière Pendé) is a river in central Africa. It arises in Ouham-Pendé in the Central African Republic and flows north, forming a short part of the international boundary between the Central African Republic and Chad. It eventually merges with the Logone River near Kim.

Historically it gave its name to the French administrative district Pendé, which was ceded to Germany as part of Neukamerun at the treaty of Fez 1912.

== Hydrometry ==
The flow of the river observed over 28 years (1947–75) in Doba, a town in Chad about 70 km above the mouth into the Logon, observed average annual flow at 128 m³ / s fed by an area of about 14.300 km ², a majority of the total catchment area of the river.

The average monthly flow of the river Pendé hydrological station of Doba (in m³ / s )

(Calculated using the data for a period of 28 years, 1947–75)
