= Anatole Collinet Makosso's government =

Government of the Republic of the Congo since 2021

Collinet Makosso government
- Cabinet of the Republic of the Congo
- 2021–present
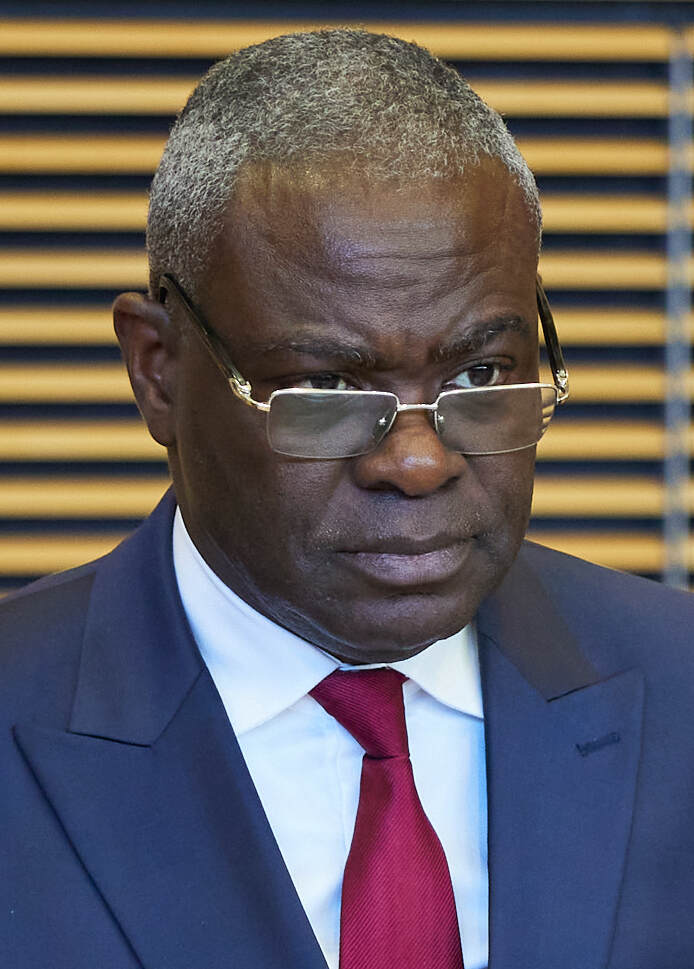
- Prime Minister Anatole Collinet Makosso in 2022
- Date formed: 15 May 2021

People and organisations
- President: Denis Sassou Nguesso
- Prime Minister: Anatole Collinet Makosso
- Member parties: PCT; MAR; Club 2002; RPDS
- Status in legislature: Supermajority
- Opposition parties: UPADS; UDH-Yuki; MUST; MCDDI

History
- Election: 2022 parliamentary election
- Legislature terms: 14th National Assembly; 15th National Assembly
- Predecessor: Second Mouamba government

Anatole Collinet Makosso's government has governed the Republic of the Congo since 15 May 2021.

== Cabinet ministers ==
Cabinet members
Portfolio	Minister	Took office	Left office	Party
Prime Minister	Anatole Collinet Makosso	15 May 2021	Incumbent	PCT
Minister of National Defense	Charles Richard Mondjo	15 May 2021	Incumbent	Independent
Minister of the Interior, Decentralization and Local Development	Raymond Mboulou	15 May 2021	Incumbent	PCT
Minister of Foreign Affairs, Francophonie and Congolese Abroad	Jean-Claude Gakosso	15 May 2021	Incumbent	PCT
Minister of Agriculture, Livestock and Fisheries	Paul Valentin Ngobo	15 May 2021	Incumbent	Independent
Minister of Finance, Budget and Public Portfolio	Rigobert Roger Andely	15 May 2021	24 September 2022	PCT
Minister of Finance, Budget and Public Portfolio	Jean-Baptiste Ondaye	24 September 2022	Incumbent	Independent
Minister of Hydrocarbons	Bruno Itoua	15 May 2021	Incumbent	PCT
Minister of Communication and Media Government Spokesperson	Thierry Moungalla	15 May 2021	Incumbent	Independent
Minister of Special Economic Zones and Economic Diversification	Emile Ouosso	15 May 2021	24 September 2022	PCT
Minister of Special Economic Zones and Economic Diversification	Jean-Marc Thystère Tchicaya	27 September 2022	Incumbent	RDPS
Minister of Transport, Civil Aviation and Merchant Navy	Jean-Marc Thystère Tchicaya	15 May 2021	24 September 2022	RDPS
Minister of Transport, Civil Aviation and Merchant Navy	Honoré Sayi	24 September 2022	Incumbent	UPADS
Minister of Justice, Human Rights and Promotion of Indigenous Peoples	Aimé Ange Wilfrid Bininga	15 May 2021	Incumbent	PCT
Minister of Economy, Statistics Plan and Regional Integration	Ingrid Ebouka-Babackas	15 May 2021	Incumbent	PCT
Minister of Construction, Urban Planning and Housing	Joshua Rodrigue Ngouonimba	15 May 2021	Incumbent	PCT
Minister of the Environment, Sustainable Development and the Congo Basin	Arlette Soudan-Nonault	15 May 2021	Incumbent	PCT
Minister of Forest Economy	Rosalie Matondo	15 May 2021	Incumbent	Independent
Minister of Health and Population	Gilbert Mokoki	15 May 2021	Incumbent	PCT
Minister for International Cooperation and the Promotion of Public-Private Partnership	Denis Christel Sassou Nguesso	15 May 2021	Incumbent	PCT
Minister of Energy and Hydraulics	Honoré Sayi	15 May 2021	24 September 2022	PCT
Minister of Energy and Hydraulics	Émile Ouosso	27 September 2022	Incumbent	PCT
Minister of Youth and Sports and Civic Education, Skills Training and Employment	Hugues Ngouelondele	15 May 2021	Incumbent	PCT
Minister for Industrial Cooperation and the Promotion of the Private Sector	Nicéphore Fylla de Saint-Eudes	15 May 2021	Incumbent	PRL
Minister of Small and Medium Enterprises, Handicrafts and the Informal Sector	Jacqueline Lydia Mikolo	15 May 2021	Incumbent	PCT
Minister of Higher Education, Scientific Research and Technological Innovation	Delphine Édith Emmanuel	15 May 2021	Incumbent	Independent
Minister of Primary and Secondary Pre-school Education and Literacy	Jean-Luc Moutou	15 May 2021	Incumbent	Independent
Minister of Technical and Vocational Education, Skills Training and Employment	Ghislain Thierry Maguessa Ebomé	15 May 2021	Incumbent	PCT
Minister of Posts, Telecommunications and the Digital Economy	Leon Just Ibombo	15 May 2021	Incumbent	PCT
Minister for the Cultural, Touristic, Artistic and Leisure Industry	Lydie Pongault	27 September 2022	Incumbent	PCT
Minister of Social Affairs and Humanitarian Action	Irene Mboukou	15 May 2021	Incumbent	MAR
Minister for the Promotion of Women and the Integration of Women in Development	Jacqueline Lydia Mikolo	15 May 2021	21 May 2021	PCT
Minister for the Promotion of Women and the Integration of Women in Development	Inès Nefer Bertille Ingani	21 May 2021	Incumbent	PCT
Minister of State Control in charge of the quality of public service and the fight against anti-values	Jean-Rosaire Ibara	16 May 2021	Incumbent	PCT

== Ministers of State ==
Cabinet members
Portfolio	Minister	Took office	Left office	Party
Minister of State for the Civil Service, Labor and Social Security	Firmin Ayessa	15 May 2021	Incumbent	PCT
Minister of State for Commerce, Supplies and Consumer Affairs	Claude Alphonse Nsilou	15 May 2021	Incumbent	Citizen Rally
Minister of State for Mining Industries and Geology	Pierre Oba	15 May 2021	Incumbent	PCT
Minister of State for Land Affairs and the Public Domain	Pierre Mabiala	15 May 2021	Incumbent	PCT
Minister of State for Territorial Development, Infrastructure and Road Maintenance	Jean Jacques Bouya	15 May 2021	Incumbent	PCT

== Delegate ministers ==
Cabinet members
Portfolio	Minister	Took office	Left office	Party
Minister Delegate to the Prime Minister, in charge of State Reform	Luc-Joseph Okio	22 May 2021	Incumbent	
Minister Delegate to the Minister of the Interior’, Decentralization and Local Development, responsible for Decentralization and Local Development	Juste Désiré Mondelé	15 May 2021	Incumbent	

== See also ==
- Cabinet of the Republic of the Congo
