= Jean-Marc Thystère Tchicaya =

Congolese politician (born 1964)

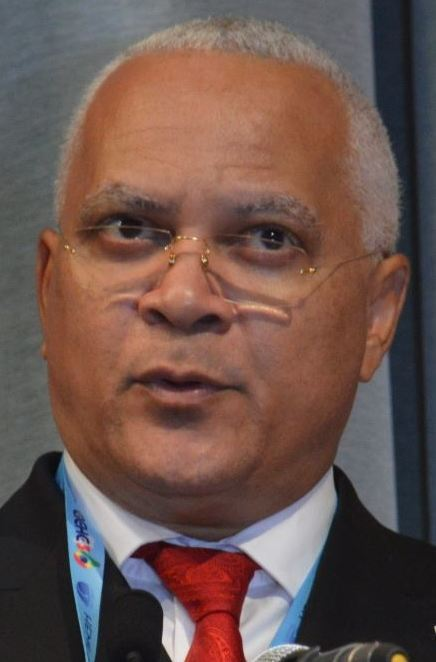
- Jean-Marc Thystère-Tchicaya in 2017

Minister of Special Economic Zones and Economic Diversification
- President: Denis Sassou Nguesso
- Prime Minister: Anatole Collinet Makosso
- Preceded by: Émile Ouosso
- Incumbent
- Assumed office 27 September 2022

Minister of Transports, Civil Aviation, and Merchant Navy
- In office 15 May 2021 – 24 September 2022
- President: Denis Sassou-Nguesso
- Prime Minister: Anatole Collinet Makosso
- Preceded by: Ingrid Ebouka-Babackas
- Succeeded by: Honoré Sayi

Minister of Hydrocarbons
- In office 20 August 2015 – 15 May 2021
- President: Denis Sassou-Nguesso
- Prime Minister: Anatole Collinet Makosso
- Preceded by: André-Raphaël Loemba
- Succeeded by: Bruno Itoua

Deputy of 1st Constituency of Mvoumvou
- Incumbent
- Assumed office 5 September 2012

Personal details
- Born: 11 April 1964 (age 61) Villeneuve-Saint-Georges, France
- Party: Rally for Democracy and Social Progress
- Parent: Jean-Pierre Thystère Tchicaya

Jean-Marc Thystère Tchicaya (born 11 April 1964) is a Congolese politician. He is the Minister of Special Economic Zones and Economic Diversification since September 2022. Before that, he was the Minister of Transports, Civil Aviation, and Merchant Navy (2021–2022), and the Minister of Hydrocarbons (2015–2021).

As a member of the Rally for Democracy and Social Progress, which he is the president of since May 2015, he is also the deputy of the first constituency of Mvoumvou (Pointe-Noire) since September 2012.

== Biography ==
=== Early life and education ===
Son of politician Jean-Pierre Thystère Tchicaya, who served as the former mayor of Pointe-Noire and president of the National Assembly of the Republic of the Congo, Jean-Marc Thystère Tchicaya was born on 11 April 1964 at Villeneuve-Saint-Georges, Val-de-Marne, France. He completed his secondary education in France at l'École supérieure des techniciens en électronique et informatique as well as at Pigier, where he got a degree as a software engineer in management computing.

=== Professional career ===
Starting from 1989, Thystère Tchicaya worked at Bull France. In 1997, he came to the Congo and began to work at Elf Congo as a computer scientist. Later, he worked for Total E&P Congo, where he directed the communication department as well as the department of relations with high institutions of the Republic of the Congo. In addition, he was also the president of the Fédération Pétrole as well as the vice president of the Union patronale et interprofessionelle du Congo (Uni Congo). Furthermore, he was a member of the consultative committee of the Extractive Industries Transparency Initiative.

=== Political career ===
==== Deputy of Mvoumvou ====
As a member of the Rally for Democracy and Social Progress (RDPS), a party created by his father and which belonged to the presidential majority, Thystère Tchicaya was elected as the deputy of the first constituency of Mvoumvou (Pointe-Noire) in the first round of the 2012 Republic of the Congo parliamentary election, with 62.52% of votes. He took power on September 5, replacing Fatou Sauthat Loember.

During the 2017 Republic of the Congo parliamentary election, he was re-elected deputy of Mvoumvou in the first round.

==== Ministerial functions ====
On 23 May 2015, Thystère Tchicaya was elected as the head of his party, the RDPS. Amidst a cabinet reshuffle a few months later, he entered the fourth Sassou-Nguesso government as Minister of Hydrocarbons, succeeding André-Raphaël Loemba. The transfer of power was on 20 August 2015.

In 2021, following the re-election of President Denis Sassou-Nguesso for a fourth term, Thystère Tchicaya was named Minister of Transports, Civil Aviation, and Merchant Navy within Anatole Collinet Makosso's government (led by Anatole Collinet Makosso). He succeeded Ingrid Ebouka-Babackas.

During another cabinet reshuffle, Thystère Tchicaya became the Minister of Special Economic Zones and Economic Diversification on 27 September 2022, succeeding Émile Ouosso, and leaving the position of Minister of Transports to Honoré Sayi.

== Controversies ==
In July 2018, Thystère Tchicaya, then Minister of Hydrocarbons, was accused by Lamyr Nguélé, president of the National Commission for the Fight Against Corruption. These accusations claimed misappropriation of public funds on the order of 2 billion CFA francs between 2015 and 2017. To defend himself, Thystère Tchicaya thus addressed a letter to Prime Minister Clément Mouamba. For many foreign observers, as well as for the members of the PCT and RDPS, these accusations were seen as a political maneuver. They suspected that the minister had held ambitions for running in the 2021 Republic of the Congo presidential election.

The majority and the government officially gave their support to the minister, denouncing the Commission's lack of independence. Later on, in September 2018, a law was enacted to replace this Commission by a High Authority of the Fight Against Corruption, which was thought to be more independent.
