= Sassou =

Sassou is a surname. Notable people with the surname include:

- Antoinette Sassou Nguesso (born 1945), First Lady of the Republic of the Congo
- Denis Sassou Nguesso (born 1943), Congolese politician
- Denis-Christel Sassou Nguesso (born 1975), Congolese politician
