= Nguesso =

Nguesso is a surname. Notable people with the surname include:

- Antoinette Sassou Nguesso (born 1945), Congolese retired teacher and public figure
- Denis-Christel Sassou Nguesso, Congolese politician
- Denis Sassou Nguesso (born 1943), Congolese politician
