= PJR =

PJR can refer to:

- P. Janardhan Reddy (1948 - 2007), an Indian politician
- Philippine Journalism Review, published by the Center for Media Freedom and Responsibility
- Proportional Justified Representation, a variant of justified representation in voting theory
- Perry Johnson Registrars, Inc., founded by the American Perry Johnson (businessman)
- Parti de la Jeune République or Ligue de la jeune République, a former political party in France; part of the Popular Front (France)
- Pole of Young Republicans, led by Congolese politician Denis-Christel Sassou Nguesso
- Pacific Journalism Review, published within the Auckland University of Technology in New Zealand
- Port Jersey Railroad; see List of common carrier freight railroads in the United States
