= Henri Ossebi =

Republic of the Congo politician

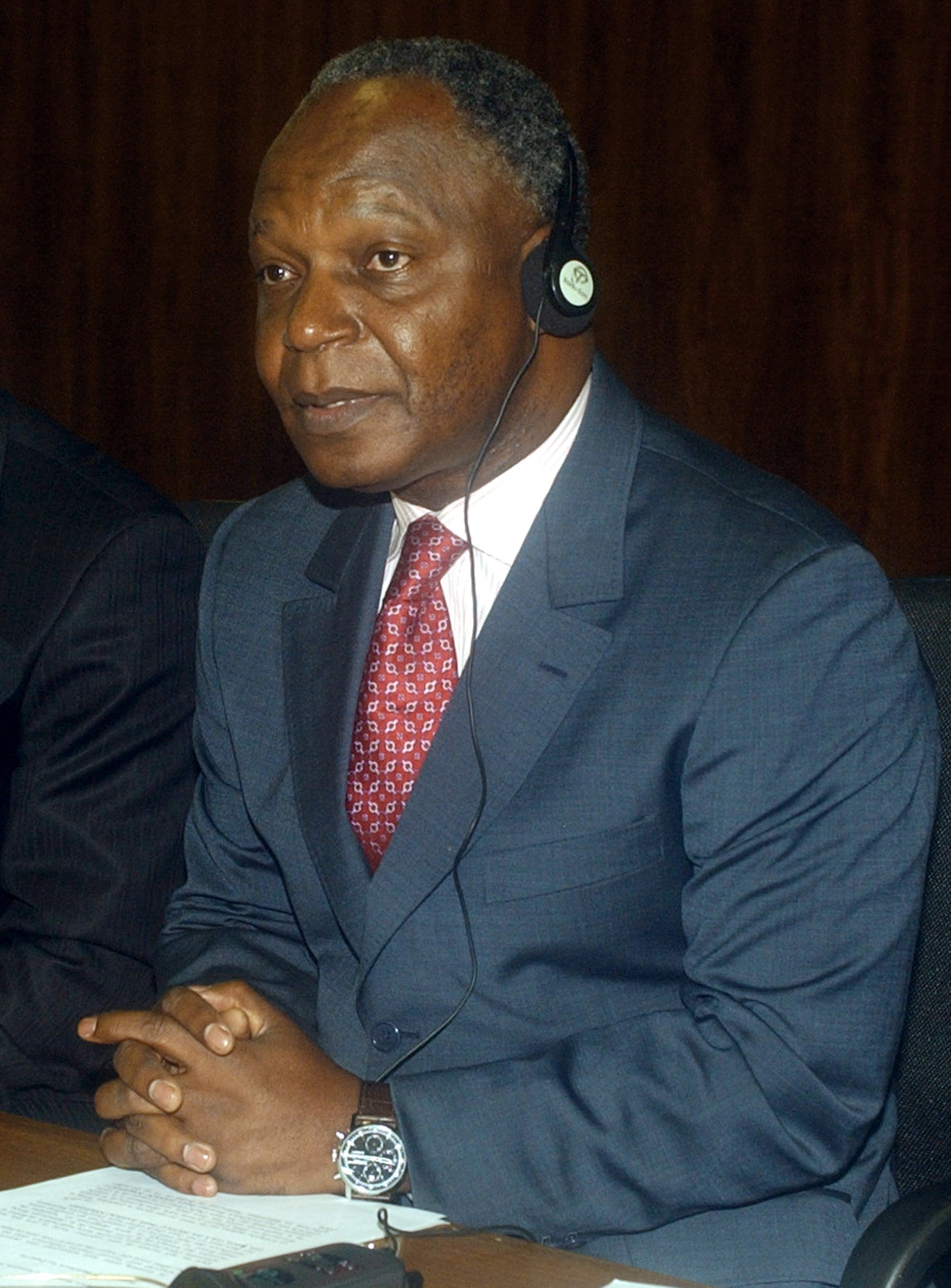
- Henri Ossebi in March 2007

Ambassador of the Republic of the Congo to UNESCO
- Incumbent
- Assumed office 2017
- President: Denis Sassou Nguesso

Minister of Energy and Hydraulics
- In office 12 December 2011 – 30 April 2016
- President: Denis Sassou Nguesso
- Preceded by: Bruno Itoua
- Succeeded by: Serge Blaise Zoniaba

Minister of Scientific Research
- In office 15 September 2009 – 12 December 2011
- President: Denis Sassou Nguesso

Minister of Higher Education
- In office 3 March 2007 – 15 September 2009
- President: Denis Sassou Nguesso

Minister of Higher Education and Scientific Research
- In office 18 August 2002 – 3 March 2007
- President: Denis Sassou Nguesso
- Preceded by: Pierre Nzila

Personal details
- Born: Gamboma, Plateaux Region, Republic of the Congo
- Party: Congolese Party of Labour (PCT)
- Other political affiliations: Agir ensemble pour le Congo
- Education: Marien Ngouabi University
- Occupation: Sociologist; Politician
- Profession: University professor

Henri Ossebi is a Congolese sociologist and politician who served in the government of Congo-Brazzaville as Minister of Energy from 2011 to 2016. Previously he was Minister of Higher Education from 2002 to 2009 and Minister of Scientific Research from 2009 to 2011.

== Political career ==
Ossebi was born in Gamboma, located in Plateaux Region. At the Marien Ngouabi University in Brazzaville, he was a professor of sociology from 1982 to 1997. After Denis Sassou Nguesso returned to power in 1997, Ossebi headed the Presidency's Department of National Education, Human Resources, and Scientific Research from 1997 to 2002. He helped establish Acting Together for Congo (Agir ensemble pour le Congo), a political association supportive of President Sassou Nguesso that was launched on 9 February 2002, with Ossebi as its General Coordinator. On 18 August 2002, he was appointed to the government as Minister of Higher Education and Scientific Research, and he succeeded Pierre Nzila in that post on 21 August. His portfolio was reduced in scope on 3 March 2007, when he was appointed as Minister of Higher Education.

In the June–August 2007 parliamentary election, Ossebi was Take Action for Congo's candidate in Abala constituency, located in Plateaux Region; he faced the candidate of the Congolese Labour Party (PCT), Gabriel Oba-Apounou (who was also the First Vice-President of the National Assembly), as well as an independent candidate, Joseph Mbossa. In the first round, Ossebi placed second behind Oba-Apounou, receiving 32.55% of the vote against 40.21% for Opa-Apounou. However, Ossebi prevailed in the second round, receiving 58.26% of the vote.

During the campaign for the July 2009 presidential election, Ossebi worked on President Sassou Nguesso's re-election campaign as Spokesman for Political Affairs, a post he shared with François Ibovi. After winning re-election, Sassou Nguesso moved Ossebi to the post of Minister of Scientific Research on 15 September 2009. At the PCT's Sixth Extraordinary Congress, held in July 2011, Ossebi was elected to the PCT's 51-member Political Bureau. In a minor government reshuffle on 12 December 2011, he switched ministries with Bruno Itoua, becoming Minister of Energy and Hydraulics. For Ossebi, the move was viewed as a promotion to a more important ministry.

In the July–August 2012 parliamentary election, Ossebi, this time standing as the PCT's candidate, was again elected to the National Assembly from Abala constituency; he won the seat in the first round with 79.95% of the vote.

After Sassou Nguesso's victory in the March 2016 presidential election, he appointed Serge Blaise Zoniaba to replace Ossebi as Minister of Energy on 30 April 2016. Sassou Nguesso instead appointed Ossebi as Ambassador to UNESCO in 2017.
