= Inès Nefer Bertille Ingani =

Congolese politician

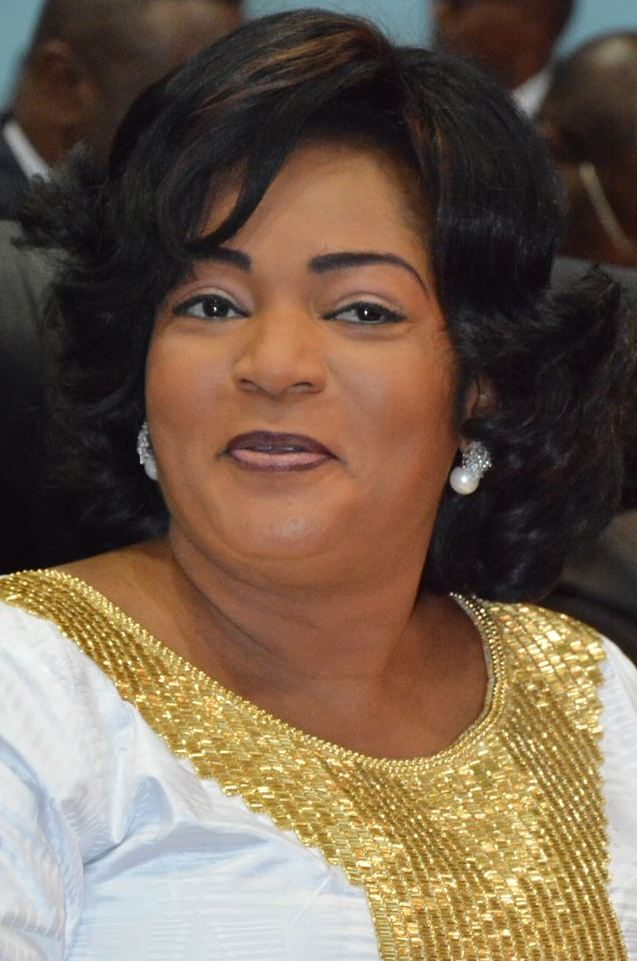
Ingani in Brazzaville (2013)

Inès Nefer Bertille Ingani (born c. 1972) is a Congolese Party of Labour (PCT) politician in Congo-Brazzaville currently serving in Anatole Collinet Makosso's government. She is the Deputy for Moungali 2, Brazzaville Department. From April 2016 to September 2019 she was Women's Minister.

== Life ==
Inès Nefer Bertille Ingani has a professional license in human resources management and management.

As president of Innovative Actions for Peace and Cultural Development (PAIDC), she organized a women's peace march on 1 March 2015. She was also a national secretary of the Organization of Congolese Women (OFC), with responsibility for sports, culture and the arts.

On 30 April 2016 President Denis Sassou Nguesso appointed Inès Nefer Bertille Ingani, aged 43, as Minister for the Promotion of Women and the Integration of Women in Development.

In September 2019 the opposition leader Pascal Tsaty Mabiala asked questions in Parliament about the income of the President's son, Denis Christel Sassou Nguesso. In an audio recording leaked to social media, Inès Nefer Bertille Ingani questioned Mabiala's integrity. Mabiala accused her of defamation, and on 17 September 2019 President Sassou Nguesso dismissed her from her ministerial post.

In November 2020 she was elected national executive secretary of the Organization of Congolese Women, succeeding Jeanne Sarah Dambendzet.
