= Mikolo =

Mikolo may refer to:

- Jacqueline Lydia Mikolo, a Congolese politician
- Mikolo (film), a 2023 Nigerian family fantasy film
