= First Lady of the Republic of the Congo =

Political position in the Republic of Congo

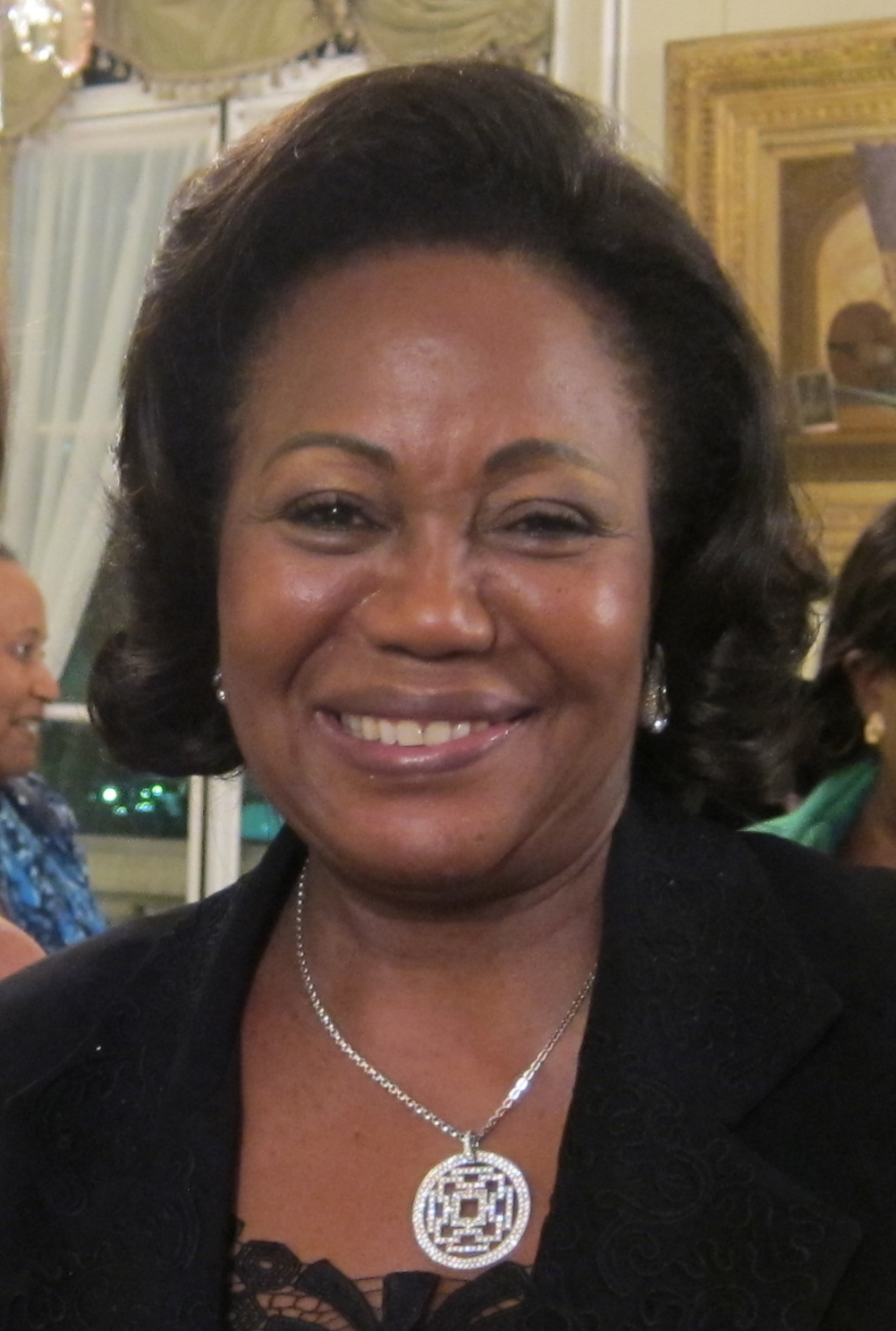
- Incumbent; Antoinette Sassou Nguesso since October 25, 1997
- Inaugural holder: Marie Massamba-Debat
- Formation: August 16, 1963

The First Lady of the Republic of the Congo (French: Première Dame de la République du Congo) is the title attributed to the wife of the president of the Republic of the Congo. The country's current first lady is Antoinette Sassou Nguesso, wife of President Denis Sassou Nguesso, who had held the position since October 25, 1997. There has been no first gentleman of the Republic of the Congo to date.

== List of first ladies of the Republic of the Congo ==
Name	Portrait	Term Began	Term Ended	President	Notes
Position vacant		August 15, 1960	August 15, 1963	Fulbert Youlou	President Youlou, a Roman Catholic priest, was unmarried.
Marie Massamba-Debat		August 16, 1963	September 4, 1968	Alphonse Massamba-Débat	Born c. 1928, Marie Massamba-Debat was the first First Lady of the Republic of Congo. She died on October 13, 1993, in Nantes, France.
?		September 5, 1968	January 1, 1969	Alfred Raoul	Alfred Raoul married Émilienne Raoul prior to his death in 1999.
Clotilde Ngouabi		January 1, 1969	March 18, 1972	Marien Ngouabi	Clotilde Ngouabi (née Martin), who was from Walscheid, France, was President Ngouabi's first wife. The couple married in 1962 and had two children before their divorce in 1972.
Céline Ngouabi		December 31, 1972	March 18, 1977	Marien Ngouabi	Céline Ngouabi was President Ngouabi's second wife. The couple married in 1972, shortly after his divorce from Clotilde.
Marie-Noëlle Yhombi-Opango		April 24, 1977	February 5, 1979	Joachim Yhombi-Opango	
Antoinette Sassou Nguesso		February 8, 1979	August 31, 1992	Denis Sassou Nguesso	First tenure as first lady
Jocelyne Lissouba		August 31, 1992	August 25, 1997	Pascal Lissouba	Lissouba, born Marie-Jocelyne Rosdam, was a French national
Antoinette Sassou Nguesso		August 31, 1997	Present	Denis Sassou Nguesso	
