= List of international presidential trips made by Denis Sassou Nguesso =

Denis Sassou Nguesso has made numerous public international trips to several countries as the President of the People's Republic of the Congo from 8 February 1979 to 31 August 1992 and as President of the Republic of the Congo since taking office on 25 October 1997.

== Summary ==
The number of visits per country where Denis Sassou Nguesso traveled are:

- One visit: Azerbaijan, Benin, Burundi, Gabon, Ghana, Guinea-Bissau, Kazakhstan, Mauritania, Namibia, Nigeria, Portugal, Qatar, Romania, Saudi Arabia, Singapore, the Soviet Union, Switzerland, Tanzania, Tunisia, the United Kingdom and Venezuela.
- Two visits: Algeria, Belgium, Cameroon, the Central African Republic, the Democratic Republic of the Congo, Germany, Guinea, India, the Ivory Coast, Kenya, Mali, Rwanda, Senegal, Sudan, Togo and Uganda.
- Three visits: Angola, Brazil, Cuba, Equatorial Guinea, Ethiopia, Morocco, South Africa, Turkey and the United Arab Emirates.
- Four visits: Libya and the Vatican City.
- Six visits: China, France and Italy.
- Eight visits: Russia.
- Eleven visits: United States.

== As President of the People's Republic of the Congo (1979–1992) ==
=== 1970s ===
	Country	Areas visited	Dates	Details
1	Cuba	Havana	3–9 September 1979	Met with Leader Fidel Castro and attended the 6th Summit of the Non-Aligned Movement.
2	France	Paris	31 October–2 November 1979	Met with President Valéry Giscard d'Estaing.

=== 1980s ===
	Country	Areas visited	Dates	Details
3	Cameroon	Yaoundé	16–19 January 1980	Met with President Ahmadou Ahidjo.
4	Soviet Union	Moscow	12–17 May 1981	Met with General Secretary Leonid Brezhnev.
5	France	Paris	28–30 July 1981	Met with President François Mitterrand.
6	India	New Delhi	7–12 March 1983	Met with Prime Minister Indira Gandhi and attended the 7th Summit of the Non-Aligned Movement.
7	Ethiopia	Addis Ababa	5–12 June 1983	Met with Leader Mengistu Haile Mariam and attended the 19th Summit of the Organisation of African Unity.
8	Portugal	Lisbon	24–26 November 1984	Met with President António Ramalho Eanes and Prime Minister Mário Soares.
9	India	New Delhi	24–25 January 1987	Met with Prime Minister Rajiv Gandhi and attended the AFRICA Fund Summit.
10	China	Beijing	16–18 April 1987	Met with General Secretary Zhao Ziyang.

=== 1990s ===
	Country	Areas visited	Dates	Details
11	United States	Washington, D.C. and Houston	11–14 February 1990	State visit. Met with President George H. W. Bush. Private visit to Houston afterwards.

== As President of the Republic of the Congo (1997–present) ==
=== 1990s ===
	Country	Areas visited	Dates	Details
12	France	Paris	15–17 December 1997	Met with President Jacques Chirac and Prime Minister Lionel Jospin.
13	Angola	Luanda	5–7 May 1998	Met with President José Eduardo dos Santos.

=== 2000s ===
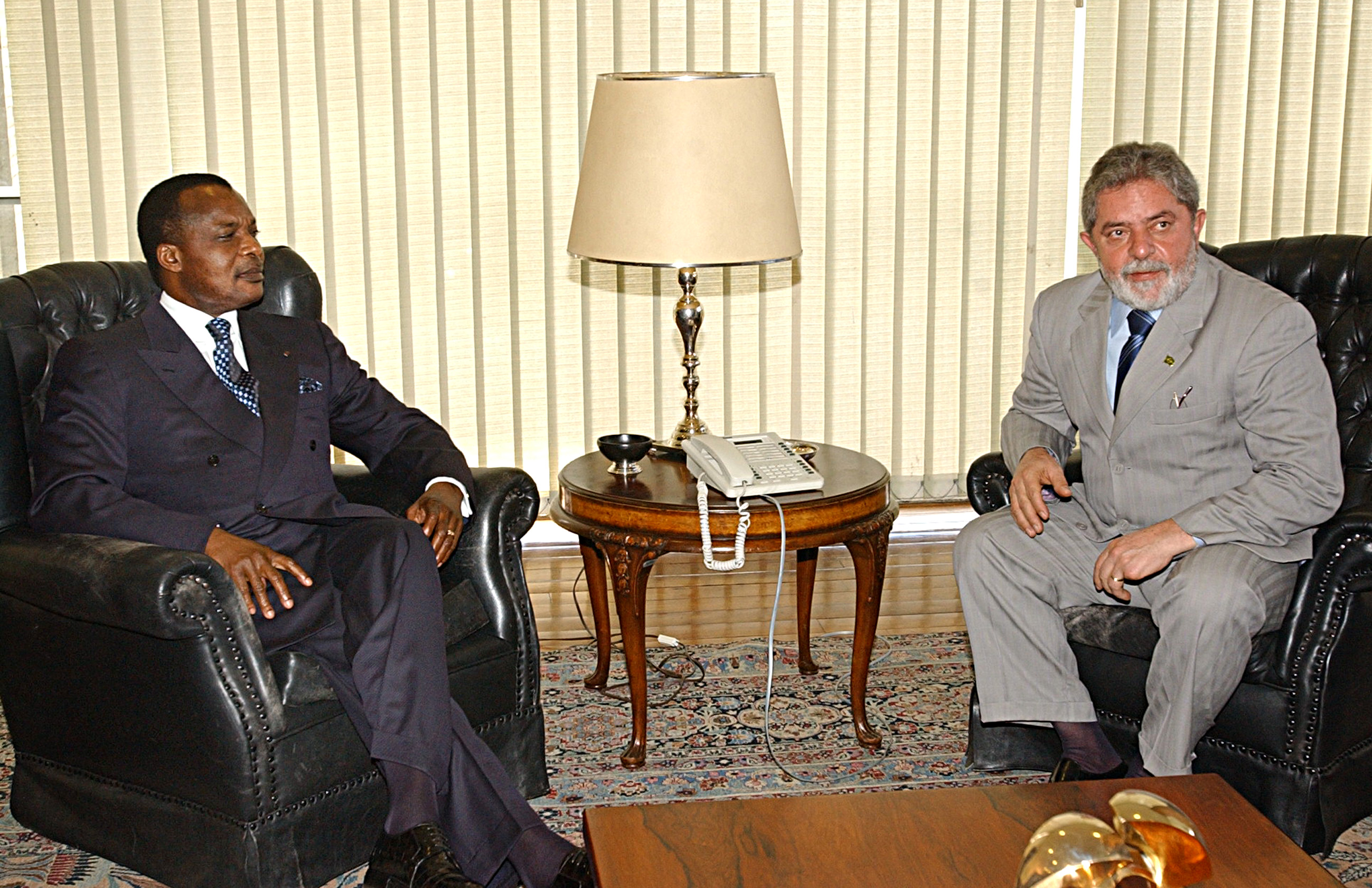
Sassou Nguesso with Brazilian President Luiz Inácio Lula da Silva in Rio de Janeiro, Brazil – 13 June 2005

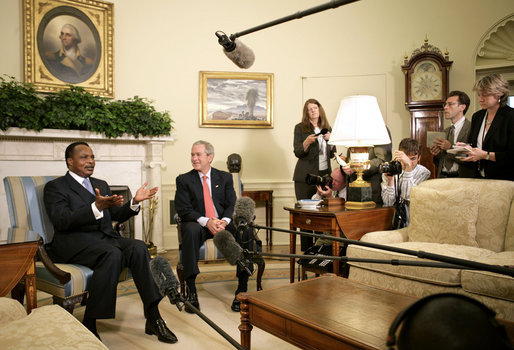
Sassou Nguesso with US President George W. Bush in Washington, D.C., United States – 5 June 2006

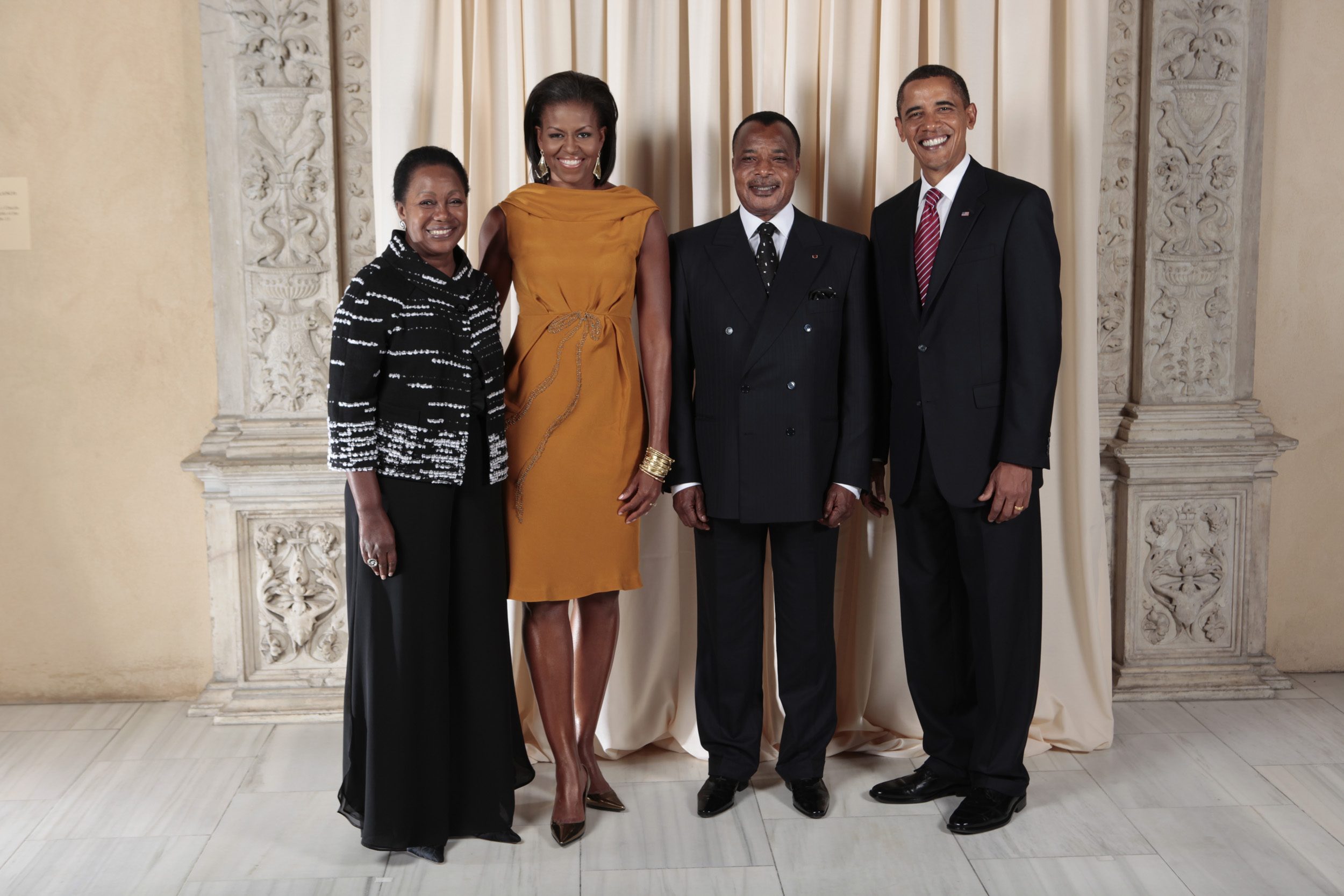
Sassou Nguesso, accompanied by First Lady Antoinette Sassou Nguesso, with US President Barack Obama and First Lady Michelle Obama in New York City, United States – 22 September 2009

	Country	Areas visited	Dates	Details
14	Italy	Rome	29–30 May 2000	Met with Prime Minister Giuliano Amato.
15	Vatican City		29 May 2000	Met with Pope John Paul II.
16	Morocco	Rabat	12–14 September 2000	Met with King Mohammed VI.
17	United States	Washington, D.C.	24–27 June 2003	Met with President George W. Bush.
18	Brazil	Rio de Janeiro	13–15 June 2005	Met with President Luiz Inácio Lula da Silva.
19	Mali	Bamako	3–5 December 2005	Met with President Amadou Toumani Touré.
20	Sudan	Khartoum	22–24 January 2006	Met with President Omar al-Bashir and attended the 6th African Union Summit.
21	Libya	Tripoli	7–9 February 2006	Met with Leader Muammar Gaddafi and attended the summit related to the Tripoli Agreement.
22	Senegal	Dakar	3–5 April 2006	Met with President Abdoulaye Wade.
23	United States	Washington, D.C.	5–7 June 2006	Working visit; met with President George W. Bush.
24	Romania	Bucharest	28–29 September 2006	Met with President Traian Băsescu and attended the 11th Summit of the Organisation internationale de la Francophonie.
25	Namibia	Windhoek	17–19 July 2007	Met with President Hifikepunye Pohamba.
26	Sudan	Khartoum	2–3 July 2008	Met with President Omar al-Bashir.
27	Libya	Tripoli	31 August–2 September 2009	Met with Leader Muammar Gaddafi and attended celebrations of the 40th anniversary of the Libyan Revolution.
28	United States	New York City	22–24 September 2009	Accompanied by First Lady Antoinette Sassou Nguesso; met with President Barack Obama and First Lady Michelle Obama; addressed the 64th session of the United Nations General Assembly.

=== 2010s ===
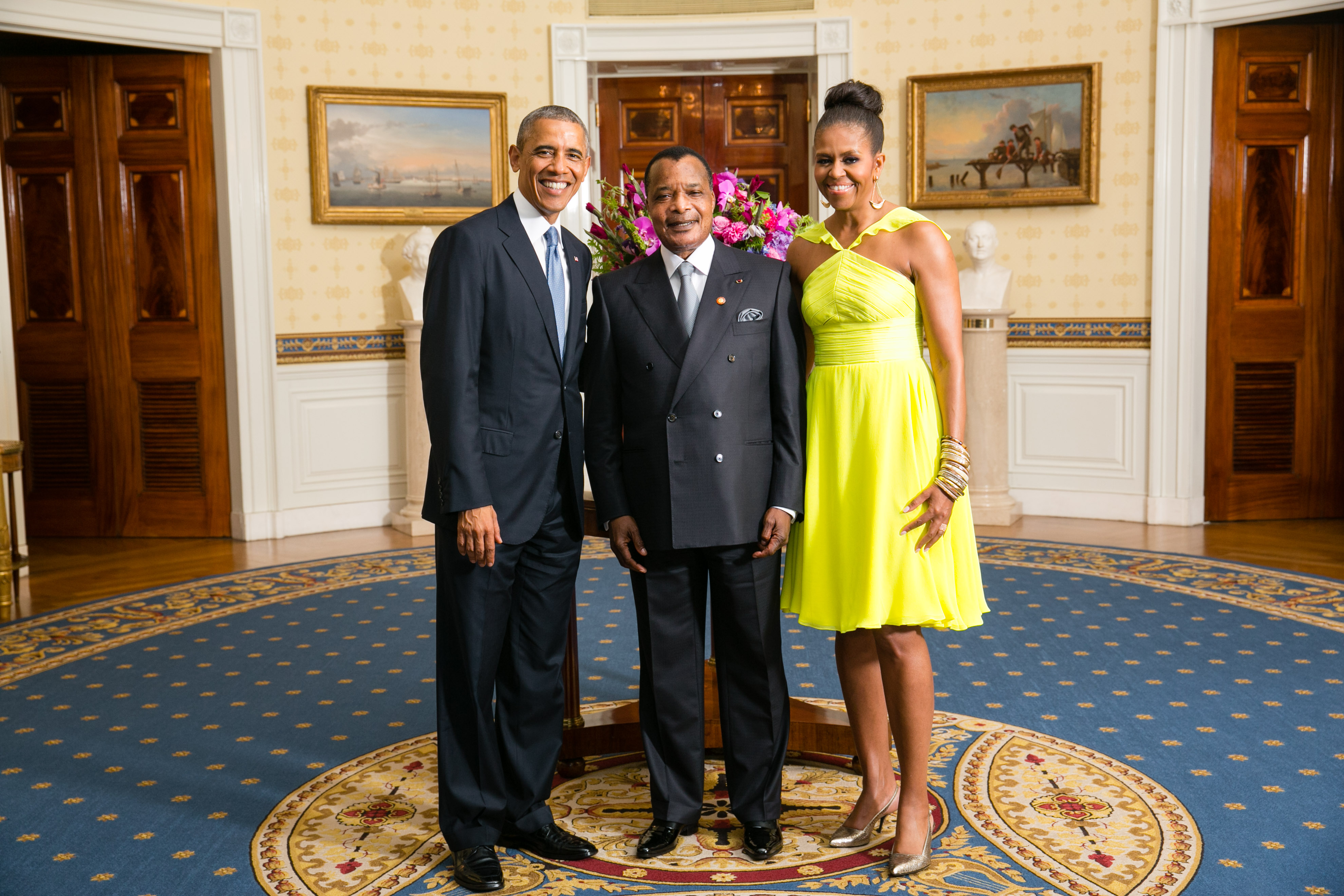
Sassou Nguesso with US President Barack Obama and First Lady Michelle Obama during the 1st US–Africa Leaders Summit in Washington, D.C., United States – 4 August 2014

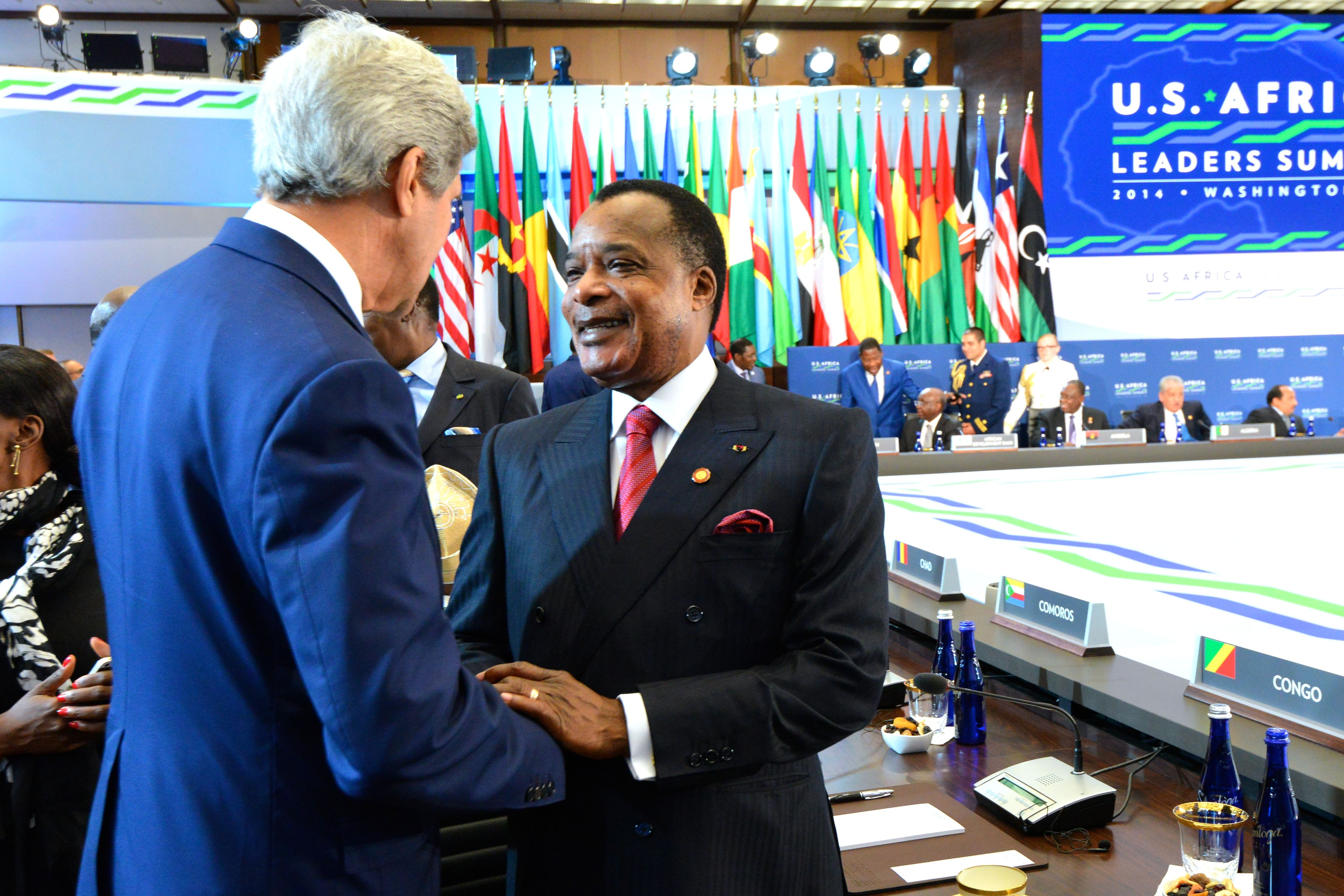
Sassou Nguesso with US Secretary of State John Kerry during the 1st US–Africa Leaders Summit in Washington, D.C., United States – 5 August 2014

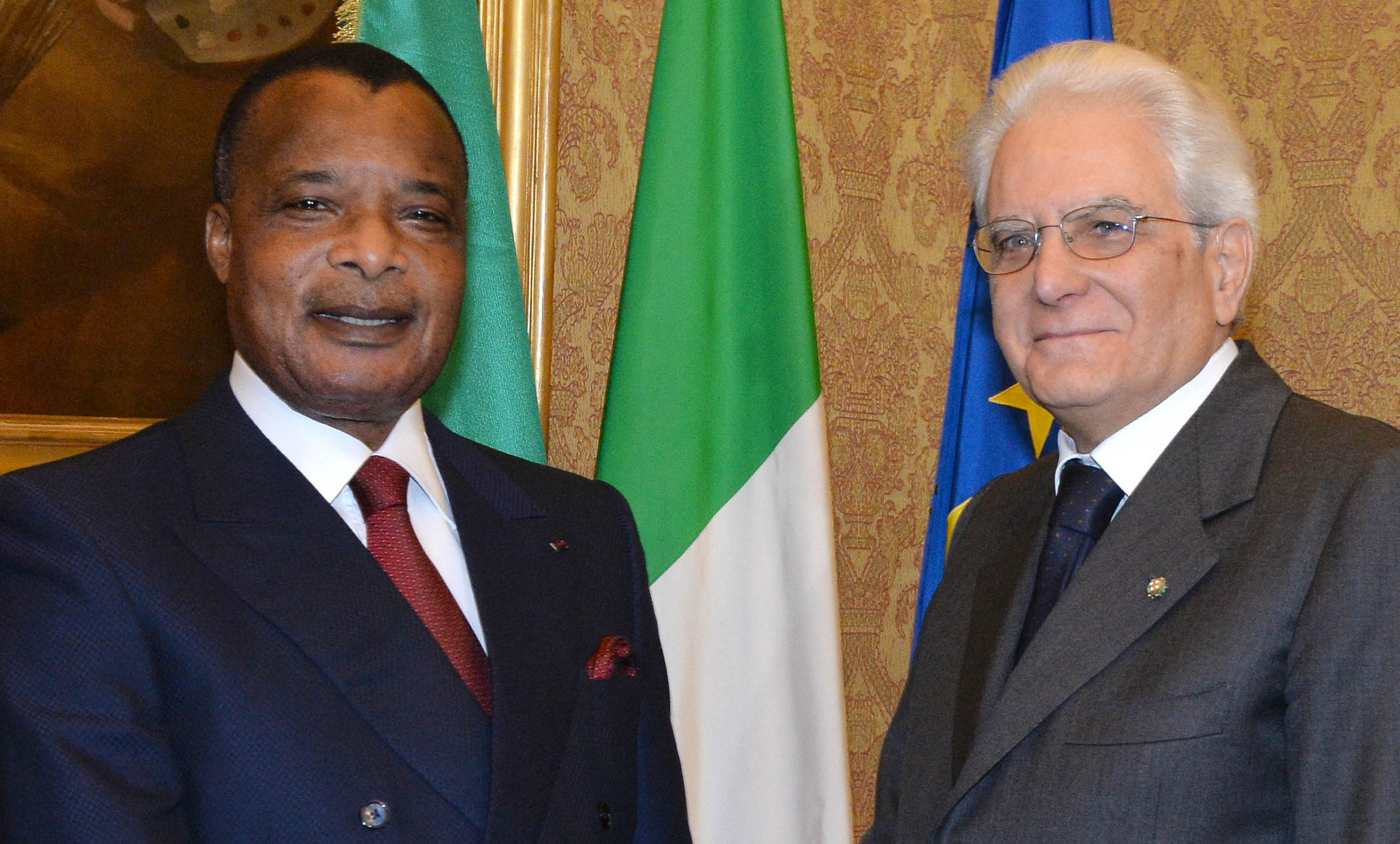
Sassou Nguesso with Italian President Sergio Mattarella in Rome, Italy – 27 February 2015

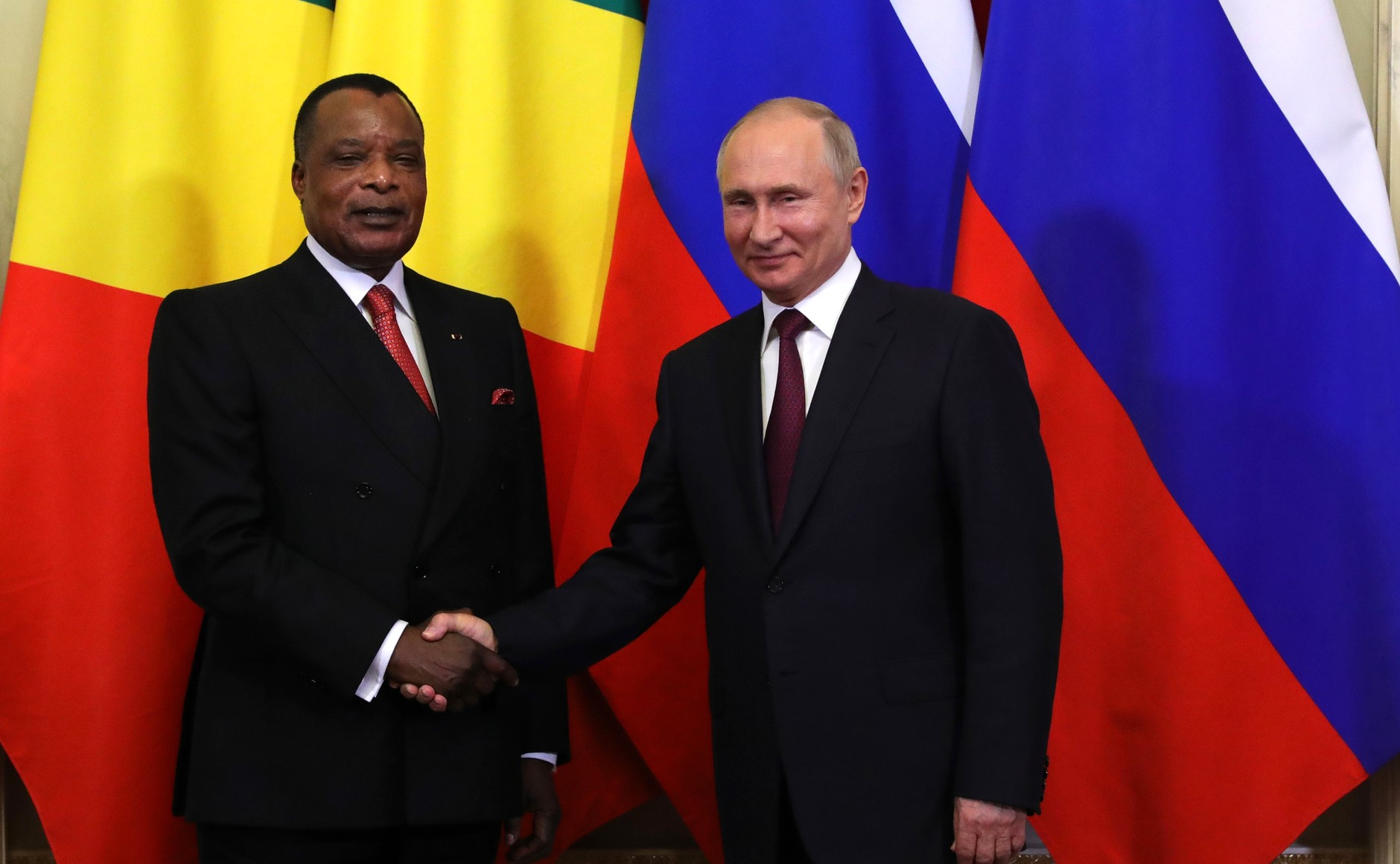
Sassou Nguesso with Russian President Vladimir Putin in Moscow, Russia – 21 May 2019

	Country	Areas visited	Dates	Details
29	South Africa	Pretoria	8–9 April 2010	Met with President Jacob Zuma.
30	Italy	Rome	24–25 May 2010	Met with Prime Minister Silvio Berlusconi.
31	Vatican City		24 May 2010	Met with Pope Benedict XVI.
32	Uganda	Kampala	24–26 July 2010	Met with President Yoweri Museveni and attended the 15th African Union Summit.
33	Togo	Lomé	5–8 February 2011	Met with President Faure Gnassingbé.
34	Benin	Cotonou	8–10 February 2011	Met with President Thomas Boni Yayi.
35	Libya	Tripoli	10–12 April 2011	Joined the African Union high-level panel on Libya; met with Leader Muammar Gaddafi.
36	Singapore		3–7 July 2011	Met with President S. R. Nathan and Prime Minister Lee Hsien Loong.
37	Turkey	Ankara	15–16 November 2012	Met with President Abdullah Gül and Prime Minister Recep Tayyip Erdoğan.
38	Equatorial Guinea	Malabo	21–23 February 2013	Met with President Teodoro Obiang Nguema Mbasogo and attended the 3rd Africa–South America Summit.
39	Burundi	Bujumbura	26–28 July 2013	Met with President Pierre Nkurunziza.
40	Qatar	Doha	17–19 November 2013	Met with Sheikh Tamim bin Hamad Al Thani.
41	Italy	Rome	9–10 December 2013	Met with Prime Minister Enrico Letta.
42	Vatican City		9 December 2013	Met with Pope Francis.
43	Belgium	Brussels	2–4 April 2014	Met with Prime Minister Elio Di Rupo and attended the 4th European Union–African Union Summit.
44	China	Beijing	11–19 June 2014	Met with President Xi Jinping and Premier Li Keqiang.
45	United States	Washington, D.C.	4–6 August 2014	Met with President Barack Obama, First Lady Michelle Obama and Secretary of State John Kerry; attended the 1st US–Africa Leaders Summit.
46	United States	New York City	25–27 September 2014	Addressed the 69th session of the United Nations General Assembly.
47	Cuba	Havana	1–4 December 2014	Met with Leader Raúl Castro.
48	Tunisia	Tunis	21–22 January 2015	Met with President Beji Caid Essebsi.
49	Italy	Rome	26–28 February 2015	Met with President Sergio Mattarella and Prime Minister Matteo Renzi.
50	South Africa	Johannesburg	13–15 June 2015	Met with President Jacob Zuma and attended the 25th African Union Summit.
51	Togo	Lomé	23–24 November 2015	Met with President Faure Gnassingbé.
52	Guinea	Conakry	13–14 December 2015	Attended the inauguration of President Alpha Condé.
53	China	Beijing	4–7 July 2016	Met with President Xi Jinping and Premier Li Keqiang.
54	Morocco	Marrakesh	14–16 November 2016	Met with King Mohammed VI and attended the 22nd United Nations Climate Change Conference (COP22).
55	Cuba	Havana	29 November–4 December 2016	Met with Leader Raúl Castro and attended the state funeral of Fidel Castro.
56	Mali	Bamako	13–15 January 2017	Met with President Ibrahim Boubacar Keïta.
57	Algeria	Algiers	27–29 March 2017	Met with President Abdelaziz Bouteflika and Prime Minister Abdelmalek Sellal.
58	Morocco	Rabat	14–15 June 2017	Met with King Mohammed VI.
59	United States	New York City	19–21 September 2017	Addressed the 72nd session of the United Nations General Assembly.
60	Germany	Bonn	15–17 November 2017	Attended the 23rd United Nations Climate Change Conference (COP23).
61	Saudi Arabia	Riyadh	25–27 March 2018	Met with King Salman and Crown Prince Mohammed bin Salman.
62	Mauritania	Nouakchott	28 June–2 July 2018	Met with President Mohamed Ould Abdel Aziz and attended the 31st African Union Summit.
63	Guinea	Conakry	1–2 October 2018	Met with President Alpha Condé and attended the 60th anniversary of Guinea’s independence.
64	Russia	Moscow	21–23 May 2019	Met with President Vladimir Putin.
65	France	Paris	2–4 September 2019	Met with President Emmanuel Macron.
66	Russia	Sochi	22–24 October 2019	Met with President Vladimir Putin and attended the 1st Russia–Africa Summit.

=== 2020s ===
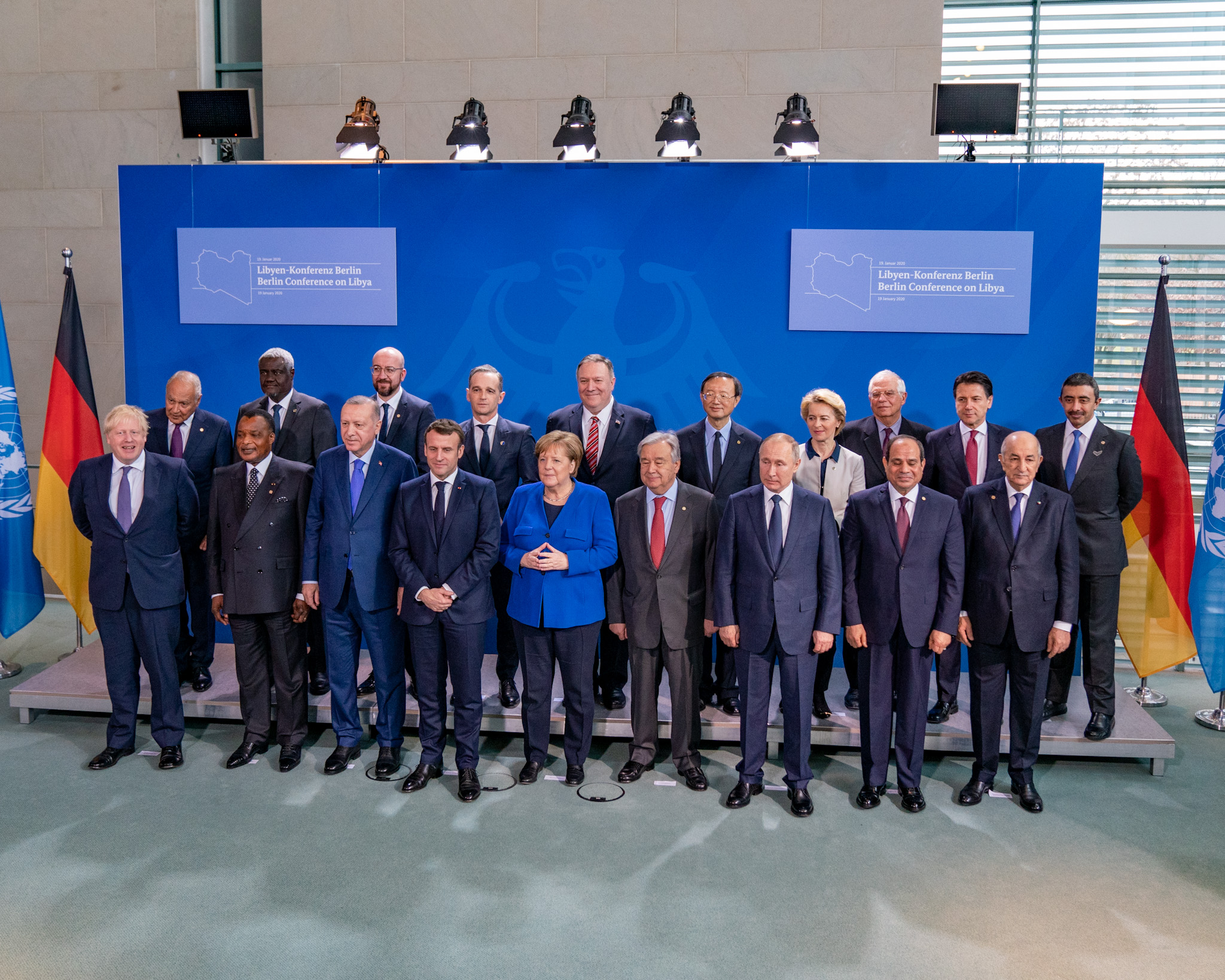
Sassou Nguesso with German Chancellor Angela Merkel and other leaders at the Berlin Conference on Libya in Berlin, Germany – 19 January 2020

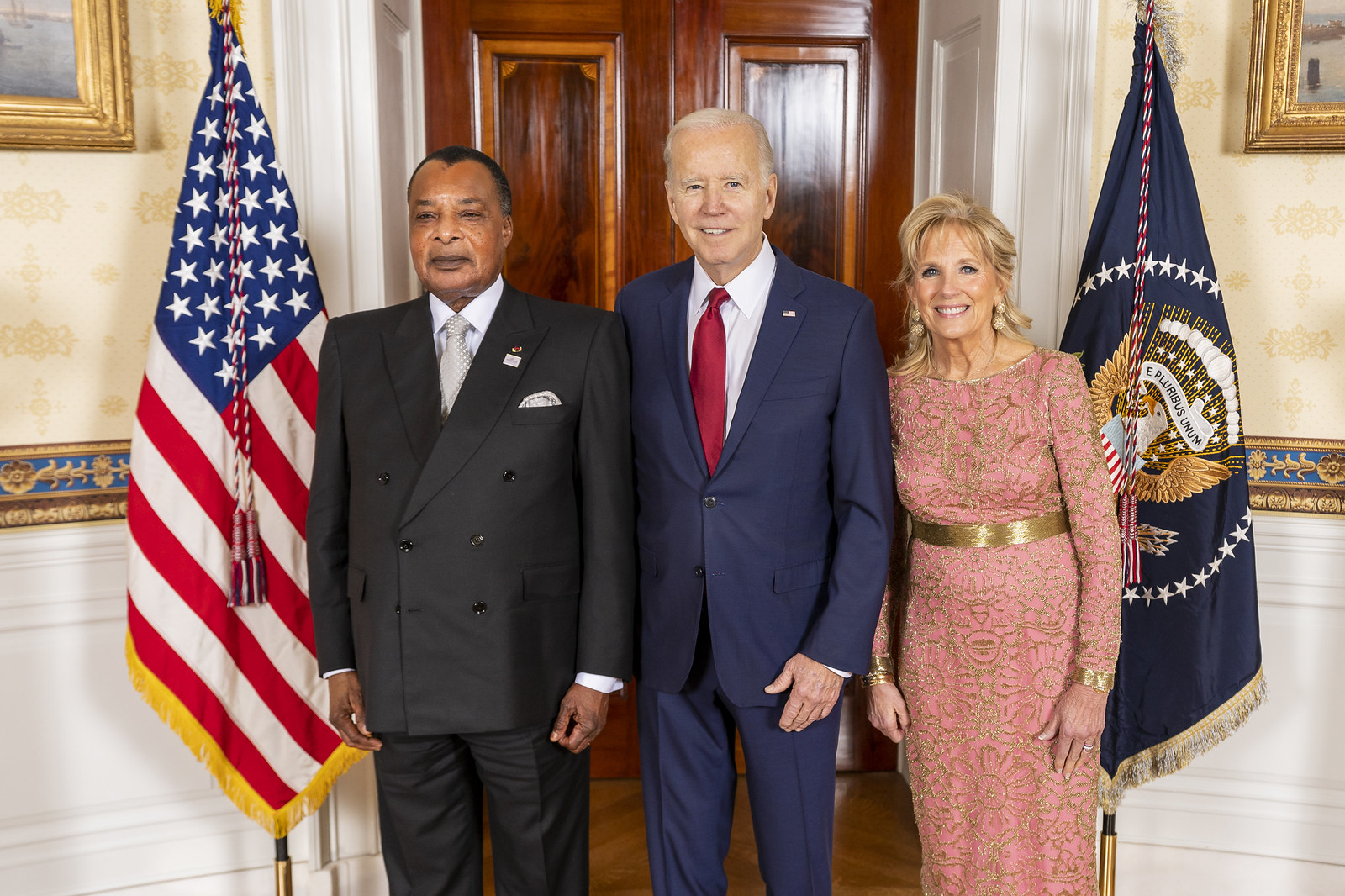
Sassou Nguesso with US President Joe Biden and First Lady Jill Biden during the 2nd US–Africa Leaders Summit in Washington, D.C., United States – 14 December 2022

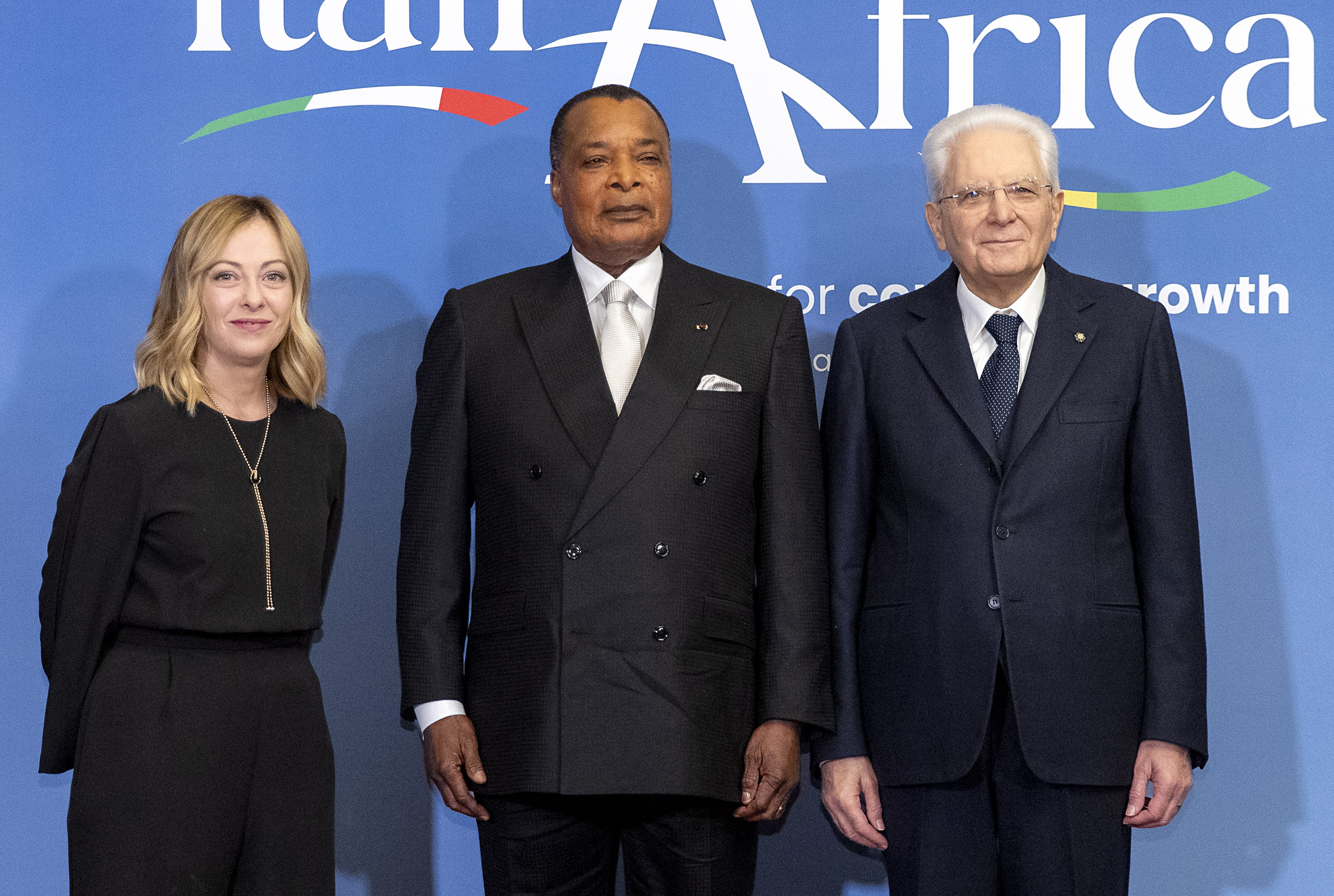
Sassou Nguesso with Italian President Sergio Mattarella and Prime Minister Giorgia Meloni during the 2024 Italy–Africa Summit in Rome, Italy – 28 January 2024

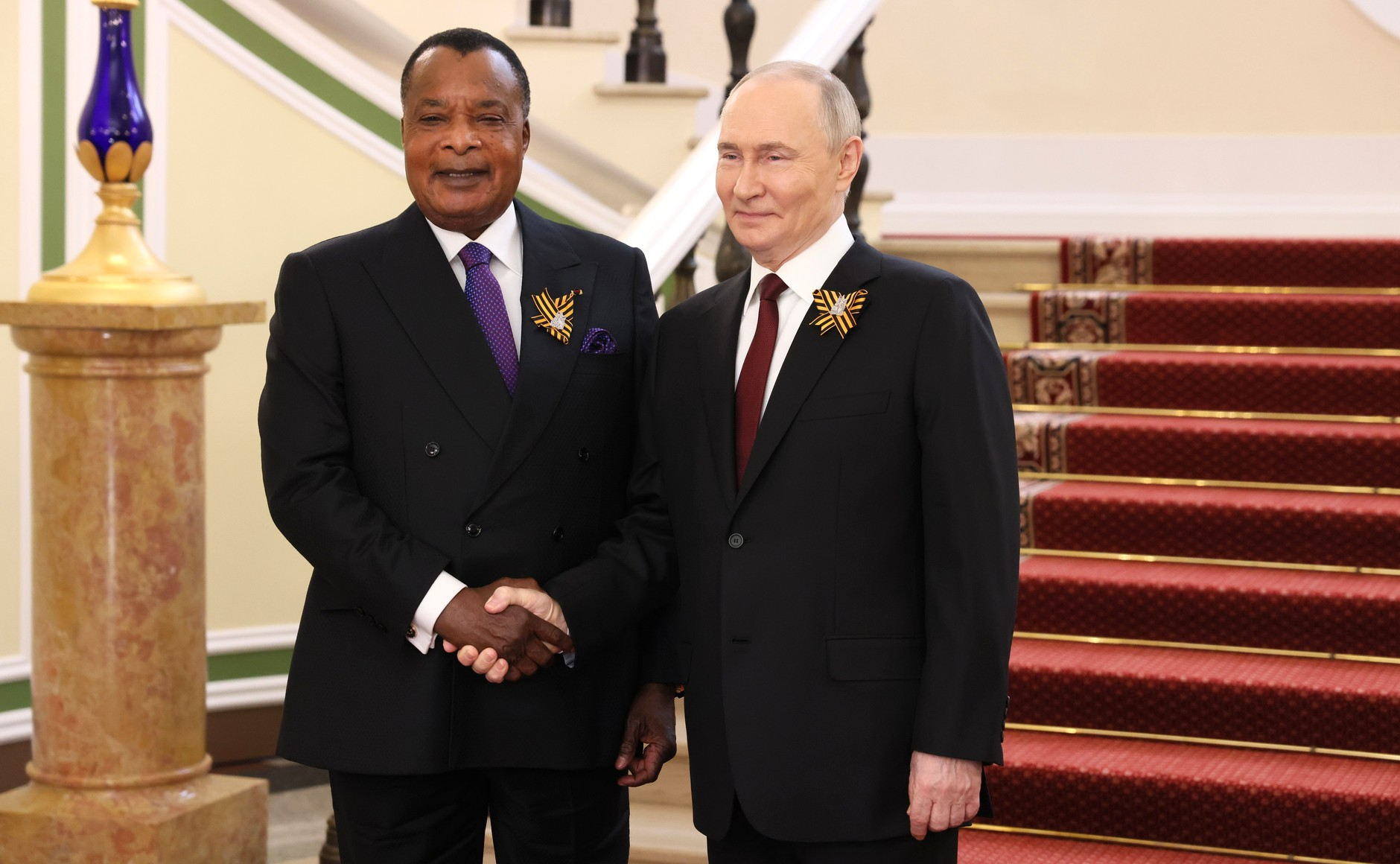
Sassou Nguesso with Russian President Vladimir Putin in Moscow, Russia – 9 May 2025

	Country	Areas visited	Dates	Details
67	Germany	Berlin	19–20 January 2020	Met with Chancellor Angela Merkel and attended the Berlin Conference on Libya.
68	United States	New York City	23–25 September 2020	Addressed the 75th session of the United Nations General Assembly.
69	Uganda	Kampala	11–13 May 2021	Attended the inauguration of President Yoweri Museveni.
70	Switzerland	Montreux	15 August–10 September 2021	Underwent medical examinations.
71	Belgium	Brussels	17–19 February 2022	Met with Prime Minister Alexander De Croo and attended the 6th European Union–African Union Summit.
72	Algeria	Algiers	4–6 July 2022	Met with President Abdelmadjid Tebboune and attended the 60th anniversary of Algerian independence.
73	Senegal	Dakar	6–8 July 2022	Met with President Macky Sall.
74	Turkey	Istanbul	2–3 September 2022	Met with President Recep Tayyip Erdoğan.
75	Kenya	Nairobi	12–14 September 2022	Attended the inauguration of President William Ruto.
76	United Kingdom	London	18–19 September 2022	Met with Prime Minister Liz Truss and attended the state funeral of Queen Elizabeth II.
77	Equatorial Guinea	Malabo	7–8 December 2022	Attended the inauguration of President Teodoro Obiang Nguema Mbasogo.
78	United States	Washington, D.C.	13–15 December 2022	Met with President Joe Biden and First Lady Jill Biden; attended the 2nd US–Africa Leaders Summit.
79	Cameroon	Yaoundé	16–17 March 2023	Met with President Paul Biya and attended a CEMAC summit.
80	Nigeria	Abuja	28–30 May 2023	Attended the inauguration of President Bola Tinubu.
81	Ivory Coast	Yamoussoukro	12–15 June 2023	Met with President Alassane Ouattara.
82	France	Paris	22–24 June 2023	Met with President Emmanuel Macron.
83	Kenya	Nairobi	7–9 July 2023	Met with President William Ruto.
84	Democratic Republic of the Congo	Kinshasa	21 July 2023	Met with President Félix Tshisekedi.
85	Rwanda	Kigali	21–23 July 2023	Met with President Paul Kagame.
86	Russia	Saint Petersburg	26–28 July 2023	Met with President Vladimir Putin and attended the 2nd Russia–Africa Summit.
87	Venezuela	Caracas	31 July–2 August 2023	Met with President Nicolás Maduro.
88	Brazil	Belém	9–11 August 2023	Met with President Luiz Inácio Lula da Silva.
89	South Africa	Johannesburg	22–24 August 2023	Met with President Cyril Ramaphosa and attended the 15th BRICS summit.
90	United States	New York City	20–22 September 2023	Addressed the 78th session of the United Nations General Assembly.
91	China	Beijing	16–18 October 2023	Met with President Xi Jinping and Premier Li Qiang.
92	United Arab Emirates	Dubai	30 November–3 December 2023	Attended the 28th United Nations Climate Change Conference (COP28).
93	Italy	Rome	27–29 January 2024	Met with President Sergio Mattarella and Prime Minister Giorgia Meloni; attended the Italy–Africa Summit.
94	United Arab Emirates	Abu Dhabi	12–13 February 2024	Met with Sheikh Mohamed bin Zayed Al Nahyan.
95	Ethiopia	Addis Ababa	16–18 February 2024	Met with Prime Minister Abiy Ahmed and attended the 37th African Union Summit.
96	Azerbaijan	Baku	3–5 April 2024	Met with President Ilham Aliyev.
97	Angola	Luanda	20–22 June 2024	Met with President João Lourenço.
98	Russia	Moscow	27 June 2024	Official visit; met with President Vladimir Putin; awarded the Order of Honour.
99	Ghana	Accra	20–21 July 2024	Met with President Nana Akufo-Addo.
100	Kazakhstan	Astana	2–3 August 2024	Met with President Kassym-Jomart Tokayev.
101	Rwanda	Kigali	12–13 August 2024	Met with President Paul Kagame.
102	China	Beijing	2–6 September 2024	Met with President Xi Jinping and Premier Li Qiang; attended the Forum on China–Africa Cooperation.
103	Equatorial Guinea	Malabo	18–20 October 2024	Met with President Teodoro Obiang Nguema Mbasogo and attended an ECCAS summit.
104	Russia	Kazan	22–24 October 2024	Met with President Vladimir Putin and attended the 16th BRICS summit.
105	Guinea-Bissau	Bissau	15–17 November 2024	Met with President Umaro Sissoco Embaló.
106	Italy	Rome	24–26 November 2024	Met with Prime Minister Giorgia Meloni.
107	Vatican City		25 November 2024	Met with Pope Francis.
108	Libya	Tripoli and Benghazi	9–11 December 2024	Met with Presidential Council Chairman Mohamed al-Menfi and Libyan National Army commander Khalifa Haftar.
109	Tanzania	Dar es Salaam	27–29 January 2025	Met with President Samia Suluhu Hassan and attended the Africa Heads of State Energy Summit.
110	Ethiopia	Addis Ababa	13–16 February 2025	Met with Prime Minister Abiy Ahmed and attended the 38th African Union Summit.
111	United Arab Emirates	Abu Dhabi	7–9 April 2025	Met with Sheikh Mohamed bin Zayed Al Nahyan.
112	Russia	Moscow	7–9 May 2025	Met with President Vladimir Putin and attended the 80th Moscow Victory Day Parade.
113	France	Paris	23–26 May 2025	Met with President Emmanuel Macron.
114	China	Beijing	2–4 September 2025	Met with President Xi Jinping and Premier Li Qiang and attended the 80th China Victory Day Parade. Also met Russian President Vladimir Putin on the sidelines.
115	Central African Republic	Bangui	10–11 September 2025	Met with President Faustin-Archange Touadéra.
116	United States	New York City	23–25 September 2025	Addressed the 80th session of the United Nations General Assembly.
117	Brazil	Belém	5–7 November 2025	Met with President Luiz Inácio Lula da Silva and attended the 30th United Nations Climate Change Conference (COP30).
118	Angola	Luanda	10–11 November 2025	Met with President João Lourenço and attended the 50th anniversary of Angola’s independence.
119	Ivory Coast	Abidjan	7–9 December 2025	Attended the inauguration of President Alassane Ouattara.
120	Democratic Republic of the Congo	Kinshasa	24–25 January 2026	Met with President Félix Tshisekedi.
121	Central African Republic	Bangui	30–31 March 2026	Met with President Faustin-Archange Touadéra.
122	Russia	Moscow	28–29 April 2026	Met with President Vladimir Putin on a state visit.
123	Gabon	Libreville	3–5 May 2026	Met with President Brice Oligui Nguema.
124	France	Paris	8–11 September 2026	Met with President Emmanuel Macron at the Élysée Palace and attended the first International Space Summit at the Grand Palais. Proposed a space partnership for the Congo Basin and offered to host a regional Congo Basin space observatory in Brazzaville. He also met Rwandan President Paul Kagame and Kazakh Deputy Prime Minister Zhaslan Madiyev on the sidelines.
125	Russia	Moscow	25–29 October 2026	Met with President Vladimir Putin at the Kremlin and attended the 3rd Russia–Africa Summit.
126	Turkey	Antalya	10–14 November 2026	Attended the 31st United Nations Climate Change Conference (COP31) and addressed the Leaders' Summit on 11 November, urging all UN member states to take on the UN Decade for Afforestation and Reforestation. He thanked President Recep Tayyip Erdoğan for Turkey's hospitality.

== See also ==
- Foreign relations of the Republic of the Congo
