= Loemba =

Loemba is a Congolese surname. Notable people with the surname include:

- André-Raphael Loemba, Congolese politician
- Yannick Loemba (born 1990), Congolese footballer
