= 900 Biscayne Bay =

Building in Miami, Florida

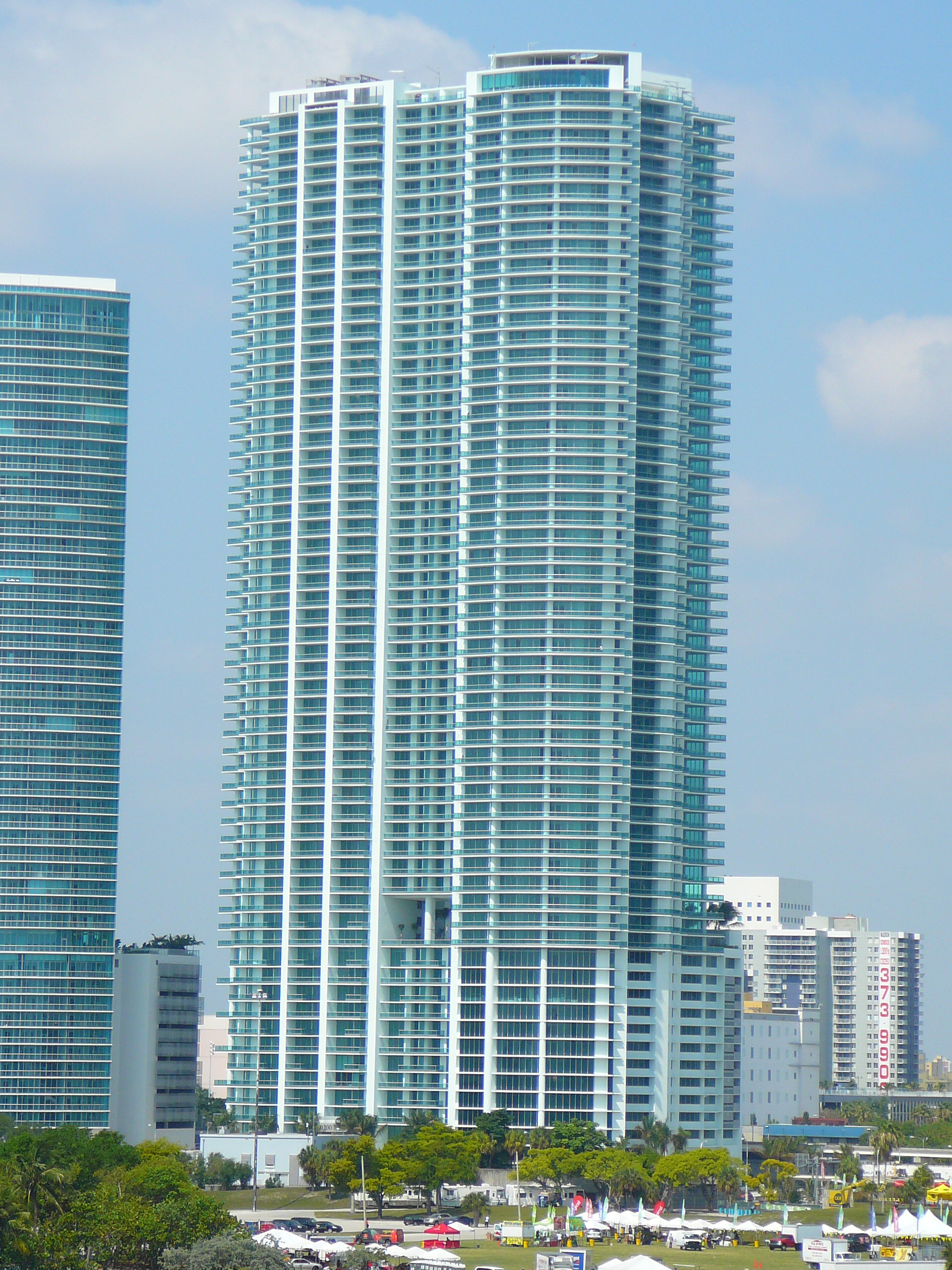
- 900 Biscayne Bay in May 2008
- Interactive map of the 900 Biscayne Bay area

General information
- Type: Residential
- Location: 900 Biscayne Boulevard; Miami, Florida, 33132; United States
- Construction started: 2005
- Completed: 2008
- Opening: 2008

Height
- Architectural: 650 ft (198 m)

Technical details
- Floor count: 63
- Lifts/elevators: 13

Design and construction
- Architect: Luis Revuelta
- Architecture firm: Revuelta, Vega and Leon
- Developer: Terra-Adi International Developments
- Structural engineer: DeSimone Consulting Engineers
- Other designers: Sam Robin Design
- Main contractor: Pavarini Construction Southeast, Inc.

Other information
- Parking: 800 Spaces

900 Biscayne Bay is a 63-story residential skyscraper at 900 Biscayne Boulevard in northeastern Downtown Miami, Florida, United States. The tower was constructed between 2005 and 2008 and stands 650 feet (200 m) tall. It is the thirteenth-tallest building in Miami and eleventh-tallest in the state of Florida. It was the tallest all-residential skyscraper in the city and the state until it was surpassed by One Thousand Museum in 2019.

== Site ==
The tower occupies a city block bounded by North East 2nd Avenue, Biscayne Boulevard, and North East 9th and 10th Streets, in Downtown Miami, Florida, United States. Whereas the main entrance is located on Biscayne Boulevard, the 800-space underground car park is accessible via North East 10th Street, to the north. The street level is home to several cafés and restaurants, including CRAFT Bayside, Ideal Nutrition, Pierogi One Orlando, Sagrado Cafe, and Sushi Sake Biscayne.

It is located across the street from the Frost Science Museum, the Pérez Art Museum and the Kaseya Center. It is also adjacent to Ten Museum Park, another Miami residential high-rise, and the Park West Metromover station.

== Architecture ==
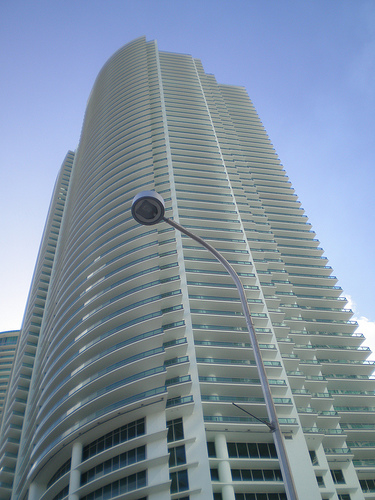
900 Biscayne Bay at street level.

The 1,500,000 square feet (140,000 m2) tower has 516 residential condominiums and 800 parking spaces. Units include 1, 2, 3 and 4‑bedroom layouts with private terraces, floor‑to‑ceiling impact‑resistant windows and energy‑efficient sliding glass, and oversized walk‑in closets. Many residences feature European style kitchens with premium appliances such as Sub‑Zero and Miele.

There are eleven typical units on each of the lower floors, with two‑level townhomes and penthouses on the uppermost floors. Penthouses occupy the highest levels with larger floor plans and high‑end interior finishes. The bottom three floors consist of a three‑story lobby, retail shops, restaurant, and an outdoor café. The three storey main lobby is located 18 feet (5.5 m) above the ground and there is a separate porte cochere entrance and lobby for the offices.

Post-tensioned slabs with concrete shear walls and columns (up to 12 ksi strength) comprised the primary structure; other aspects for the project required innovative and creative analysis (e.g., site settlement during construction, creep/shortening analysis of vertical members and effects on slab levelness.)

== History ==
=== Construction ===
The tower was built from 2005 to 2008 by architect Luis Revuelta of Revuelta, Vega and Leon architects, for $165 million.The primary structural design for the project was performed in less than 3 months in order to meet overall project scheduling needs. Originally planned to rise 712 feet (217 m) and 65 floors, the building went through a height reduction during its construction, with a decorative rooftop spire and two floors being removed from the final plans.

=== Defects ===
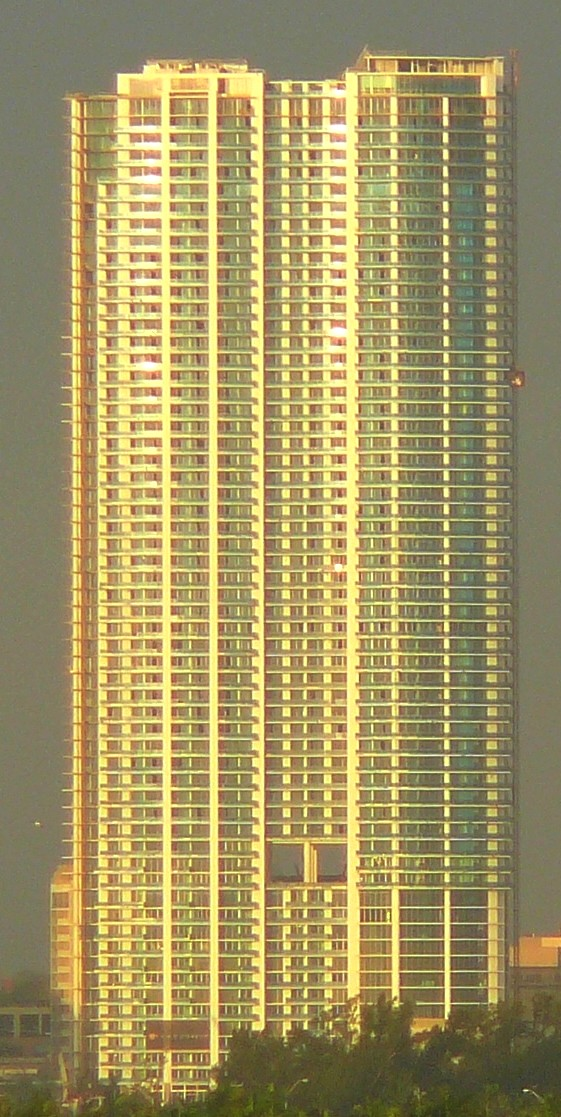
900 Biscayne Bay in 2007.

In 2015, the project's main contractor, Hialeah-based Pavarini Construction Co., and insurance firm Steadfast Insurance Co, filed a lawsuit against insurer American Ace Insurance Company for the alleged poor construction works of two subcontractors.

The case was brought fourth when the building's owner demanded reparation works to the construction company. According to court documents, Pavarini had hired Alan W. Smith and TCOE Corp. for the installation of concrete masonry and reinforcing steel. The suit stated that “a significant amount of reinforcing steel was either omitted entirely or improperly installed throughout the building, including placement within its critical concrete structural elements, causing destabilization.”

The compromised structural integrity of the building resulted in excessive movement of its components, leading to stucco debonding and cracking in walls and structural elements, and even in the mechanical enclosure of the penthouse, causing water penetration. U.S. District Judge James Lawrence King granted Pavarini partial summary judgement, and ordered American Ace to pay $23 million in damages.

== Residents ==
In 2015, NBA player Kevin Durant sold his former penthouse at 900 Biscayne Bay, where he shared neighbors with other NBA players such as Dwyane Wade. The penthouse was then rented for a record $18,000 per month, the highest rental in Miami at the time, before going for sale in 2019 for $3.6 million. It has 4,000 sq ft (370 m^{2}) of space inside and 1,000 sq ft (93 m^{2}) of terrace space, 3 bedrooms, 4.5 bathrooms, and a private cinema, among other lavish features.

In 2020, Miami federal prosecutors filed a lawsuit against Denis-Christel Sassou Nguesso, a Congolese minister of parliament, son of the president of the Republic of Congo Denis Sassou Nguesso, for purchasing in 2012 a $2.8 million penthouse at 900 Biscayne Bay with misappropriated funds. Nguesso allegedly embezzled millions of dollars from Congo's state-owned oil company, Société Nationale des Pétroles du Congo (National Company of Congo Petroleums), of which he is the deputy manager. Nguesso's penthouse unit, dubbed "Congo condo", is 3,500 sq ft (330 m^{2}) and has three bedrooms and four bathrooms.

== Gallery ==
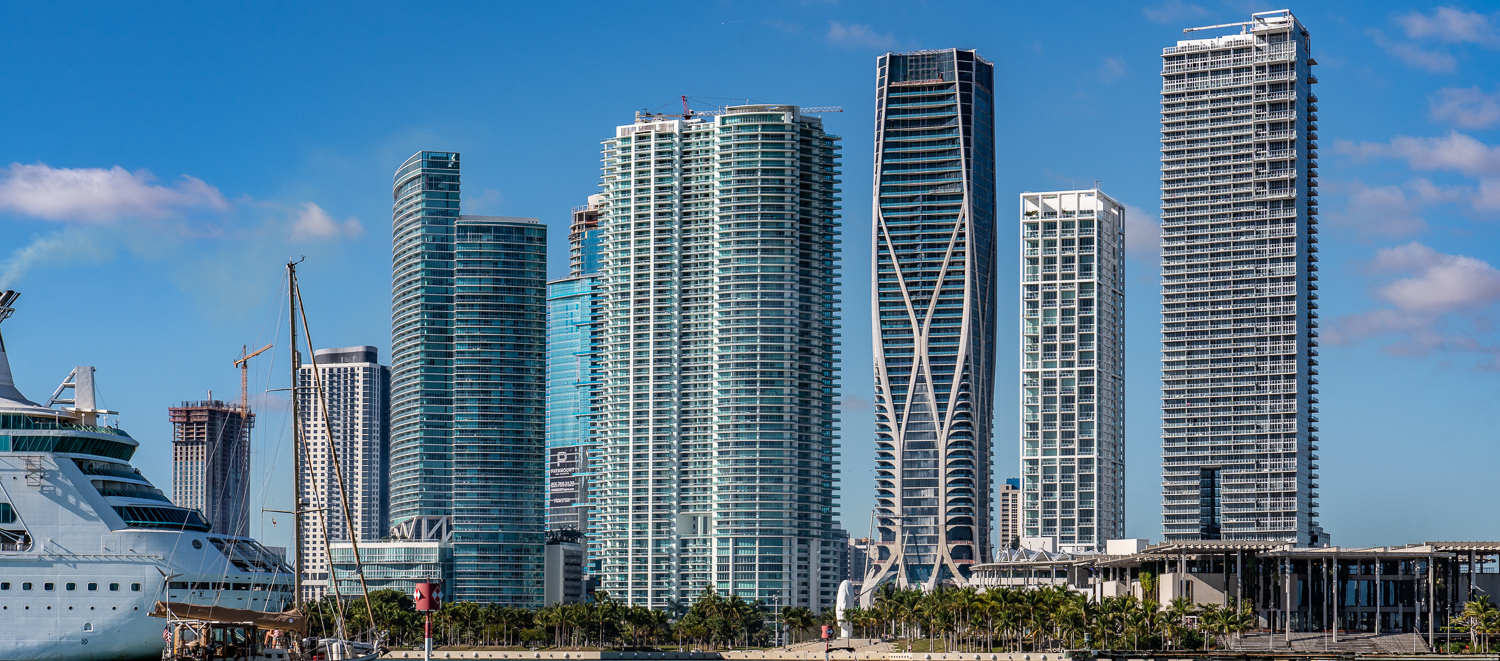
View of Downtown Miami, with 900 Biscayne Bay in the middle.

== See also ==
- List of tallest buildings in Miami
- Downtown Miami
- List of tallest buildings in Florida
