= Matondo =

Matondo is a surname. Notable people with the surname include:

- Rabbi Matondo (born 2000), Welsh footballer
- Rosalie Matondo (born 1963), Republic of the Congo agronomist
- Sita-Taty Matondo (born 1984), Canadian soccer player

== See also ==
- Jeanvion Yulu-Matondo (born 1986), Belgian footballer
