= François Ibovi =

Congolese politician

François Ibovi is a Congolese politician who held a succession of key posts in the government of Congo-Brazzaville beginning in 1997. Closely associated with President Denis Sassou Nguesso, he was Minister of Communication from 1997 to 2002, Minister of Territorial Administration from 2002 to 2007, First Vice-President of the National Assembly from 2007 to 2012, and Minister of Health from 2012 to 2016.

== Political career ==
An ethnic Mbochi, Ibovi was born in Edou, located in the Oyo District of Cuvette Region, in the north of the country; Edou is also the birthplace of President Denis Sassou Nguesso. He studied journalism in the Soviet Union in the 1970s; after returning, he became a leader of the Union of Congolese Socialist Youth and joined the Congolese Labour Party (PCT) in 1977. He worked on national television as a journalist during the 1980s, and he was first elected to the National Assembly in the June–July 1992 parliamentary election as a candidate in Oyo constituency.

During the June–October 1997 civil war, Ibovi was a spokesman for Sassou Nguesso. After Sassou Nguesso returned to power in October 1997, Ibovi was appointed as Minister of Communication and Government Spokesman on 2 November 1997. When rebels loyal to Bernard Kolelas attempted to seize Brazzaville, the capital, in December 1998, Ibovi denied Kolelas' claim that his forces were effectively in control of the city, saying that Kolelas was delusional and that the army had the upper hand. In the government named on 12 January 1999, he remained Minister of Communication and Government Spokesman and was additionally assigned responsibility for relations with Parliament.

In the May–June 2002 parliamentary election, Ibovi was elected to the National Assembly as the PCT candidate for Oyo constituency; he was the only candidate and won the seat in the first round with 100% of the vote. The elections held in 2002 concluded the transitional process begun in 1997, and Sassou Nguesso formally declared that the transition was over on 9 August 2002. On that occasion, Ibovi said that conditions in Congo-Brazzaville had improved greatly since 1997, progressing from a "chaotic situation ... to a calm and livable country". Ibovi remained in the government after the election; on 18 August 2002, he was appointed as Minister of Territorial Administration and Decentralization, in which position he served for over five years.

Criticism of problems in the conduct of the first round of the June–August 2007 parliamentary election led Ibovi to suspend the Director General for Electoral Affairs, Armand Baboutila, on 28 June 2007 for alleged negligence in the handling of the election; he appointed Gaston Ololo in Baboutila's place for the second round of the election. Hervé Ambroise Malonga, acting as spokesman for parties calling for a boycott of the election, said that higher level officials should take responsibility and called for the resignation of Ibovi and the president of the electoral commission.

Ibovi was again elected to the National Assembly as a PCT candidate from Oyo constituency in the 2007 parliamentary election, receiving 99% of the vote. When the National Assembly opened for its new parliamentary term on 4 September 2007, Ibovi was elected as its First Vice-President; he received 122 votes from the 129 deputies who voted. Having been elected to a post in the Bureau of the National Assembly, it was inevitable that Ibovi would be dismissed from his powerful post in the government; some believed that President Sassou Nguesso was demoting Ibovi as punishment for his widely criticized management of the election. Ibovi was eventually replaced as Minister of Territorial Administration by Raymond Mboulou in the government named on 30 December 2007.

At the PCT's Sixth Extraordinary Congress, held in July 2011, Ibovi was re-elected to the PCT's 51-member Political Bureau. In the July–August 2012 parliamentary election, Denis-Christel Sassou Nguesso—the President's son—stood as the PCT's candidate in Oyo, rather than Ibovi. Ibovi was thus left without a seat in the National Assembly, but President Sassou Nguesso appointed him to the government as Minister of Health and Population on 25 September 2012.

On 31 May 2013, Ibovi announced a new anti-tobacco law that was intended to eliminate smoking in public places, ban the advertising of tobacco products, and prevent children, as well as pregnant women and those suffering from mental illness, from buying or using tobacco products. The announcement of the 2012 law was timed to coincide with World No Tobacco Day.

Ibovi visited Cuba on 20–25 June 2013, saying that there was much to learn from Cuba's health system. While there, he signed an agreement that would involve 14 Cuban doctors being sent to Congo-Brazzaville. He also met with Cuban President Raúl Castro, giving him a letter from President Sassou Nguesso, and visited medical facilities. He visited Cuba again on 25–31 October 2013, and on that occasion he signed agreements with the Cuban industrial group Labiofam as part of a strategy to combat malaria. The agreements involved the construction of a pesticide factory and providing biological larvicides to Congo-Brazzaville.

In response to the outbreak of Ebola virus in West Africa in 2014, a plan to cope with any possible spread of the virus to Congo was developed by the government. On 30 September 2014, Ibovi thanked the Chinese government for providing substantial assistance to help prevent any Ebola outbreak in Congo and spoke warmly about the good relationship between the two countries.

After Sassou Nguesso's victory in the March 2016 presidential election, Ibovi was dismissed from the government on 30 April 2016. Jacqueline Lydia Mikolo succeeded Ibovi at the Ministry of Health on 6 May.
