= Edou =

- Location in the Republic of the Congo
- Coordinates: 1°6′51″S 15°57′28″E
- Country: Republic of the Congo
- Department: Cuvette
- District: Oyo

Edou is a small town in Oyo District in the Cuvette Department of the Republic of Congo.

The current President, Denis Sassou-Nguesso, was born in Edou in 1943 as was politician François Ibovi in 1954.
