= Gabriel Oba-Apounou =

Congolese politician

Gabriel Oba-Apounou (born 28 January 1945) is a Congolese politician. During the single-party rule of the Congolese Labour Party (PCT), he was First Secretary of the Congolese Socialist Youth Union; he also served in the government of Congo-Brazzaville as Minister of Youth from 1979 to 1985, Minister of Agriculture from 1985 to 1989, and as Minister of State for Youth and Rural Development from 1989 to 1991. Later, he was First Vice-President of the National Assembly from 2002 to 2007, and he has been a member of the Senate since 2008.

== Political career ==
A native of Oyo, he belongs to the Mbochi tribe. He is also a cousin of Congolese president Denis Sassou Nguesso. After completing high school in 1963, he moved to Brazzaville to pursue physical education studies. He quickly earned his certificate and started teaching physical education in Brazzaville.

To avoid being recruited into the army like many of his peers at the time, he moved back up north in 1965 and settled in Impfondo where he continued to teach physical education. Upon his return to Brazzaville in 1969, he immediately joined the Congolese Labour Party (Parti Congolais du Travail, PCT), newly founded by Captain Marien Ngouabi. His remarkable public speaking skills enabled him to quickly rise through the party's ranks. The following year he was appointed chief of district in Abala in the Plateaux department. In 1979 he was elected leader of the Union of the Congolese Socialist Youth (Union de la Jeunesse Socialiste Congolaise, UJSC), the youth wing of the PCT. That same year, Oba-Apounou was admitted to the PCT Central Committee, and appointed to the cabinet as Minister of Youth; his ministerial portfolio was expanded to include sport in 1984. He was dismissed from the cabinet in December 1985, but he remained on the Secretariat of the PCT Central Committee. He was admitted to the PCT Political Bureau (where he was assigned responsibility for the youth) in 1989, in addition to serving as Secretary of the PCT Central Committee for the Youth. On 13 August 1989, he was appointed to the government as Minister of State for Youth and Rural Development, holding that post until 1991.

After Pascal Lissouba defeated Sassou-Nguesso in the 1992 presidential elections, Oba-Apounou remained neutral for much of the 1990s. But out of loyalty to Sassou Nguesso, he refused to work for the Lissouba administration. He was later rewarded for his loyalty. In 1998, just months after Sassou-Nguesso's return to power at the end of a brief but bloody civil war, Oba-Apounou was appointed as President of the Defense and Security Commission of the National Council of Transition (Conseil National de Transition, CNT—the country's legislature from 1998 to 2002). In 2001, he was elected president of the PCT for the city of Brazzaville and joined Sassou Nguesso's campaign ahead of the 2002 presidential election.

In the May–June 2002 parliamentary election, Oba-Apounou was elected to the National Assembly as the PCT candidate in the Abala constituency of Plateaux Region; he won the seat in the first round, receiving 73.63% of the vote. Rumors predicted that he would become the next Mayor of Brazzaville, but he was instead elected as First Vice-President of the National Assembly on August 10, 2002. Oba-Apounou was also assigned responsibility for the National Assembly's relations with the African Parliamentary Assembly on August 23, 2002.

Oba-Apounou served as First Vice-President of the National Assembly until the end of the parliamentary term in 2007. He ran again in the June–August 2007 parliamentary election as the PCT candidate in Abala, facing Minister of Higher Education Henri Ossébi and an independent candidate, Joseph Mbossa. Oba-Apounou placed first in the first round, receiving 40.21% of the vote against 32.55% for Ossébi, and he therefore faced Ossébi in a second round. Ossébi prevailed in the second round, receiving 58.26% of the vote.

In February 2008 Oba-Apounou was elected as head of the departmental coordination of the Rally of the Presidential Majority (RMP)—the coalition supporting Sassou Nguesso—in Brazzaville. He held that post at the time of the June 2008 local elections. In the August 2008 Senate election, Oba-Apounou was elected to the Senate as an RMP candidate in Plateaux Department, receiving 59 out of 61 possible votes. He was then elected as President of the Senate's Foreign Affairs and Cooperation Committee on 29 August 2008.

Oba-Apounou was eventually succeeded as President of the PCT's Brazzaville Federation by Gabriel Ondongo in March 2014. Although he wanted to keep his post, the party leadership insisted that he step down. The decision to replace him was attributed to a desire for renewal in leadership posts, and PCT Secretary-General Pierre Ngolo spoke warmly of Oba-Apounou's experience and wisdom.

Oba-Apounou was re-elected to the Senate in October 2014 as a PCT candidate in Plateaux, receiving 60 out of 61 possible votes. When the Senate met later in the month, he was retained in his post as President of the Foreign Affairs Commission.

Due to his years as the leader of the UJSC, Oba-Apounou remains a very popular figure. Known as "Ya Gaby" ("Ya" meaning elder), many remember him coming to the rescue of college students who did not get their student stipends on time. He was also responsible for granting scholarships to thousands of students and sending them overseas to study.

== Real estate and business ==
Since joining the civil service, Oba-Apounou has heavily invested into real estate. In addition to building over twenty private residences, he also owns the Exaunel hotel chain. He was inspired to start the business in 1999, when Brazzaville was preparing to host the annual FESPAM music festival but had insufficient accommodation venues. Oba-Apounou redesigned one of his many residences and turned it into what would be the first Exaunel hotel. He has since built four additional hotels.
