= Jean-Pierre Nonault =

Congolese politician and diplomat

- Born: March 23, 1937; Sibiti, Lékoumou Department, Republic of the Congo
- Died: January 25, 2024 (aged 86); Aubervilliers, Seine-Saint-Denis Department, France
- Occupations: Congolese politician and diplomat

Jean-Pierre Nonault (23 March 1937 – 25 January 2024) was a Congolese politician and diplomat. He was Congo-Brazzaville's Ambassador to the Soviet Union from 1974 to 1979 and Ambassador to France from 1979 to 1984. Since 2002, he has been a member of the Senate of Congo-Brazzaville.

== Personal life ==
Nonault's daughter, Arlette Soudan-Nonault is a former journalist and serves as the Republic of Congo's Minister of Tourism and Environment.

== Diplomatic and political career ==
Nonault was born in Lékoumou Department in the southern part of the Republic of the Congo, also known as Congo-Brazzaville. In 1971, under the single-party regime of the Congolese Labour Party (PCT), he became government commissar of Kouilou Region. He was appointed as Director of the Congolese Information Agency on 13 November 1973. In 1974, President Marien Ngouabi appointed Nonault as Congo-Brazzaville's Ambassador to the Soviet Union; he presented his credentials as ambassador in September 1974. He was additionally accredited as Ambassador to Mongolia, presenting his credentials on 25 March 1976, and as Ambassador to Hungary, presenting his credentials on 28 April 1976.

Nonault was elected to the PCT Central Committee in 1979. He was then appointed as Ambassador to France, presenting his credentials to President Giscard d'Estaing on 25 October 1979. While residing in Paris, Nonault was also accredited as Ambassador to the United Kingdom beginning on 23 June 1980 and as Ambassador to Spain. Nonault remained at his post in Paris for over four years; he returned to Congo-Brazzaville in 1984 and took up the post of Secretary-General of the Ministry of Foreign Affairs. At the PCT's Third Ordinary Congress, held on 27–31 July 1984, he was re-elected to the PCT Central Committee.

In July 2002, Nonault was elected to the Senate as a PCT candidate in Cuvette Region, and he was designated as President of the Parliamentary Group of the United Democratic Forces and Allies in October 2002. He was also President of the Collective of Cuvette Senators. He was re-elected to the Senate in October 2005 as a PCT candidate in Cuvette Region. He received the votes of 56 electors, placing first and therefore winning the first of Cuvette's six available seats. As the oldest senator, Nonault presided over the election of the Senate bureau for the new term, an honor customarily reserved for the eldest member of the body, when the Senate resumed meeting on 10 October 2005.

Following the August 2008 Senate election, Nonault—still the oldest senator—again presided over the election of the Senate's bureau on 12 August 2008. The bureau from the previous Senate term was re-elected with only a few changes.

In early 2011, Nonault was appointed by the PCT leadership to chair the five-member Preparatory Committee for the PCT's Sixth Extraordinary Congress. At the Sixth Extraordinary Congress, held in July 2011, Nonault presided over the opening ceremony, and he was designated as President of the PCT's National Control and Evaluation Commission.

In the October 2011 Senate election, Nonault was re-elected to the Senate as a PCT candidate in Cuvette.
