= Clotilde Ngouabi =

First Lady of the Republic of the Congo
- In office 1 January 1969 – 18 March 1972
- President: Marien Ngouabi
- Preceded by: Marie Massamba-Debat
- Succeeded by: Céline Ngouabi

Personal details
- Born: Clotilde Martin; 4 June 1940 Walscheid, France
- Died: 30 October 2019 (aged 79) Strasbourg, France
- Spouse: Marien Ngouabi
- Children: 2

Clotilde Ngouabi née Martin (4 June 1940 – 30 October 2019) was a French-born public figure who served as the first First Lady of the Republic of the Congo from 1969 to 1972, as the wife of President Marien Ngouabi.

== Biography ==
Martin was born in Walscheid, France. Her father Jean-Baptiste Martin was the lumberjack in the region. After the municipal school, she joined the Troisfontaines glass factory as a worker, before moving to Strasbourg. There she met young Marien Ngouabi, a Congolese student at the Saint-Cyr Special Military School. They married in 1962 and moved to Congo where Ngouabi, promoted to lieutenant, took up his post in the Congolese army before becoming the third president of the Republic of Congo in 1968, and Martin became the First Lady.
