= Arlette Soudan-Nonault =

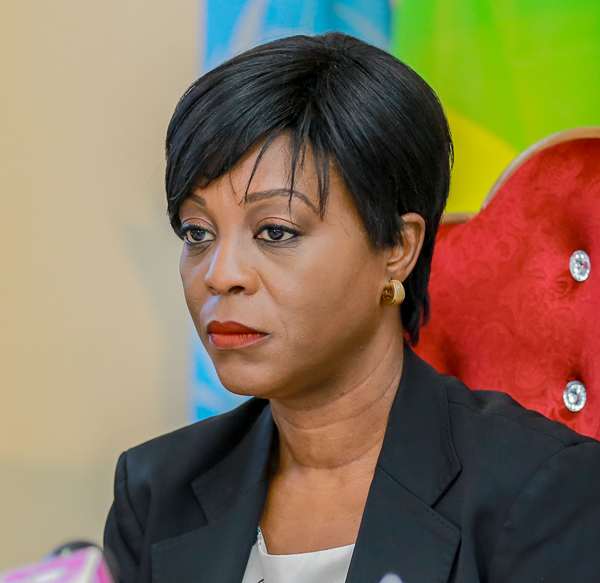
- Soudan-Nonault in 2019

Minister of the Environment, Sustainable Development and the Congo Basin
- Incumbent
- Assumed office 2021
- Prime Minister: Anatole Collinet Makosso

Minister of Tourism, Recreation, and Environment
- In office 2017–2021
- Prime Minister: Clément Mouamba

Personal details
- Born: Brazzaville, Republic of Congo
- Party: Congolese Party of Labour
- Parent: Jean-Pierre Nonault (father)
- Occupation: Journalist

Arlette Soudan-Nonault is a Congolese journalist and politician. She serves as Republic of Congo's Minister of Tourism and Environment.

== Early life and career ==
Soudan-Nonault was born in Brazzaville to Senator Jean-Pierre Nonault, who served as Congolese ambassador to France and Russia. She received her education in these countries. She then trained as a journalist. She was a presenter of news programs on Radio Congo as well as produced a number of shows such as Les stratèges du Look and Clin d'oeil d'Arlette Soudan-Nonault. She then served as the press attaché to the President of the Republic of Congo between 1992 and 1997.

She then launched a communication consulting firm. In 2005, she founded a private school Institution Saint François d'Assise in the outskirts of Brazzaville.

On April 30, 2016, Soudan-Nonault was named the Minister of Tourism and Recreation in the Congolese government led by Prime Minister Clément Mouamba. In this role, she is charged with increasing the share of tourism from 3% to 10% by 2021, to help diversify the country's economy away from declining oil revenues. Investments will be made to improve the country's attractiveness to high-end eco-tourists. In August 2017, she took on additional charge of the Ministry of Environment replacing Rosalie Matondo.

Soudan-Nonault is married to journalist François Soudan, who is the managing editor of magazine Jeune Afrique.
