= Congolese Socialist Youth Union =

Congolese Socialist Youth Union UJSC French: Union de la jeunesse socialiste congolaise
- Badge of the UJSC
- Founded: 1969
- Dissolved: 1992
- Headquarters: Brazzaville, People's Republic of the Congo
- Ideology: Communism; Marxism-Leninism
- Mother party: Congolese Party of Labour
- International affiliation: World Federation of Democratic Youth

The Congolese Socialist Youth Union (French: Union de la jeunesse socialiste congolaise, UJSC) was the youth wing of the Congolese Party of Labour (PCT). From 1969 to 1992, it played a major role in disciplining youth party activists and building up their character with Marxist-Leninist ideas.

UJSC members were generally seen as the future leaders of their country. Benefits of membership in the UJSC included government-sponsored scholarships, and a guaranteed position in the civil service upon completion of higher education studies. Since the PCT at that time was essentially socialist, a vast majority of UJSC members studied at universities in the Soviet Union, Eastern Europe and Cuba. The UJSC lost prominence after the PCT lost power in the events of 1991–1992.

Several officials in the current administration of the Republic of the Congo were members of the UJSC. Its most famous leader was Gabriel Oba-Apounou.
