= Jacqueline Lydia Mikolo =

Congolese politician (born 1972)

Jacqueline Lydia Mikolo (born 1972) is a Congolese politician, Minister of Health and Population since May 6, 2016. She was previously Public Procurement and Regulatory Coordinator at the Department of Major Works (2014-2016).

== Political career ==
Jacqueline Lydia Mikolo entered the government by being appointed Minister of Health and Population in the government of Clément Mouamba on April 30, 2016. During the handover on May 6, she congratulated her predecessor François Ibovi for her work accomplished in the ministry, and promised to continue the reforms Ibovi's term had initiated.

At the 69th World Health Assembly, held May 23–28 in Geneva, she presented the Congolese Health Program, entitled "The march towards development", which sets itself as a primary goal to facilitate access to health for the population with inexpensive and quality care over the period 2016-2021. This goes through several achievements such as the establishment of universal health insurance, the construction of general hospitals in all departments, the strengthening of the management of certain diseases or the maintenance of free access to care for certain segments of the population.

Since 2021, she has served in Anatole Collinet Makosso's government.

== Other activities ==
- GAVI, Alternate Member of the Board
