= Bruno Itoua =

Congolese politician

- Born: Bruno Jean-Richard Itoua; 6 October 1956 (age 68); Pointe-Noire
- Education: École Spéciale des Travaux Publics
- Occupation: Politician

Bruno Jean-Richard Itoua (born 6 October 1956) is a Congolese politician who has served in the government of Congo-Brazzaville as Minister of Higher Education since 2016. Previously, he was Director-General of the National Oil Company of Congo (Société Nationale des Pétroles du Congo, SNPC) from 1998 to 2005, Minister of Energy and Hydraulics from 2005 to 2011, and Minister of Scientific Research from 2011 to 2016.

== Career ==
An ethnic Mbochi and a member of the Gamboma clan, Itoua was born in Pointe-Noire but was considered a native of Cuvette Department. He graduated from the École spéciale des travaux publics, a French civil engineering school in Paris, in 1982. During the 1980s, he worked in Congo-Brazzaville at the National Electricity Company and subsequently at the subsidiary oil company Elf-Congo. He held various posts at Elf-Congo from 1985 to 1997.

Under President Denis Sassou Nguesso, Itoua was appointed as Adviser to the President for Hydrocarbons, Mines, Energy, and Hydraulics in 1997, and he was additionally appointed as Director-General of the National Oil Company of Congo (Société Nationale des Pétroles du Congo, SNPC) in April 1998. He was also appointed as a member of the administrative council of Hydro-Congo, the Congolese oil exploration and exploitation company, on 31 December 1999. As head of the state oil company and oil adviser to President Sassou Nguesso, Itoua was considered "one of the country's most powerful men", and he was characterised as "a sort of honorary son" of Sassou Nguesso due to his aunt's friendship with the President.

After seven years at the head of the SNPC, Itoua was appointed to the government as Minister of Energy and Hydraulics on 7 January 2005. Denis Gokana was appointed to replace him at the SNPC. As Minister of Energy and Hydraulics, Itoua was responsible for overseeing some major projects intended to increase the water supply.

Itoua was elected as the President of the Executive Bureau of the Patronage Saint-Anne football club on 16 February 2007. He assumed that position on 5 April.

In the June–August 2007 parliamentary election, Itoua was elected to the National Assembly as the candidate of the ruling Congolese Party of Labour (PCT) for Ollombo I constituency; he won the seat in the first round with 68.71% of the vote, defeating independent candidate Fidèle Bossa and Club 2002-PUR candidate Paud Rock Joseph.

In a minor government reshuffle on 12 December 2011, Itoua switched ministries with Henri Ossébi, becoming Minister of Scientific Research. Itoua stood again as the PCT candidate for Ollombo I constituency in the July–August 2012 parliamentary election; he again won the seat in the first round of voting, receiving 100% of the vote. Following the election, he was retained in his post as Minister of Scientific Research and Technological Innovation in the government named on 25 September 2012.

After Sassou Nguesso's victory in the March 2016 presidential election, he moved Itoua to the post of Minister of Higher Education on 30 April 2016. In the July 2017 parliamentary election, he was re-elected to the National Assembly as the PCT candidate in the first constituency of Ollombo, winning the seat in the first round with 75% of the vote.
