= Walscheid =

- Commune
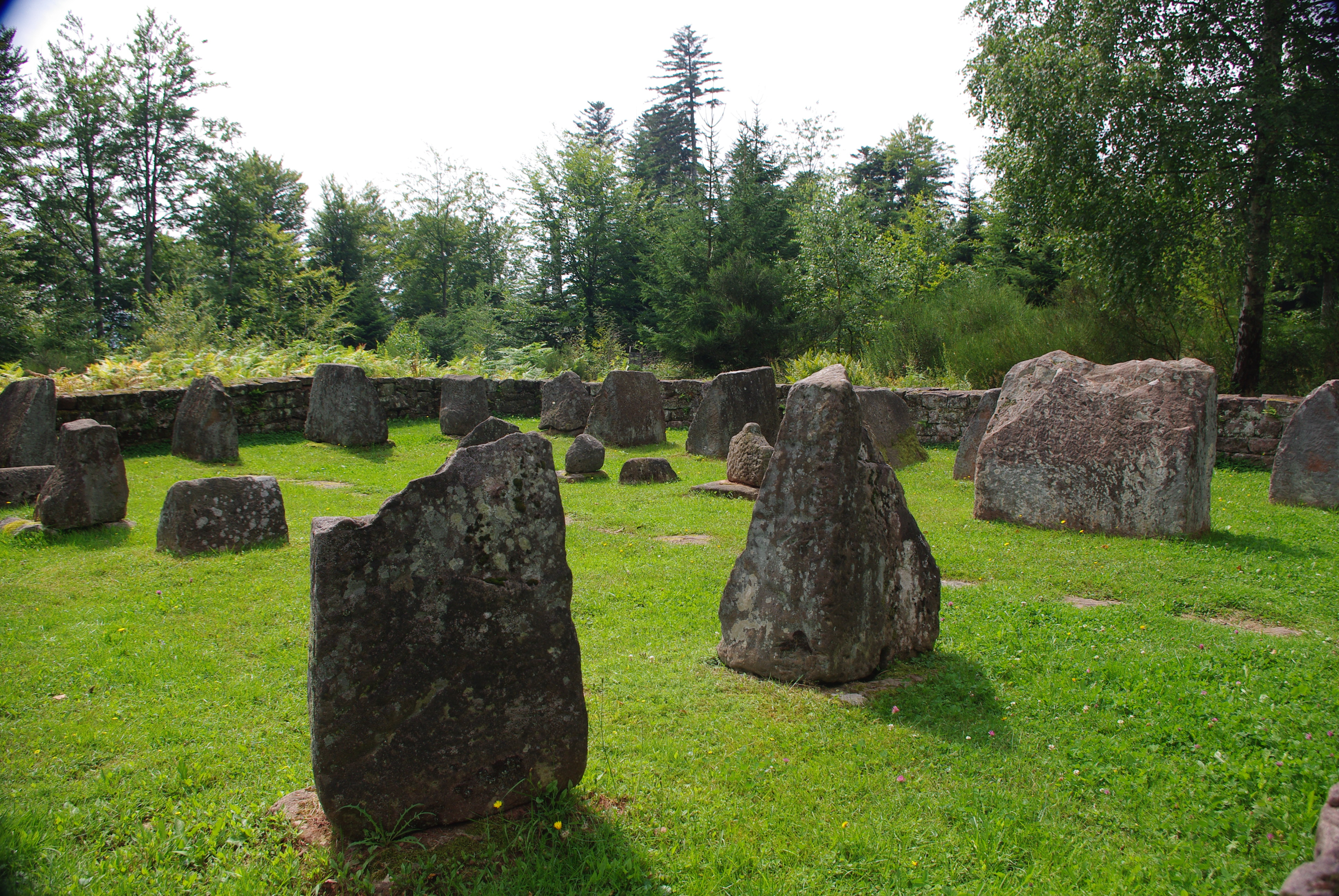
- The Gallo-Roman cemetery in Walscheid

- Coat of arms
- Location of Walscheid
- Location within France Location within Grand Est
- Coordinates: 48°39′17″N 7°09′03″E
- Country: France
- Region: Grand Est
- Department: Moselle
- Arrondissement: Sarrebourg-Château-Salins
- Canton: Phalsbourg
- Intercommunality: Sarrebourg-Moselle Sud

Government
  - Mayor (2020–2026): Michel Schiby
- Area^{1}: 38.35 km^{2} (14.81 sq mi)
- Highest elevation: 983 m (3,225 ft)
- Lowest elevation: 294 m (965 ft)
- Population (2023): 1,459
  - Density: 38.04/km^{2} (98.53/sq mi)
- Time zone: UTC+01:00 (CET)
  - Summer (DST): UTC+02:00 (CEST)
- INSEE/Postal code: 57742 /57870
- ^{1} French Land Register data, which excludes lakes, ponds, glaciers > 1 km^{2} (0.386 sq mi or 247 acres) and river estuaries.

Walscheid (French pronunciation: [valʃaid]; Lorraine Franconian: Wolscheid) is a commune in the Moselle department of Grand Est in north-eastern France.

== Population ==
Historical population
Year	Pop.	±% p.a.
1968	1,709	—
1975	1,742	+0.27%
1982	1,676	−0.55%
1990	1,624	−0.39%
1999	1,621	−0.02%
2007	1,645	+0.18%
2012	1,609	−0.44%
2017	1,536	−0.92%
2023	1,459	−0.85%
Source: INSEE

== Notable people ==
- Clotilde Ngouabi (1940–2019), French-born First Lady of the Republic of the Congo (1969 - 1972)

== See also ==
- Communes of the Moselle department
