= André-Raphaël Loemba =

Congolese politician (RC)

André-Raphael Loemba is a Republic of the Congo politician, who served as Minister of Hydrocarbons from 15 September 2009 to 10 August 2015.

He was superseded at this position by Jean-Marc Thystère-Tchicaya.
