= Ingrid Ebouka-Babackas =

Congolese politician

Minister of Planning, Statistics and Regional Integration
- Incumbent
- Assumed office May 5, 2016

Personal details
- Born: Ingrid Olga Ghislaine Ebouka-Babackas

Ingrid Olga Ghislaine Ebouka-Babackas is a Congolese politician. She is Minister of Planning, Statistics and Regional Integration since May 7, 2016. She was previously Director General of National Financial Institutions at the Ministry of Economy, Finance, Budget and Public Portfolio.

== Early life and education ==
Born Ingrid Olga Ghislaine Ebouka-Babackas, she is the daughter of the former Minister of Finance Édouard Ebouka-Babackas. After studying finance in Paris, France, she returned to the Congo.

== Career ==
After her return, Ebouka-Babackas worked in several financial institutions, including the International Bank of Congo and the Central African Banking Commission (2001–2011). She was subsequently a member of the National Credit Council, the National Monetary and Financial Committee and the Central African Financial Stability Committee.

Later, Ebouka-Babackas was appointed Director General of National Financial Institutions at the Ministry of Economy, Finance, Budget and Public Portfolio. On the occasion of the 2016 presidential election, she was part of Denis Sassou-Nguesso's National Campaign team.

Following Sassou-Nguesso's re-election, Ebouka-Babackas was appointed Minister of Planning, Statistics and Regional Integration on April 30, 2016 in the government of Clément Mouamba, succeeding Léon Raphaël Mokoko. During the transfer of power on 7 May, she mentioned that she was committed to creating the most reliable national statistics.

== Other activities ==
- Joint World Bank-IMF Development Committee, Member (since 2022)
- African Development Bank (AfDB), Ex-Officio Member of the Board of Governors (since 2016)
- Multilateral Investment Guarantee Agency (MIGA), World Bank Group, Ex-Officio Member of the Board of Governors (since 2016)
- World Bank, Ex-Officio Member of the Board of Governors (since 2016)
