= Société Nationale des Pétroles du Congo =

National oil company

Société nationale des pétroles du Congo
- Industry: oil and gas industry
- Founded: 1998
- Headquarters: Republic of the Congo
- Key people: Raoul Maixent Ominga(DG) Sébastien Brice Poaty (SG)
- Products: petroleum
- Owner: Government of the Republic of the Congo
- Subsidiaries: Congolaise de Raffinage, SNPC D, SFP, Sonarep, Ilogs

Société nationale des pétroles du Congo (the National Petroleum Company of the Congo, SNPC) is the national oil company of the Republic of the Congo. The company was established in 1998 after the dissolution of the public company Hydro-Congo. The company manages government-owned shares of production from oil fields in the country. The company has stakes in Moho-Bilondo (15%), Nkossa (15%), M'Boundi (8.8%), Kitina (35%), Sendji (15%), Yanga (15%), Djambala (35%), Foukanda (35%), Mwafi (35%), Emeraude (49%), Yombo (44%), Tilapia (35%), Azurite (15%), and Turquoise Marine-1 (15%) fields. It owns the refinery company named Congolaise de Raffinage (CORAF).
