= Antoinette Sassou Nguesso =

First Lady of the Republic of the Congo

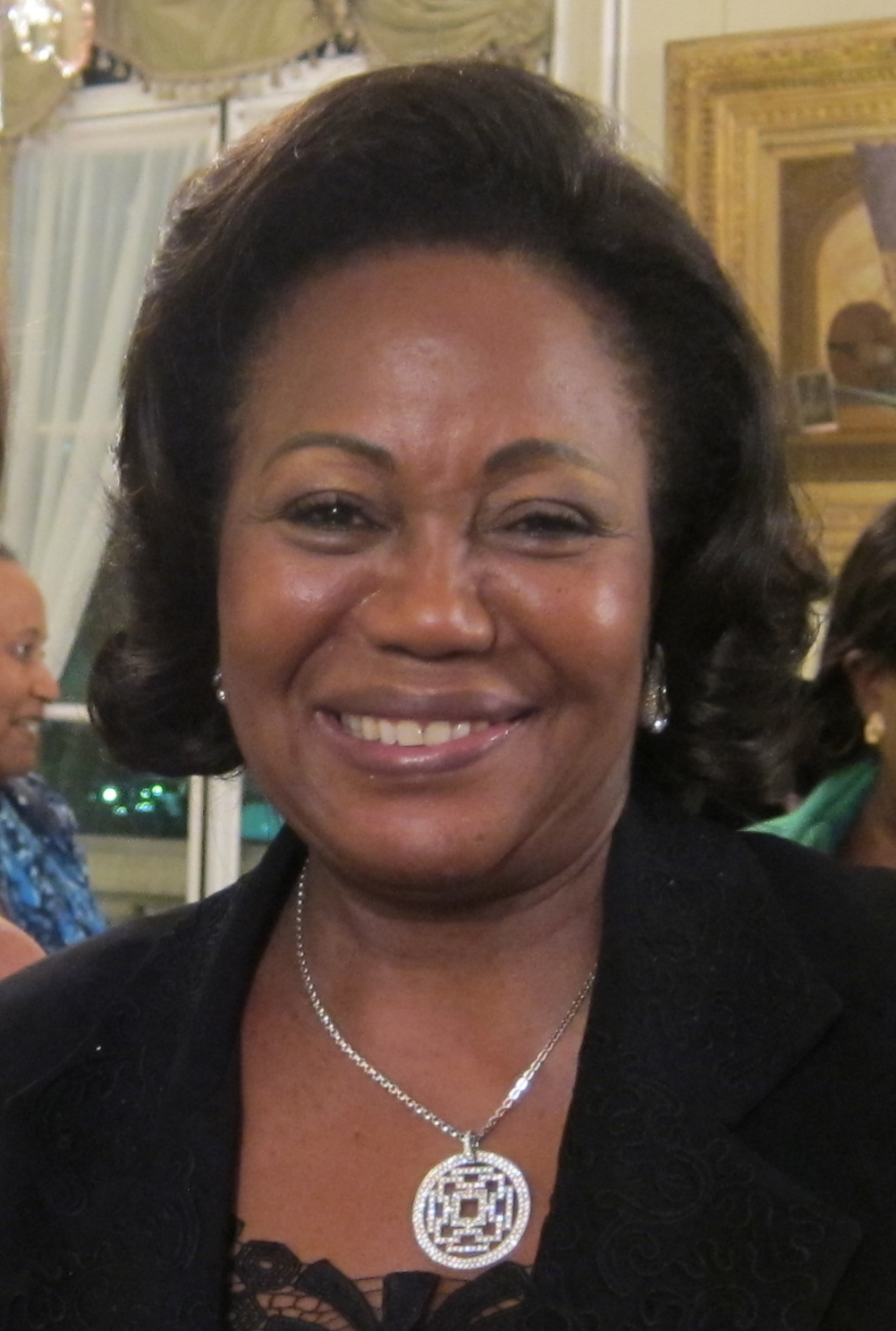
- Sassou Nguesso in 2011

First Lady of the Republic of the Congo
- Current
- Assumed role 31 August 1997
- President: Denis Sassou Nguesso
- Preceded by: Jocelyne Lissouba
- In role 8 February 1979 – 31 August 1992
- President: Denis Sassou Nguesso
- Preceded by: Marie-Noëlle Yhombi-Opango
- Succeeded by: Jocelyne Lissouba

First Lady of African Union
- In role 24 January 2006 – 24 January 2007
- President: Denis Sassou Nguesso
- Preceded by: Stella Obasanjo (2005)
- Succeeded by: Theresa Kufuor

Personal details
- Born: Antoinette Loemba Tchibota; 7 May 1945 (age 80) Brazzaville, French Congo
- Party: Congolese Party of Labour
- Spouse: Denis Sassou Nguesso (m. 1969)

Antoinette Sassou Nguesso (née Tchibota; born 7 May 1945) is a Congolese retired teacher and public figure who became the First Lady of the Republic of the Congo in 1997 as the wife of President Denis Sassou Nguesso. She had also been First Lady from 1979 to 1992 during her husband's first presidential tenure.

== Biography ==
Sassou Nguesso was born Antoinette Loemba Tchibota on 7 May 1941, in Brazzaville to Pascal Loemba Tchibota and Marie-Louise Djembo. Her parents, who were originally from Kakamoéka, divorced when she was a child. Her mother later remarried to her second husband, François Gallo Poto, a cousin of the Antoinette Gbetigbia Gogbe Yetene (d. 1977), first wife of Mobutu Sese Seko, the President of Zaire. Sassou Nguesso's mother, who became known as Mama Poto Galo, died in January 2005 and was buried in Gombe Cemetery in Kinshasa in the neighboring Democratic Republic of Congo. Following her parents' divorce, Sassou Nguesso was raised in both Pointe-Noire and Brazzaville. She attended elementary school in both cities, before enrolling in a girl's college in Mouyondzi.

Sassou Nguesso is a retired teacher. Sassou Nguesso has been president of a Congolese NGO, the Congo Assistance Foundation (la Fondation Congo Assistance), since its establishment on 7 May 1984.

The first lady routinely travels with her personal hairdresser, the Brazzaville-based stylist Amédée Ebono, on all official trips.

In June 2016, Sassou Nguesso was subpoenaed to appear in an American court while traveling in Washington D.C. The case stems from an ongoing 1980 debt dispute between the American company Commisimpex and the Congolese government under President Denis Sassou Nguesso. The company maintains that it was never compensated for its work by the Sassou Nguesso government. Antoinette Sassou Nguesso was summoned to the U.S. court to answer questions regarding her family's assets, as well as government finances; she ignored the subpoena and did not appear in court. Her lawyers invoked diplomatic immunity, and did not understand why she was summoned about affairs of the Congolese state.

As of 2017 Sassou Nguesso's family remained the subject of several legal and financial investigations in the U.S. and France. The French Ministry of Justice seized a real estate complex located in the 17th arrondissement of Paris that had been purchased in Antoinette Sassou Nguesso's name.
