= Rosalie Matondo =

Congolese politician and agronomist (b. 1963)

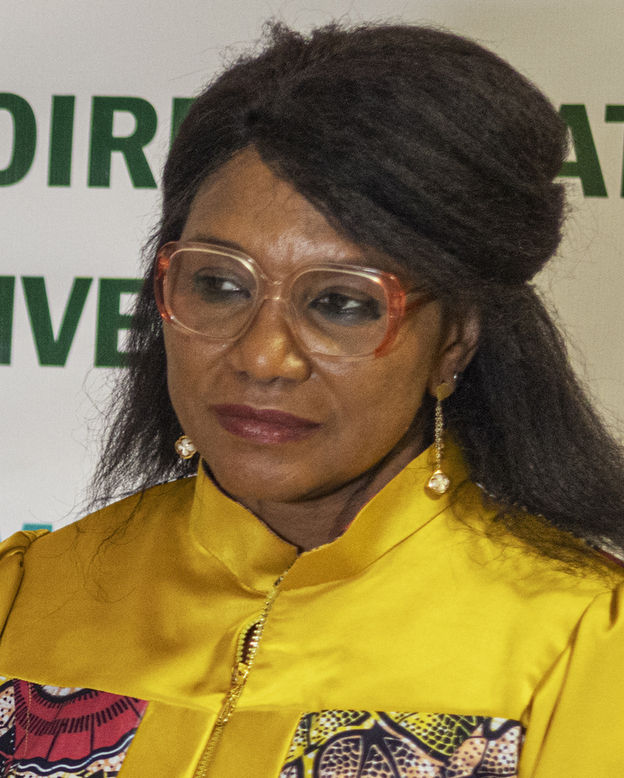

Minister of Forest Economy
- Incumbent
- Assumed office 2021
- Prime Minister: Anatole Collinet Makosso

Personal details
- Born: April 18, 1963 (age 63) N'Djamena, Chad
- Education: Lycée de la Révolution; Bulgarian Academy of Sciences

Rosalie Matondo (born April 18, 1963, in N'Djamena, Chad) is a Congolese agronomist and minister of the Forest Economy since May 7, 2016. She was previously coordinator of the "National Program of Afforestation and Reforestation" (PRONAR) within the same Ministry (2011–2016), as well as adviser to the head of state (2013–2016).

== Biography ==
=== Early life and education ===
Rosalie Matondo was born 18 April 1963 in N'Djamena (then known as Fort-Lamy) in Chad. She then studied at the Lycée de la Révolution where she obtained a bachelor's degree (series D) in 1983. She then enrolled at the Bulgarian Academy of Sciences, where she studied at the Department of Genetics of the Higher Institute of Science agronomy at Plovdiv. In 1989 she obtained the higher diploma in agronomist engineering. Then, in 1993, she obtained the diploma of agronomic sciences in plant biotechnology from the Institute of Genetic Engineering at the same academy.

=== Career in agronomy ===
In 1994, she returned to Congo to join a vitro culture laboratory, hitherto led by French and English researchers, who had to leave Brazzaville because of the civil war. In particular, she cultivated tropical plants. In 1995, she joined the French Center for Agricultural Research for Development (CIRAD) as a researcher in forestry. She also joined the National School of Forest Administration (ENSAF - former Institute of Rural Development), where she worked as a teacher-researcher. In 2007, she was placed at the head of the national reforestation service. Since 2021, she has served as the Minister of Forest Economy.

=== Political career ===
In January 2013, Rosalie Matondo was appointed counsellor to Congolese president Denis Sassou-Nguesso, as well as head of the Department of Forest Economics, Sustainable Development, Environment and Quality of Life.

On April 30, 2016, she joined the Congolese government as Minister of Forestry Economy, Sustainable Development, and Environment, replacing Henri Djombo, who had held the position for 18 years. The handover took place on May 7.

In June 2016, as part of World Environment Day, she urged the Congolese to become more involved in the fight against environmental degradation and deforestation, encouraging them, inter alia, to focus on the use of clay "furnished homes" to reduce wood and coal consumption. It also denounced the illegal trade in protected species.

== Distinction ==
- Commander in the Order of Congolese Merit (2016)

== Publications ==
- Rosalie Safou-Matondo, Jean-Pierre Bouillet, Jean-Paul Laclau, Jean de Dieu Nzila, Jacques Ranger and Philippe Deleporte, "For sustainable production of eucalyptus plantations in the Congo: fertilization", Timber and Forests of the Tropics, No. 279, 2004, pp. 23–35
- Rosalie Safou-Matondo, Philippe Deleporte, Jean-Paul Laclau and Jean-Pierre Bouillet, "Hybrid and clonal variability of nutrient content and nutrient use efficiency in Eucalyptus stands in Congo", Forest Ecology and Management, no. 210, 2005, p. 193-204
