= Denis-Christel Sassou Nguesso =

Congolese politician (born 1975)

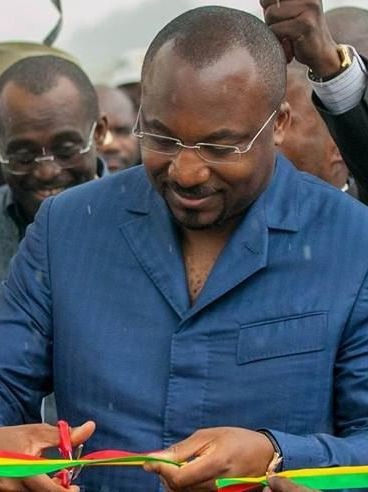
- Sassou Nguesso in 2018

Minister for International Cooperation and the Promotion of Public-Private Partnership
- Incumbent
- Assumed office 21 May 2021
- Prime Minister: Anatole Collinet Makosso

Deputy of the National Assembly for Oyo
- Incumbent
- Assumed office 5 September 2012
- Preceded by: François Ibovi

Personal details
- Born: Denis-Christel Sassou Nguesso; 14 January 1975 (age 51) Brazzaville, People's Republic of the Congo
- Party: Congolese Party of Labour
- Spouse: Danièle Sassou Nguesso
- Parent(s): Denis Sassou-Nguesso; Lily Kaniki

Denis-Christel Sassou Nguesso (born 14 January 1975) is a Congolese politician. He is the son of President of Congo-Brazzaville Denis Sassou Nguesso. Denis Christel was administrator-general of Cotrade and was subsequently appointed deputy director-general of the National Petroleum Company of the Congo (Société nationale des pétroles du Congo, SNPC) in December 2010. He was elected to the National Assembly of Congo-Brazzaville in 2012.

== Early life and career ==
Denis-Christel Sassou Nguesso was born in Brazzaville on 14 January 1975. He attended the Général-Leclerc military preparatory school in Brazzaville and subsequently studied in France. Beginning in 2001, he headed the SNPC's branch in the United Kingdom. Subsequently, he was administrator-general of Cotrade, a Congolese state company responsible for marketing oil, from 2005 to 2009. As part of an administrative shake-up at the SNPC, Sassou Nguesso was instead appointed as deputy director-general of the SNPC, in charge of the downstream operations, on 29 December 2010. The shake-up was viewed as indicative of his "increasing influence".

== Political activities ==
Beginning in 2005, Sassou Nguesso headed the Pole of Young Republicans (PJR), a political association that elected eight of its members to the National Assembly as independent candidates in the 2007 parliamentary election. He served as the PJR's honorary president until he was elected as its national executive president on 12 October 2007. The group was later renamed the Party for Justice and the Republic. At the Sixth Extraordinary Congress of the Congolese Labour Party (PCT), held in July 2011, Sassou Nguesso was elected to the PCT's 51-member Political Bureau. 10 PJR members, including Sassou Nguesso, were included in the PCT Central Committee. Sassou Nguesso then dissolved the PJR on 5 August 2011, while calling on all its members to immediately join the PCT.

In the July 2012 parliamentary election, he was elected to the National Assembly as the PCT candidate in Oyo constituency, located in Cuvette Region; he won the seat in the first round of voting, receiving 99.88% of the vote. Three of the four opposing candidates withdrew prior to the vote, and the result was viewed as a foregone conclusion.

Sassou Nguesso's election to the National Assembly was viewed as strengthening his political influence and perhaps paving the way for him to receive a post in the government. As one of the two youngest deputies elected to the National Assembly in the 2012 election, Sassou Nguesso was part of the traditional bureau d'âge, assisting Auguste-Célestin Gongarad Nkoua, the oldest deputy, in presiding over the election of the National Assembly's bureau on 5 September 2012. Despite the speculation that Sassou Nguesso might be appointed to the government and become a de facto political heir to his father, in a manner reminiscent of father–son succession arrangements seen in some nearby countries, he did not receive a post in the government appointed on 25 September 2012.

In November 2013, he initiated a campaign of free cervical cancer vaccinations for girls in Oyo, and his wife, Danièle, donated ophthalmology equipment on his behalf to an Oyo hospital.

Speaking in January 2014, he said that he had no present plans to eventually succeed his father as president, but he also stressed that, as a Congolese citizen, he had "the same duties but also the same rights as my countrymen" and that his name should not disqualify him from office.

Sassou Nguesso was included on his father's campaign team for the March 2016 presidential election and placed in charge of equipment and electoral materials. In the July 2017 parliamentary election, he was re-elected to the National Assembly as the PCT candidate in Oyo, winning the seat in the first round with 99% of the vote.

== Controversies ==
Denis-Christel Sassou Nguesso attracted some negative attention in 2007 for spending heavily on luxury goods and accommodations abroad. British NGO Global Witness published documents including Sassou Nguesso's credit card bills, which showed him spending hundreds of thousands of dollars on shopping sprees in Paris, Dubai and Marbella. According to the documents, on 3 June 2006, Denis Christel spent EUR 10,225 in Louis Vuitton and in August 2006 alone, spent $35,000 on purchases from designers such as Louis Vuitton and Roberto Cavalli.

Sassou Nguesso took Global Witness to court in London for publishing documents which demonstrated lavish spending of state funds. English High Court judge Stanley Burnton dismissed an attempt by Sassou Nguesso to suppress publication of his credit card bills.

The assets of Sassou Nguesso were seized in July 2016 in France and in the United States and the assets of his nominee, Claude Wilfried (Willy) Etoka were also seized in Switzerland.

In 2020, Miami federal prosecutors filed a lawsuit against Denis-Christel Sassou Nguesso for purchasing in 2012 a $2.8 million penthouse at 900 Biscayne Bay in Miami with misappropriated funds. Nguesso allegedly embezzled millions of dollars from Congo's state-owned oil company in what the prosecutors called an "international money laundering conspiracy". U.S. Attorney Adrienne Rosen stated that Nguesso was able to exert his influence over Congo's petroleum industry, being the president's son and deputy manager at Société Nationale des Pétroles du Congo (National Company of Congo Petroleums).

In July 2023, revelations on the judicial investigation against Sassou Nguesso affirms that the investigating judges have got their hands on new incriminating documents while Sassou-Nguesso is accused of having embezzled millions of euros of public money in the so-called "ill-gotten gains" affair. In 2020 and 2022, judges seized two mansions in Paris and Neuilly, luxury accommodation owned by Congolese companies. According to the article, the private mansion of Neuilly which includes seven bedrooms, five bathrooms, a hairdressing salon and a massage parlour, for example, would have cost 6663339900.00 CFA Francs (10 million €).

In 2024, the Dubai Leaks revealed that Sassou Nguesso had invested in a four-bedroom property in Dubai.
