= Congolese embassy =

Congolese embassy may refer to:

- List of diplomatic missions of the Democratic Republic of the Congo
- List of diplomatic missions of the Republic of the Congo
