= Foreign relations of Congo =

Foreign relations of Congo may refer to:

- Foreign relations of the Democratic Republic of the Congo
- Foreign relations of the Republic of the Congo
