= List of diplomatic missions in the Democratic Republic of the Congo =

This is a list of diplomatic missions in the Democratic Republic of the Congo, also known as DR Congo or Congo-Kinshasa. There are currently 60 embassies in Kinshasa.

Other major cities, namely Lubumbashi and Goma, are host to career consular missions and liaison offices.

Honorary consulates are omitted from this listing.

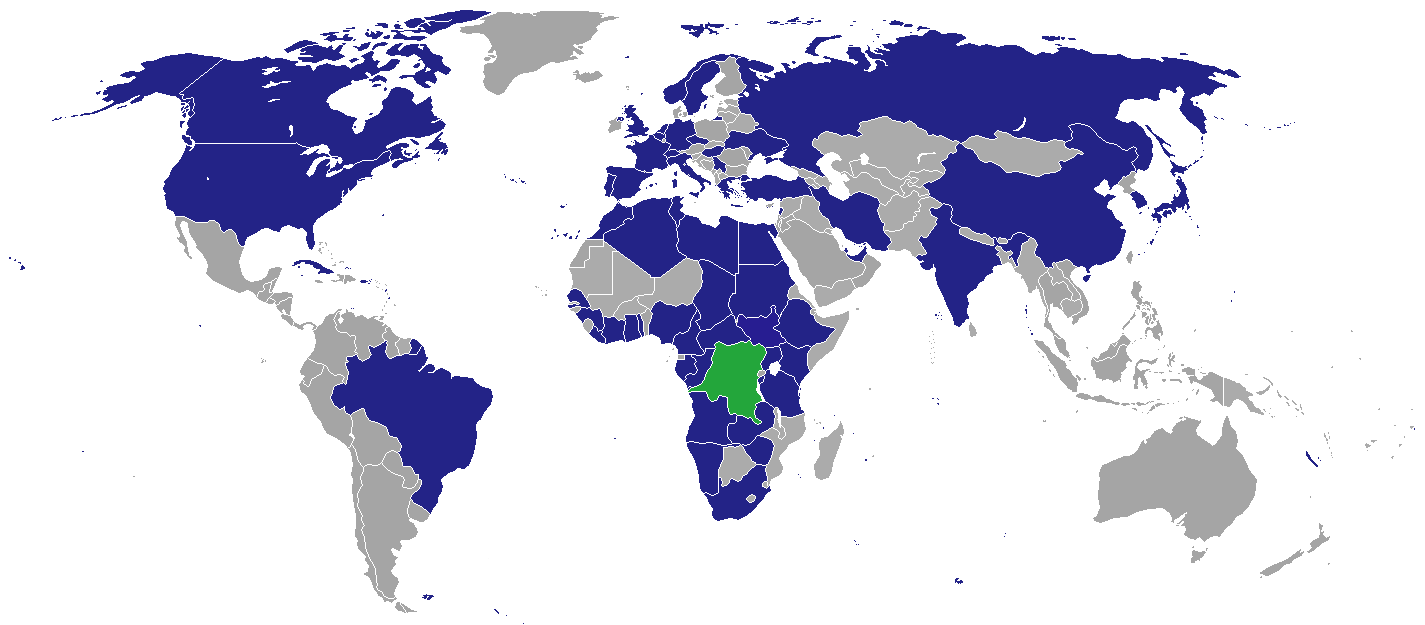
Map of diplomatic missions in DR Congo

== Diplomatic missions in Kinshasa ==
=== Embassies ===
1. Algeria
2. Angola
3. Belgium
4. Brazil
5. Burundi
6. Cameroon
7. Canada
8. Central African Republic
9. Chad
10. China
11. Congo-Brazzaville
12. Cuba
13. Czechia
14. Egypt
15. Ethiopia
16. France
17. Gabon
18. Germany
19. Ghana
20. Greece
21. Guinea
22. Holy See
23. India
24. Iran
25. Italy
26. Ivory Coast
27. Japan
28. Kenya
29. Lebanon
30. Liberia
31. Libya
32. Morocco
33. Namibia
34. Netherlands
35. Nigeria
36. Norway
37. Portugal
38. Qatar
39. Russia
40. Senegal
41. Serbia
42. South Africa
43. South Korea
44. South Sudan
45. Sovereign Military Order of Malta
46. Spain
47. Sudan
48. Sweden
49. Switzerland
50. Tanzania
51. Togo
52. Tunisia
53. Turkey
54. Uganda
55. Ukraine
56. United Arab Emirates
57. United Kingdom
58. United States
59. Zambia
60. Zimbabwe

=== Other missions or delegations ===
1. European Union (Delegation)
2. Hungary (Embassy office)

== Consular missions ==
The cities of Bukavu, Goma, Lubumbashi, and Matadi — all of which are capitals of their respective provinces — are host to career missions. All entries herein are consulates-general, unless otherwise noted.

=== Bukavu, South Kivu ===
1. Burundi

=== Goma, North Kivu ===
1. Kenya
2. Netherlands (Liaison office)
3. Uganda (Liaison office)

=== Lubumbashi, Haut-Katanga ===
1. Angola
2. Belgium
3. Namibia
4. South Africa
5. Tanzania
6. Zambia
7. Zimbabwe (Consulate)

=== Matadi, Kongo Central ===
1. Angola

== Non-resident embassies accredited to Congo-Kinshasa ==
=== Resident in Abuja, Nigeria ===
- Bangladesh
- Mauritania
- Sierra Leone
- Trinidad & Tobago

=== Resident in Dar es Salaam, Tanzania ===
- Ireland
- Slovakia
- Somalia

=== Resident in Luanda, Angola ===
- Israel
- Poland
- Romania
- Vietnam

=== Resident in Lusaka, Zambia ===
- Botswana
- Finland
- Malawi

=== Resident in Nairobi, Kenya ===
- Argentina
- Austria
- Colombia
- Hungary
- Indonesia
- Philippines
- Thailand

=== Resident in other cities ===
- Australia (Harare)
- Chile (New York City)
- Croatia (Paris)
- Denmark (Kampala)
- Eswatini (Maputo)
- Kazakhstan (Addis Ababa)
- Lesotho (Pretoria)
- Malaysia (Windhoek)
- Mali (Brazzaville)
- Mexico (Addis Ababa)
- New Zealand (Addis Ababa)
- Paraguay (Pretoria)
- Peru (Rabat)
- Saudi Arabia (Kampala)
- Seychelles (Pretoria)
- Uruguay (Pretoria)
- Venezuela (Brazzaville)

== Closed missions ==
Host city	Sending country	Mission	Year closed	Ref.
Kinshasa	Argentina	Embassy	1993	
Kinshasa	Austria	Embassy (Note: Resident in Nairobi, Kenya)	1993	
Kinshasa	Benin	Consulate-General (Note: Originally an embassy, was downgraded into a consulate-general in the midst of a reduction of Beninese missions in 2016.)	2019	
Kinshasa	Chile	Embassy	1991	
Kinshasa	East Germany	Embassy	1990	
Kinshasa	Israel	Embassy	2003	
Kinshasa	North Korea	Embassy	2023	
Kinshasa	Poland	Embassy	2008	
Kinshasa	Romania	Embassy	1999	
Bukavu	Belgium	Consulate-General	2008	
Bukavu	United States	Consulate	Unknown	
Goma	Uganda	Consulate	2000	
Goma	United Kingdom	Embassy Office	Unknown	
Kisangani	United States	Consulate	Unknown	
Lubumbashi	France	Consulate	1997	
Lubumbashi	Greece	Consulate General	1995	
Lubumbashi	United States	Consulate	1995	

== See also ==
- Foreign relations of the Democratic Republic of the Congo
- List of diplomatic missions of the Democratic Republic of the Congo
- Visa policy of the Democratic Republic of the Congo
