= India–Republic of the Congo relations =

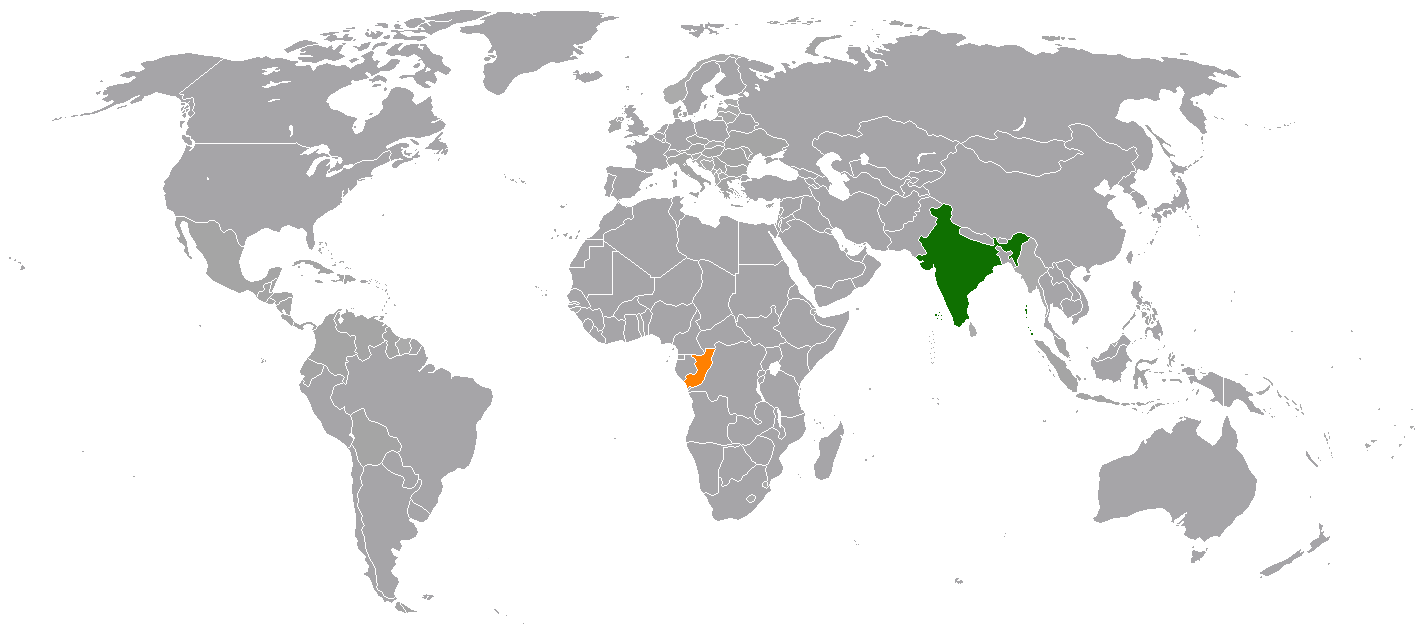
- India: Congo

India–Republic of the Congo relations are the international relations that exist between India and the Congo. Congo maintains an embassy in New Delhi. India opened an embassy in Brazzaville in November 2019.

== History ==
India and the Congo signed a protocol on Foreign Office Consultations on 17 March 2010, and the first Consultations were held in Brazzaville on 21 January 2011. Several ministerial level visits have taken place between the two countries.

India and the Congo were among the first 19 countries to join the International Solar Alliance, proposed by Prime Minister Narendra Modi, on 15 November 2016.

== Trade ==
India was the third largest source for imports to the Congo in 2015. Bilateral trade between India and the Congo totaled US$368.28 million in 2015–16, declining from $618.41 million the previous fiscal. India exported $166.64 million worth of goods to the Congo, and imported $201.64 million in 2015–16. The Congo was the fourth largest African exporter to India in 2008. The main commodities exported by India to the Congo are non-basmati rice, tea, spirits and beverages, power loom fabrics, pharmaceuticals, meat products, household articles of steel, and bicycles. The major commodities imported by India from the Congo are metallic ore, metal scrap, organic chemicals, pearls, semi-precious stones, oil seeds and petroleum.

In June 2010, Bharti Airtel struck a deal to buy Zain's mobile operations in 15 African countries, including the Congo, for $8.97 billion, in India's second biggest overseas acquisition after Tata Steel's US$13 billion buy of Corus in 2007. Bharti Airtel completed the acquisition on 8 June 2010. On 5 November 2013, Airtel entered into an agreement to acquire Warid Congo SA., the Congo subsidiary of the Warid Group, for $70–80 million. The deal made Airtel the largest mobile network operator in the Congo with 2.6 million customers at the time of the acquisition. Ashok Leyland was awarded a contract to supply 200 buses to the Government of Congo.

The Congo was the "focus country" at the 10th CII-EXIM Bank Conclave on India-Africa Project Partnership in New Delhi in March 2014. Congo Industry Minister Isidore Mvouba attended the event and addressed delegates. Mvouba stated that Indian government and industry had already participated in rural electrification, urban transportation and food quality control projects, as well as in sectors like cement and pharmaceuticals in the Congo. He urged Indian firms to "partner the Republic of Congo government in converting the country's comparative advantage in different sectors into competitive strengths" and help the country become an emerging economy by 2025.

Trade between India and Congo
| Year | 2013-14 | 2014-15 | 2015-16 | 2016-17 | 2017-18 | 2018-19 | 2019-20 | 2020-21 April - Feb |
| Exports | 210 | 253 | 167 | 136 | 117 | 124 | 113 | 245 |
| Imports | 90 | 366 | 202 | 157 | 199 | 403 | 587 | 96 |
| Total trade | 300 | 619 | 369 | 293 | 316 | 527 | 700 | 341 |

== Foreign aid ==
The Congolese Government signed a Line of Credit (LOC) agreement worth US$70 million on 19 December 2011, to fund a rural electrification project. India extended an LOC of $89.9 million in 2014 to develop transportation systems in Brazzaville and Pointe Noire. India extended another LOC worth $55 million in the same year for the construction of a greenfield 600 tpd rotary kiln based cement plant.

India donated medicines worth $200,000 in 2010 to Congo, and $500,000 as humanitarian assistance and disaster relief for the victims of a blast at an ordnance depot in Congo on 4 March 2012. India implemented the Pan African e-network project in Congo. Tele-education, Tele-medicine and VVIP connectivity nodes were established in Brazzaville under the project. At the second India Africa Forum Summit, India offered to establish a Rural Technology Park (RTP), a Food Testing Laboratory (FTL), an Agricultural Seed Production-cum-Demonstration Centre (ASPDC), and a Centre for English Language Training (CELT) in Congo. The Government of Congo expressed interest on all the facilities, except the Rural Technology Park.

Citizens of Congo are eligible for scholarships under the Indian Technical and Economic Cooperation Programme and the Indian Council for Cultural Relations. Several officials from Congo have also received training programs under the AIFS.

== Indians in the Congo ==
As of December 2016, around 300 Indians reside in the Congo. They are primarily engaged in trading and the service sector.

== See also ==
- Foreign relations of India
- Foreign relations of the Republic of the Congo
