= List of diplomatic missions in the Republic of the Congo =

This is a list of diplomatic missions in the Republic of the Congo, also known as Congo-Brazzaville. At present, the capital city of Brazzaville hosts 34 embassies. Several other countries accredit ambassadors from other capitals.

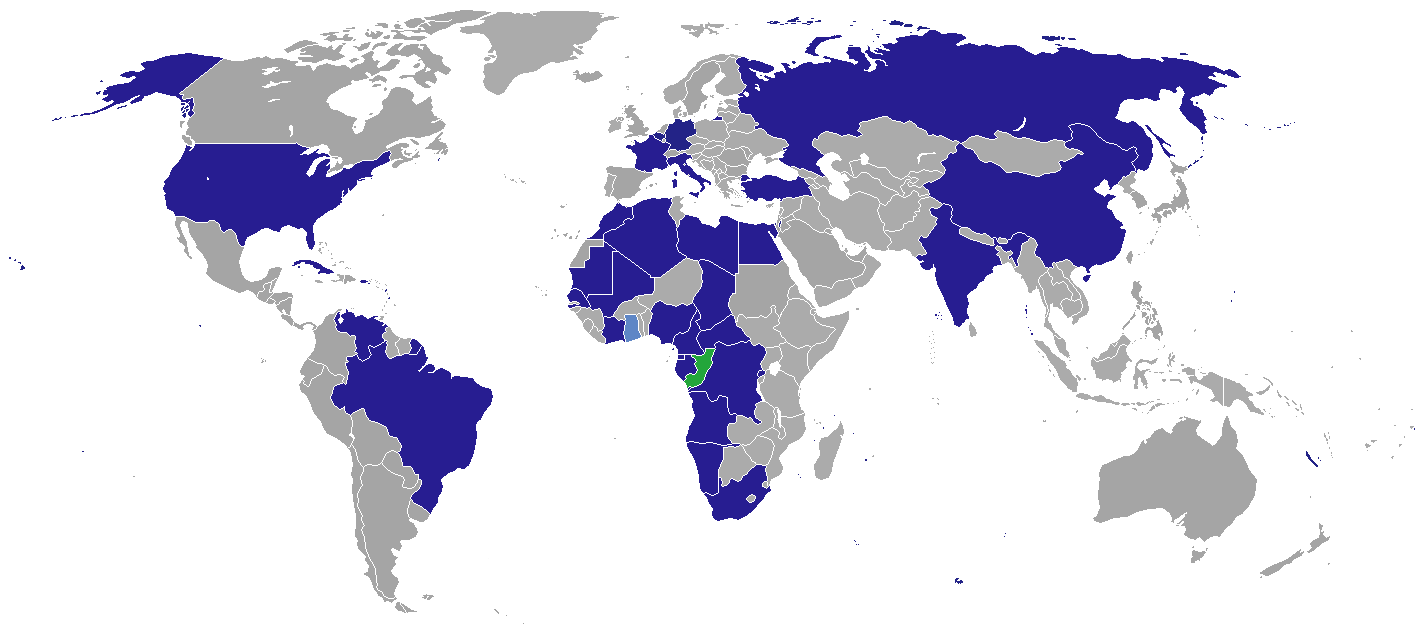
Diplomatic missions in the Republic of Congo

== Diplomatic missions in Brazzaville ==
=== Embassies ===
1. Algeria
2. Angola
3. Belgium
4. Brazil
5. Cameroon
6. Central African Republic
7. Chad
8. China
9. Congo-Kinshasa
10. Cuba
11. Egypt
12. Equatorial Guinea
13. France
14. Gabon
15. Germany
16. Holy See
17. India
18. Italy
19. Ivory Coast
20. Libya
21. Mali
22. Mauritania
23. Morocco
24. Namibia
25. Nigeria
26. Palestine
27. Russia
28. Rwanda
29. South Africa
30. Senegal
31. Sovereign Military Order of Malta
32. Turkey
33. United States
34. Venezuela

=== Other missions/delegations ===
- European Union (Delegation)

== Consular missions ==
=== Brazzaville ===
- Ghana

=== Dolisie ===
- Angola (Consulate-General)

=== Ouesso ===
- Cameroon (Consulate-General)

=== Pointe-Noire ===
- Angola (Consulate-General)
- France (Consulate-General)
- Senegal (Consulate-General)

== Non-resident embassies accredited to Congo-Brazzaville ==
=== Resident in Abuja, Nigeria ===
- Argentina
- Australia
- Czech Republic
- Ireland
- Mexico
- Philippines
- Sierra Leone
- Thailand

=== Resident in Kinshasa, Congo-Kinshasa ===
- Canada
- Ghana
- Greece
- Iran
- Japan
- Kenya
- Liberia
- Netherlands
- Portugal
- Republic of Korea
- Spain
- Sweden
- Switzerland
- Tanzania
- Tunisia
- Uganda
- Ukraine
- United Kingdom
- Zambia
- Zimbabwe

=== Resident in Luanda, Angola ===
- Bulgaria
- Mozambique
- Norway
- Poland
- Romania
- Serbia
- Vietnam

=== Resident in other cities ===
- Austria (Addis Ababa)
- Croatia (Paris)
- Denmark (Cotonou)
- Ethiopia (Kigali)
- Indonesia (Yaoundé)
- Israel (Yaoundé)
- Malaysia (Windhoek)
- Malta (Valletta)
- New Zealand (Addis Ababa)
- Pakistan (Dar es Salaam)
- Saudi Arabia (Libreville)
- São Tomé and Príncipe (Libreville)
- Seychelles (Pretoria)
- Slovakia (Dar es Salaam)

== Closed missions ==
Host city	Sending country	Mission	Year closed	Ref.
Brazzaville	Czechoslovakia	Embassy	1969	
Brazzaville	Vietnam	Embassy	1992	

== Mission to open ==
Host city	Sending country	Mission	Ref.
Brazzaville	Kenya	Embassy	

== See also ==
- Foreign relations of the Republic of the Congo
