= List of diplomatic missions of the Democratic Republic of the Congo =

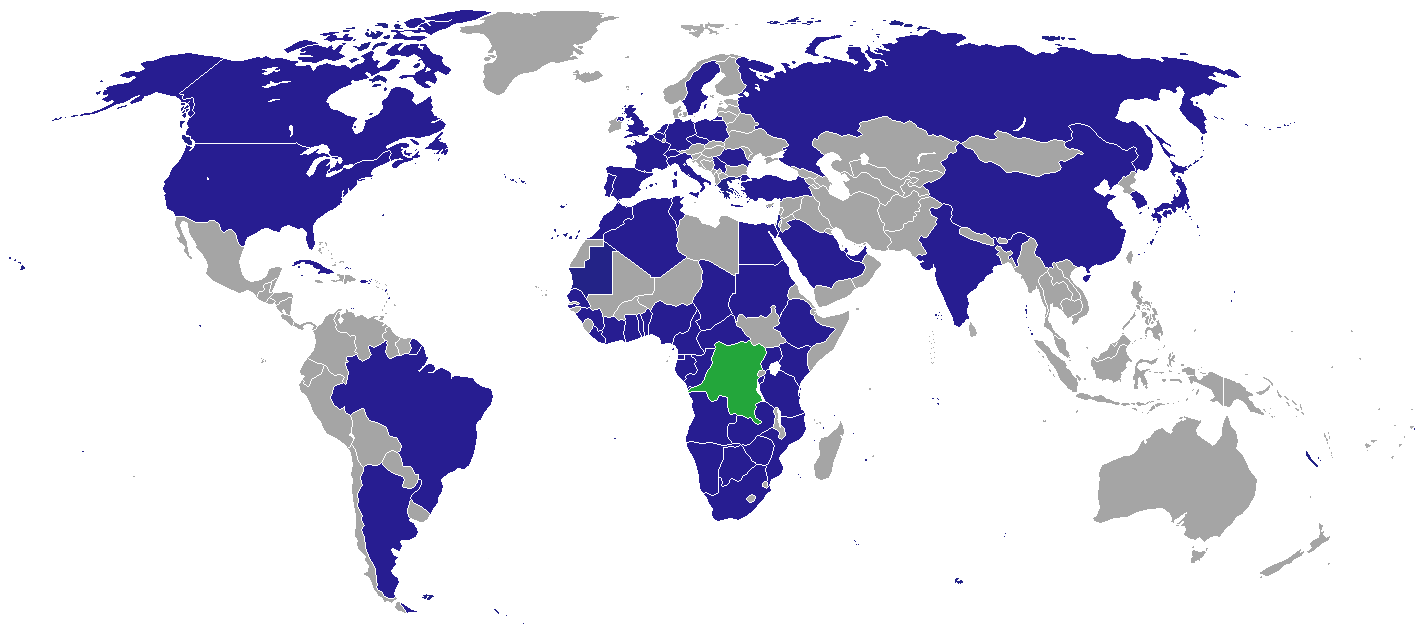
Map of Congolese diplomatic missions

This is a list of diplomatic missions of the Democratic Republic of the Congo, also known as Congo-Kinshasa and DR Congo.

Honorary consulates and trade missions are excluded from this listing.

== Africa ==
- Algeria
  - Algiers (Embassy)
- Angola
  - Luanda (Embassy)
  - Luena (Consulate-General)
- Benin
  - Cotonou (Embassy)
- Botswana
  - Gaborone (Embassy)
- Burundi
  - Bujumbura (Embassy)
- Cameroon
  - Yaoundé (Embassy)
- Central African Republic
  - Bangui (Embassy)
- Chad
  - N'Djamena (Embassy)
  - Moundou (Consulate)
- Congo-Brazzaville
  - Brazzaville (Embassy)
- Egypt
  - Cairo (Embassy)
- Equatorial Guinea
  - Malabo (Embassy)
- Ethiopia
  - Addis Ababa (Embassy) (Note: Also accredited to Djibouti, African Union, & United Nations Economic Commission for Africa.)
- Gabon
  - Libreville (Embassy)
- Ghana
  - Accra (Embassy)
- Guinea
  - Conakry (Embassy)
- Ivory Coast
  - Abidjan (Embassy)
- Kenya
  - Nairobi (Embassy)
- Liberia
  - Monrovia (Embassy)
- Libya
  - Tripoli (Embassy)
- Mauritania
  - Nouakchott (Embassy)
- Morocco
  - Rabat (Embassy)
  - Dakhla (Consulate-General)
- Mozambique
  - Maputo (Embassy)
- Namibia
  - Windhoek (Embassy)
- Nigeria
  - Abuja (Embassy)
- Senegal
  - Dakar (Embassy)
- South Africa
  - Pretoria (Embassy) (Note: Also accredited to Mauritius.)
- Sudan
  - Khartoum (Embassy)
- Tanzania
  - Dar es Salaam (Embassy)
  - Kigoma (Consulate-General)
- Togo
  - Lomé (Embassy)
- Tunisia
  - Tunis (Embassy)
- Uganda
  - Kampala (Embassy)
- Zambia
  - Lusaka (Embassy) (Note: Also accredited to Malawi.)
  - Ndola (Consulate-General)
- Zimbabwe
  - Harare (Embassy)

== Americas ==
- Argentina
  - Buenos Aires (Embassy) (Note: Also accredited to Chile and Uruguay.)
- Brazil
  - Brasília (Embassy)
- Canada
  - Ottawa (Embassy)
- Cuba
  - Havana (Embassy)
- United States
  - Washington, D.C. (Embassy)

== Asia ==
- China
  - Beijing (Embassy) (Note: Also accredited to Cambodia, Philippines, and Thailand.)
- India
  - New Delhi (Embassy) (Note: Also accredited to Indonesia, Malaysia, Sri Lanka, and Singapore.)
- Israel
  - Tel Aviv (Embassy)
- Japan
  - Tokyo (Embassy)
- Qatar
  - Doha (Embassy)
- Saudi Arabia
  - Riyadh (Embassy)
- South Korea
  - Seoul (Embassy)
- Turkey
  - Ankara (Embassy)
- United Arab Emirates
  - Abu Dhabi (Embassy)

== Europe ==
- Belgium
  - Brussels (Embassy) (Note: Also accredited to Luxembourg, Netherlands, and European Union.)
  - Antwerp (Consulate-General)
- Czech Republic
  - Prague (Embassy) (Note: Also accredited to Bulgaria and Slovakia.)
- France
  - Paris (Embassy) (Note: Also accredited to Andorra, Monaco, and UNESCO.)
- Germany
  - Berlin (Embassy) (Note: Also accredited to Austria.)
- Greece
  - Athens (Embassy) (Note: Also accredited to Cyprus.)
- Holy See
  - Rome (Embassy) (Note: The Congolese Embassy to the Holy See is located outside Vatican territory in Rome.)
- Italy
  - Rome (Embassy)
- Netherlands
  - The Hague (Embassy)
- Poland
  - Warsaw (Embassy) (Note: Also accredited to Hungary.)
- Portugal
  - Lisbon (Embassy)
- Romania
  - Bucharest (Embassy)
- Russia
  - Moscow (Embassy) (Note: Also accredited to Azerbaijan and Georgia.)
- Serbia
  - Belgrade (Embassy)
- Spain
  - Madrid (Embassy) (Note: Also accredited to UN Tourism.)
- Sweden
  - Stockholm (Embassy) (Note: Also accredited to Denmark and Finland.)
- Switzerland
  - Bern (Embassy)
- United Kingdom
  - London (Embassy) (Note: Also accredited to Ireland and Norway.)

== Multilateral organisations ==
- United Nations
  - New York City
  - Geneva

== Gallery ==
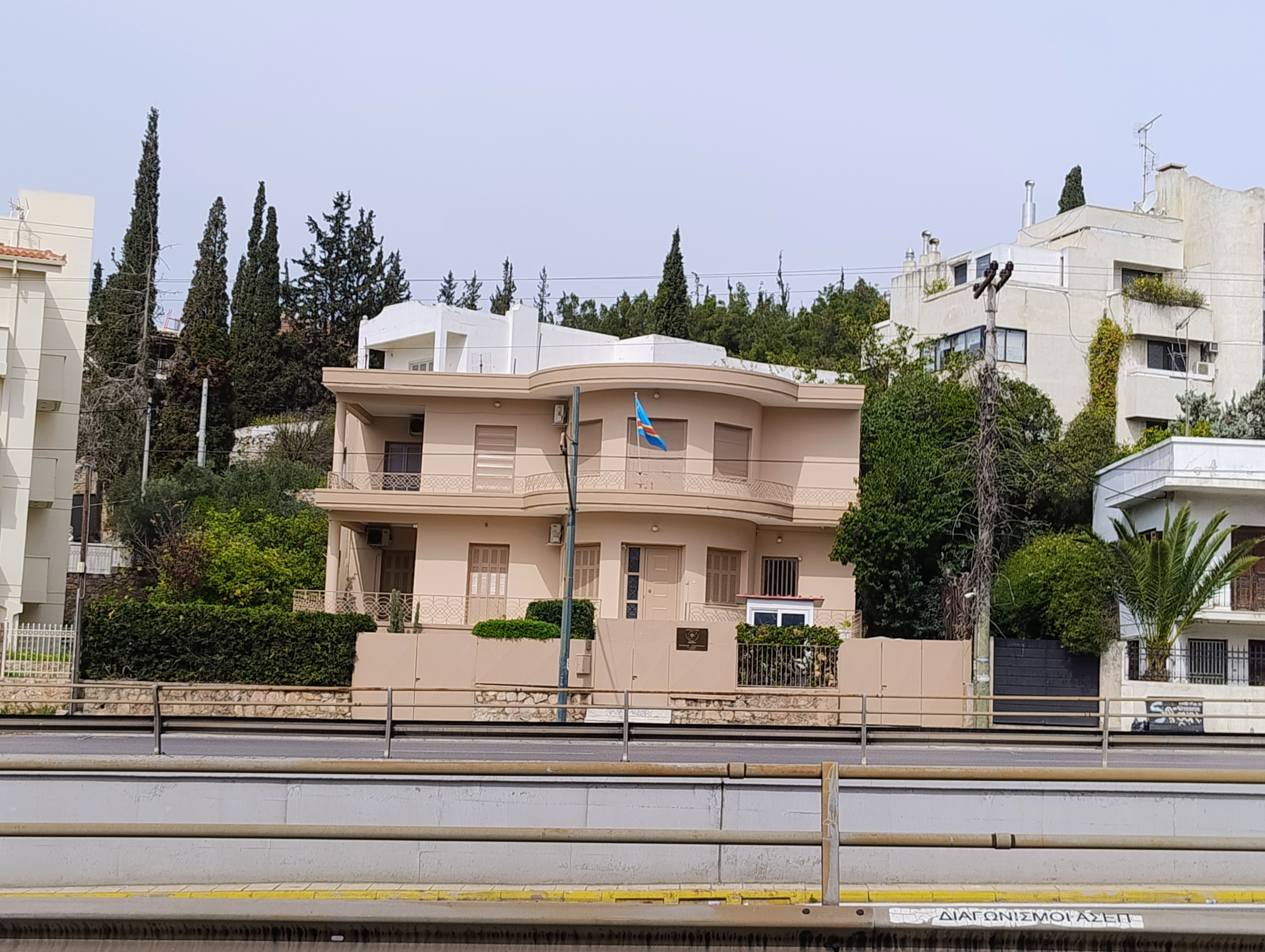
Embassy in Athens

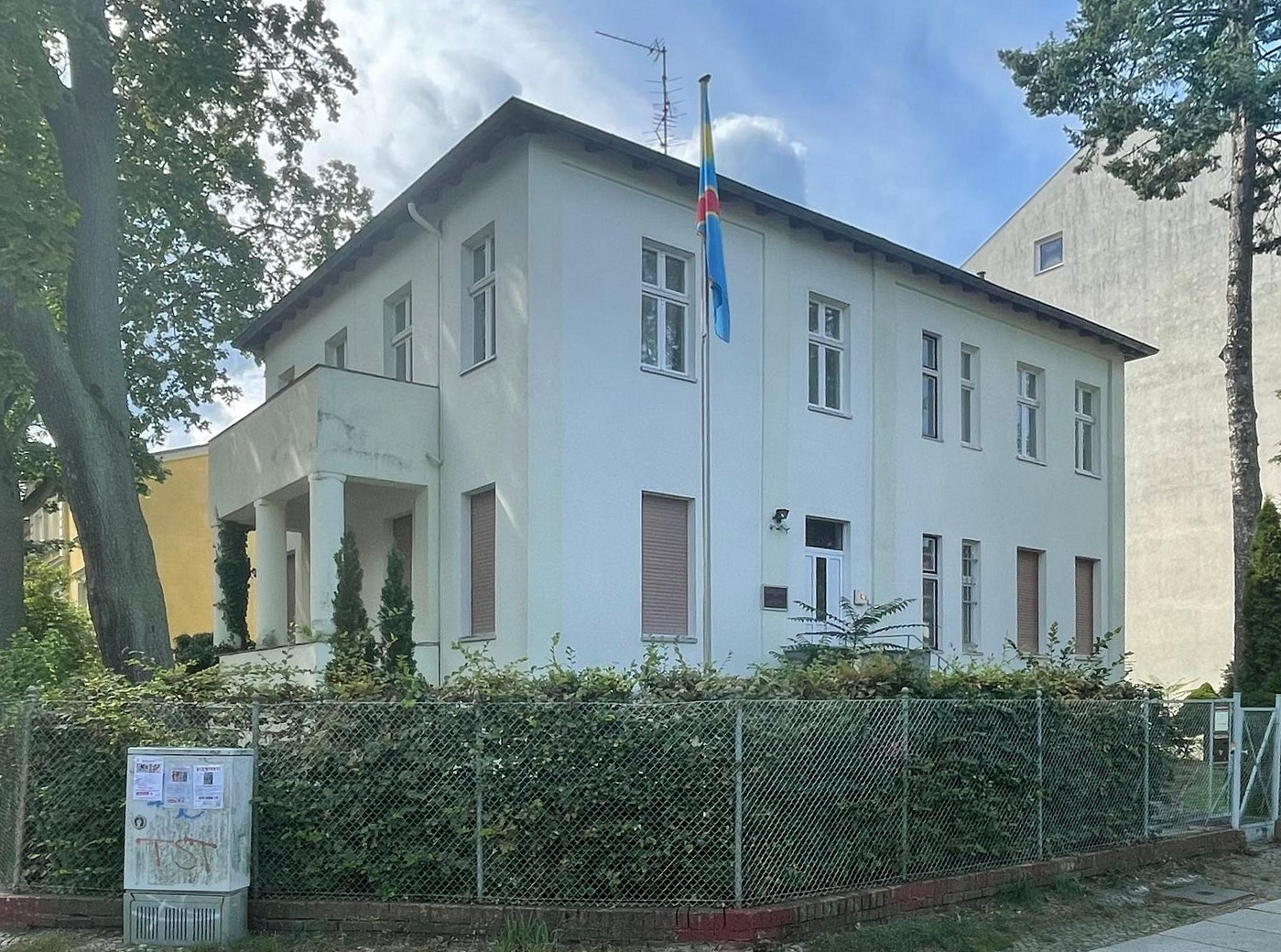
Embassy in Berlin

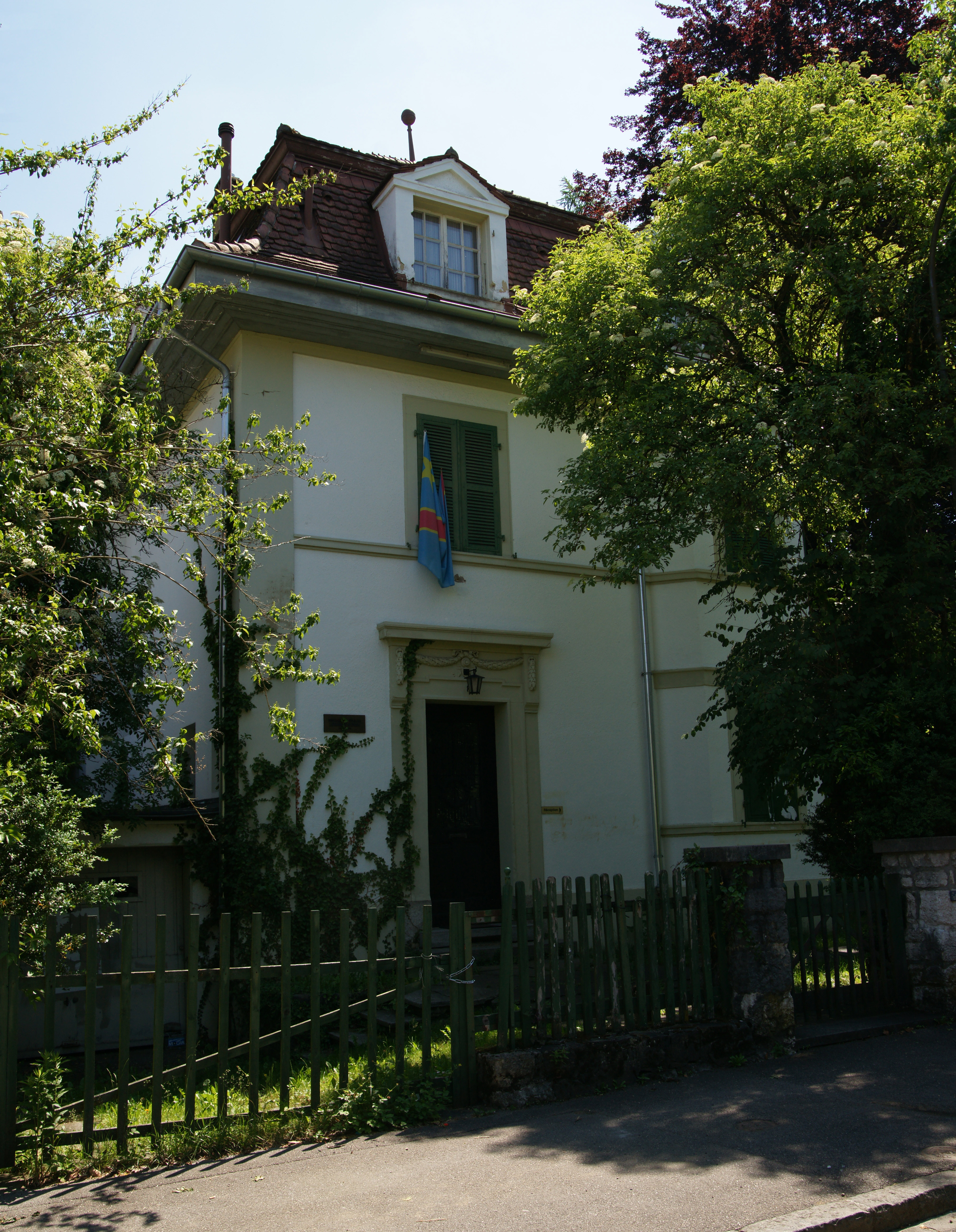
Embassy in Bern

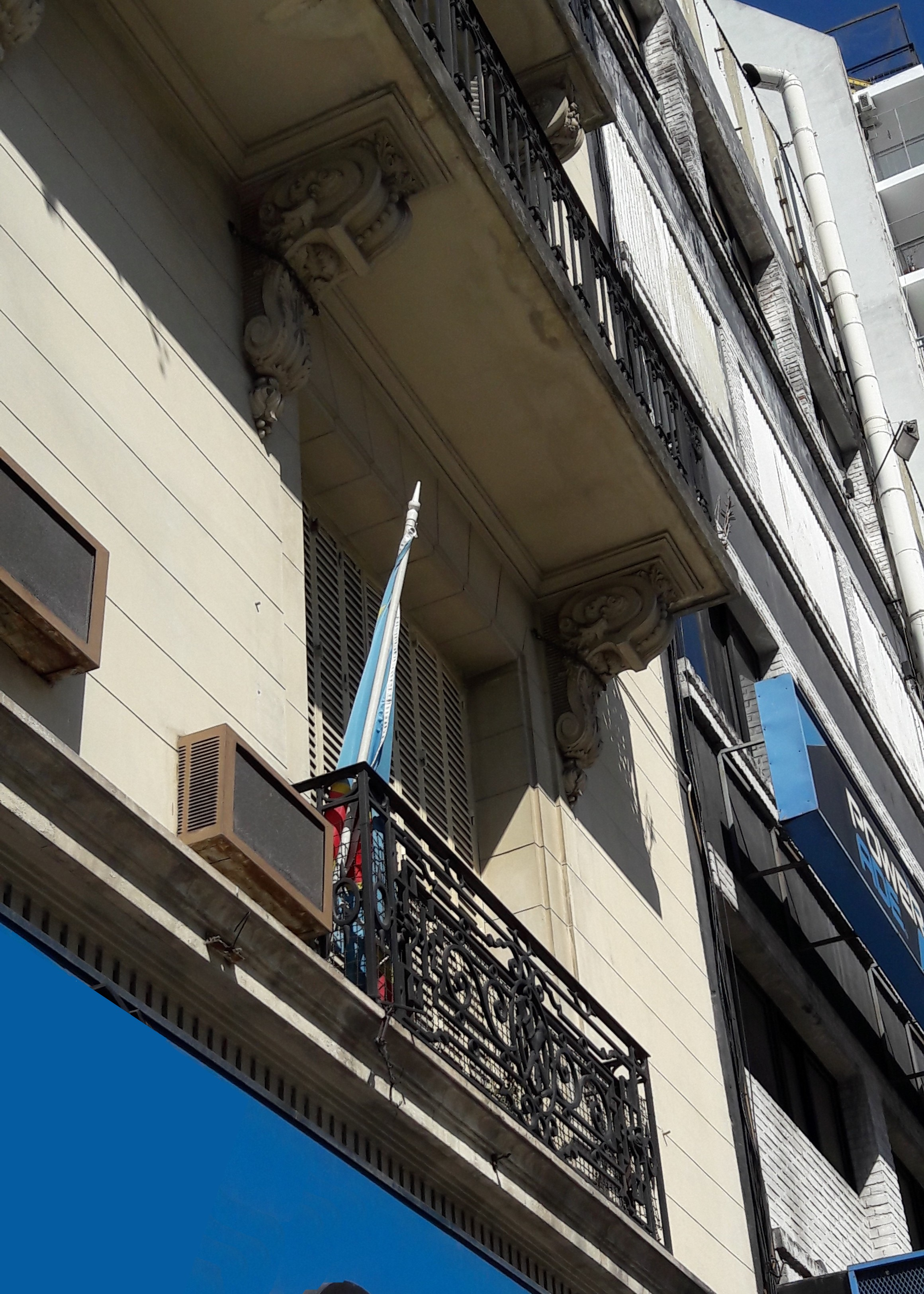
Embassy in Buenos Aires

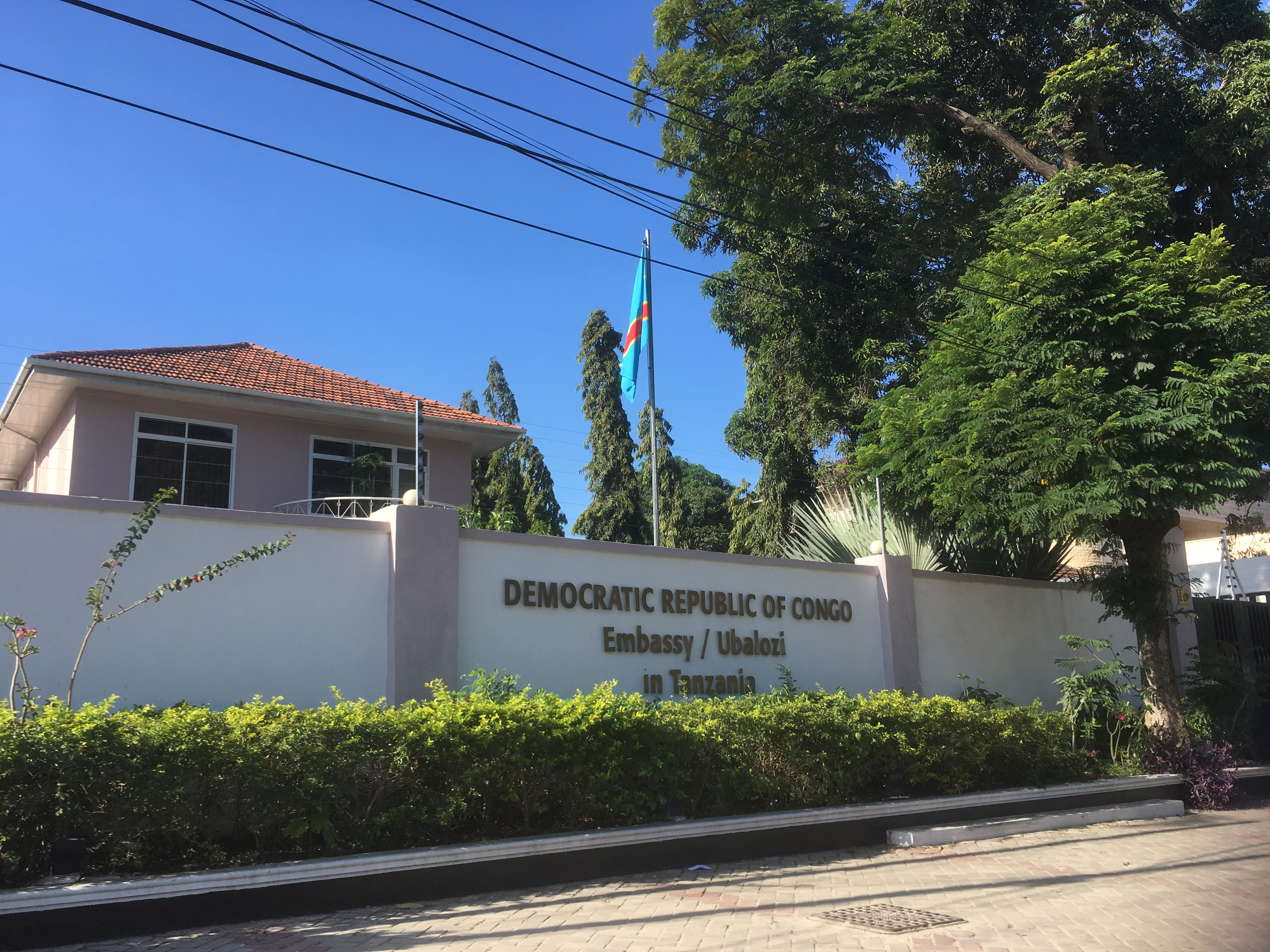
Embassy in Dar es Salaam

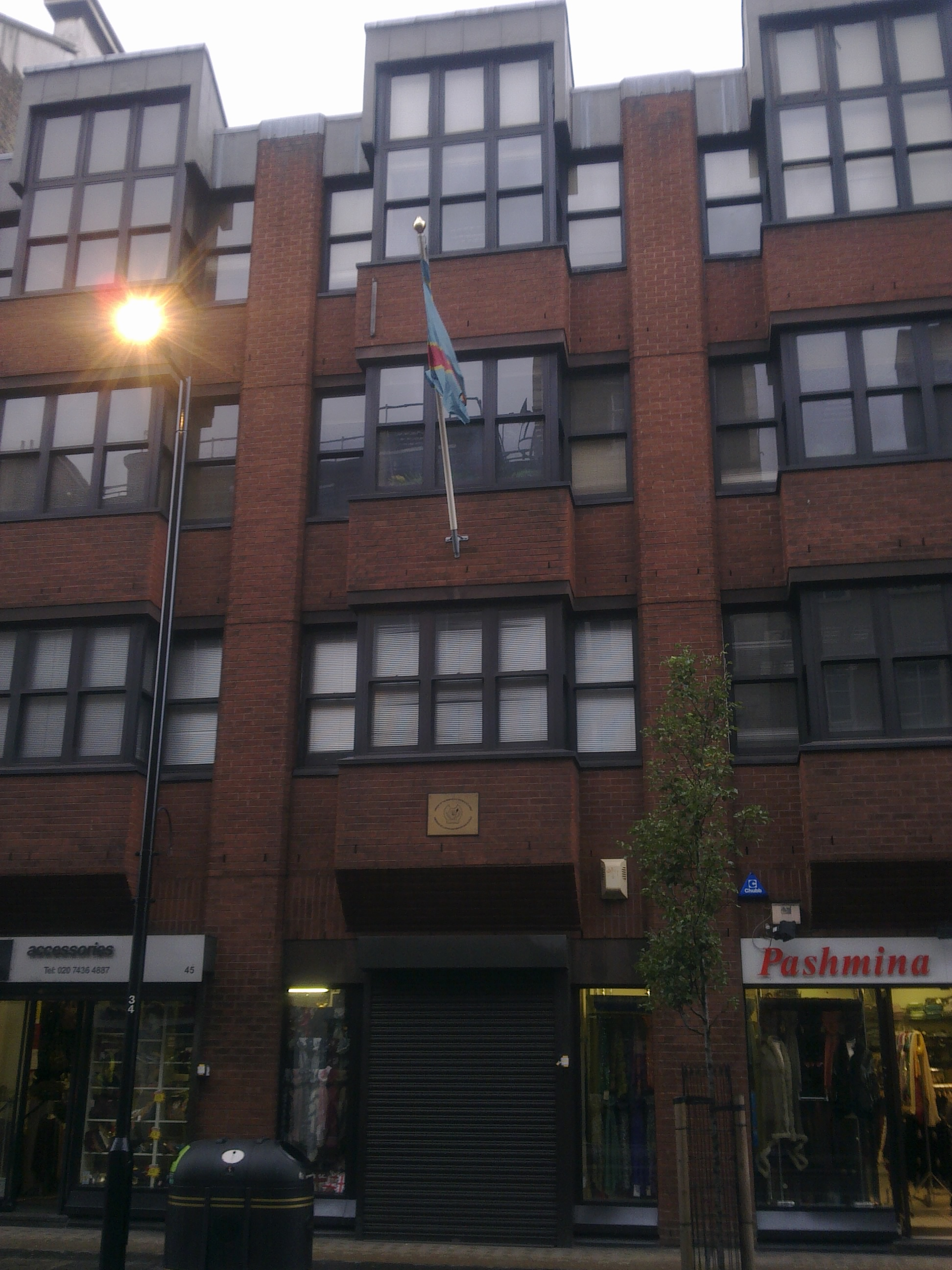
Building hosting the embassy in London

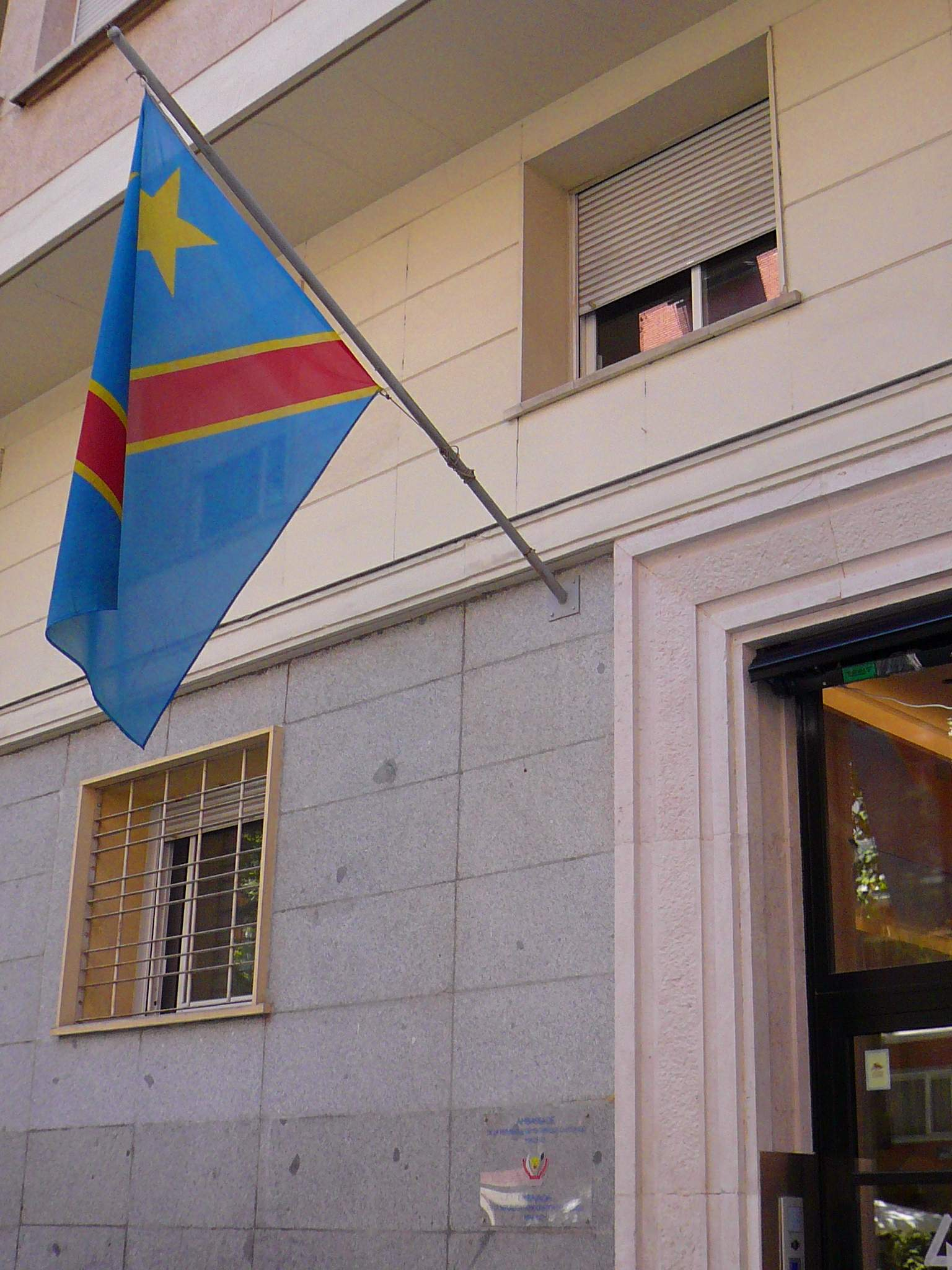
Embassy in Madrid

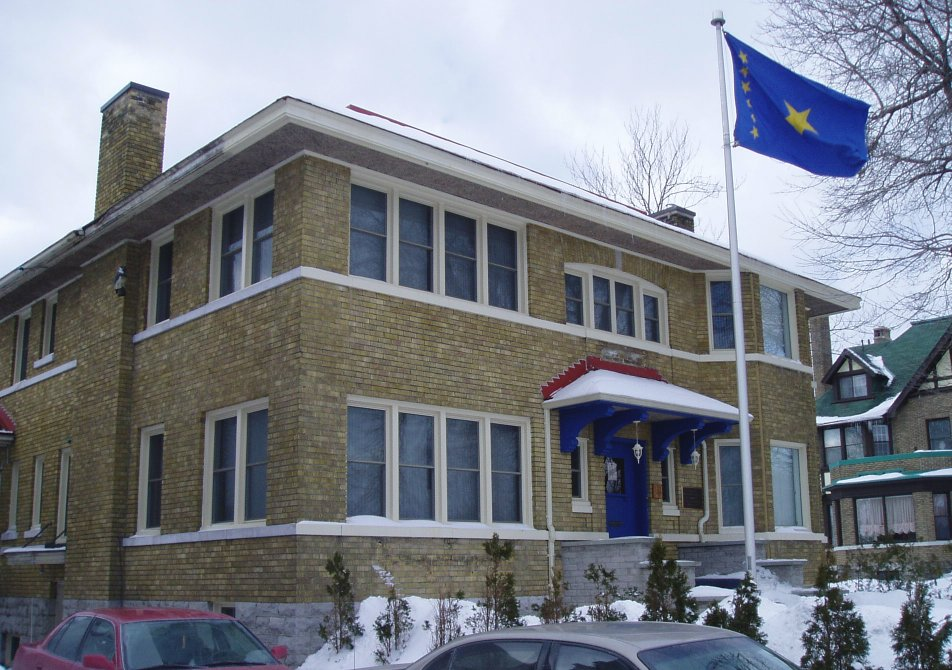
Embassy in Ottawa

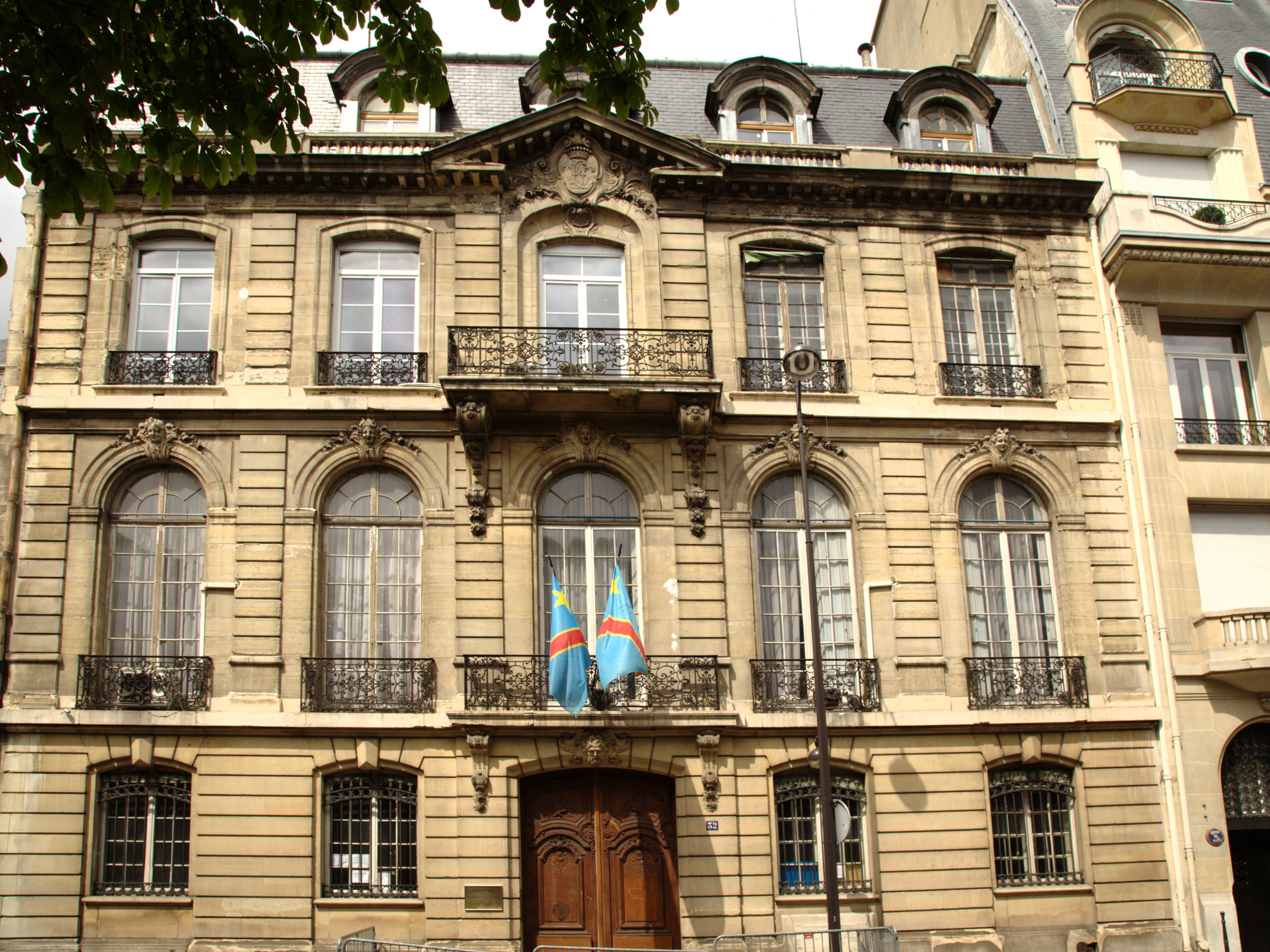
Embassy in Paris

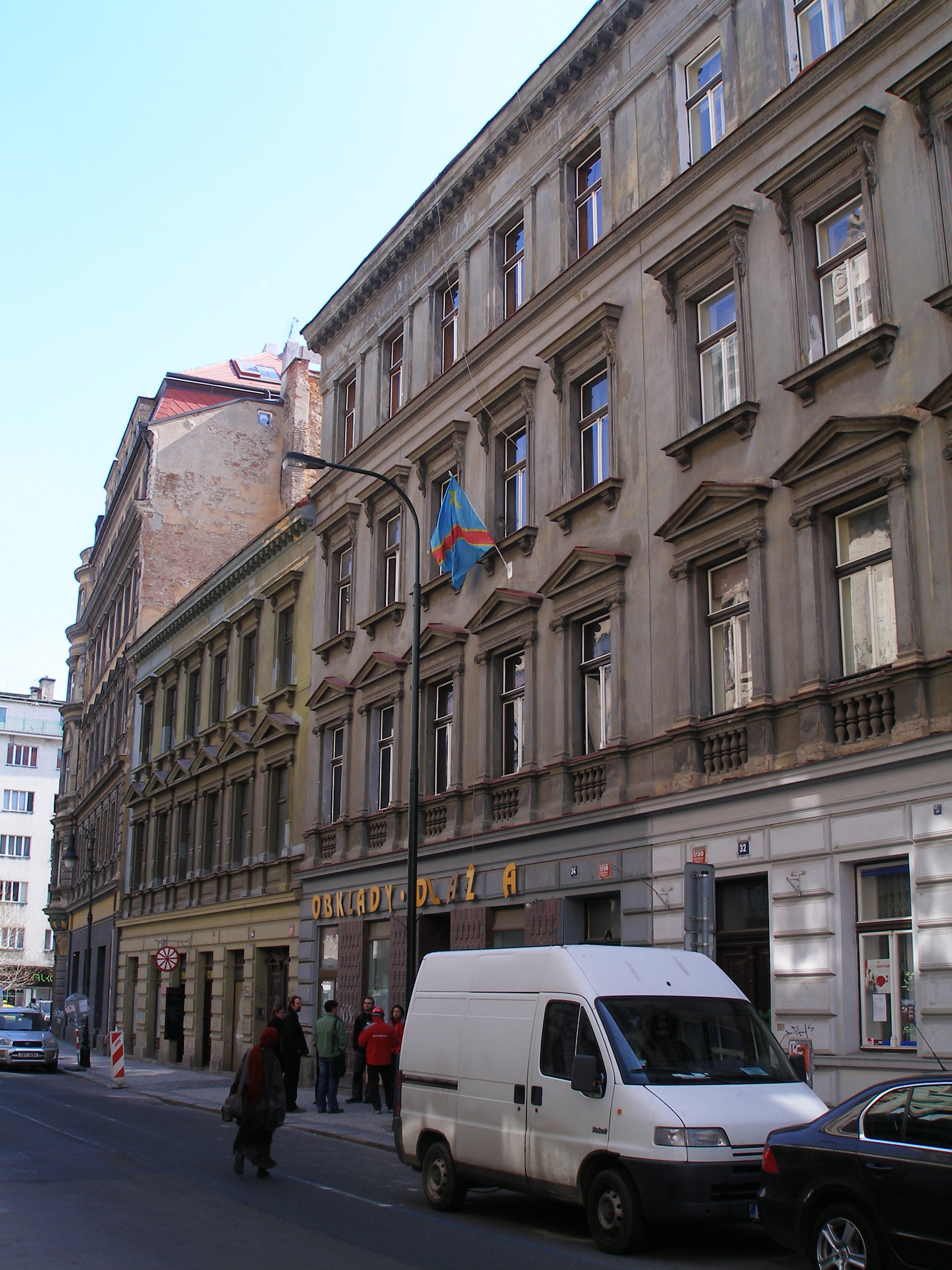
Embassy in Prague

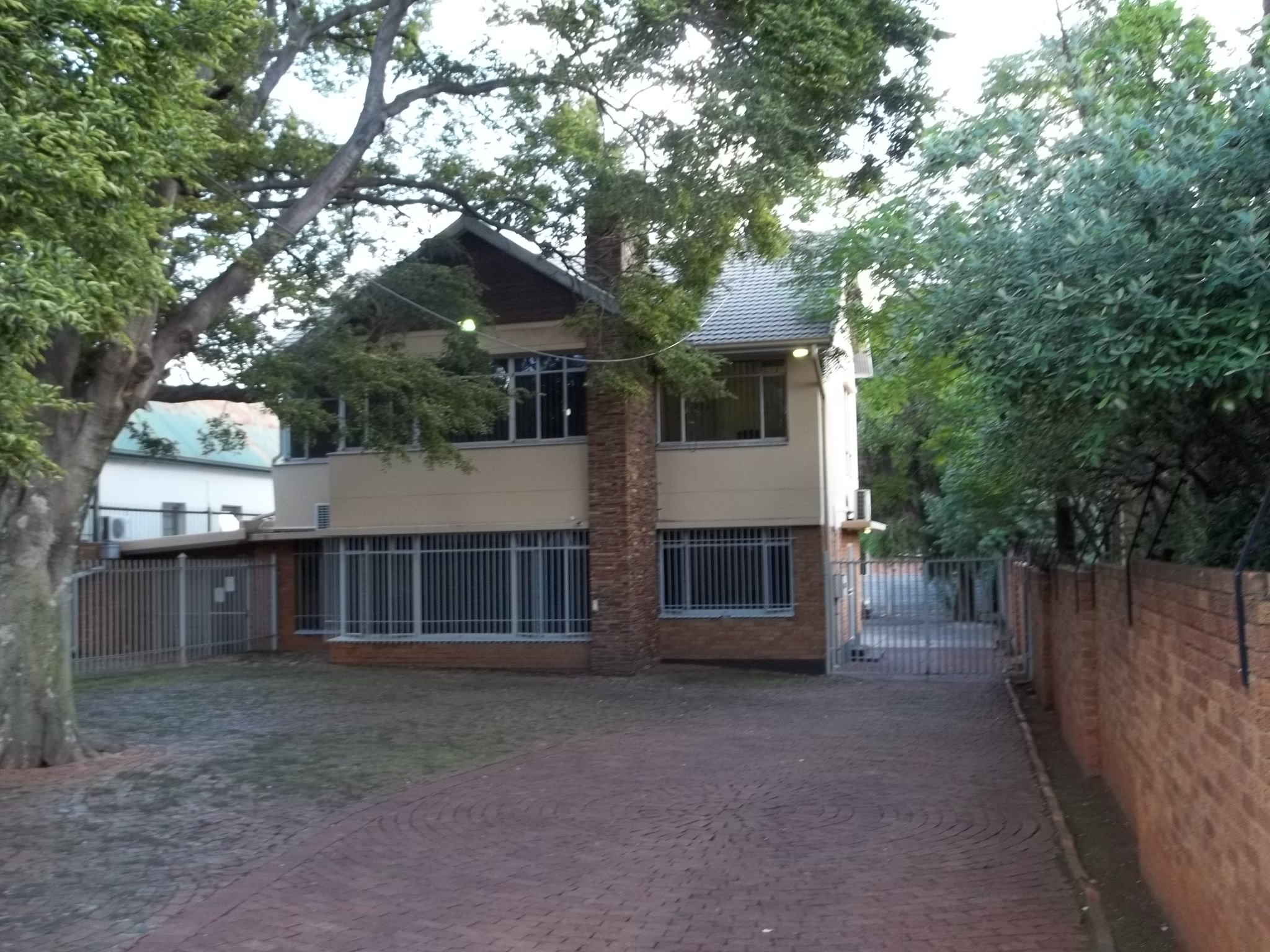
Embassy in Pretoria

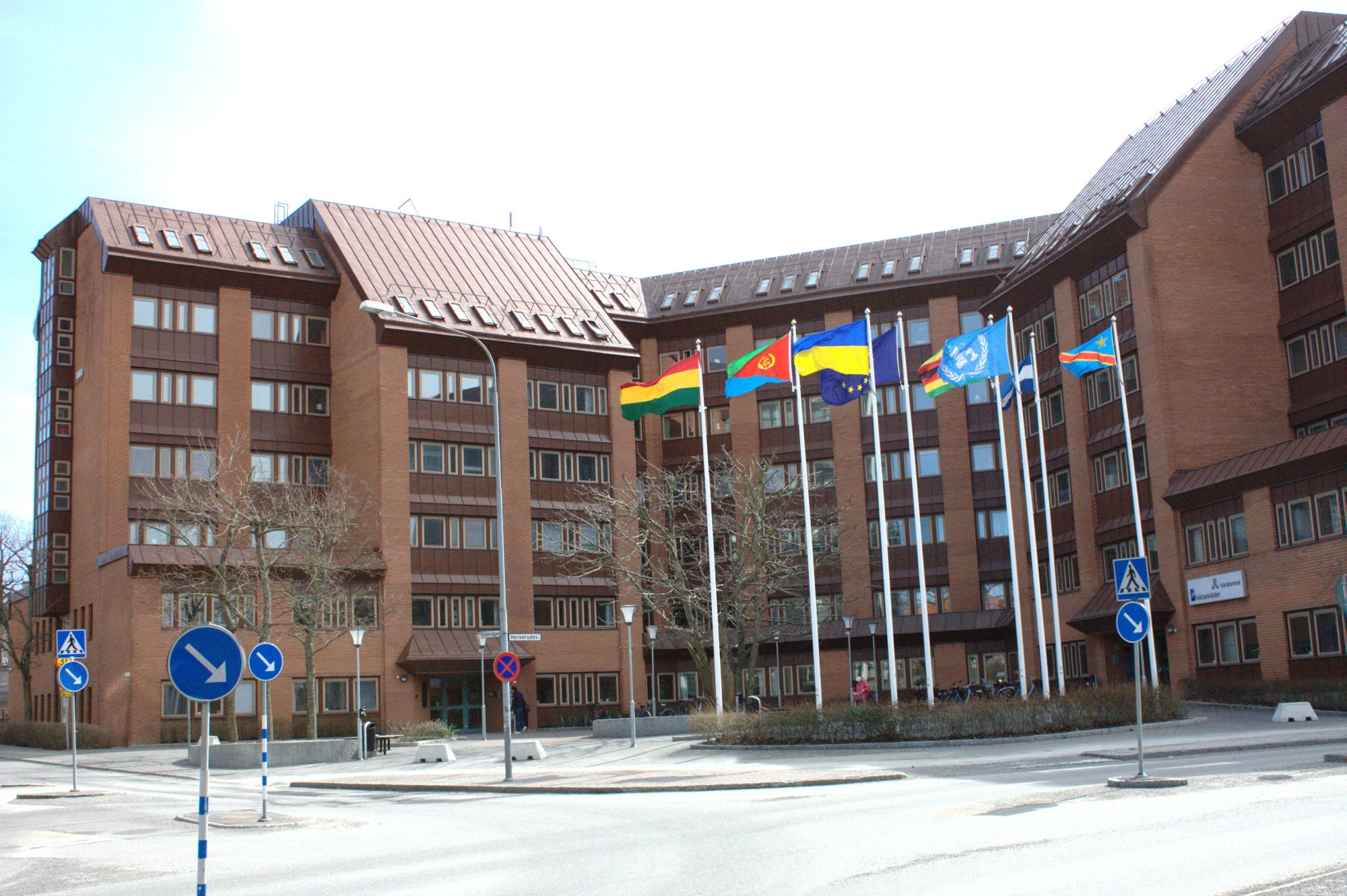
Building hosting the embassy in Stockholm

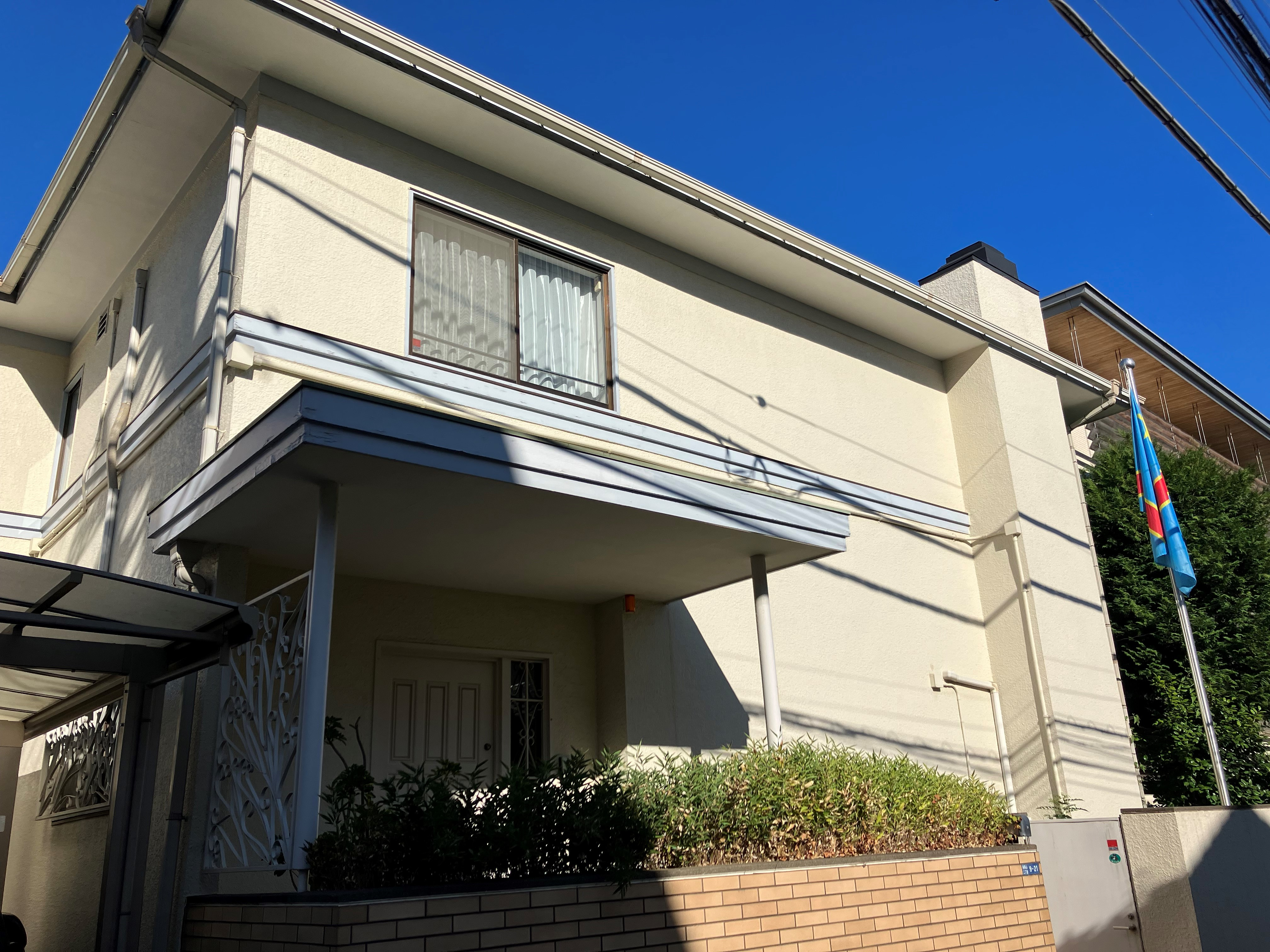
Embassy in Tokyo

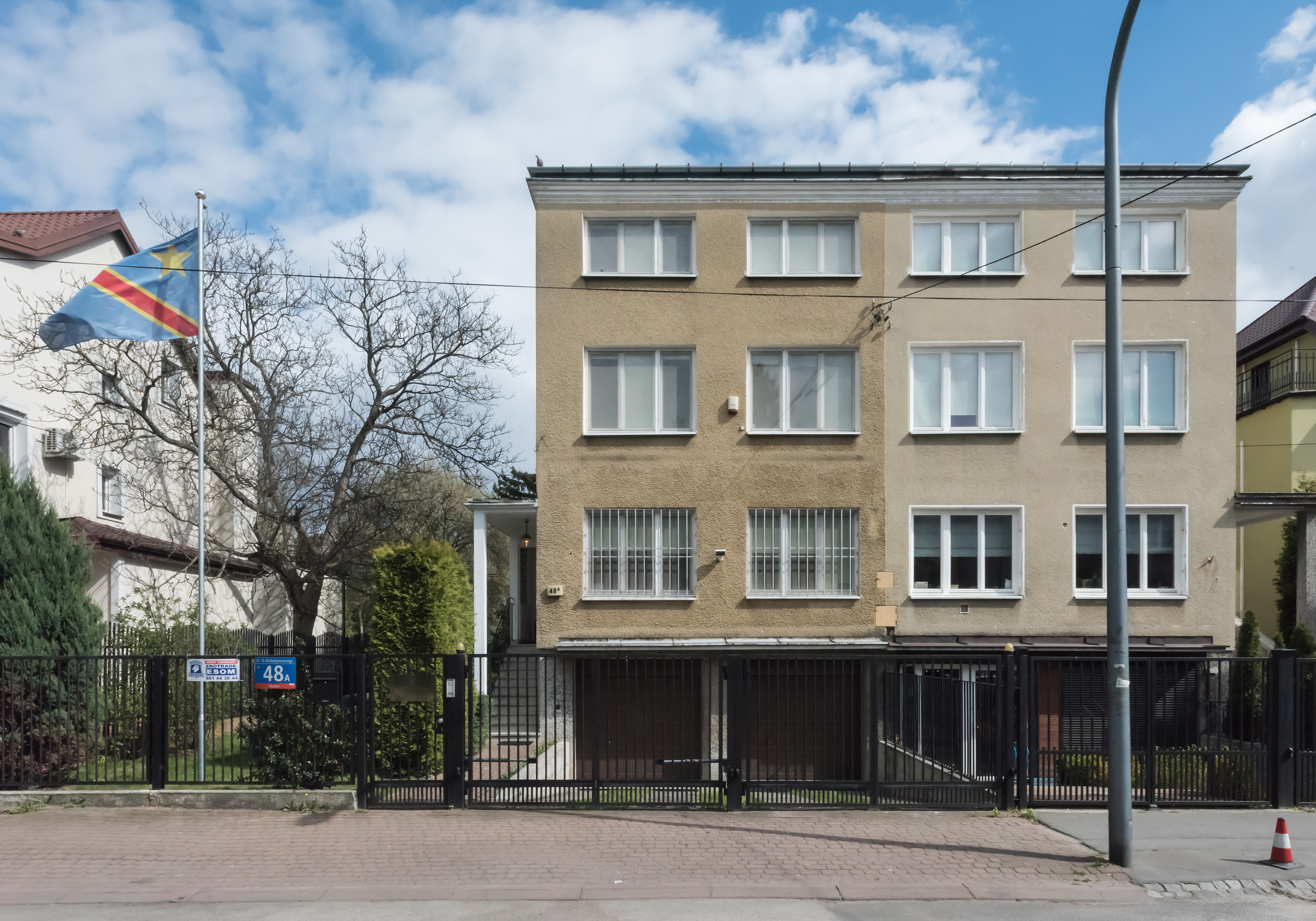
Embassy in Warsaw

== See also ==
- Foreign relations of the Democratic Republic of the Congo
- List of diplomatic missions in the Democratic Republic of the Congo
- Visa policy of the Democratic Republic of the Congo
