= Visa policy of the Democratic Republic of the Congo =

Policy on permits required to enter the Democratic Republic of the Congo

Visitors to the Democratic Republic of the Congo must obtain a visa from one of the Democratic Republic of the Congo diplomatic missions unless they are citizens of visa-exempt countries, citizens who can obtain a visa on arrival or citizens eligible to obtain an e-Visa.

In recent years, it is possible to arrange a tourist visa for visiting the Virunga National Park (on the Eastern Border) through the park itself.

Visitors with a visa that was not issued in the country of residence could be refused entry. Visas issued in another country are only accepted when there is no embassy of Congo (Dem. Rep.) in the country of residence.

== Visa policy map ==
Democratic Republic of the Congo Visa not required - 90 days Visa on arrival eVisa

== Visa exemption ==
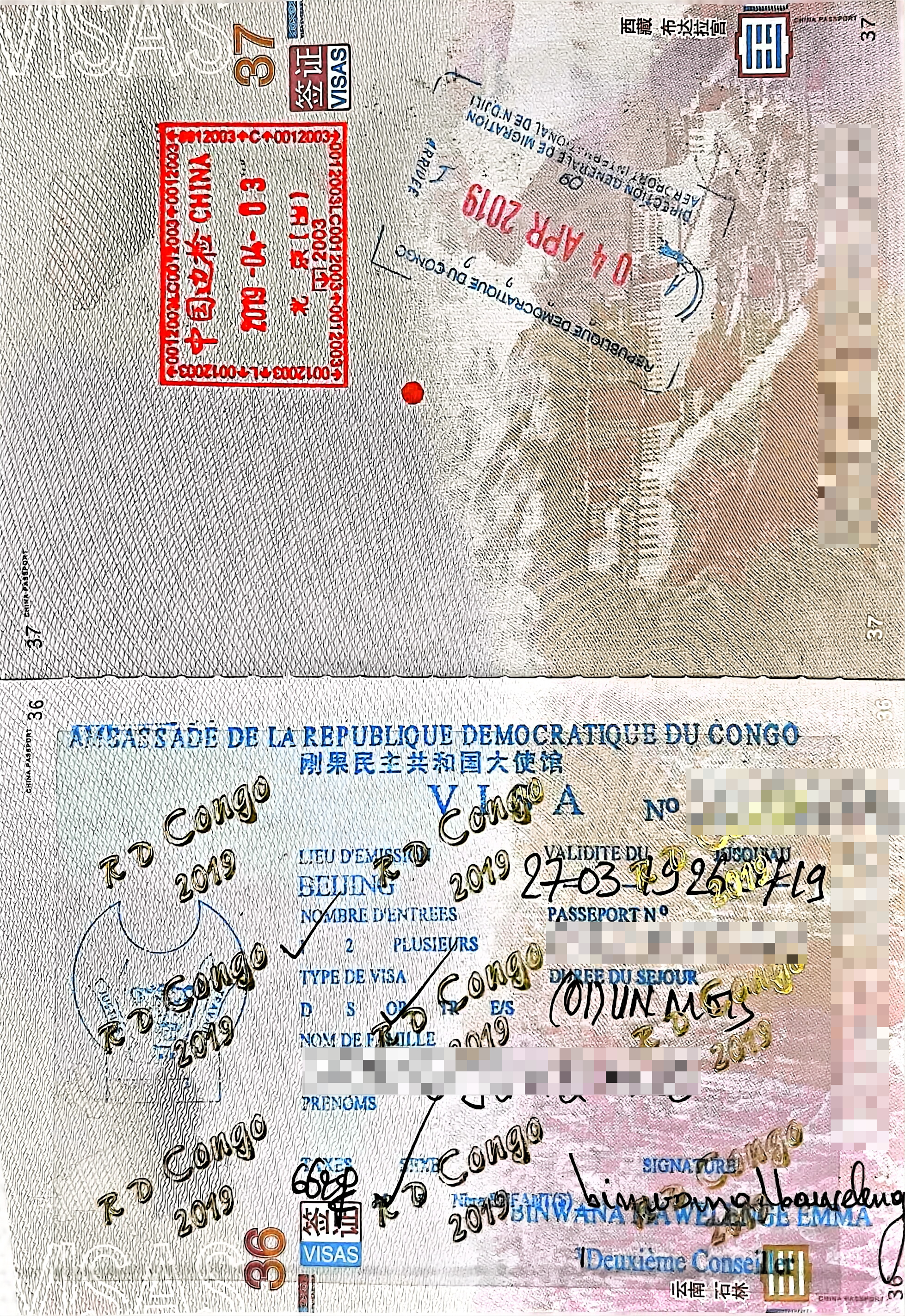
A visa issued by the Embassy of the D.R. Congo in China on a Chinese passport in 2019

=== Ordinary passports ===
Citizens of the following countries may enter the Democratic Republic of the Congo without a visa for up to 90 days:

- Burundi
- Congo
- Kenya
- Rwanda
- Tanzania
- Uganda
- Zimbabwe

In April 2025, the DR Congo authorities abolished the visa exemption granted to Zimbabwean transport drivers. They must pay 50 USD for a 30-day visa.

=== Non-ordinary passports ===
In addition, holders of diplomatic and official passports of the following countries may enter DR Congo without a visa:

- Angola (On duty)
- Iran
- Russia
- South Africa
- Turkey^{D}
- United Arab Emirates ^{D}

_{D - Diplomatic passports only.}

=== Future changes ===
DR Congo has signed visa exemption agreements with the following countries, but they have not yet entered into force:

| Country | Passports | Agreement signed on |
|---|---|---|
| Chad | All | 26 June 2024 |

== Visa on arrival ==
- Citizens of Mauritius may obtain a visa on arrival valid for up to 7 days.
- Visitors with a document that proves their DR Congo origins may obtain a visa on arrival for a maximum stay of 30 days.
- Visitors with a document that proves that their parents are of DR Congo origins may obtain a visa on arrival for a maximum stay of 30 days.
- Visitors arriving from a country with no DR Congo embassy may apply for a visa confirmation ("visa volant"). A letter of request is sent via e-mail to the Direction Générale de Migration with a photocopy of the passport of the applicant and the inviting person/organization. A confirmation is sent to the applicant which is then used to obtain a visa on arrival, valid for 7 days and extendable in the DR Congo.

== Electronic visa (e-Visa) ==
Citizens of other countries may obtain an e-Visa for up to 7 days. The electronic visa must be used within 3 months from the date of issue.

In November 2024 DR Congo authorities announced the introduction of electronic visas for early 2025.

The eVisa is usually processed within 72 hours and costs $300. An additional $90 must be paid at the point of entry. According to the eVisa website it can be used at any point of entry (land, sea, air). A Letter of Invitation and a Sponsor are required in order to apply.

== Virunga National Park ==
As tourism is growing steadily for Virunga National Park, the government has joined forces and allowed the Park to act as a facilitator in the visa process. Local tour operators can act as facilitators in the process.

== Visa required in advance ==
Visitors requiring a visa need to submit a legalised letter of invitation from a DR Congo person or organization. For tourists, a hotel booking confirmation is accepted in case the traveller has no contact in the DR Congo .

== See also ==
- Visa requirements for Democratic Republic of the Congo citizens
