= List of diplomatic missions of the Republic of the Congo =

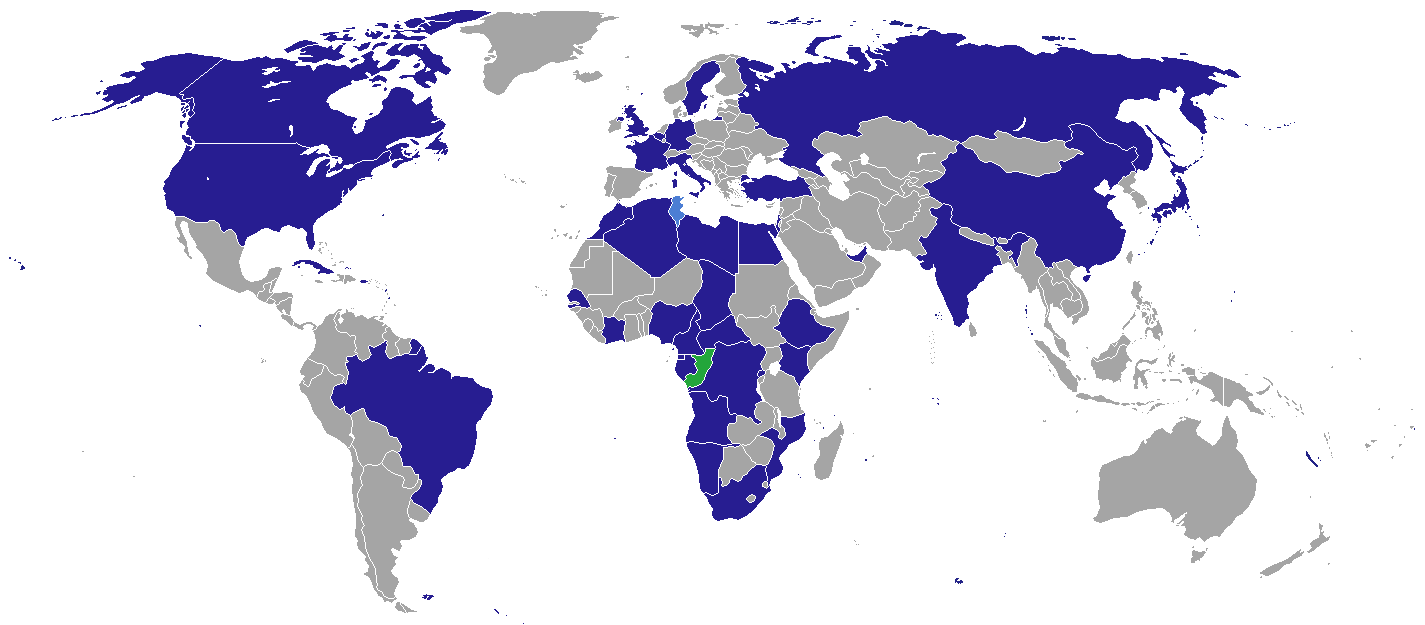
Location of diplomatic missions of the Republic of the Congo: Republic of the Congo Embassy

This is the list of diplomatic missions of the Republic of the Congo, also known as Congo and Congo-Brazzaville .

Honorary consulates and trade missions are excluded from this listing.

== Africa ==
Host country	Host city	Mission	Concurrent accreditation	Ref.
Algeria	Algiers	Embassy	Countries: Tunisia	
Angola	Luanda	Embassy	Countries: Zambia	
Angola	Cabinda	Consulate-General	Countries: Zambia	
Benin	Cotonou	Consulate-General		
Cameroon	Yaoundé	Embassy		
Cameroon	Douala	Consulate-General		
Central African Republic	Bangui	Embassy	Countries: South Sudan	
Chad	N'Djamena	Embassy	Countries: Sudan	
Congo-Kinshasa	Kinshasa	Embassy		
Congo-Kinshasa	Lubumbashi	Consulate-General?		
Egypt	Cairo	Embassy	Countries: Bahrain; Jordan; Kuwait; Lebanon; Palestine; Syria; Yemen	
Equatorial Guinea	Malabo	Embassy		
Ethiopia	Addis Ababa	Embassy	Countries: Djibouti; Eritrea	
Gabon	Libreville	Embassy	Countries: São Tomé and Príncipe	
Gabon	Franceville	Consulate-General	Countries: São Tomé and Príncipe	
Ghana	Accra	Consulate-General		
Ivory Coast	Abidjan	Embassy	Countries: Burkina Faso; Ghana; Guinea; Liberia; Sierra Leone; Togo	
Kenya	Nairobi	Embassy	Countries: Somalia; Tanzania; International Organizations: United Nations; United Nations Environment Programme; United Nations Human Settlements Programme	
Libya	Tripoli	Embassy		
Mali	Bamako	Consulate-General		
Morocco	Rabat	Embassy		
Mozambique	Maputo	Embassy	Countries: Comoros; Madagascar; Malawi; Mauritius; Seychelles	
Namibia	Windhoek	Embassy	Countries: Botswana	
Nigeria	Abuja	Embassy	Countries: Benin; Niger	
Rwanda	Kigali	Embassy	Countries: Burundi	
Senegal	Dakar	Embassy	Countries: Cape Verde; Gambia; Guinea-Bissau; Mali	
South Africa	Pretoria	Embassy	Countries: Eswatini; Lesotho; Zimbabwe	
Tunisia	Tunis	Consulate-General		

== Americas ==
Host country	Host city	Mission	Concurrent accreditation	Ref.
Brazil	Brasília	Embassy	Countries: Argentina; Bolivia; Colombia; Chile; Ecuador; Guyana; Paraguay; Peru; Suriname; Uruguay	
Canada	Ottawa	Embassy		
Cuba	Havana	Embassy	Countries: Bahamas; Belize; Costa Rica; Dominican Republic; El Salvador; Guatemala; Haiti; Honduras; Jamaica; Nicaragua; Panama; Trinidad and Tobago	
United States	Washington, D.C.	Embassy	Countries: Mexico	

== Asia ==
Host country	Host city	Mission	Concurrent accreditation	Ref.
China	Beijing	Embassy	Countries: Cambodia; Laos; Mongolia; Myanmar; North Korea; Philippines; Singapore; South Korea; Thailand; Vietnam	
China	Guangzhou	Consulate-General	Countries: Cambodia; Laos; Mongolia; Myanmar; North Korea; Philippines; Singapore; South Korea; Thailand; Vietnam	
India	New Delhi	Embassy	Countries: Afghanistan; Bangladesh; Bhutan; Brunei; Indonesia; Malaysia; Maldives; Nepal; Sri Lanka	
Japan	Tokyo	Embassy	Countries: Australia; New Zealand; Papua New Guinea; Timor-Leste	
Israel	Tel Aviv	Embassy		
Turkey	Ankara	Embassy	Countries: Cyprus; Georgia; Iran; Iraq; Ukraine	

== Europe ==
Host country	Host city	Mission	Concurrent accreditation	Ref.
Belgium	Brussels	Embassy	Countries: Luxembourg; Netherlands; International Organizations: European Union	
France	Paris	Embassy	Countries: Andorra; Monaco; Portugal	
France	Lyon	Consulate-General?	Countries: Andorra; Monaco; Portugal	
Italy	Rome	Embassy	Countries: Albania; Bosnia and Herzegovina; Croatia; Greece; Malta; Montenegro; North Macedonia; San Marino; Serbia; Slovenia	
Germany	Berlin	Embassy	Countries: Bulgaria; Czechia; Poland	
Holy See	Rome	Embassy		
Russia	Moscow	Embassy	Countries: Armenia; Azerbaijan; Belarus; Kazakhstan; Kyrgyzstan; Latvia; Moldova; Tajikistan; Turkmenistan; Uzbekistan	
Sweden	Stockholm	Embassy	Countries: Finland; Iceland; Norway	
United Kingdom	London	Embassy	Countries: Ireland	

== Embassies to open ==
Austria

Mauritania

Qatar

Saudi Arabia

Spain

United Arab Emirates

Venezuela

== Multilateral organizations ==
Organization	Host city	Host country	Mission	Concurrent accreditation	Ref.
United Nations	New York City	United States	Permanent Mission		
United Nations	Geneva	Switzerland	Permanent Mission	Countries: Switzerland	
UNESCO	Paris	France	Permanent Mission		

== Gallery ==
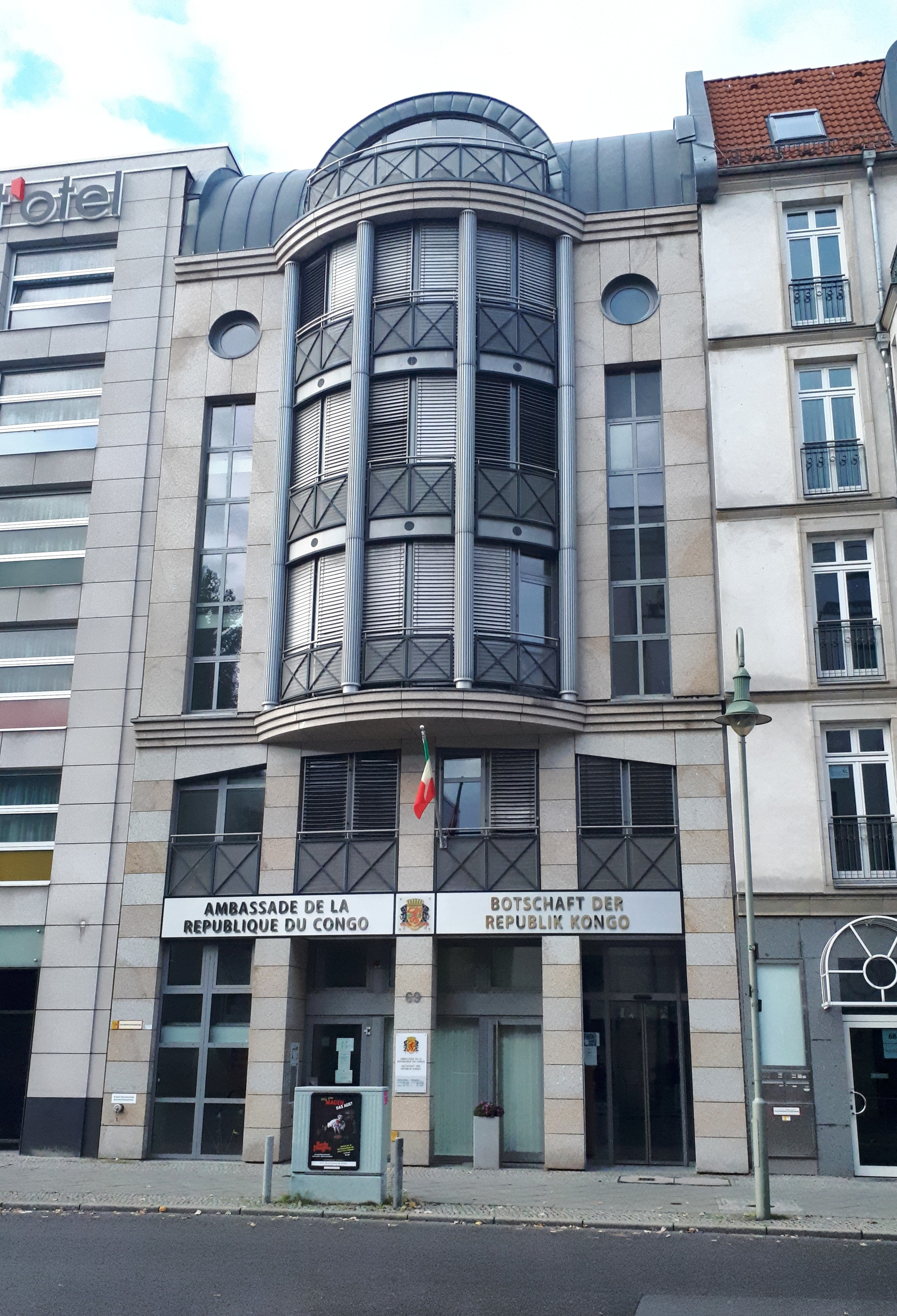
Embassy in Berlin

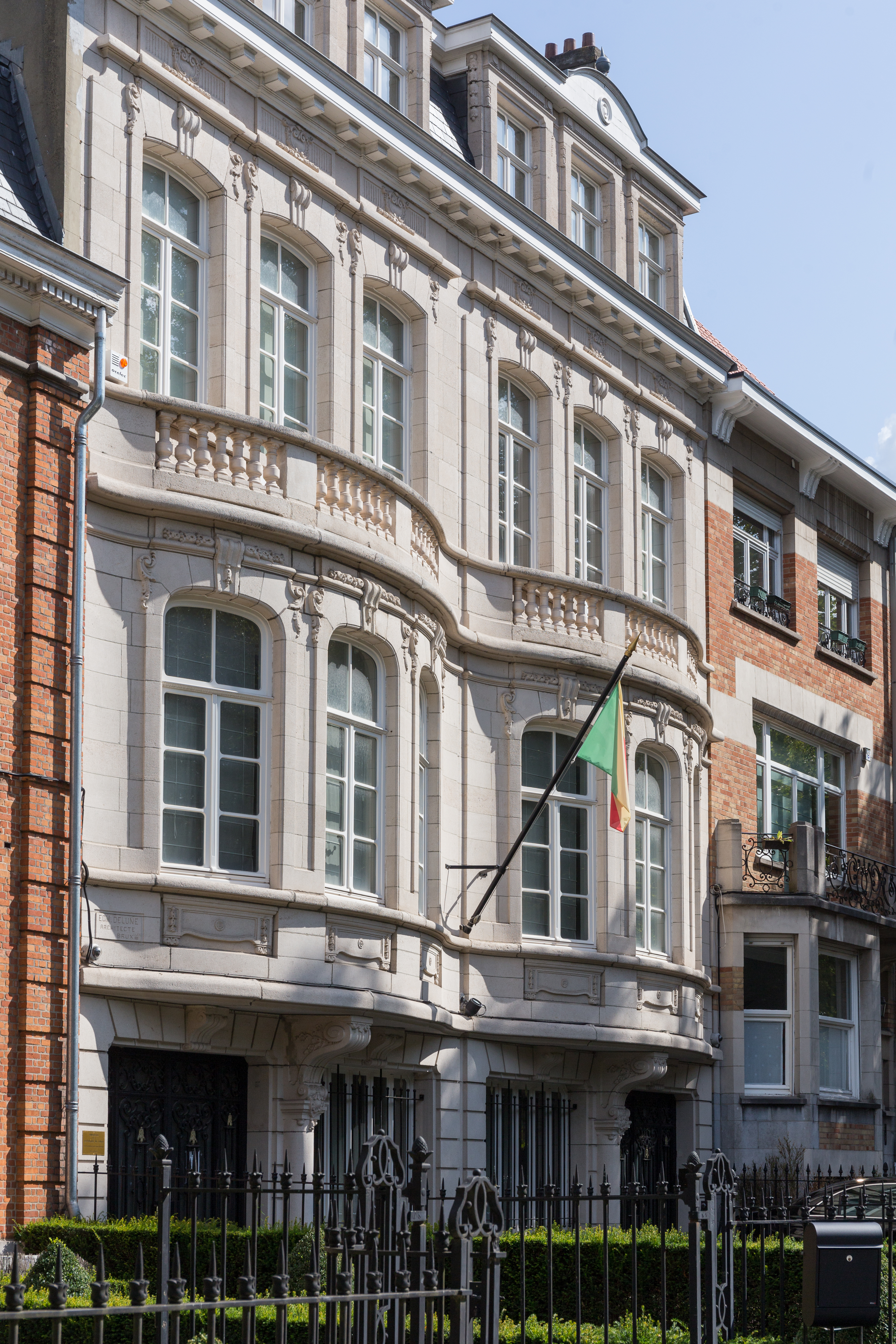
Embassy in Brussels

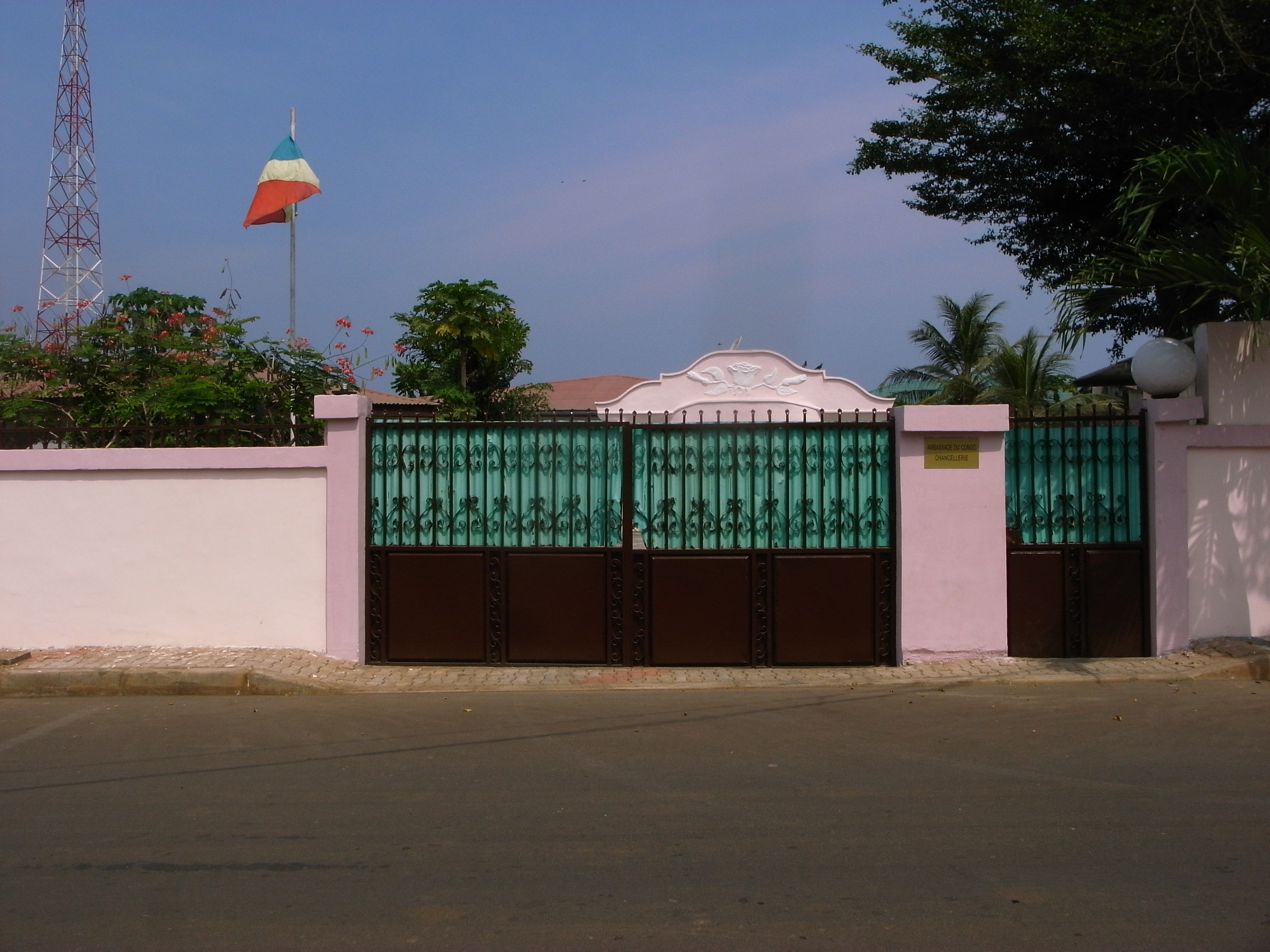
Embassy in Malabo

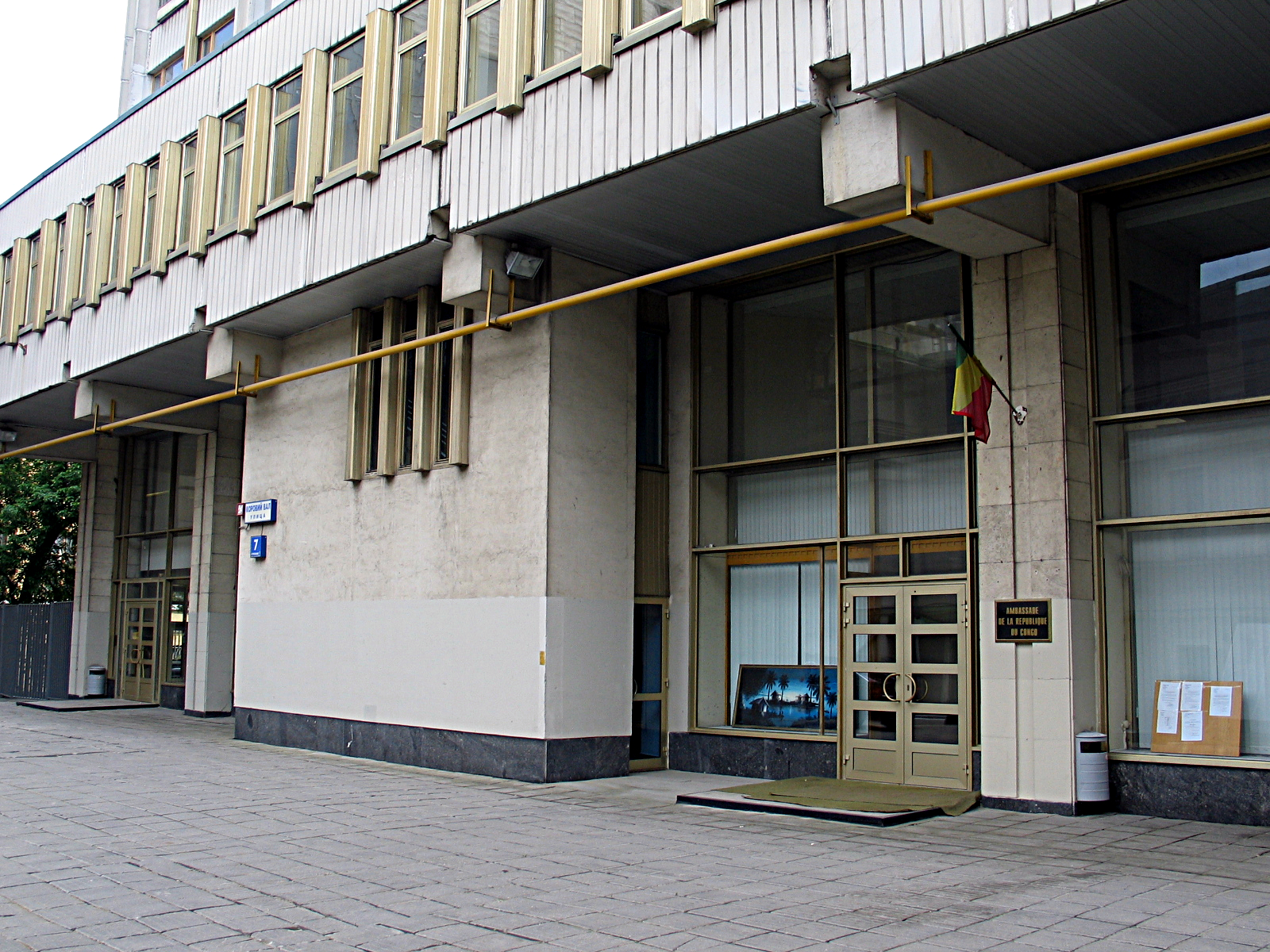
Embassy in Moscow

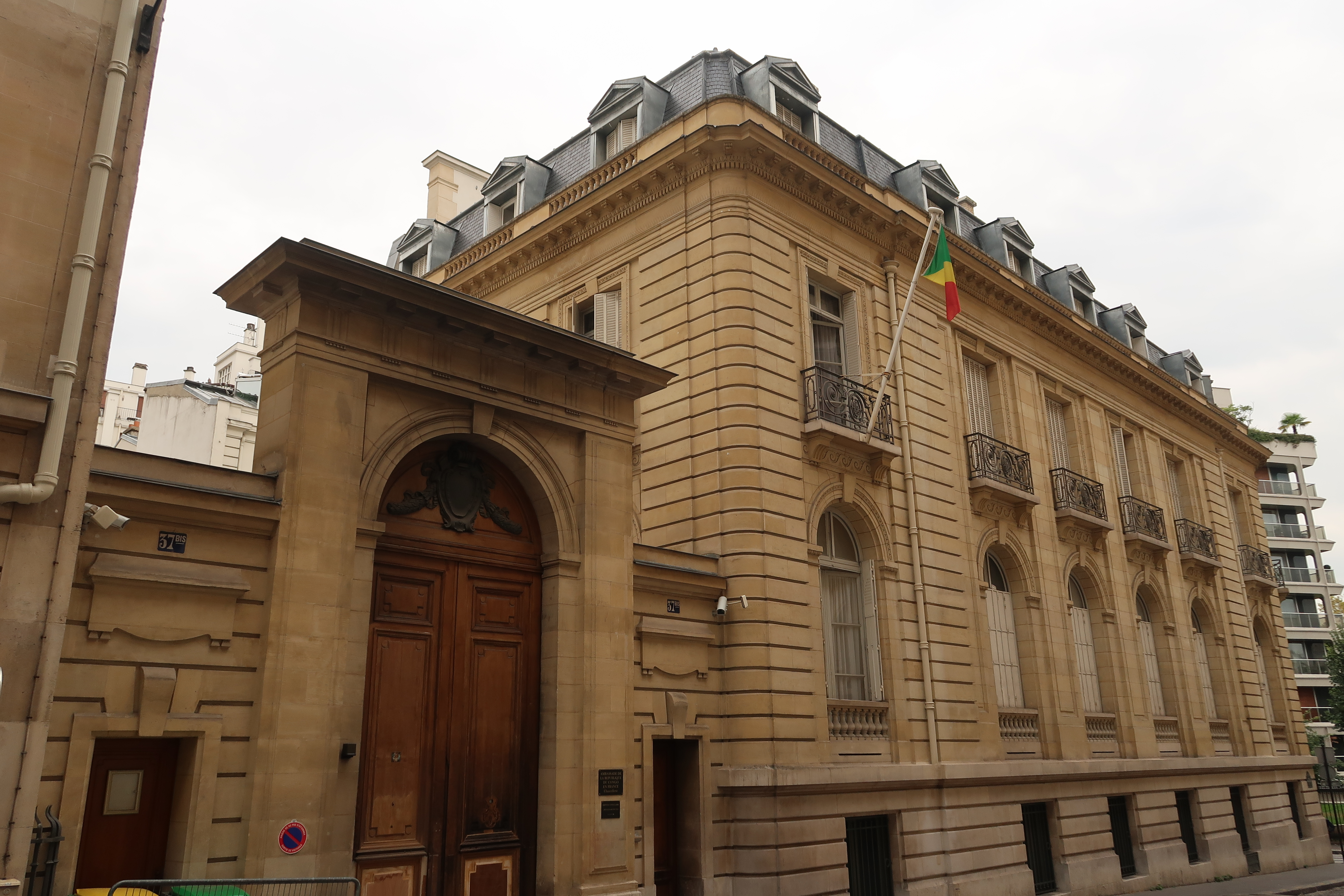
Embassy in Paris

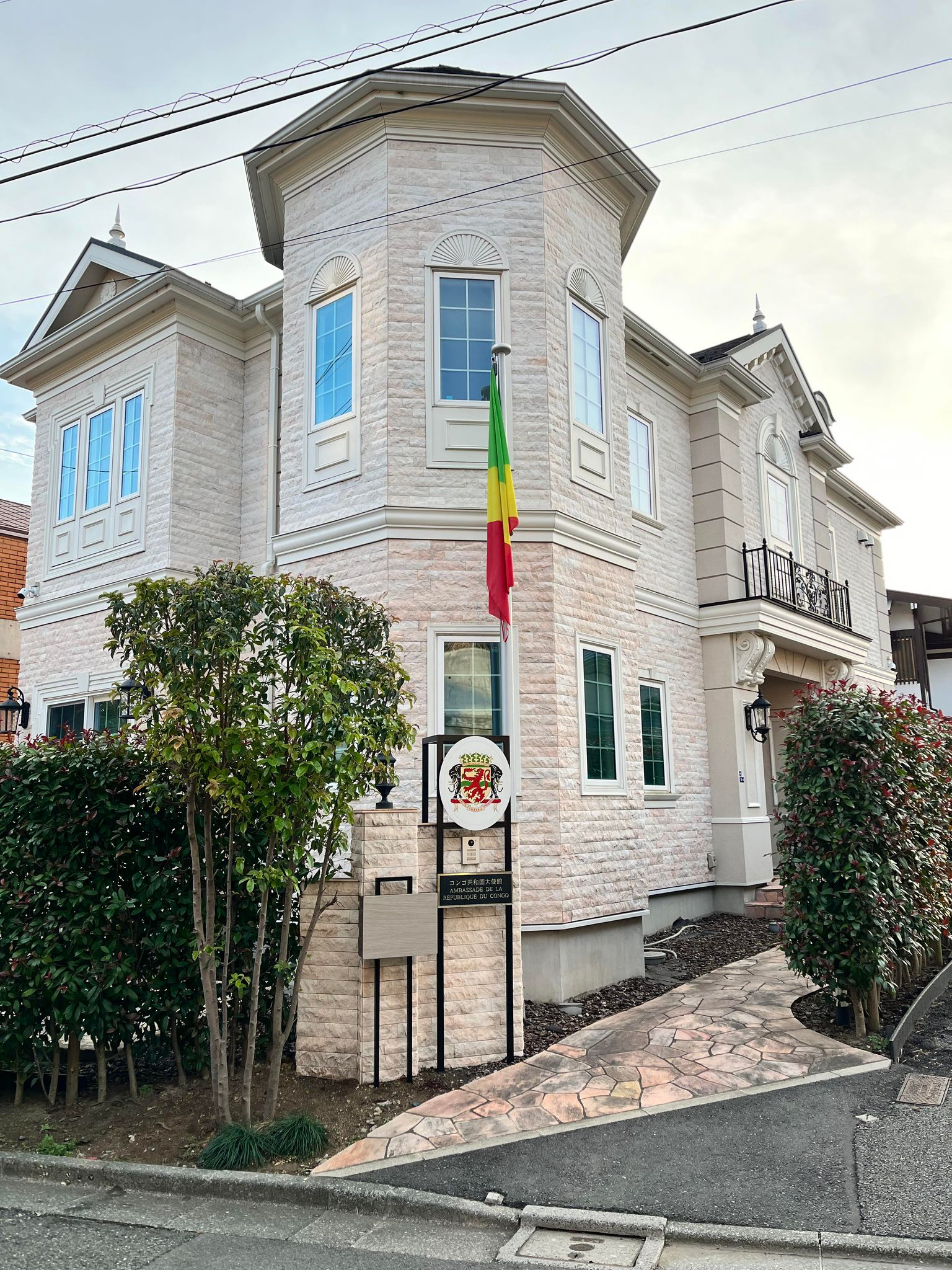
Embassy in Tokyo

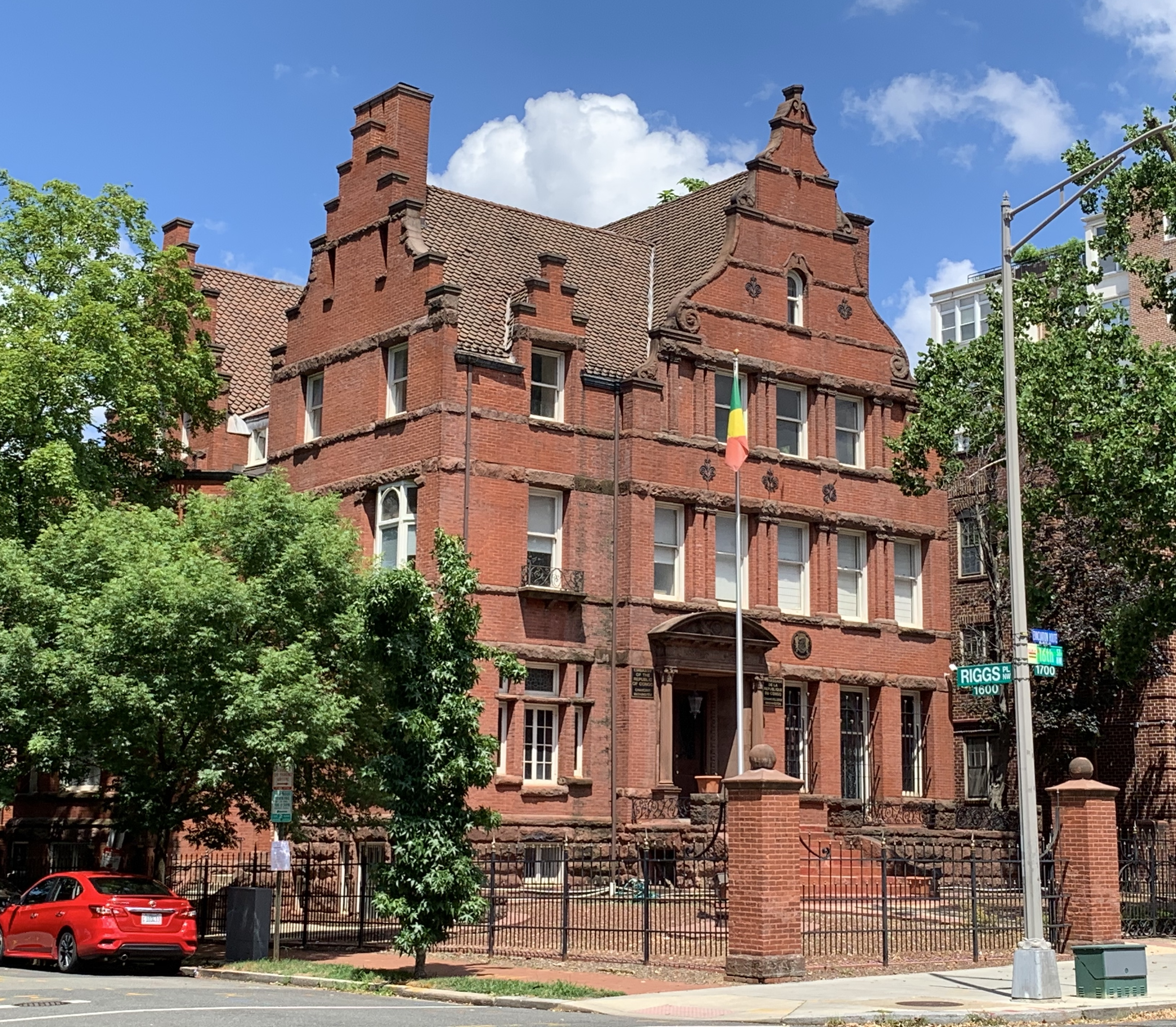
Embassy in Washington, D.C.

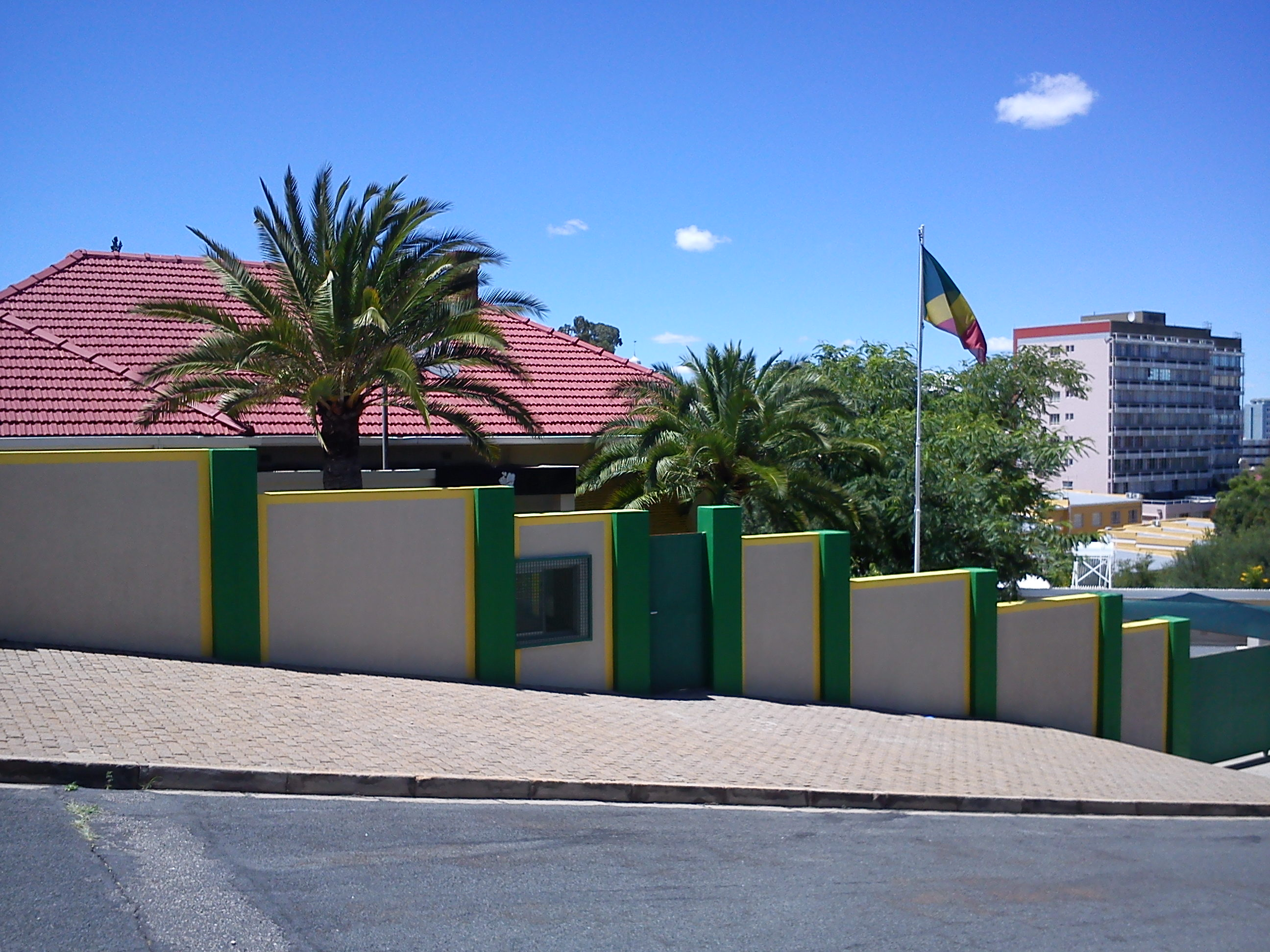
Embassy in Windhoek

== See also ==
- Foreign relations of the Republic of the Congo
- Visa policy of the Republic of the Congo
