= Foreign relations of the Republic of the Congo =

For the two decades preceding the Republic of the Congo's 1991 National Conference, the country was firmly in the socialist camp, allied principally with the Soviet Union and other Eastern bloc nations. Educational, economic, and foreign aid links between Congo and its Eastern bloc allies were extensive, with the Congolese military and security forces receiving significant Soviet, East German, and Cuban assistance.

After the worldwide dissolution of the Soviet Union and Congo's adoption of multi-party democracy in 1991, Congo's bilateral relations with its former socialist allies have become relatively less important. France is now by far Congo's principal external partner, contributing significant amounts of economic assistance, while playing a highly influential role.

Congo-Brazzaville is also a member of the International Criminal Court with a Bilateral Immunity Agreement of protection for the US-military.

Membership in international organizations includes the United Nations, Organisation of African Unity, African Development Bank, General Agreement on Tariffs and Trade (GATT), Economic Commission for Central African States, Central African Customs and Economic Union, International Coffee Organization, Union of Central African States, Intelsat, International Criminal Police Organization - Interpol, Non-Aligned Movement, and Group of 77.

Disputes - international: most of the Congo River boundary with the Democratic Republic of the Congo is indefinite (no agreement has been reached on the division of the river or its islands, except in the Pool Malebo (Stanley Pool) area.

== Diplomatic relations ==
List of countries which the Republic of the Congo maintains diplomatic relations with:

#	Country	Date
1	Germany	15 August 1960
2	United Kingdom	15 August 1960
3	United States	15 August 1960
4	France	16 August 1960
5	Japan	18 August 1960
6	Israel	9 November 1960
7	Belgium	15 April 1961
8	Netherlands	3 August 1961
9	South Korea	21 August 1961
10	Tunisia	1961
11	Canada	February 1962
12	Cameroon	26 November 1962
13	Central African Republic	26 November 1962
14	Sweden	27 September 1962
15	Gabon	November 1962
16	Chad	13 February 1963
—	Holy See	16 February 1963
17	Mali	20 February 1963
18	Algeria	4 January 1964
19	Ghana	8 February 1964
20	China	22 February 1964
21	Russia	16 March 1964
22	Czech Republic	23 March 1964
23	Serbia	28 March 1964
24	Switzerland	21 April 1964
25	Cuba	10 May 1964
26	Vietnam	16 July 1964
27	Egypt	28 July 1964
28	North Korea	24 December 1964
29	Bulgaria	31 December 1964
30	Uganda	1964
31	Nigeria	23 February 1965
32	Italy	20 April 1965
33	Democratic Republic of the Congo	5 November 1965
34	Romania	21 August 1966
35	Mongolia	31 December 1966
36	Finland	22 March 1967
37	Norway	23 May 1967
38	Denmark	10 June 1967
39	Luxembourg	10 June 1967
40	India	26 August 1967
41	Ethiopia	1967
42	Greece	13 May 1968
43	Albania	23 June 1968
44	Guinea	1 July 1968
45	Senegal	9 April 1969
46	Hungary	14 February 1970
47	Sudan	November 1970
48	Mauritania	1970
49	Equatorial Guinea	12 July 1971
50	Chile	1 June 1972
51	Spain	7 December 1972
52	Poland	19 December 1972
53	Zambia	12 January 1973
54	Libya	7 April 1973
55	Portugal	25 January 1975
56	Mozambique	25 June 1975
57	Peru	12 July 1975
58	Pakistan	1975
59	Yemen	25 March 1976
60	Angola	25 July 1976
61	Syria	10 February 1977
62	Cape Verde	1977
63	Austria	12 July 1978
64	Benin	9 September 1978
65	Liberia	10 August 1979
66	Jamaica	6 September 1979
67	Nicaragua	12 September 1979
68	Morocco	1979
69	Argentina	2 January 1980
70	Ecuador	12 February 1980
71	Brazil	4 March 1980
72	Burundi	21 December 1980
73	Tanzania	22 October 1981
74	Turkey	9 November 1981
75	Rwanda	17 August 1982
76	Grenada	1 September 1983
77	Togo	6 August 1984
78	Djibouti	February 1985
79	Iran	25 November 1986
80	Uruguay	22 September 1987
81	Thailand	25 August 1988
—	State of Palestine	6 April 1989
82	Namibia	23 March 1990
83	Mexico	1990
—	Sovereign Military Order of Malta	1992
84	South Africa	22 March 1993
85	Slovakia	30 June 1998
86	Saudi Arabia	1 February 1999
87	Ukraine	3 June 1999
88	Bahrain	9 June 1999
89	Colombia	1 July 1999
90	Kazakhstan	21 September 1999
91	Philippines	19 January 2000
92	Qatar	25 April 2000
93	Brunei	15 May 2000
94	Cambodia	13 September 2000
95	Kuwait	31 October 2000
96	North Macedonia	7 February 2001
97	Singapore	8 February 2001
98	Lebanon	12 April 2001
99	Malaysia	2001
100	Belarus	11 February 2002
101	Iceland	15 December 2004
102	Indonesia	2004
103	Lithuania	5 December 2005
104	Venezuela	6 April 2006
105	Estonia	26 April 2006
106	Timor-Leste	7 November 2006
107	Botswana	9 November 2006
108	Armenia	15 March 2007
109	Paraguay	23 March 2007
110	Slovenia	19 April 2007
111	Croatia	10 May 2007
112	United Arab Emirates	21 May 2007
113	Costa Rica	4 September 2007
114	Ireland	Before April 2008
115	Australia	7 May 2009
116	Montenegro	1 February 2011
117	Malta	14 February 2011
118	Bosnia and Herzegovina	23 February 2011
119	Georgia	3 March 2011
120	Fiji	11 May 2011
121	Mauritius	6 July 2011
122	Sri Lanka	1 February 2012
123	Solomon Islands	6 March 2012
124	Tuvalu	27 April 2012
125	Kenya	28 August 2012
126	Latvia	26 September 2013
127	Monaco	27 February 2014
128	Zimbabwe	27 March 2014
129	Madagascar	17 September 2014
130	Kyrgyzstan	3 February 2016
131	Tajikistan	13 June 2017
132	Azerbaijan	19 March 2018
133	Maldives	20 April 2018
134	San Marino	12 December 2018
135	Bangladesh	12 March 2019
136	Laos	29 August 2019
137	Dominican Republic	16 October 2019
138	Turkmenistan	21 May 2021
139	Guinea-Bissau	26 November 2021
140	Jordan	5 December 2021
141	Andorra	24 February 2022
142	Gambia	17 June 2022
143	Malawi	18 October 2022
144	Comoros	3 February 2023
145	Dominica	25 September 2025
146	Seychelles	24 September 2026
147	Iraq	Unknown
148	Ivory Coast	Unknown
149	Niger	Unknown
150	São Tomé and Príncipe	Unknown

== Bilateral relations ==
Country	Formal relations began	Notes
Canada	February 1962	Both countries established diplomatic relations in February 1962: Canada is accredited to the Republic of the Congo from its embassy in Kinshasa, Democratic Republic of Congo.; Republic of the Congo is accredited to Canada from its embassy in Washington, D.C., United States.
China	22 February 1964	See China-Republic of the Congo relations On February 22, 1964, China established diplomatic relations with the Republic of Congo.
Finland	22 March 1967	Both countries established diplomatic relations on 22 March 1967 See Finland-Republic of the Congo relations
France	16 August 1960	Both countries established diplomatic relations on 16 August 1960: Republic of the Congo has an embassy in Paris.; France has an embassy in Brazzaville and a consulate-general in Pointe-Noire.
India	26 August 1967	See Republic of Congo–India relations Both countries established diplomatic relations on 26 August 1967.: India maintains an embassy in Brazzaville since 2021.; Republic of the Congo maintains an embassy in New Delhi.
Israel	9 November 1960	Both countries established diplomatic relations on 9 November 1960 when Ram Yaron was appointed first Israel ambassador at Brazzaville. But Congo severance diplomatic relations with Israel on 31 December 1972. Diplomatic relations were restored between them on 14 July 1991.
Mexico	1990	Both countries established diplomatic relations in 1990: Republic of the Congo is accredited to Mexico from its embassy in Washington, D.C., United States.; Mexico is accredited to the Republic of the Congo from its embassy in Abuja, Nigeria
Namibia	23 March 1990	Both countries established diplomatic relations on 23 March 1990: Congo has an embassy in Windhoek.; Namibia has an embassy in Brazzaville.
Poland	19 December 1972	Both countries established diplomatic relations on 19 December 1972 See Poland-Republic of the Congo relations
Portugal	25 May 1961	Both countries established diplomatic relations on 25 May 1961 when first Ambassador of Portugal with residence in Brazzaville Mr. Gonçalo Correia Caldeira Coelho presented his credentials, but 17 August 1965 Congo severing diplomatic relations with Portugal. Diplomatic ties re-established on 25 January 1975
Russia	16 March 1964	Both countries established diplomatic relations on 16 March 1964 The Republic of the Congo has no embassy in Moscow. Russia has an embassy in Brazzaville.
Senegal	9 April 1969	Both countries established diplomatic relations on 9 April 1969 when Ambassador of Senegal to Congo (Brazzaville) (resident in Kinshasa) Mr. Mademba Sy presented his credentials to Head of State Major Marien Ngouabi
South Korea	21 August 1961	The diplomatic relations between the South Korea and the Republic of the Congo were established on 21 August 1961. Bilateral trade in 2011 totalled $52,940,000 exports, and $78,100,000 imports. The Congo was a major oil exporter to Korea.
Tanzania	22 October 1981	Both countries established diplomatic relations on 22 October 1981 when Ambassador of Tanzania to Congo Mme. Tato Nuru presented his letters of credentials to President of Congo Denis Sassou Nguesso.
Togo	1968	The two countries maintain diplomatic relations and Togolese President Faure Gnassingbé visited the Republic of the Congo in November 2023 meeting President Denis Sassou Nguesso.
Turkey	9 November 1981	Both countries established diplomatic relations on 9 November 1981: Congo has an embassy in Ankara.; Turkey has an embassy in Brazzaville.; Trade volume between the two countries was 57.25 million USD in 2019 (Turkish exports/imports: 1.47/55.8 million USD).
United Kingdom	1960	See Foreign relations of the United Kingdom The Congo established diplomatic relations with the United Kingdom on 9 December 1960.: The Republic of the Congo maintains an embassy in London.; The United Kingdom is not accredited to the Republic of the Congo through an embassy; the UK develops relations through its embassy in Kinshasa, DR Congo.; Both countries share common membership of the Atlantic co-operation pact, the International Criminal Court, and the World Trade Organization. Bilaterally the two countries have an Investment Agreement.
United States	15 August 1960	Both countries established diplomatic relations on 15 August 1960 See Republic of the Congo-United States relations Diplomatic relations between the United States and Congo were broken during the most radical Congolese-Marxist period, 1965–77. The U.S. Embassy reopened in 1977 with the restoration of relations, which remained distant until the end of the socialist era. The late 1980s were marked by a progressive warming of Congolese relations with Western countries, including the United States. Congolese President Denis Sassou-Nguesso made a state visit to Washington in 1990, where he was received by President George H. W. Bush.: Republic of the Congo has an embassy in Washington, D.C.; United States has an embassy in Brazzaville.
Zambia	12 January 1973	Both countries established diplomatic relations on 12 January 1973 when the first Zambian Ambassador to the Congo People's Republic (resident in Kinshasa), M. Chalikulima, presented his credentials to President Ngouabi

== See also ==
- List of diplomatic missions in the Republic of the Congo
- List of diplomatic missions of the Republic of the Congo
- Visa requirements for Republic of the Congo citizens
