= Kayes, Republic of the Congo =

Kayes
- Location in the Republic of the Congo
- Coordinates: 4°10′6″S 13°17′36″E
- Country: Republic of the Congo
- Department: Bouenza
- District: Kayes

Kayes is a small town in the Bouenza Department of the Republic of the Congo. It is located about 2 km (1.2 miles) north of Nkayi, the country’s fourth largest city. Kayes is also the name of a district, of which the town of Kayes is the capital (chef-lieu).

The district of Kayes has population of 13,123 as of 2007. It is bordered to the east by the Madingou District, to the west by the Loudima District. At least 21 villages or sub-districts are located in the Kayes area, including Kayes, Dakar, Kilounga, Kimpalanga, Kimpambou, Kiossi (Kiosi), Kimbaouka (Kimbaoka), and Moutela. According to one paper on Tsetse control published in 1986, the population of the town of Kayes was around 1,500 at that time.

The town lies between the south bank of the Niari River and the north bank of the Livouba River, a tributary of the Niari. The Livouba joins the Niari about 2 km northwest of Kayes. The distance between the two rivers at Kayes is around 1–2 km.

Although Kayes and Nkayi are very near each other, they are different areas, separated by the Livouba River, belonging to different municipalities. Kayes is the capital of the Kayes District, while Nkayi is an independent commune not belonging to any district, with more than five times the population of the whole Kayes District. In the past there was a district called Nkayi, which seems to have included both the present-day Nkayi Commune and Kayes District.

Nkayi station of the Congo–Ocean Railway, a narrow gauge railway connecting Brazzaville to Pointe-Noire, is in the southern part of Nkayi, roughly 3 km (2 miles) south of Kayes.

There are several other places in Congo with the same or similar names, such as Madingo-Kayes in Kouilou, Londéla-Kayes in Niari, and Kimpambou-Kayes.

== See also ==
- Transport in the Republic of the Congo
- Railway stations in Congo
