= List of airports in the Republic of the Congo =

This is a list of airports in the Republic of the Congo, sorted by location.

Location	ICAO	IATA	Airport name
Bétou	FCOT	BTB	Bétou Airport
Boundji	FCOB	BOE	Boundji Airport
Brazzaville	FCBB	BZV	Maya-Maya Airport
Djambala	FCBD	DJM	Djambala Airport
Dolisie	FCPL	DIS	Dolisie Airport
Enyellé			Enyellé Airport
Ewo	FCOE	EWO	Ewo Airport
Gamboma	FCOG	GMM	Gamboma Airport
Impfondo	FCOI	ION	Impfondo Airport
Kelle	FCOK	KEE	Kelle Airport
Kindamba	FCBK	KNJ	Kindamba Airport
Makabana	FCPA	KMK	Makabana Airport
Makoua	FCOM	MKJ	Makoua Airport
Mossendjo	FCMM	MSX	Mossendjo Airport
Mouyondzi	FCBM	MUY	Mouyondzi Airport - closed
Nkayi	FCBY	NKY	Yokangassi Airport
Oyo	FCOD	OLL	Oyo Ollombo Airport
Okoyo		OKG	Okoyo Airport
Ouesso	FCOU	OUE	Ouésso Airport
Owando	FCOO	FTX	Owando Airport
Pointe-Noire	FCPP	PNR	Agostinho-Neto International Airport
Sibiti	FCBS	SIB	Sibiti Airport
Souanké	FCOS	SOE	Souanké Airport
Zanaga	FCBZ	ANJ	Zanaga Airport
Airports with unverified coordinates
Akana	FCBL	LCO	Lague Airport

== See also ==
- Transport in the Republic of the Congo
- List of airports by ICAO code: F#FC - Republic of the Congo (ROC), formerly known as Congo
- Wikipedia: WikiProject Aviation/Airline destination lists: Africa#Congo
