= Hinda, Republic of the Congo =

Hinda
- Town
- Location within Republic of the Congo
- Coordinates: 4°37′0″S 12°2′26″E
- Country: Republic of the Congo
- Department: Kouilou
- District: Hinda District
- Elevation: 34 m (112 ft)

Hinda is a small town in the Republic of the Congo. It is the seat of the Hinda District.

It was the capital of Kouilou Department until 2011 when it was replaced by Loango.

== Transport ==
It is served by a station on the Congo-Ocean Railway.

== See also ==
- Railway stations in Congo
