= Nkayi =

- Nkayi, Republic of the Congo
- Nkayi, Zimbabwe
- Nkayi District, Republic of the Congo
- Nkayi District, Zimbabwe
- Roman Catholic Diocese of Nkayi, Republic of the Congo
