= Conkouati-Douli National Park =

National Park in the Republic of the Congo

- IUCN category II (national park)
- Location within Republic of the Congo
- Location: Kouilou, Republic of the Congo
- Coordinates: 3.905°S 11.47°E
- Area: 5,049.5 km^{2}
- Established: 14 August 1999
- Governing body: Ministry for National Forestry Commission

The Conkouati-Douli National Park is a UNESCO-recognised coastal national park in the Republic of the Congo. The park's main activities include community outreach, biological research and tourism development. It was established by the Presidential Decree No. 99–136 on 14 August 1999.

== Administration ==
Conkouati-Douli National Park is managed by the Ministry of Forest Economy and Sustainable Development (MEFDD), in partnership with the NGO Noé, a non-profit conservation organisation, created in 2001.

In addition to the Ministry of Forest Economy, institutional partners include the Congolese Agency for Wildlife and Protected Areas (ACFAP), Ministries of Agriculture, Fisheries and Livestock (MAEP), and Environment, Tourism, Scientific Research, National Navy and the Judiciary. Concerning the technical and financial partners, there are, in addition to private financiers, WCS, African Parks Network, JGI Congo, HELP/Beauval, Renatura, ESI Congo, the European Union, AFD and USFWS.

== History ==
The Conkouati-Douli National Park was established in 1999. However, it has been part of an active area of conservation since at least 1980 and includes areas of the former old reserve of Conkouati. The original reserve covered nearly 300,000 ha but was reduced to 144,294 ha by a legal provision in 1989.

From 1994 to 1999 the IUCN recognised that the area was critically endangered and collaborated with PROGECAP-GEF Congo with financing from the World Bank in agreement with the Congolese authorities until June 1999. The responsibilities of the two partners are recorded in a memorandum of understanding (20-year management mandate, signed on 13 April 2021).

Since being promoted to a national park, Conkouati-Douli has been managed by the Ministry for National Forestry Commission in partnership with the Wildlife Conservation Society (WCS) since 1999., until the conclusion of their partnership in 2018.

This transition paved the way for Noé, a conservation organisation, to step in and continue the park's conservation initiatives beginning in 2019. The culmination of these efforts was marked by the signing of a public-private partnership agreement (PPP) in 2021, signaling a renewed commitment to biodiversity conservation, sustainable development and community involvement within the Conkouati-Douli National Park

The park is an important part of native local culture. Some 7,800 people lived in and around the park divided into 31 villages. The coastal residents are mainly Vili people, an ethnic group of fishers and traders that settled there in the 13th century. The villages along the forest road contain a mix of over 30 different ethnic groups who came with the industrial forestry sector and settled fewer than 100 years ago.

== Geography ==
The park occupies an area of 7,955 km^{2} (3,071 sq mi), including 4,121 km^{2} (1,591 sq mi) of marine park and 3,833 km^{2} (1,480 sq mi) of land in the Kouilou Department, straddling the districts of Nzambi and Madingo Kayes. It is located near the villages of Cotovindou and Louléma along the border between Congo and Gabon, at the point of intersection with National Route 5. It is divided into three zones:

1. An integrally protected zone that is only legally accessible to park staff, guided paying tourists and researchers with valid permits;
2. An eco-development zone containing all legal human habitations, in which residents are allowed to use natural resources sustainably for subsistence, and in which industrial exploitation is allowed with the agreement of the appropriate government institutions;
3. A 5 km wide buffer zone around the park designated for environmental education, sensitisation efforts and socio-economic activities.

== Environment ==
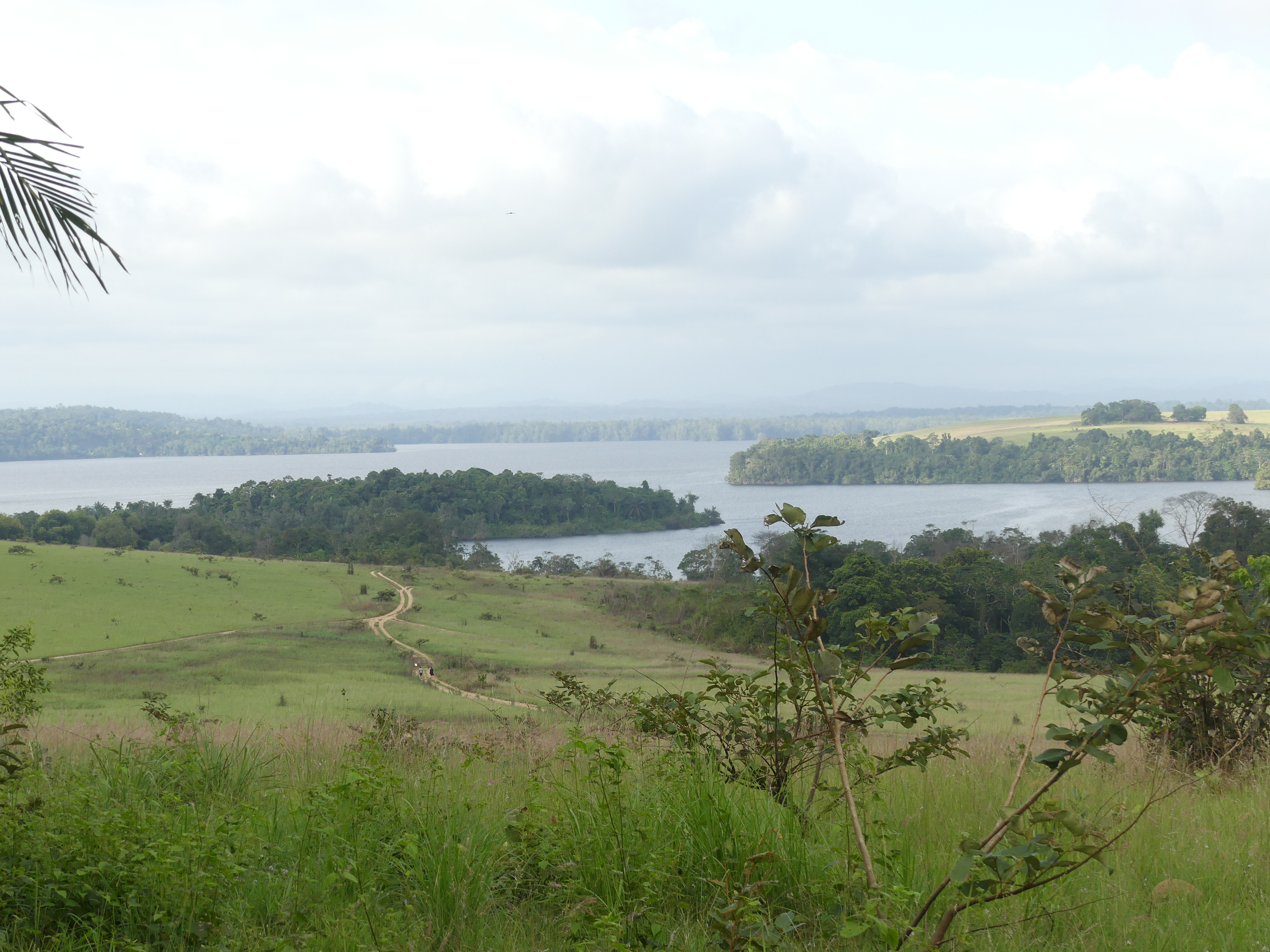
Park landscape

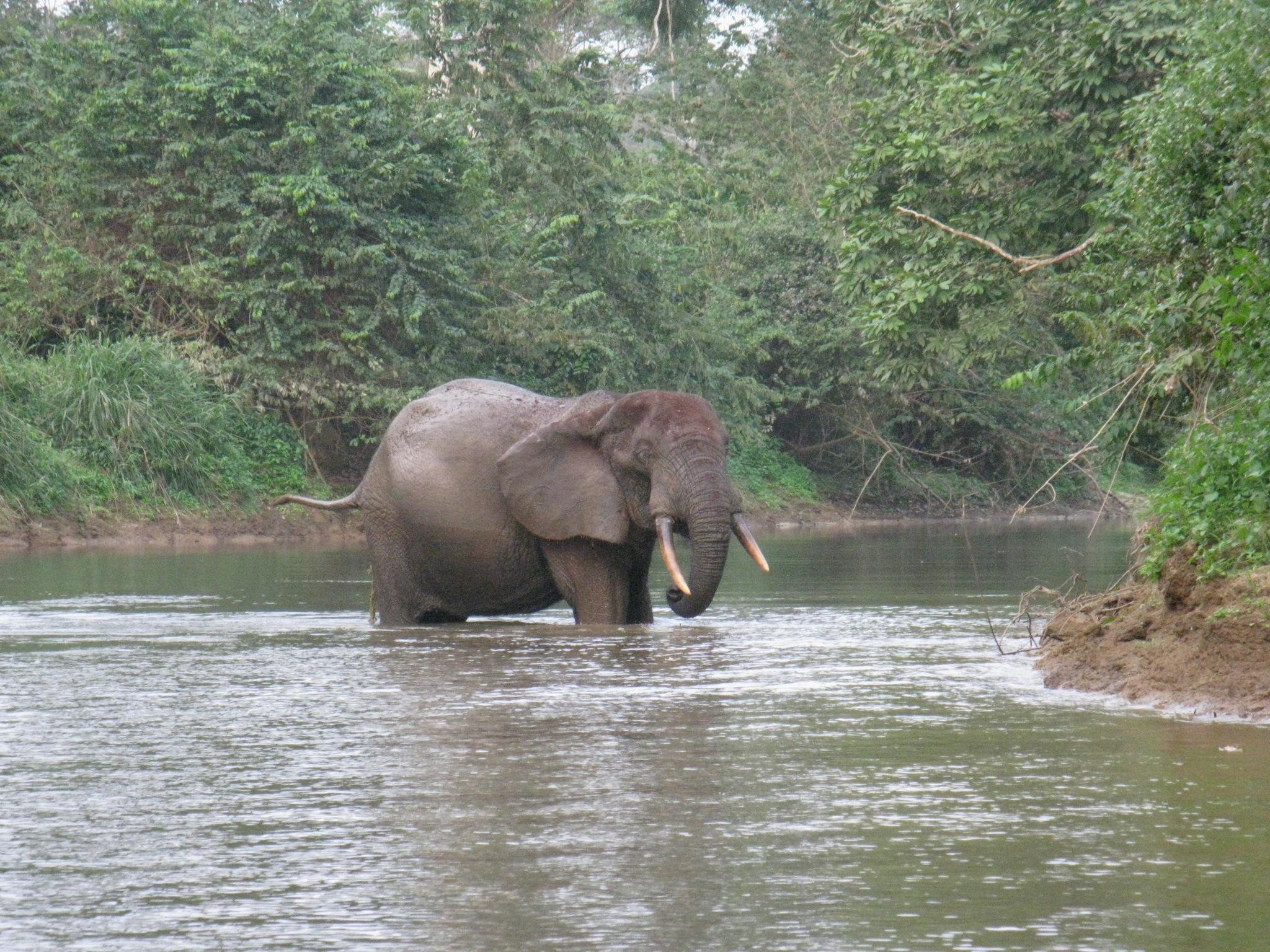
Forest elephant in the park

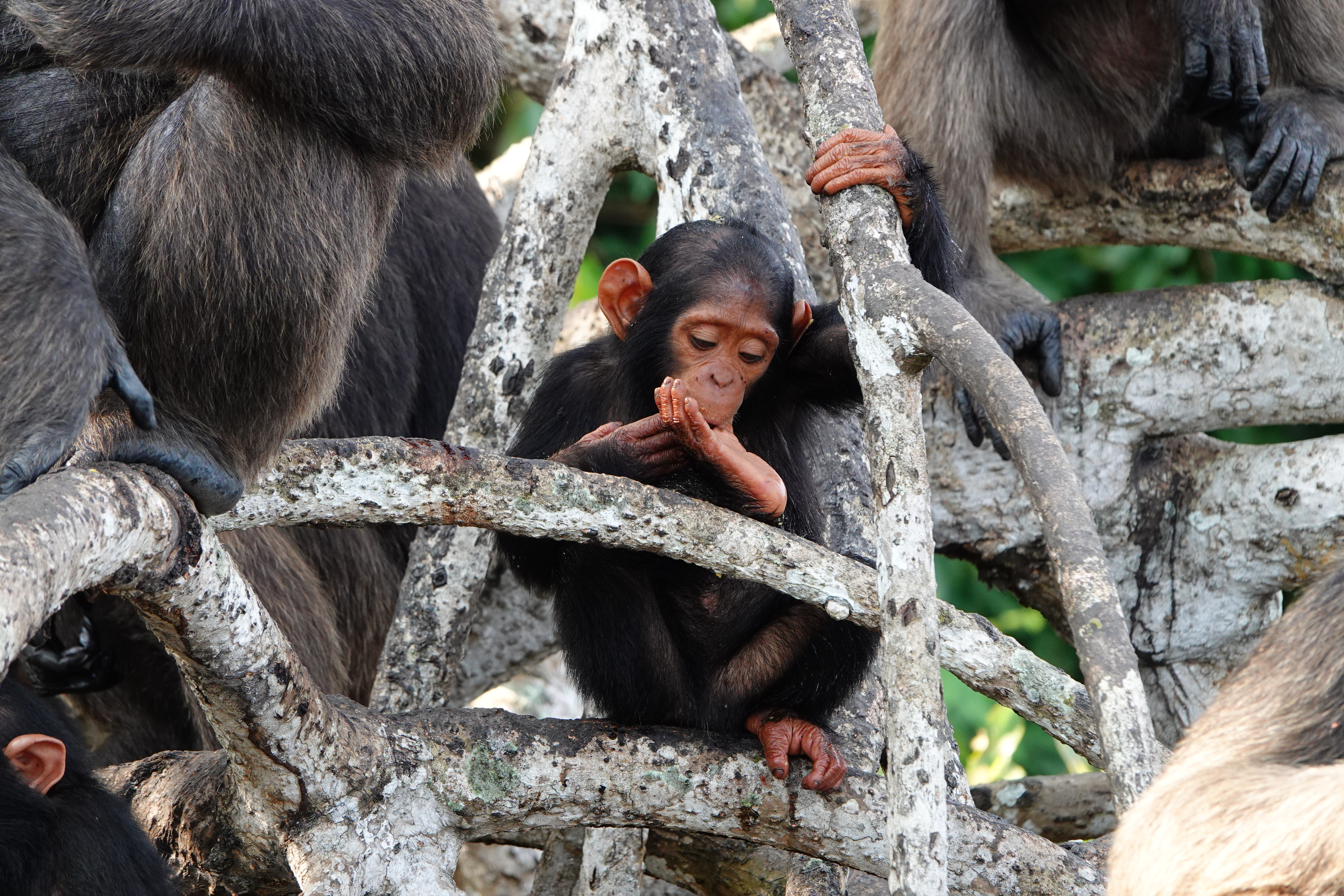
Chimpanzees in the park mangroves

=== Flora ===
Conkouati-Douli National Park is the most biodiverse park in the country and includes the only protected marine area in Congo. The Noumbi River flows through the park, which is characterised by dense forests, mixed with wetlands, floodplain forests and lagoons. Rhizophora racemosa and Avicennia germinans are common mangroves in the park. Aquatic vegetation in lakes and lagoons is composed of Vossia cuspidata and Ctenium newtonili. The savannas of the south-west are dominated by Ctenium newtonii, Elytonrus brazzae and Pobeguinea arrecta, while those of Cotovindou in the north-east are made up of Hyparrhenia diplandra, Panicum phragmitoides and Pobeguinea arrecta.

=== Fauna ===
The park has fauna typical of forest ecosystems of the Congo. It is a priority site for great apes in the IUCN great ape conservation action plan as it is home to around 7,000 central chimpanzees and 900 western lowland gorillas, as well as buffaloes, leopards, red river hogs, sitatungas and mandrills. It is also home to 900 forest elephants and is a Ramsar site for its importance for migratory and wetland birds. The park has been designated an Important Bird Area (IBA) by BirdLife International because it supports significant populations of many bird species.

The park also has endangered turtle and dolphin populations. Its beaches are among the most important in the world for nesting of leatherback sea turtles. The marine park also includes a group of around 100 humpback dolphins.

=== Threats ===
Local ecosystems are vulnerable to industrial threats from logging, mining, petroleum production, and commercial fishing.

Additionally, poachers commonly use the coastal and south-east forest roads traversing the park to gain access to rare animals such as elephants.

The local human population is low but the nearby city of Pointe-Noire (150 km from the park) fuels natural resource exploitation to feed the growing demands for bushmeat and wood.

Chinese-owned trawler boats are a serious threat to the marine park. Local threats include unsustainable fishing, hunting and agriculture techniques.

Since the begin of 2024 the oil company Congo Holding United, a company majority-owned by China Oil Natural Gas Overseas Holding United plans to drill for oil near and inside the Conkouati-Douli Nationalpark. This is a massive risk for rich biodiversity and indigenous people living there.
