= NKY =

NKY may refer to:

- Northern Kentucky, a geographical region in the United States
- Yokangassi Airport, an airport in the Republic of the Congo with that IATA airport code
