= Mossendjo =

- Location in the Republic of the Congo
- Coordinates: 2°56′43″S 12°42′56″E
- Country: Republic of the Congo
- Department: Niari Department
- District: Moutamba District
- Commune: Mossendjo

Area
  - Total: 5.2 km^{2} (2.0 sq mi)
- Elevation: 529 m (1,736 ft)

Population (2023 census)
  - Total: 15,003
  - Density: 2,900/km^{2} (7,500/sq mi)

Mossendjo (can also be written as Mosenjo or Mosendjo) is a town and a commune located in the Niari Department of the Republic of the Congo. It is located in the heart of the Chaillu Massif, a mountain and forest range that starts in eastern Gabon and meets the Mayombe mountain ranges.

== Administration ==
Mossendjo was divided into 2 urban boroughs (arrondissements):

1. Bouali
2. Itsibou

== Demographics ==
With a population of over 15,003 as of 2023, the city is home to several ethnic groups, including:

- the Tsangui, the largest ethnic group;
- the Punu, the second largest ethnic group, predominant in eastern Gabon in the Niari region (they are also found in Nianga and Divenié);
- the Teke, the third largest group;
- the Banba, the Kougni, and the Kota, which constitute the city's minority groups.

== Transport ==
=== Railways ===
The town lies on the Mbinda branch of the Congo railway system.

== Infrastructure ==
Mossendjo is a town of 15,003 people according to 2023 census. It is the regional hub city of the Chaillu Massif mountainous region, north of Dolisie and south of Mayoko and Mbinda. The infrastructure of Mossendjo has been improved since 2006, owing to the Congo government's program of revitalizing Mossendjo and Dolisie. New streets and sewage drainage systems have been constructed in both cities.

Mossendjo Airport has regularly scheduled airline service to Pointe-Noire and Brazzaville, via Air Maouene. Road access to Dolisie and Mayoko still is via rough, sometimes graded dirt roads. The region has cell phone coverage service by TelCel.

== Economy ==
The main activity in the town is forestry, an activity which began around the start of the 20th century and reached its peak around the 1930s and 1940s during the construction of the railway linking Dolisie to Mbinda (a border town with Gabon).

Until the colonial period, the primary activities of this town were hunting, gathering, and fishing. The 1970s and 1980s were marked by the transit of manganese, which left Dédé-Gabon for Makabana, Mont Belot, and then Pointe-Noire.

== Culture ==
A matriarchal society predominates. The social organization is based on the clan, rather than the ethnic group, which is the center of the family.

Traditional dance remains widely practiced.

== Religion ==
Two major Christian denominations define the city's religious life: Protestantism and Catholicism. The first churches were built by Protestants; the Protestant mission built the first schools.

Local religions (Dzobi, Mukala) remain relevant, as in many African countries; syncretism is also widespread.

== See also ==
- Railway stations in Congo
