= Yokangassi Airport =

Airport in the Republic of the Congo

- IATA: NKY; ICAO: FCBY

Summary
- Serves: Nkayi, Republic of the Congo
- Elevation AMSL: 541 ft / 165 m
- Coordinates: 4°13′20″S 13°17′15″E

Map
- Location in the Republic of the Congo

Runways
Direction	Length		Surface
Direction	m	ft	Surface
09/27	2,200	7,218	Dirt
- Source: GCM Google Maps

Yokangassi Airport (IATA: NKY, ICAO: FCBY) is an airport serving the town of Nkayi in Bouenza Department, Republic of the Congo. The runway is 3.4 kilometres (2.1 mi) south of the town.

== See also ==
- List of airports in the Republic of the Congo
- Transport in the Republic of the Congo
