= Dimonika Biosphere Reserve =

Protected area in the Republic of the Congo

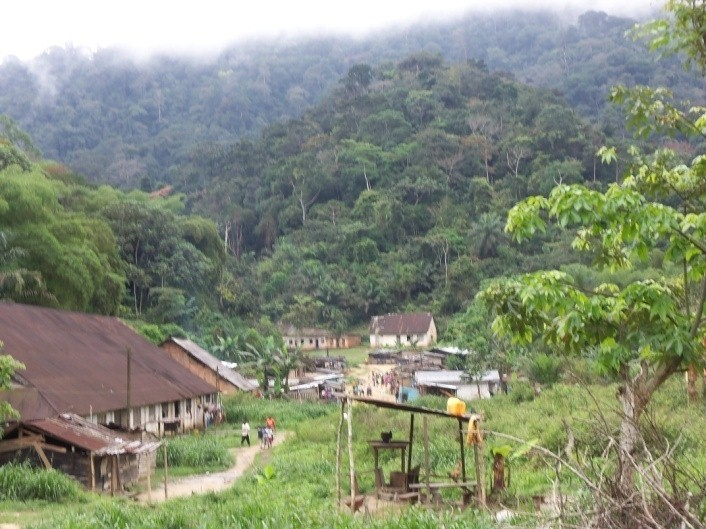
- Dimonika landscape

- Location within Republic of the Congo
- Coordinates: 4°10′0.125″S 12°25′0.120″E
- Area: 136,000 hectares (530 sq mi)
- Established: 1988
- Governing body: Réserve de la biosphère de Dimonika

The Dimonika Biosphere Reserve (French: Réserve de la biosphère de Dimonika) (established 1988) is a UNESCO Biosphere Reserve in the Republic of the Congo.

== Geography and environment ==
The 136,000 hectares (530 sq mi) reserve is located in the central Mayombe mountain chain about 50 km (31 mi) from the Atlantic coast.

The Mayombe has a hot, humid climate, combining tropical and oceanic traits. A lowland Guineo-Congolese rainforest dominates the biosphere reserve together with savanna vegetation. The area is in the transition zone between semi-deciduous and evergreen forest. Of special scientific interest are various types of forest communities recolonising old areas of forest exploitation.

=== Wildlife ===
The fauna within the biosphere reserve is diverse and varied. Mammals occurring in the reserve include African bush elephants, African forest buffaloes, western gorillas and chimpanzees. The reserve has been designated an Important Bird Area (IBA) by BirdLife International because it supports significant populations of many bird species.

=== Human activities ===
Compared to other rural areas of Congo, the Mayombe Mountains are densely populated. Many migrants from neighboring regions, Angola and the Democratic Republic of the Congo have settled within the biosphere reserve. As of 1984, there were 19,000 inhabitants in the Sous-prefécture de M’Vouti. Their main activities are subsistence agriculture, hunting, fishing and gold extraction.

The "Mayombe Project" aimed at improving the communication between local stakeholders, managers and scientists. In 1991, a survey was issued to determine perceptions and expectations of the biosphere reserve inhabitants. Research has been carried out on the impact of gold extraction on the biosphere reserve.

== Sources ==
This article incorporates text from a free content work (license statement/permission). Text taken from UNESCO - MAB Biosphere Reserves Directory, UNESCO, UNESCO.
