= List of airports in Congo =

List of airports in Congo may refer to:

- List of airports in the Democratic Republic of the Congo
- List of airports in the Republic of the Congo
