= Loudima =

- Location in the Republic of the Congo
- Coordinates: 4°6′44″S 13°3′36″E
- Country: Republic of the Congo
- Department: Bouenza
- District: Loudima

Population (2023 census)
  - Total: 21,623

Loudima (can also be written as Ludima) is a town in the southern part of the Republic of Congo, in the Loudima District of the Bouenza Department. The town has about 20,000 inhabitants.

== Transport ==
It is served by a station on the national railway system, and is to the east of the junction of the branch line to Mbinda.

== See also ==
- Railway stations in Congo
