= MSX (disambiguation) =

MSX is a computer standard.

MSX may also refer to:

- MSX, a disease caused by the Haplosporidium nelsoni pathogen of oysters
- Metal Slug X, a video game
- Midcourse Space Experiment, an infrared satellite telescope
- MSX, IATA code for Mossendjo Airport in the Republic of the Congo
- Stanford MSx, a management program at Stanford University, formerly known as the Sloan Fellows Program
