= Owando Airport =

- IATA: FTX; ICAO: FCOO

Summary
- Airport type: Public / Military
- Location: Owando, Republic of the Congo
- Elevation AMSL: 1,214 ft / 370 m
- Coordinates: 0°31′20″S 15°56′10″E

Map
- Location in Republic of the Congo

Runways
Direction	Length		Surface
Direction	m	ft	Surface
14/32	2,050	6,726	Asphalt
- Source: Google Maps GCM

Owando Airport (IATA: FTX, ICAO: FCOO) is an airport serving the town of Owando, the capital of the Cuvette Department in the Republic of the Congo.

The airport is 4 kilometres (2.5 mi) southeast of the town. The disused Runway 09/27 abuts the southeast end of the new runway.

== See also ==
- List of airports in the Republic of the Congo
- Transport in the Republic of the Congo
