= Madingou, Bouenza =

Madingou
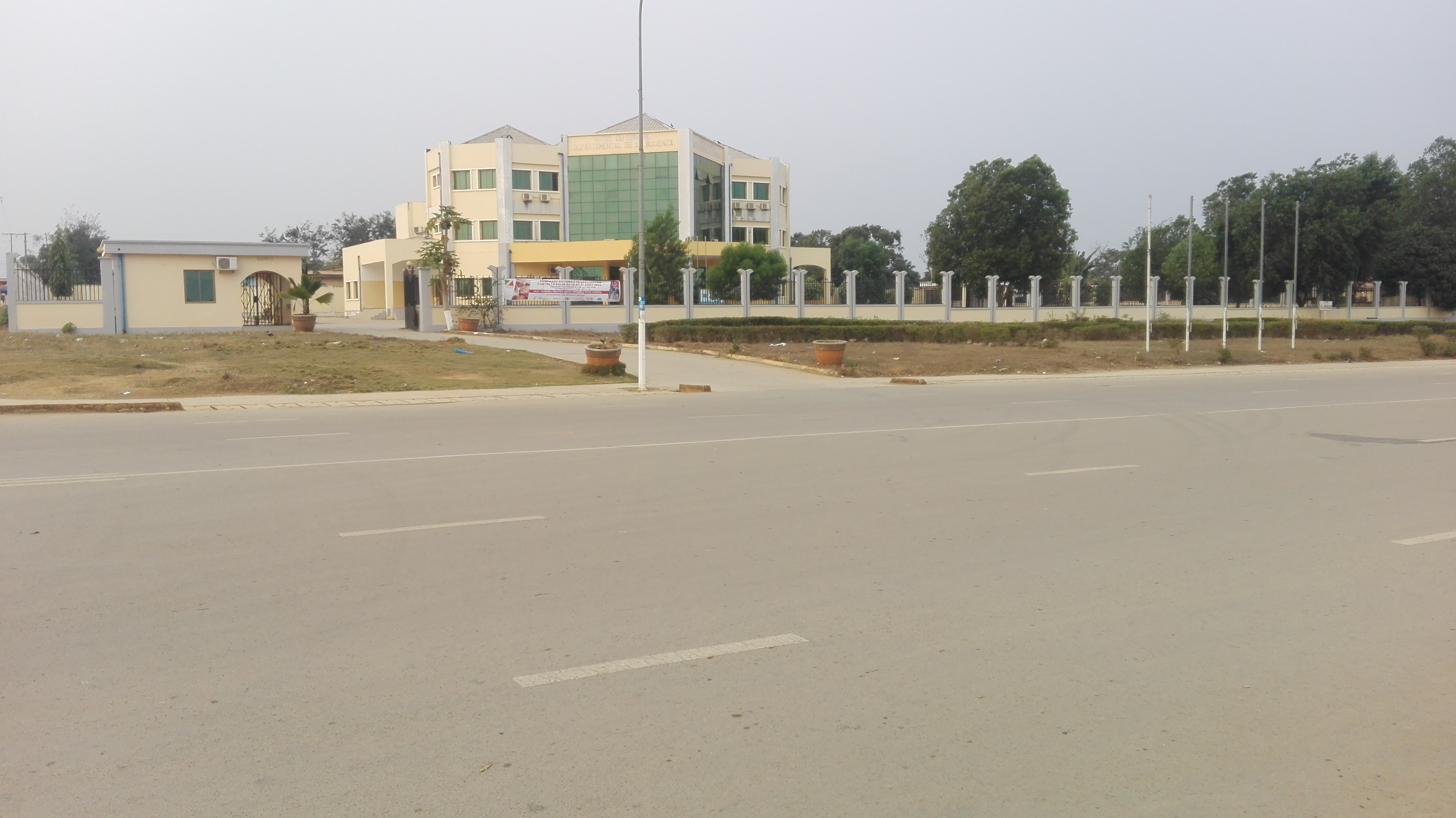
- Bouénza Department Council

- Location in the Republic of the Congo
- Coordinates: 04°09′51″S 13°33′06″E
- Country: Republic of the Congo
- Department: Bouenza Department
- District: Madingou District
- Commune: Madingou
- Elevation: 190 m (620 ft)

Population (2023 census)
  - Total: 43,787

Madingou (can also be written as Madingu) is a town and a commune located in the central Republic of Congo located in southern Republic of the Congo. It is the capital city of the Madingou District and the Bouenza Department.

== Transport ==
It is served by a station on the Congo-Ocean Railway.
