= Nkayi District =

Nkayi District may refer to:

- Nkayi District, Congo
- Nkayi District, Zimbabwe
