= Moutamba District =

Moutamba
- District
- Interactive map of Moutamba
- Country: Republic of the Congo
- Region: Niari Region

Area
  - Total: 1,264 sq mi (3,274 km^{2})

Population (2023 census)
  - Total: 22,936
  - Density: 18.14/sq mi (7.005/km^{2})
- Time zone: UTC+1 (GMT +1)

Moutamba (can also be written as Mutamba) is a district in the Niari Region of south-western Republic of the Congo. The capital lies at Mossendjo.

The district was created from Mossendjo District in 1984.

== Towns and villages ==
- Mossendjo
- Moutamba
