= Dolisie =

Dolisie (Loubomo)
- Location in the Republic of the Congo
- Coordinates: 4°12′2″S 12°40′45″E
- Country: Republic of the Congo
- Department: Niari Department
- District: Louvakou District
- Commune: Dolisie
- Founded: 1934
- Founder: Albert Dolisie

Area
  - Total: 18.3 km^{2} (7.1 sq mi)
  - Land: 18.3 km^{2} (7.1 sq mi)
- Elevation: 290 m (950 ft)

Population (2023 census)
  - Total: 178,172
  - Density: 9,740/km^{2} (25,200/sq mi)
- Area code: 242

Dolisie, known as Loubomo (or Lubomo) between 1975 and 1991, is a city and a commune. It is the capital of Niari in the south western of the Republic of the Congo, the country's third largest city and an important commercial centre. The city lies on the eastern edge of the coastal rainforest and has a population of 178,172 (2023 census).

Dolisie is divided into 2 urban boroughs (arrondissements): Foundou-Foundou and Youlou-Poungui.

== History ==
The city was founded as a station on the Congo-Ocean Railway, and it was named after Pierre Savorgnan de Brazza's lieutenant Albert Dolisie.

It became a thriving city thanks to the wealth of the railway, and had 20,000 inhabitants in 1972. The city's name changed to Loubomo in 1975, and it became the third largest city in Congo-Brazzaville. The civil war of the late 1990s caused an exodus of rural people toward cities, and Loubomo's population has significantly increased since then.

== Economy ==
Dolisie is a major rail center. Its location marks the link between the east-west Congo-Ocean Railway and the Mbinda line which runs north to the border with Gabon at Mbinda. Dolisie is also home to numerous small industries (wood, lumber).

== Transport ==
Dolisie is home to Dolisie Airport.

Dolisie-Loubomo railway station on the Congo–Ocean Railway provides daily rail service to Pointe-Noire, Brazzaville and intermediate points.

== International relations ==
=== Twin towns – Sister cities ===
Dolisie is twinned with:

- Riom, France

== Climate ==
Dolisie has a tropical savanna climate (Aw) according to the Köppen climate classification.

Climate data for Dolisie (1991-2020)
Month	Jan	Feb	Mar	Apr	May	Jun	Jul	Aug	Sep	Oct	Nov	Dec	Year
Daily mean °C (°F)	25.8 (78.4)	26.1 (79.0)	26.4 (79.5)	26.3 (79.3)	25.7 (78.3)	23.7 (74.7)	22.7 (72.9)	22.7 (72.9)	24.0 (75.2)	25.4 (77.7)	25.7 (78.3)	25.4 (77.7)	25.0 (77.0)
Average precipitation mm (inches)	146.5 (5.77)	152.3 (6.00)	181.7 (7.15)	179.9 (7.08)	99.3 (3.91)	6.0 (0.24)	3.5 (0.14)	6.0 (0.24)	16.0 (0.63)	103.7 (4.08)	221.8 (8.73)	189.2 (7.45)	1,305.9 (51.42)
Source: NOAA

== Notable people ==
- Denis Sassou Nguesso, politician, attended Dolisie Normal College

== See also ==
- Railway stations in Congo
- Transport in the Republic of the Congo
