= Loango District =

Coordinates: 4°39′S 11°48′E

Loango
- District
- Interactive map of Loango
- Region: Kouilou Region

Area
  - Total: 387 sq mi (1,002 km^{2})

Population (2023 census)
  - Total: 39,531
  - Density: 102.2/sq mi (39.45/km^{2})
- Time zone: UTC+1 (GMT +1)

Loango is a district in the Kouilou Region of far south-western Republic of the Congo. The capital lies at Loango.
