= Loukela District =

Coordinates: 0°24′S 17°03′E

Loukela
- District
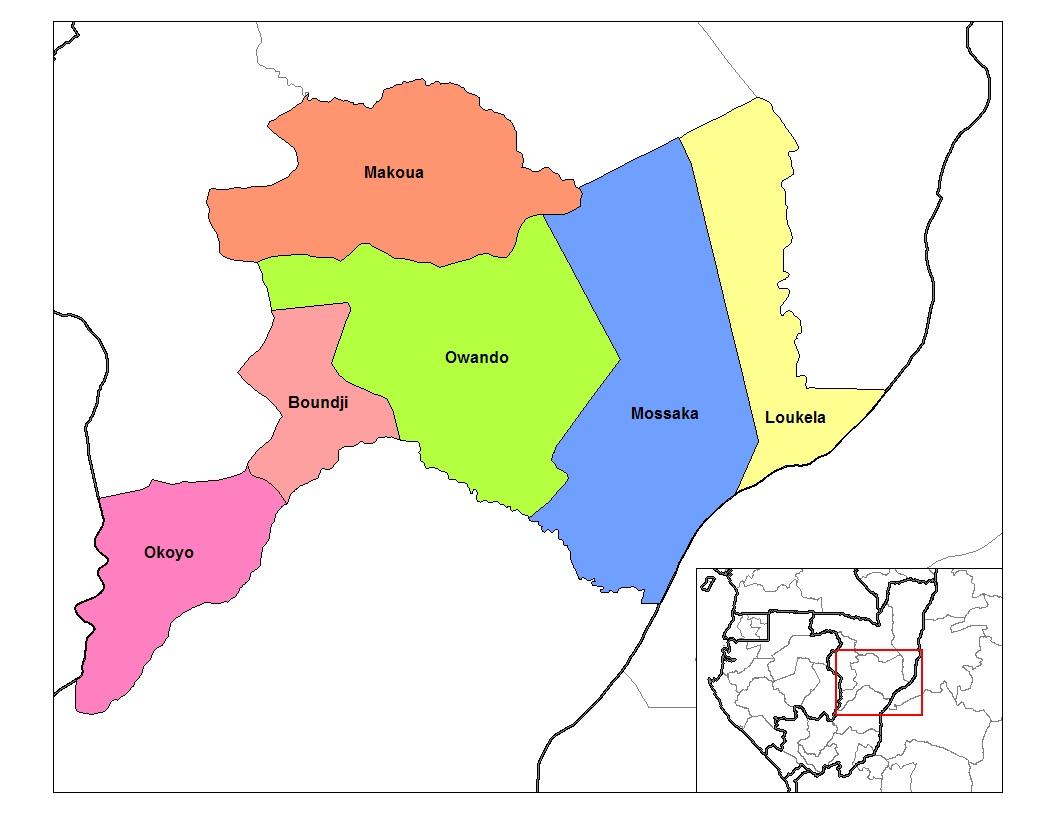
- Loukela District in the region
- Country: Republic of the Congo
- Region: Cuvette Region

Area
  - Total: 3,302 sq mi (8,552 km^{2})

Population (2023 census)
  - Total: 42,676
  - Density: 12.92/sq mi (4.990/km^{2})
- Time zone: UTC+1 (GMT +1)

Loukela is a district in the Cuvette Region of the Republic of the Congo. The capital lies at Loukela.
