= Communes of the Republic of the Congo =

The Republic of the Congo includes 16 communes, some divided in urban boroughs (arrondissements) and in quarters.

Two of these communes, Brazzaville and Pointe-Noire, have the same name as their respective departments, but the departments also cover other administrative units.

In October 2024, the commune of Kintélé was transferred from the department of Pool to the department of Brazzaville.

The list of the communes sorted by departments (with the number of arrondissements):

- Bouenza: Madingou (0) and Nkayi (2)
- Brazzaville: Brazzaville (9) and Kintélé (0)
- Cuvette : Owando (0) and Oyo (0)
- Cuvette-Ouest: Ewo (0)
- Lékoumou: Sibiti (0)
- Likouala: Impfondo (0)
- Niari : Dolisie (2) and Mossendjo (2)
- Plateaux: Djambala (0)
- Pointe-Noire: Pointe-Noire (6)
- Pool: Kinkala (0)
- Sangha: Ouésso (2) and Pokola (0)

== See also ==
- Districts of the Republic of the Congo
- Departments of the Republic of the Congo
- ISO 3166-2:CG
