= Kimongo District =

Coordinates: 4°32′S 13°12′E

Kimongo
- District
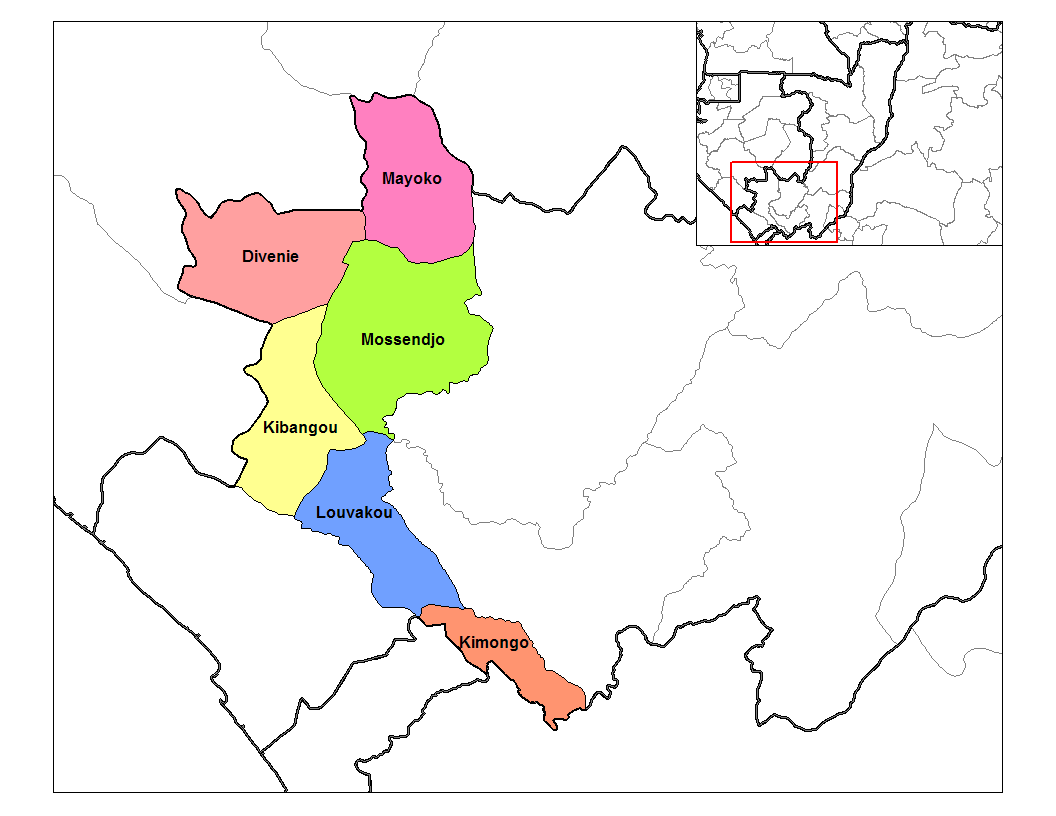
- Kimongo District in the region
- Country: Republic of the Congo
- Region: Niari Region

Area
  - Total: 530 sq mi (1,360 km^{2})

Population (2023 census)
  - Total: 18,929
  - Density: 36.0/sq mi (13.9/km^{2})
- Time zone: UTC+1 (GMT +1)

Kimongo is a district in the Niari Region of south-western Republic of the Congo. The capital lies at Kimongo. The district shares a western border with the Angolan Exclave of Cabinda.

== Demographics ==
A 2007 census estimated the population to be 19,578.
