= Boko-Songho District =

Coordinates: 4°26′35″S 13°36′50″E

Boko-Songho
- District
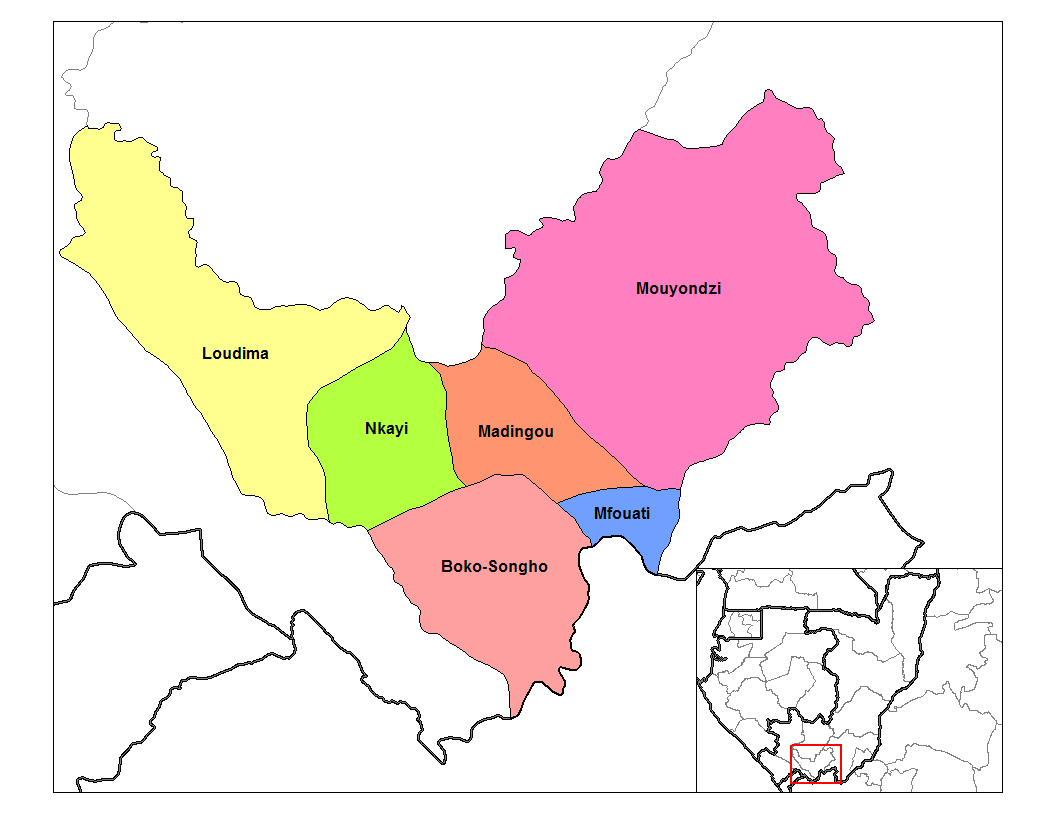
- Boko-Songho District in the region
- Country: Republic of the Congo
- Department: Bouenza Department

Area
  - Total: 530 sq mi (1,373 km^{2})

Population (2023 census)
  - Total: 11,563
  - Density: 21.81/sq mi (8.422/km^{2})
- Time zone: UTC+1 (GMT +1)

Boko-Songho is a district in the Bouenza Region of southern Republic of the Congo. The capital lies at Boko-Songho.

== Towns and villages ==
The villages of Boko-Songho district are: Minga, Hidi, Mankala, Nzangui, Kinzambi (Tipheret), Kabadissou, Manzakala, Nsoukou Bouadi, Loudima, Kisenga, Bouaboua, Louhete, Manzaou, Kiteka, Kingoma, Ntoto-Hola 1&2, La Louamba...from the south and Badondo's villages from the north.

== See also ==
- Boko District
