= Mvouti District =

Coordinates: 4°20′S 12°25′E

Mvouti Mvuti, Vuti
- District
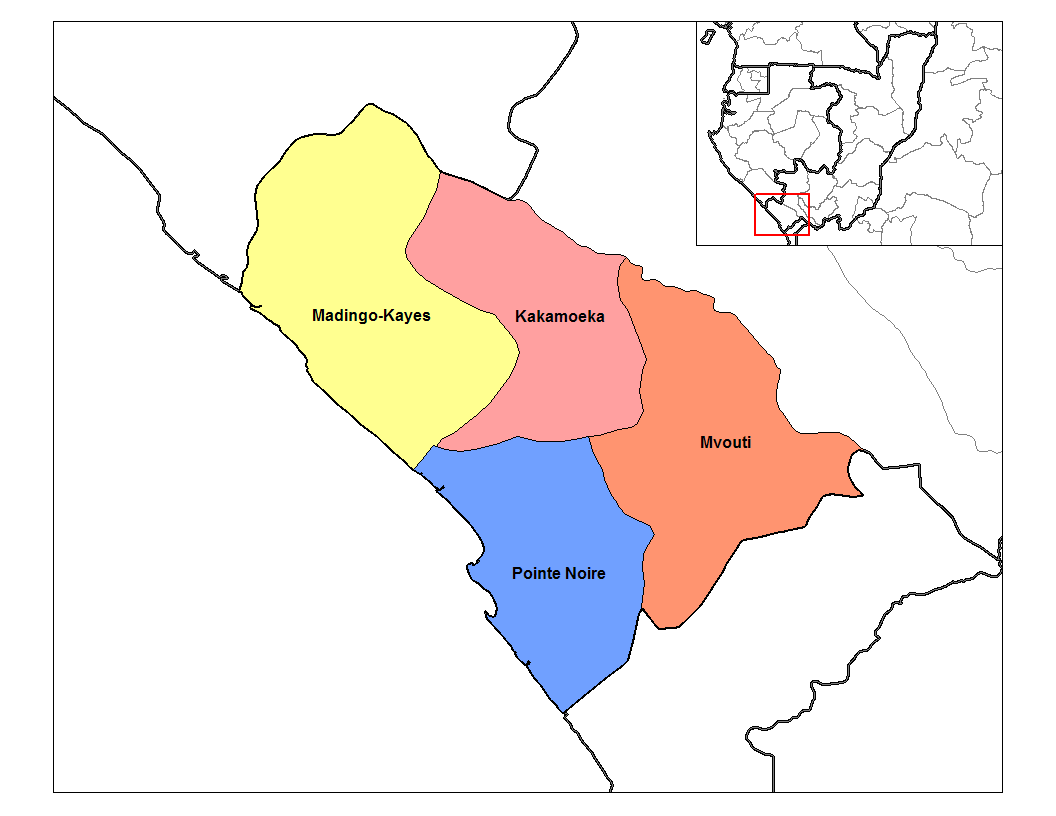
- Mvouti District in the department
- Country: Republic of the Congo
- Department: Kouilou Department

Area
  - Total: 1,300 sq mi (3,368 km^{2})

Population (2023 census)
  - Total: 19,132
  - Density: 14.71/sq mi (5.681/km^{2})
- Time zone: UTC+1 (GMT +1)

Mvouti (Kongo: Mvuti, Vuti) is a district in the Kouilou Department of far south-western Republic of the Congo. The capital lies at Mvouti.
