= Kakamoeka District =

Coordinates: 4°01′S 12°01′E

Kakamoeka
- District
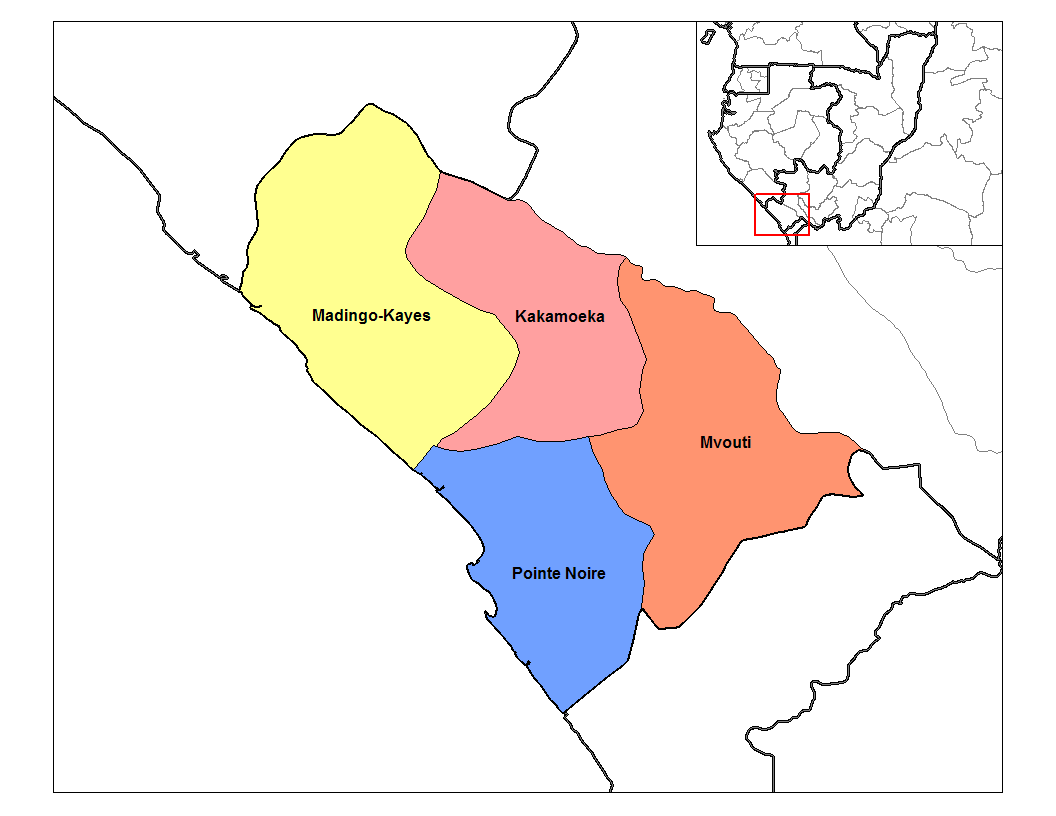
- Kakamoeka District in the department
- Country: Republic of the Congo
- Department: Kouilou Department

Area
  - Total: 820 sq mi (2,124 km^{2})

Population (2023 census)
  - Total: 8,729
  - Density: 10.64/sq mi (4.110/km^{2})
- Time zone: UTC+1 (GMT +1)

Kakamoeka (can also be written as Nkakamueka, Nkakamweka, Nkaakamueeka or Nkaakamweeka) is a district in the Kouilou Department of far south-western Republic of the Congo. The capital lies at Kakamoeka.
