= Mabombo District =

Mabombo
- District
- Interactive map of Mabombo
- Country: Republic of the Congo
- Region: Bouenza Department

Area
  - Total: 377.3 sq mi (977.1 km^{2})

Population (2023 census)
  - Total: 12,145
  - Density: 32.19/sq mi (12.43/km^{2})
- Time zone: UTC+1 (GMT +1)

Mabombo is a district in the Bouenza Department of Republic of the Congo.
