= Nzambi District =

Nzambi
- District
- Interactive map of Nzambi
- Country: Republic of the Congo
- Department: Kouilou Department

Area
  - Total: 2,580 km^{2} (1,000 sq mi)

Population (2023 census)
  - Total: 2,132
  - Density: 0.826/km^{2} (2.14/sq mi)
- Time zone: UTC+1 (GMT +1)

Nzambi is a district in the Kouilou Department of Republic of the Congo.
