= Oyo, Republic of the Congo =

Oyo
- Location in the Republic of the Congo
- Coordinates: 1°9′37″S 15°58′25″E
- Country: Republic of the Congo
- Department: Cuvette Department
- District: Oyo District
- Commune: Oyo

Population (2023 census)
  - Total: 63,598

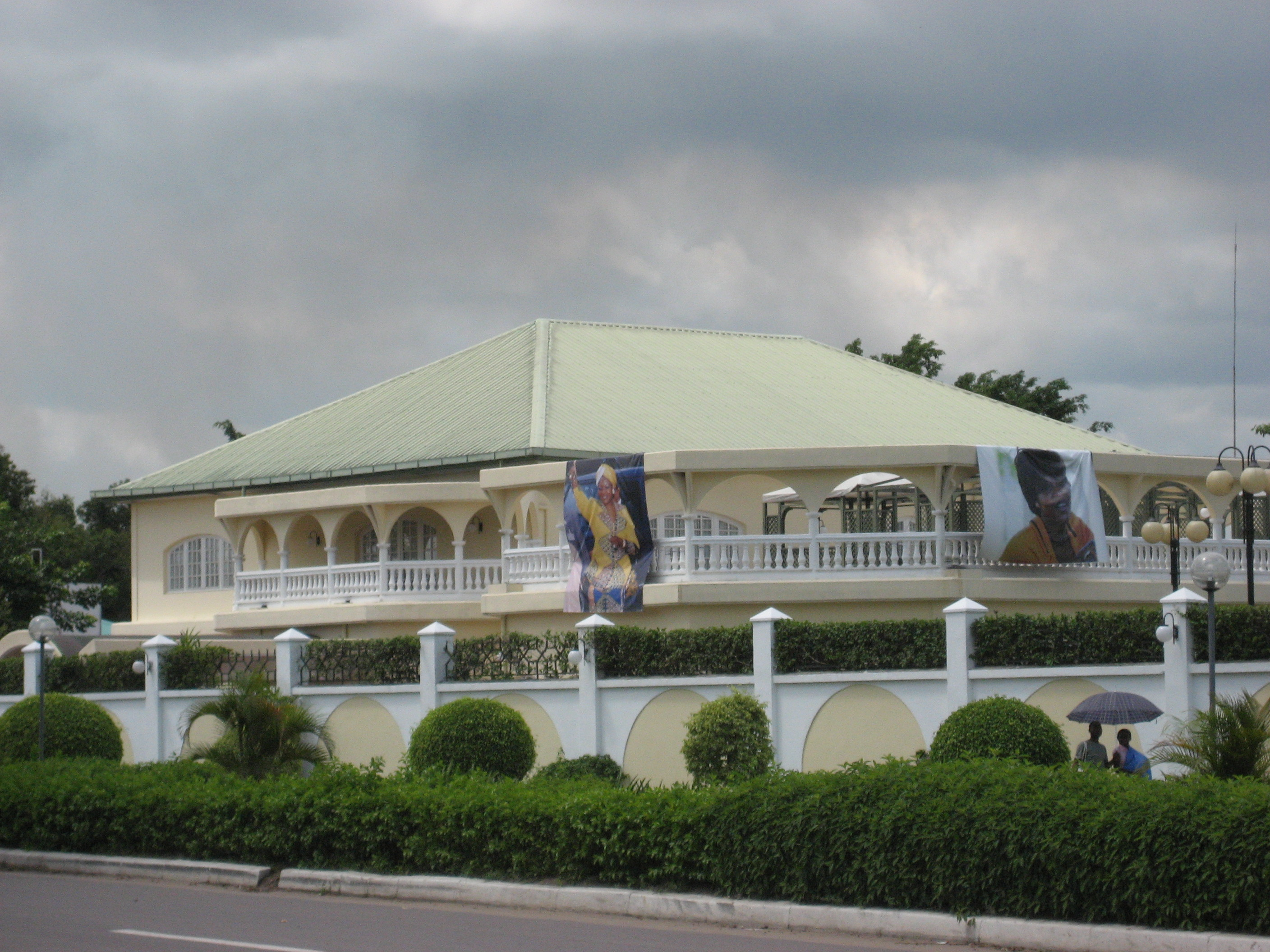
One of the President's family villas in Oyo

Oyo is a town and a commune in the central Republic of Congo in the Cuvette Department. It is the seat of the Oyo District.

It is located more than 400 km from the national capital Brazzaville and 100 km from Owando further north. It is connected by paved road to Brazzaville and to Owando. It is served by the Oyo Ollombo Airport and a river port on the Alima River.

Denis Sassou Nguesso, the current president of the Republic of Congo, as well as several members of his family and his entourage, have houses in or around Oyo.

In addition, the city of Oyo is distinguished by the presence of a 5-star luxury hotel the Pefaco Hotel Alima Palace 5* which is located on the edge of the banks of the Alima River between the city and the airport.
