= Loango, Republic of Congo =

Loango
- Location in the Republic of the Congo
- Coordinates: 4°39′22″S 11°48′41″E
- Country: Republic of the Congo
- Department: Kouilou
- District: Loango
- Founded: c. 16th century
- Founder: Bakongo (Bavili), Kingdom of Loango
- Time zone: UTC+01:00

Loango (can also be written as Luango, Lwango, Luangu, Lwangu, Luaangu or Lwaangu) is a town of the Republic of the Congo. Located on the coast of the Atlantic Ocean, Loango had a population of 21,016 in 2023, the date of the country's last official census.

Since 2011 it has been the capital of the Kouilou Department and of the new Loango District.

== Location ==
Loango lies on the south coast of the Loango Bay, to the southwest of Diosso, a few kilometers north of the city of Pointe-Noire.

== History ==
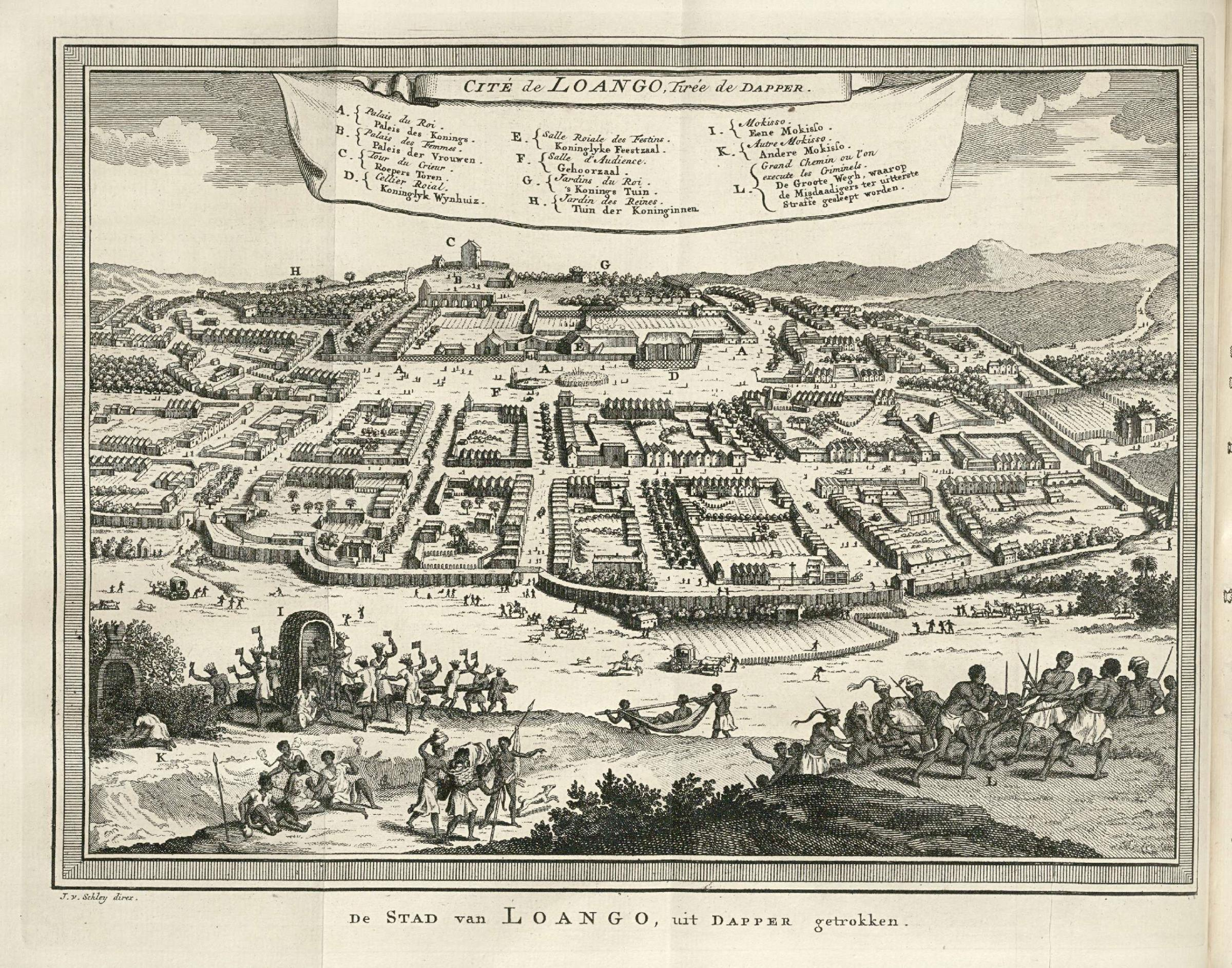
City of Loango in 1747

Diosso was the former capital of the Kingdom of Loango and home to its rulers' mausoleum. Roman Catholic missionaries were active in Diosso, which had a royal palace. The port of Loango was formerly a major slavery port, but the site has now been abandoned and few traces remain.

The first radiotelegraph link in the tropics, between Brazzaville and Loango, was created around 1910 using techniques developed by Joseph Bethenod, chief engineer of the Société française radio-électrique (SFR).

== See also ==
- Loango slavery harbour

== Sources ==
- Clark, John Frank; Decalo, Samuel (2012), Historical Dictionary of Republic of the Congo, Scarecrow Press, ISBN 978-0-8108-4919-8
- "Congo: Loango slavery port abandoned", The Morning Call – via AfricaNews
- Delacroix, Laurent; Piernas, Gersende (2016), Société française radio-électrique (SFR - Thomson) (PDF) (in French), Roubaix: Archives nationales du monde du travail
- Jones, Adam (1983), German Sources for West African History, 1599-1669, Steiner, ISBN 978-3-515-03728-0
- "Loango Map — Satellite Images of Loango", maplandia
- Martin, Phyllis (2009), Catholic Women of Congo-Brazzaville: Mothers and Sisters in Troubled Times, Indiana University Press, ISBN 978-0-253-22055-4
