= Yamba District (Republic of the Congo) =

Yamba
- District
- Interactive map of Yamba
- Country: Republic of the Congo
- Region: Bouenza Department

Area
  - Total: 315.9 sq mi (818.2 km^{2})

Population (2023 census)
  - Total: 11,377
  - Density: 36.01/sq mi (13.90/km^{2})
- Time zone: UTC+1 (GMT +1)

Yamba is a district in the Bouenza Department of Republic of the Congo.
