= Mossendjo Airport =

- IATA: MSX; ICAO: FCMM

Summary
- Serves: Mossendjo, Republic of the Congo
- Elevation AMSL: 1,519 ft / 463 m
- Coordinates: 2°56′47″S 12°41′55″E

Map
- Location in the Republic of the Congo

Runways
Direction	Length		Surface
Direction	m	ft	Surface
09/27	920	3,018	Grass
- Source: GCM Google Maps

Mossendjo Airport (IATA: MSX, ICAO: FCMM) is an airport serving the town of Mossendjo in the Niari Department, Republic of the Congo. The runway is on the west end of the town.

== See also ==
- List of airports in the Republic of the Congo
- Transport in the Republic of the Congo
