= Boko District =

Coordinates: 4°38′S 14°39′E

Boko
- District
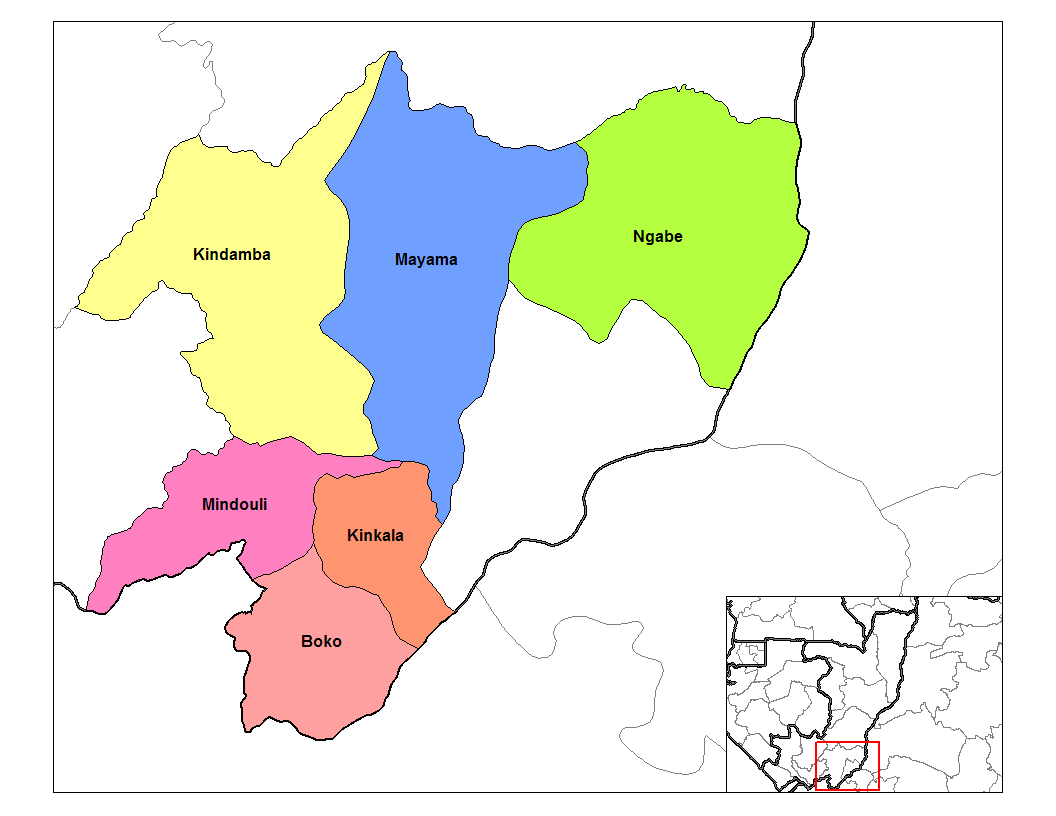
- Boko District in the department
- Country: Republic of the Congo
- Department: Pool Department

Area
  - Total: 443 sq mi (1,148 km^{2})

Population (2023 census)
  - Total: 15,330
  - Density: 34.59/sq mi (13.35/km^{2})
- Time zone: UTC+1 (GMT +1)

Boko is a district in the Pool Department of south-eastern Republic of the Congo. It has the same name as its capital, the town of Boko, Republic of the Congo.

== See also ==
- Boko-Songho District
- Boko (Burkina Faso)
