= Hinda District =

Hinda
- District
- Interactive map of Hinda
- Country: Republic of the Congo
- Region: Kouilou Department

Area
  - Total: 294.7 sq mi (763.2 km^{2})

Population (2023 census)
  - Total: 19,264
  - Density: 65.37/sq mi (25.24/km^{2})
- Time zone: UTC+1 (GMT +1)

Hinda is a district in the Kouilou Department of Republic of the Congo.
