= Madingou District =

Coordinates: 4°09′13″S 13°33′00″E

Madingou
- District
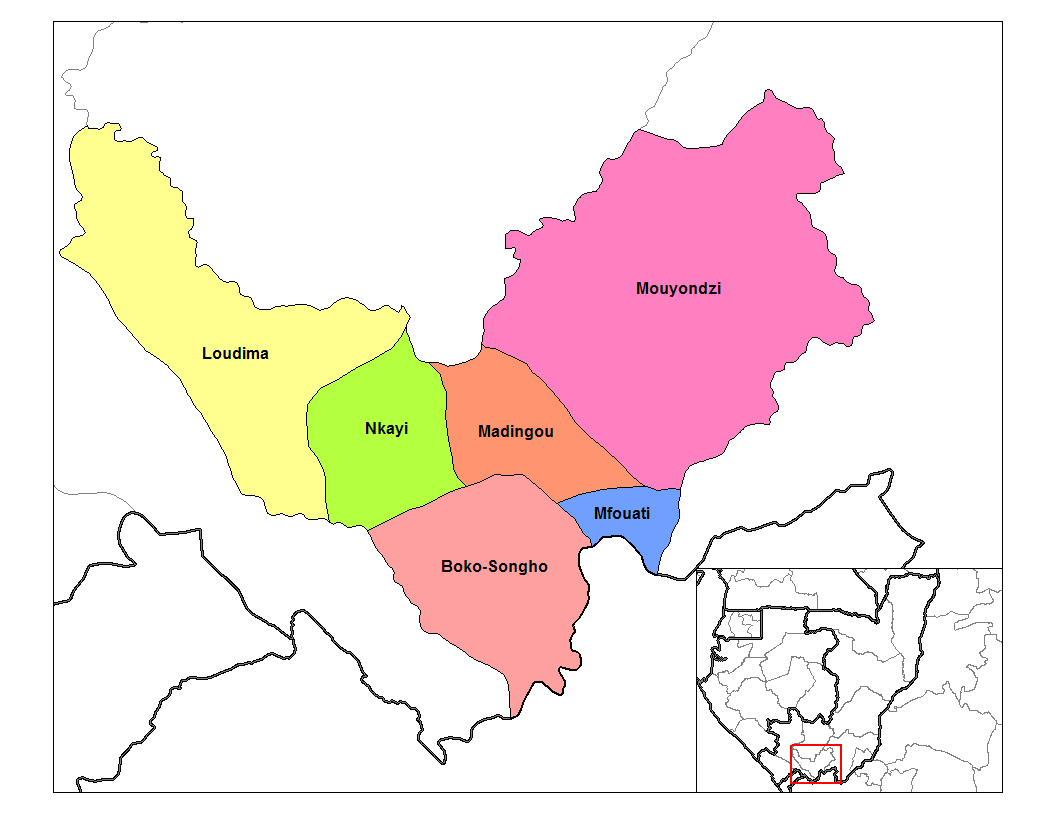
- Madingou District in the region
- Country: Republic of the Congo
- Department: Bouenza Department

Area
  - Total: 370.9 sq mi (960.5 km^{2})

Population (2023 census)
  - Total: 81,254
  - Density: 219.1/sq mi (84.60/km^{2})
- Time zone: UTC+1 (GMT +1)

Madingou (can also be written as Madingu) is a district in the Bouenza Region of southern Republic of the Congo. The capital lies at Madingou.
