= Loudima District =

Coordinates: 4°06′09″S 13°02′58″E

Loudima
- District
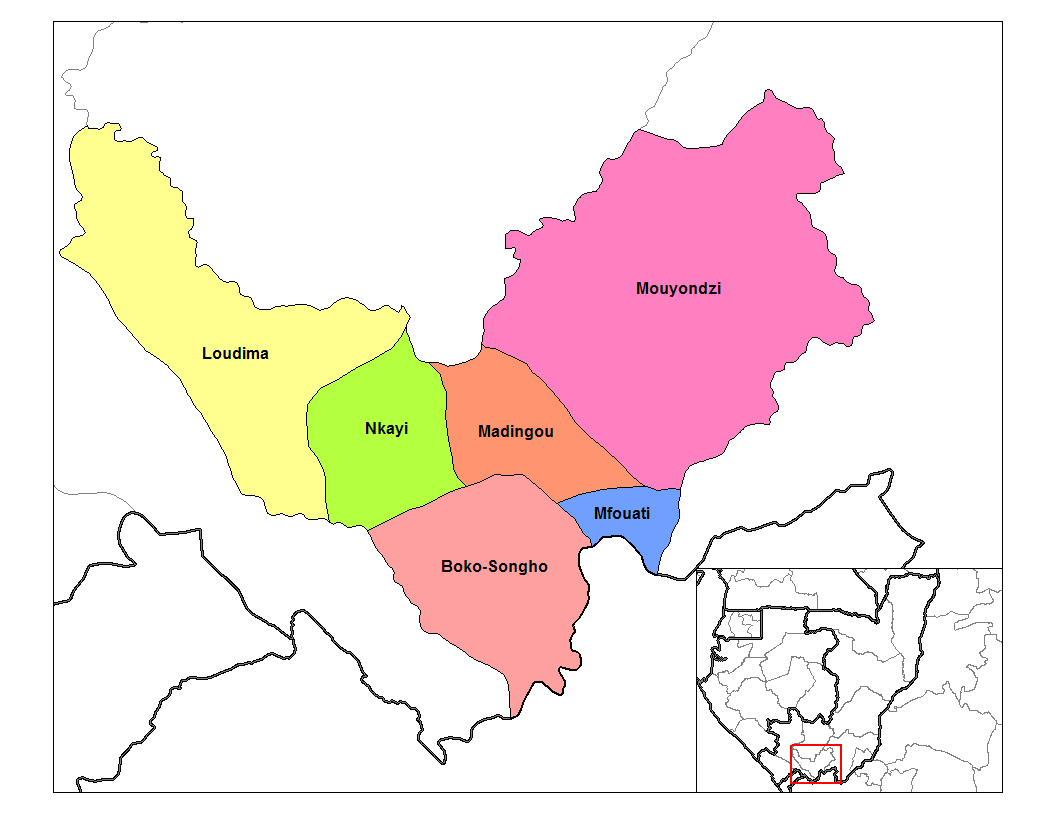
- Loudima District in the region
- Country: Republic of the Congo
- Region: Bouenza Region

Area
  - Total: 1,164 sq mi (3,015 km^{2})

Population (2023 census)
  - Total: 36,644
  - Density: 31.48/sq mi (12.15/km^{2})
- Time zone: UTC+1 (GMT +1)

Loudima (can also be written as Ludima) is a district in the Bouenza Region of southern Republic of the Congo. The capital lies at Loudima.
