= Owando =

- Location in the Republic of the Congo
- Coordinates: 0°29′0″S 15°53′51″E
- Country: Republic of the Congo
- Department: Cuvette
- District: Owando District
- Commune: Owando
- Founded: 1903

Area
  - Total: 378.2 km^{2} (146.0 sq mi)
- Elevation: 325 m (1,066 ft)

Population (2023 census)
  - Total: 48,642
  - Density: 128.6/km^{2} (333.1/sq mi)

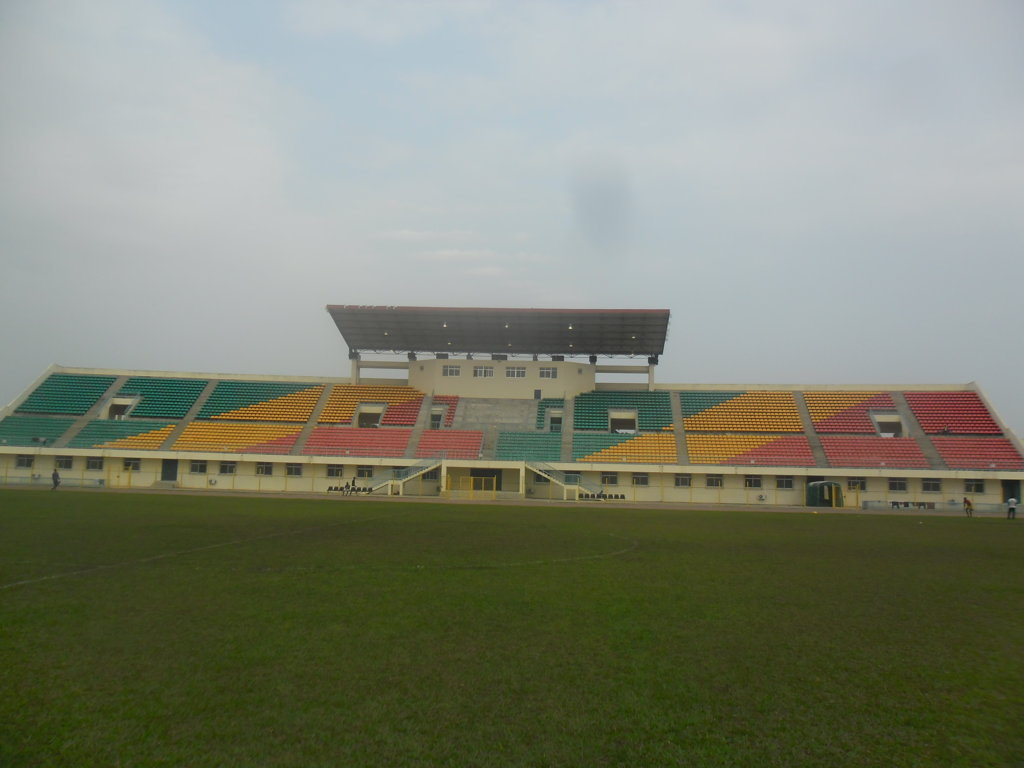
Owando Football Stadium.

Owando is a town and a commune located in the central Republic of the Congo lying on the Kouyou River. It is the capital of Cuvette Department and of Owando District. It is home to a market and has an airport.

It was formerly known as Fort-Rousset.

== History ==
Founded as Rousset in 1903 and quickly renamed Fort-Rousset in 1904, it was renamed as Owando in 1977.

A Roman Catholic diocese was established on 14 September 1955.
