= Mvouti =

Coordinates: 04°14′47″S 12°29′20″E

Mvouti (can also be written as Mvuti) is a town in the Kouilou Region of southern Republic of Congo.

== Transport ==
It is served by a station on the national railway network.

== See also ==
- Railway stations in Congo
