= Oyo District =

Oyo
- District
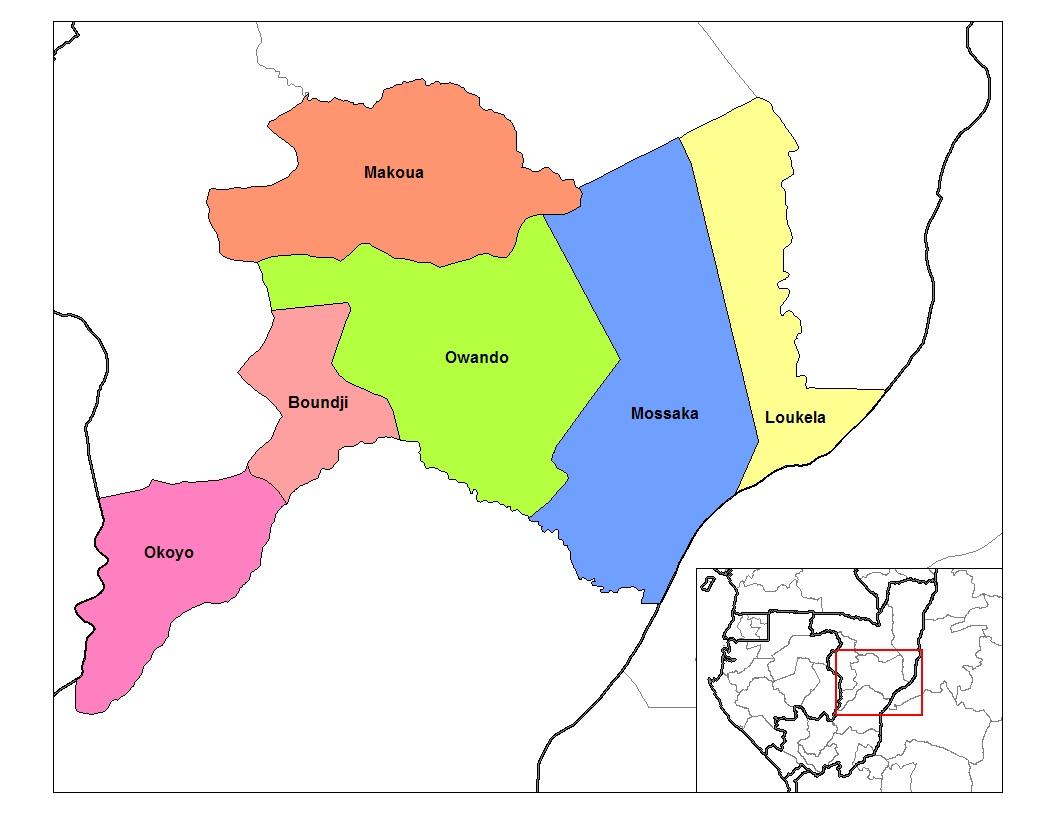
- Oyo District in the department
- Country: Republic of the Congo
- Department: Cuvette

Area
  - Total: 608 sq mi (1,574 km^{2})

Population (2023 census)
  - Total: 70,287
  - Density: 115.7/sq mi (44.66/km^{2})
- Time zone: UTC+1 (GMT +1)

Oyo is a district in the Cuvette Department of the Republic of the Congo. The capital lies at Oyo.
