= Louvakou District =

Coordinates: 4.114°S 12.684°E

Louvakou
- District
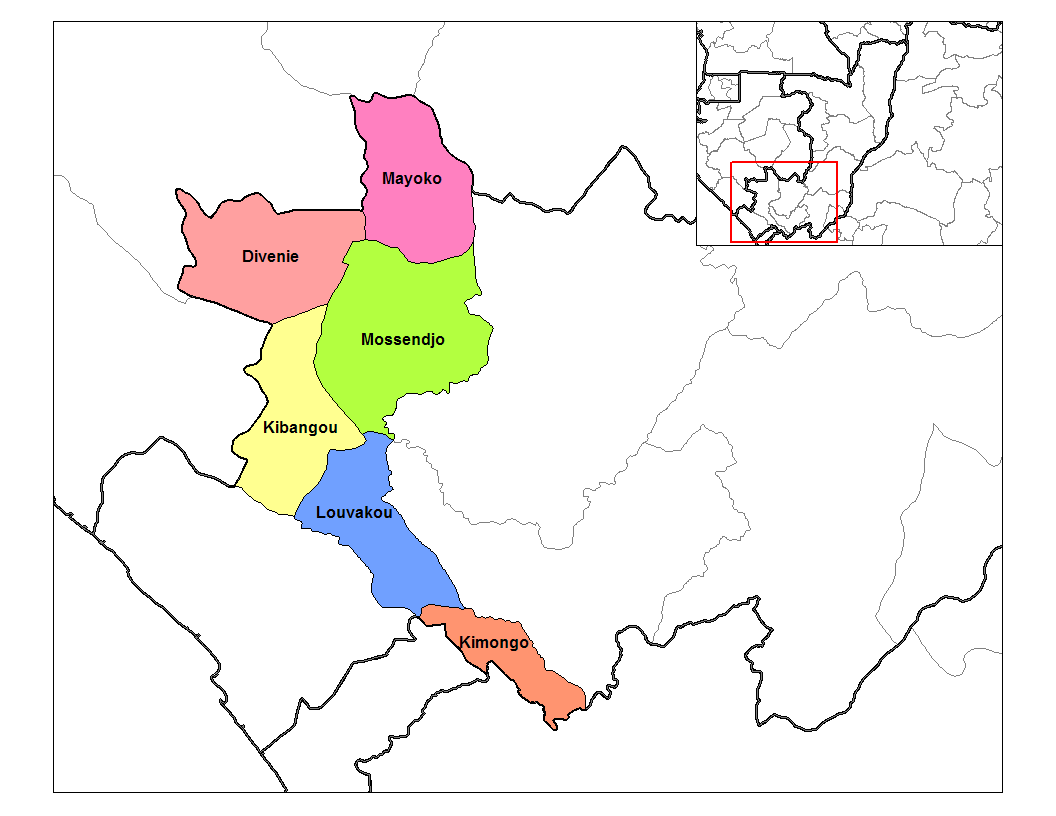
- Louvakou District in the region
- Country: Republic of the Congo
- Region: Niari Region

Area
  - Total: 1,069 sq mi (2,769 km^{2})

Population (2023 census)
  - Total: 209,889
  - Density: 196.3/sq mi (75.80/km^{2})
- Time zone: UTC+1 (GMT +1)

Louvakou (can also be written as Luvaku) is a district in the Niari Department of south-western Republic of the Congo. The capital lies at Louvakou.
