= Nkayi, Republic of the Congo =

Nkayi
- Location in the Republic of the Congo
- Coordinates: 4°11′3″S 13°17′18″E
- Country: Republic of the Congo
- Department: Bouenza Department
- District: Kayes District
- Commune: Nkayi

Area
  - Total: 7.6 km^{2} (2.9 sq mi)
- Elevation: 181 m (594 ft)

Population (2023 census)
  - Total: 104,083
  - Density: 14,000/km^{2} (35,000/sq mi)
- Area code: 242

Nkayi, also known as N'kayi, is a town and a commune in the Bouenza Department of the Republic of the Congo. It is the country's fourth largest city with a population of 104,083 (2023 census).

It is divided into 2 urban boroughs (arrondissements):

1. Mouana-Nto (Mouana Ntô)
2. Soulouka

Nkayi is a major sugar production centre in the country.

== Transport ==
The city is served by a station on the national railway network, the Congo-Ocean Railway. It is home to Yokangassi Airport, also known as Nkayi Airport.

== History ==
Situated in the fertile Niari Valley, the town was named Jacob in 1887. That was the name of the French engineer who led the first mission to select the best route for the Congo-Ocean Railway. Then the city began growing thanks to the thriving sugar cane plantations led by important agroindustries. In 1975, Jacob had a population of 25,000, and its name was changed to the native one of Nkayi.

The city is the fourth largest town in the Republic of the Congo since 1980.

== See also ==
- Railway stations in Congo
- Diocese of Nkayi
