= Transport in the Republic of the Congo =

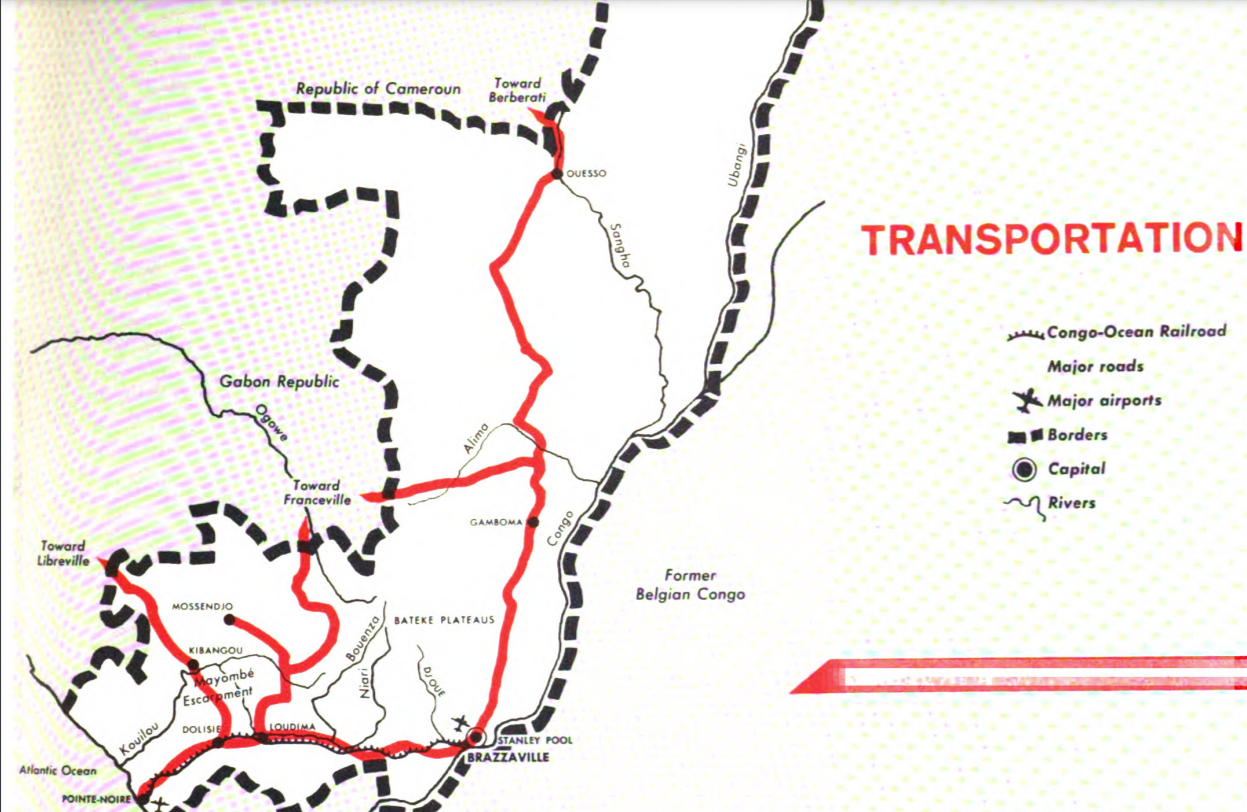
Transport in the Congo in 1961

Transport in the Republic of Congo includes land, air and water modes. Over 3,000 km (1,900 mi) of paved roads are in use. The two international airports are Maya-Maya Airport and Pointe Noire Airport.

The country also has a large port on the Atlantic Ocean at Pointe-Noire, others along the Congo River at Brazzaville and Impfondo.

== Railways ==
Railway network of Republic of Congo

The 510 km Congo-Ocean Railway connects Brazzaville and Pointe-Noire. The road uses a 1.067-m gauge.

=== Timeline ===
In 2003, concessioning occurred.

In 2006, rail service was suspended by floods and oil shortages.

On 12 April 2007, a South Korean consortium agreed to build a new 800 km railway in the Congo-Brazzaville Republic in return for timber concessions. The railway would connect Brazzaville to Ouesso in the northwest Sangha region. A two-year feasibility study would take place before a final agreement with the government and starting construction work on the railway.

== Highways ==
Highways span 23,324 km. 3,111 km are paved.

17,000 km of the Congo's railways are classified as national, departmental, and routes of local interest. 6,324 km are non-classified routes.

The National Highway Network includes:

- N1 Brazzaville - Kinkala - Dolisie - Pointe Noire
- N2 Brazzaville - Owando - Ouésso
- N3 Dolisie - Border with Gabon

== Waterways ==
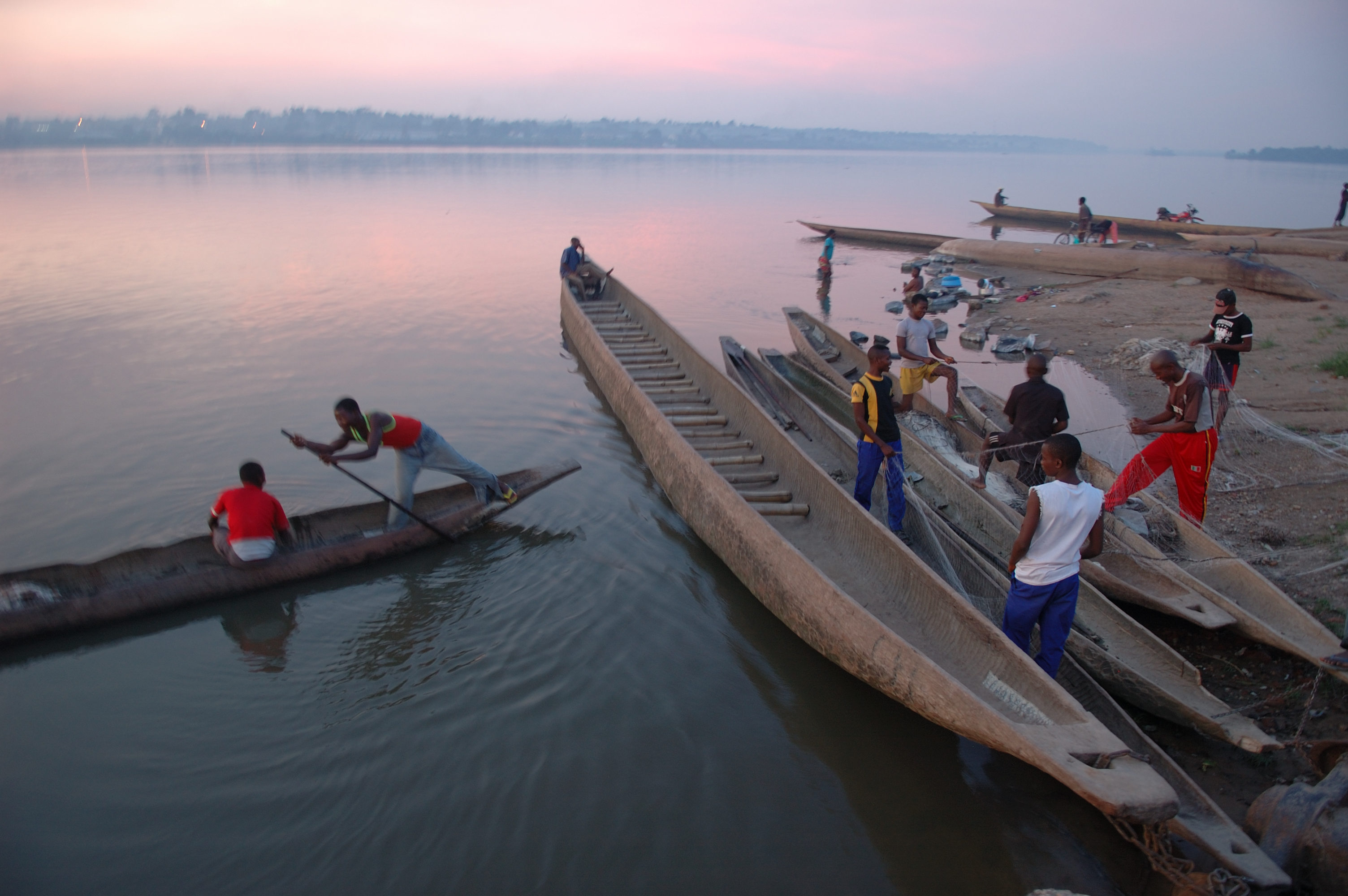
Pirogues on the Congo river

The Congo and Ubangi (Oubangui) rivers provide 1,120 km of commercially navigable water transport. Other rivers are used for local traffic.

== Pipelines ==
The country has oil (982 km), gas (232 km) and liquid petroleum gas (4km) pipeline networks.

== Ports and harbours ==
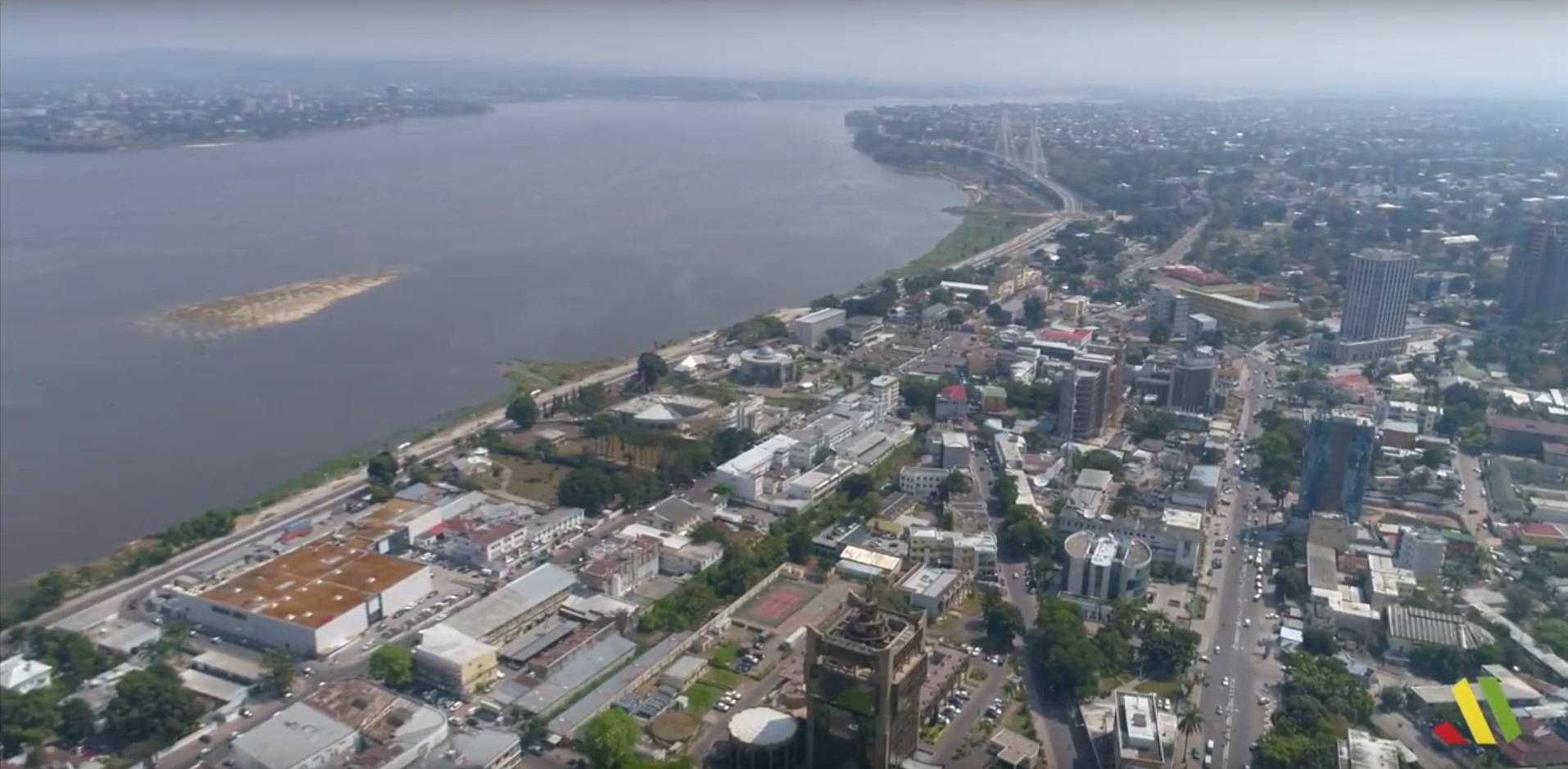
An aerial view of Brazzaville

The Republic of Congo's port of Pointe-Noire function under the oversight of the Port Autonome de Pointe-Noire,. It is a member port of the International Association of Ports and Harbours (IAPH).

=== Atlantic Ocean ===
- Pointe-Noire (Major seaport)

=== Congo River ===
- Brazzaville (River port)
- Impfondo
- Djeno (Oil terminal)

=== Other rivers ===
- Oyo

=== Sangha River ===
- Ouesso

=== Regulations ===
In 2008, the Republic of Congo introduced a regulation requiring all shipments destined for the country to be accompanied by an Electronic Cargo Tracking Note (ECTN) certificate. shipments that are only transiting through the Republic of Congo may not require an ECTN in certain cases. The ECTN requirement applies at all ports in the Republic of Congo, including Pointe-Noire.

== Air ==
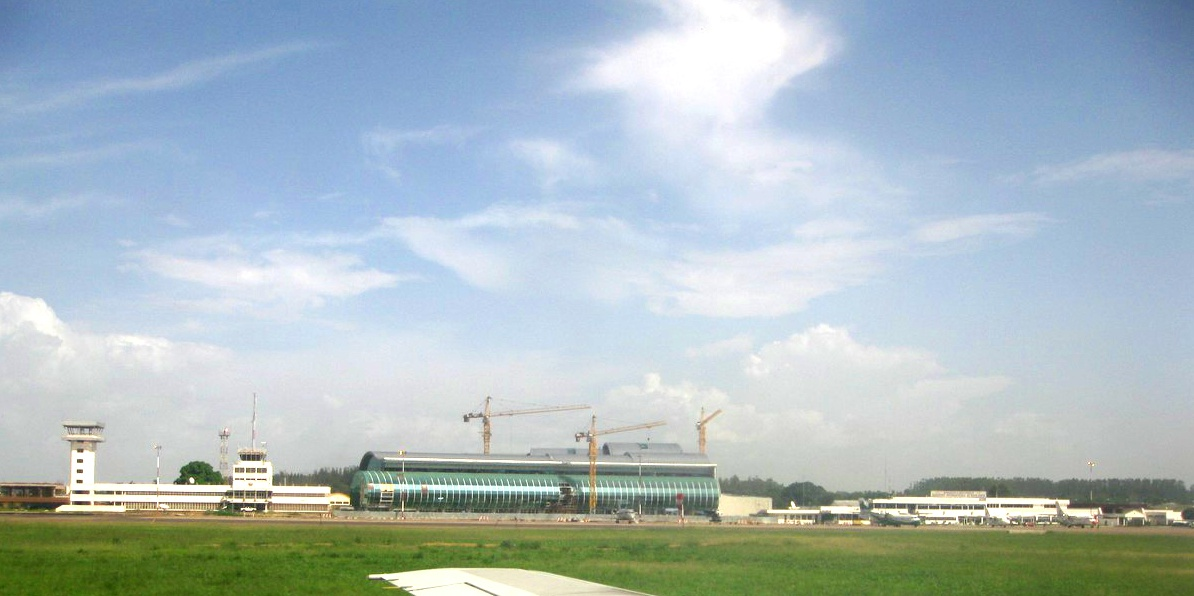
Maya-Maya airport in 2010

The Republic of the Congo has two international airports: Maya-Maya Airport in Brazzaville and Pointe Noire Airport. As of June 2014, six airlines operated between the two airports. Both airports had direct flights to Addis Ababa, Abidjan, Casablanca, Cotonou, Douala, Libreville, Johannesburg, and Paris. Maya-Maya Airport is served by more airlines than Pointe Noire and had direct flights to various other destinations in Africa and the Middle East.

The country hosts 8 airports with paved runways. Five have runways shorter than 2,437 meters. 1 is less than 3,047 meters, while 2 have longer runways.
Ten airports have unpaved runways. Two have runways shorter than 914 meters. Nine have runways shorter than 1,523 meters, while 8 have runways as long as 2,437 meters.

== See also ==
- Republic of the Congo
