= Kouilou Department =

Department of the Republic of the Congo

Coordinates: 04°19′40″S 11°53′37″E

Kouilou Kwilu or Kuilu
- Department
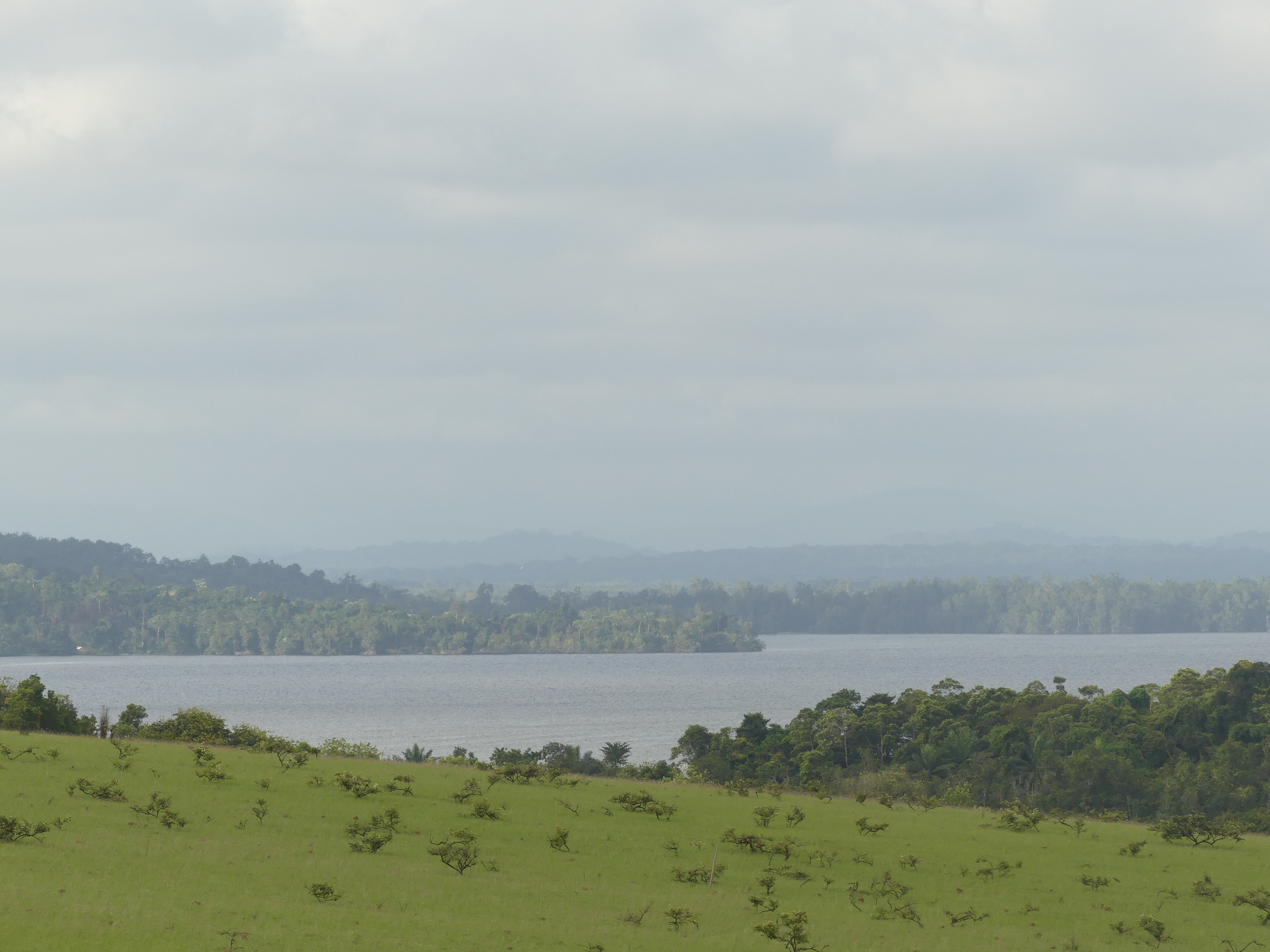

- Kouilou, department of the Republic of the Congo
- Country: Republic of the Congo
- Capital: Loango

Area
  - Total: 13,650 km^{2} (5,270 sq mi)

Population (2023 census)
  - Total: 97,362
  - Density: 7.133/km^{2} (18.47/sq mi)
  - Native Ethnic groups: Bakongo • Bapunu
- HDI (2018): 0.499 low · 11th of 12

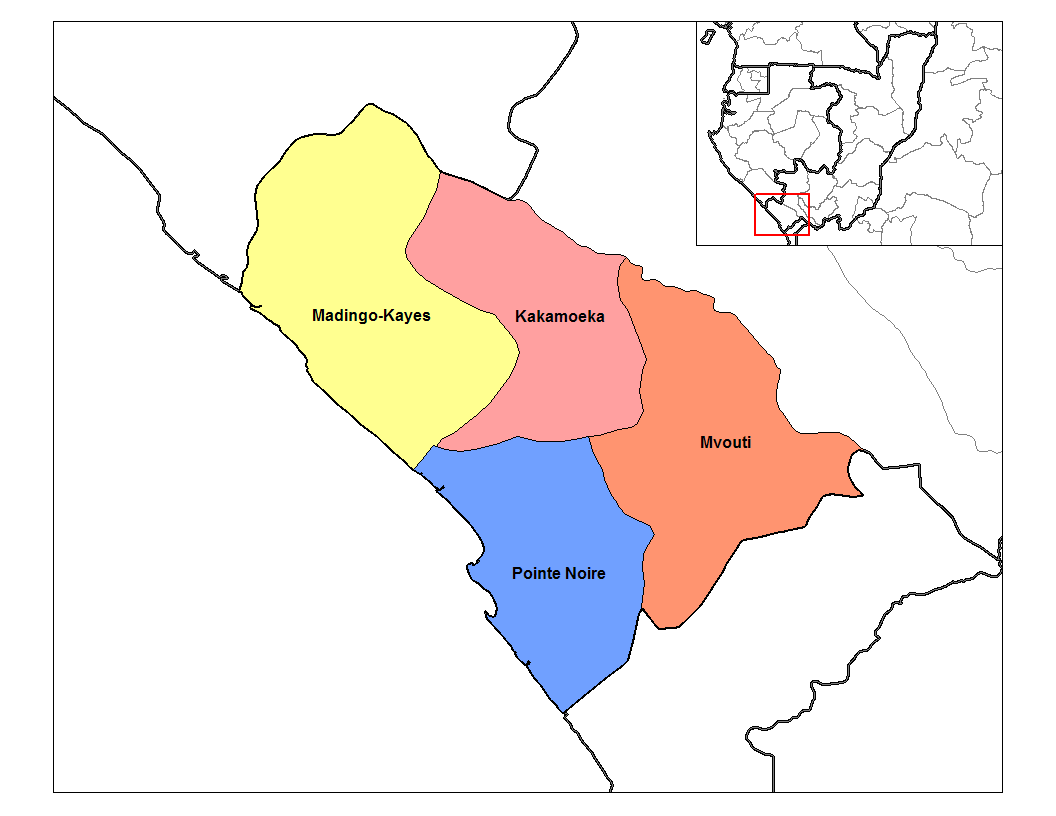
Districts of Kouilou

Kouilou (Kongo: Kwilu, Kuilu) is a department of the Republic of the Congo. Covering the country's coastline, it has an area of 13,650 square kilometres and at the start of 2023 it was home to about 97,362 people. The department borders Niari Department, the commune of Pointe-Noire, and internationally, Gabon and the Cabinda area of Angola.

Since 2011 the town of Loango has been the capital of the Kouilou department. Before, the capital was Hinda (see "Villages and towns" part).

Kouilou is also the name of a river, the Kouilou-Niari River.

== Administrative divisions ==
Kouilou Department is divided into six districts:

=== Districts ===
1. Hinda District
2. Madingo-Kayes District
3. Mvouti District
4. Kakamoeka District
5. Nzambi District
6. Loango District

== Villages and towns ==
- Hinda (old capital of the department until 2011)
- Madingo-Kayes
- Mvouti

== Sources ==
Clark, John Frank; Decalo, Samuel (2012), Historical Dictionary of Republic of the Congo, Scarecrow Press, ISBN 978-0-8108-4919-8
