= Kayes District =

Coordinates: 4°10′S 13°18′E

Nkayi
- District
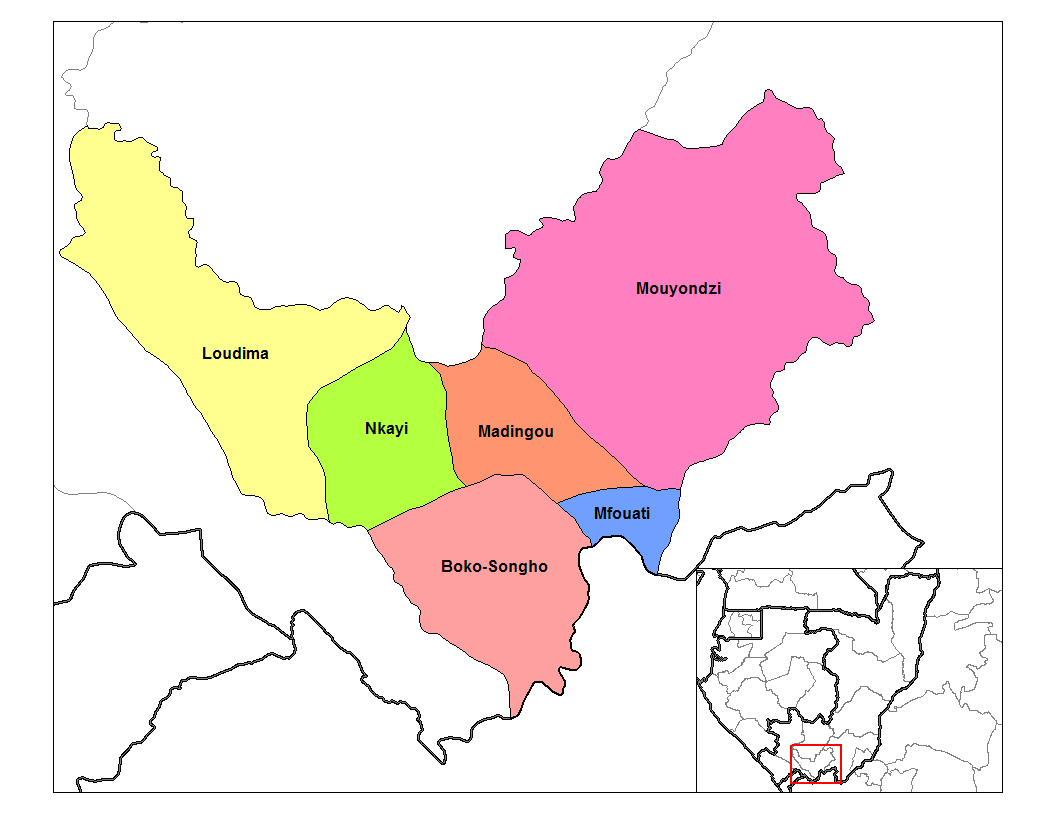
- Nkayi District, Republic of the Congo in the region
- Country: Republic of the Congo
- Region: Bouenza Region

Area
  - Total: 484 sq mi (1,254 km^{2})

Population (2023 census)
  - Total: 114,622
  - Density: 236.7/sq mi (91.41/km^{2})
- Time zone: UTC+1 (GMT +1)

Nkayi is a district in the Bouenza Region of southern Republic of the Congo. The capital lies at Nkayi.
