= Bouenza Department =

Department of the Republic of the Congo

Coordinates: 04°09′13″S 13°33′00″E

Bouenza
- Department
- Bouenza, department of the Republic of the Congo
- Country: Republic of the Congo
- Capital: Madingou

Area
  - Total: 12,265 km^{2} (4,736 sq mi)

Population (2023 census)
  - Total: 363,850
  - Density: 29.666/km^{2} (76.834/sq mi)
- HDI (2018): 0.530 low · 6th of 12

Bouenza (can also be written as Buenza or Bwenza) is a department of the Republic of the Congo in the southern part of the country. It borders the departments of Lékoumou, Niari, and Pool, and internationally, the Democratic Republic of the Congo. The regional capital is Madingou. Towns and cities include Loudima, Mouyondzi, Loutété and Nkayi.

== Administrative divisions ==
Bouenza Department is divided into one commune and ten districts:

=== Districts ===
1. Madingou District
2. Mouyondzi District
3. Boko-Songho District
4. Mfouati District
5. Loudima District
6. Kayes District
7. Kingoué District
8. Mabombo District
9. Tsiaki District
10. Yamba District

=== Communes ===
1. Nkayi Commune
2. Madingou Commune

== Demographics ==
The population was 363,850 as of 2023, and the area is 12,265.4 km².

== Industry and agriculture ==
Bouenza has some industry and cash crops. Among the principal activities are a cement factory in Loutété, sugar cane plantations in Nkayi, and there are reserves of copper, lead and zinc. Hydroelectric power is provided by the Moukoukoulou Dam built in Mindouli. Farming includes bananas, palm oil, groundnuts, tobacco and beans.

== See also ==
- Cement in Africa
