= Districts of the Republic of the Congo =

The Departments of the Republic of the Congo are divided into 86 districts and 6 communes; which are further subdivided into urban communities (communautés urbaines) and rural communities (communautés rurales); which are further subdivided into quarters or neighborhoods (quartiers) and villages. Note the departments of Brazzaville and Pointe-Noire are made of 1 commune each, then divided in urban districts (arrondissements).

The districts are listed below, by department:

== Current divisions ==
=== Northern Congo ===
- Cuvette
1. Owando
2. Makoua
3. Boundji
4. Mossaka
5. Loukoléla
6. Oyo
7. Ngoko
8. Ntokou
9. Tchikapika
10. Bokoma District
- Cuvette-Ouest
1. Ewo
2. Kellé
3. Mbomo
4. Okoyo
5. Etoumbi
6. Mbama
- Likouala

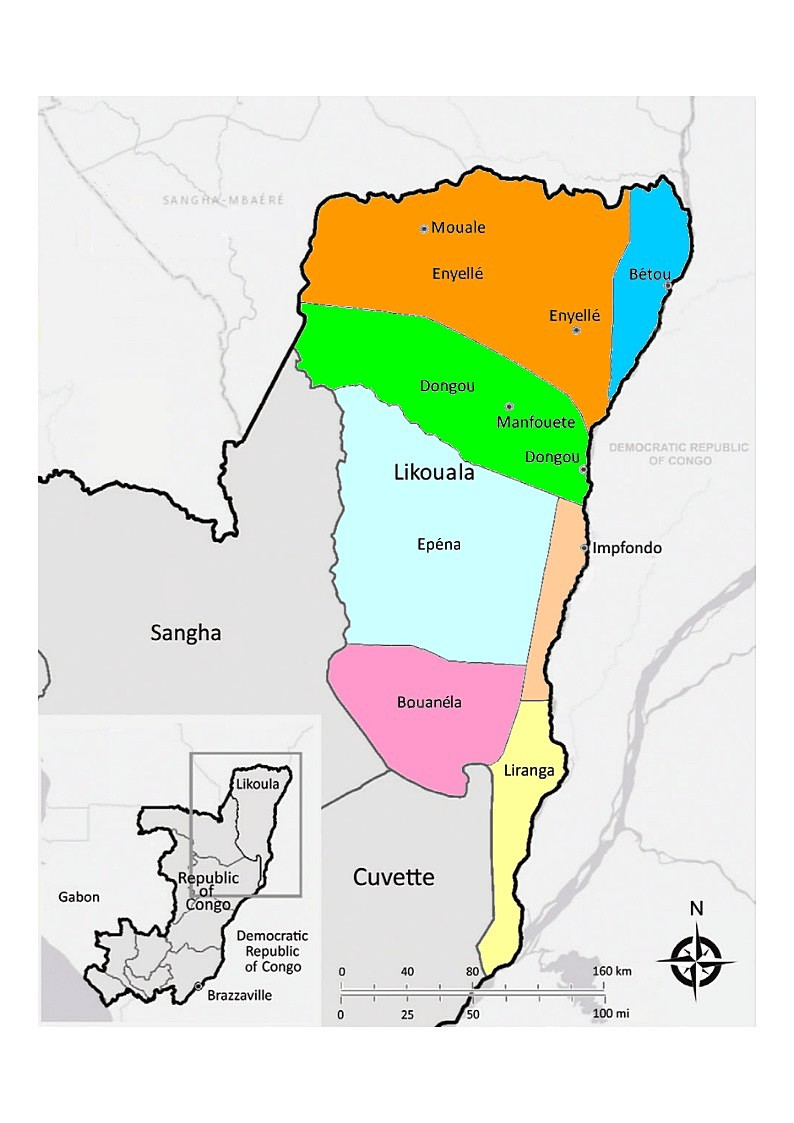
Districts of Likouala

1. Impfondo
2. Epéna
3. Dongou
4. Bétou
5. Bouanéla
6. Enyellé
7. Liranga
- Plateaux
1. Djambala
2. Lékana
3. Gamboma
4. Abala
5. Allembé
6. Makotimpoko
7. Mbon
8. Mpouya
9. Ngo
10. Ollombo
11. Ongogni
- Sangha
1. Mokéko
2. Sembé
3. Souanké
4. Pikounda
5. N'gbala
6. Kabo

=== Southern Congo ===
- Bouenza
1. Madingou
2. Mouyondzi
3. Boko–Songho
4. Mfouati
5. Loudima
6. Kayes
7. Kingoué
8. Mabombo
9. Tsiaki
10. Yamba
- Kouilou
1. Hinda
2. Madingo–Kayes
3. Mvouti
4. Kakamoéka (Kakamoueka in; Kakamoeka in; Kakamoéka in)
5. Nzambi
6. Loango
- Lékoumou
1. Sibiti
2. Komono
3. Zanaga
4. Bambama
5. Mayéyé
- Niari
1. Louvakou
2. Kibangou
3. Divénié
4. Mayoko
5. Kimongo
6. Moutamba
7. Banda
8. Londéla–Kayes
9. Makabana
10. Mbinda
11. Moungoundou-sud
12. Nyanga
13. Moungoundou-nord
14. Yaya
- Pointe-Noire
1. Tchiamba-Nzassi
- Pool
1. Kinkala
2. Boko
3. Mindouli
4. Kindamba
5. Goma Tsé-Tsé
6. Mayama
7. Ngabé
8. Mbanza–Ndounga
9. Louingui
10. Loumo
11. Ignié
12. Vindza
13. Kimba

== Historical divisions ==
=== Northern Congo ===
==== Cuvette Department ====
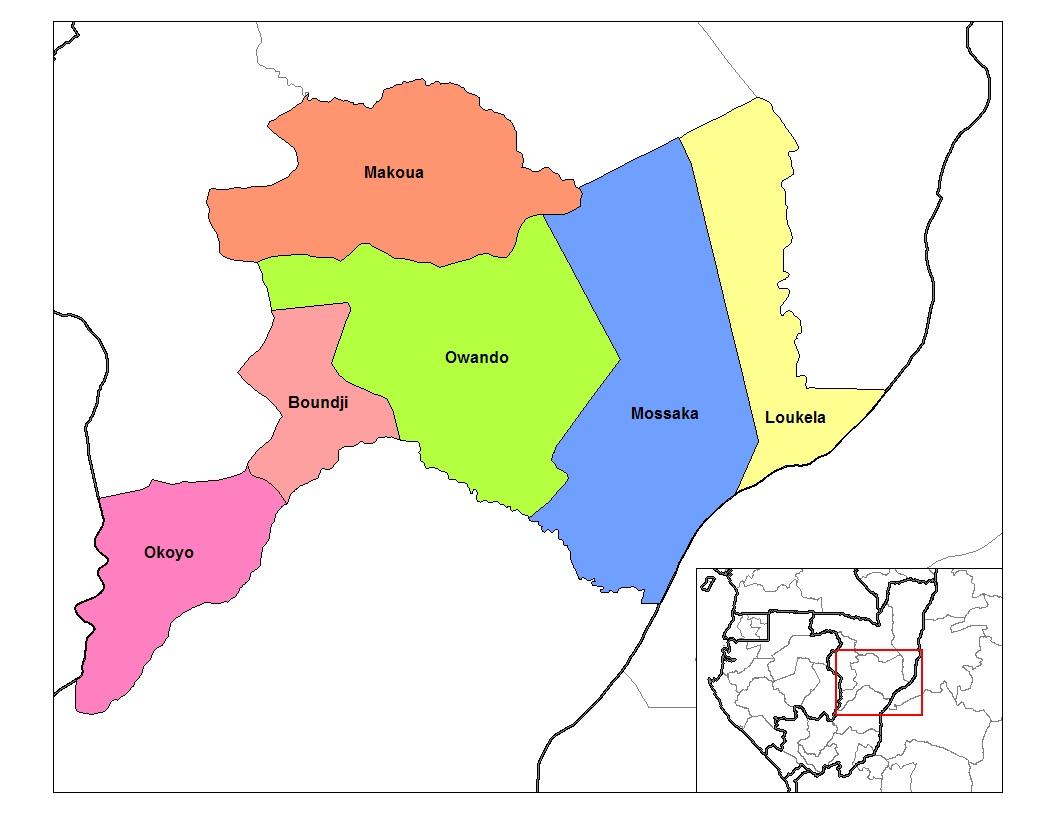
Districts of Cuvette

- Boundji District
- Loukela District
- Makoua District
- Mossaka District
- Okoyo District
- Owando District

==== Cuvette-Ouest Department ====
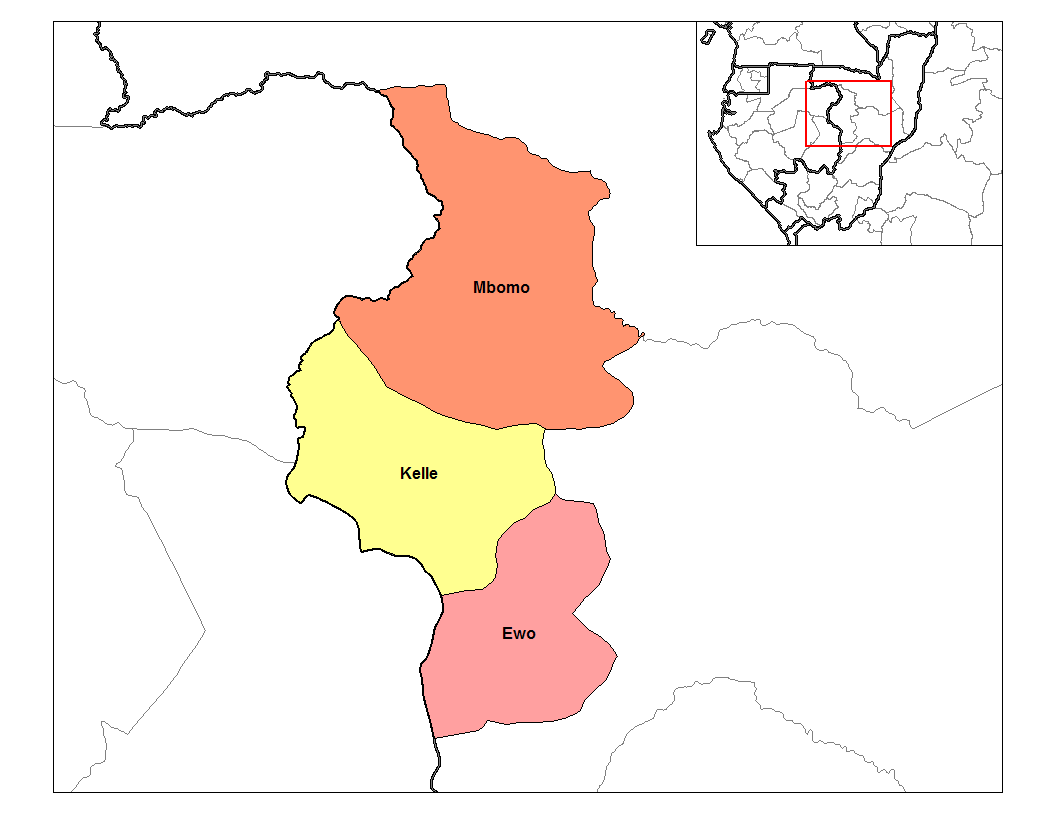
Districts of Cuvette-Ouest

- Ewo District
- Kelle District
- Mbomo District

==== Likouala Department ====
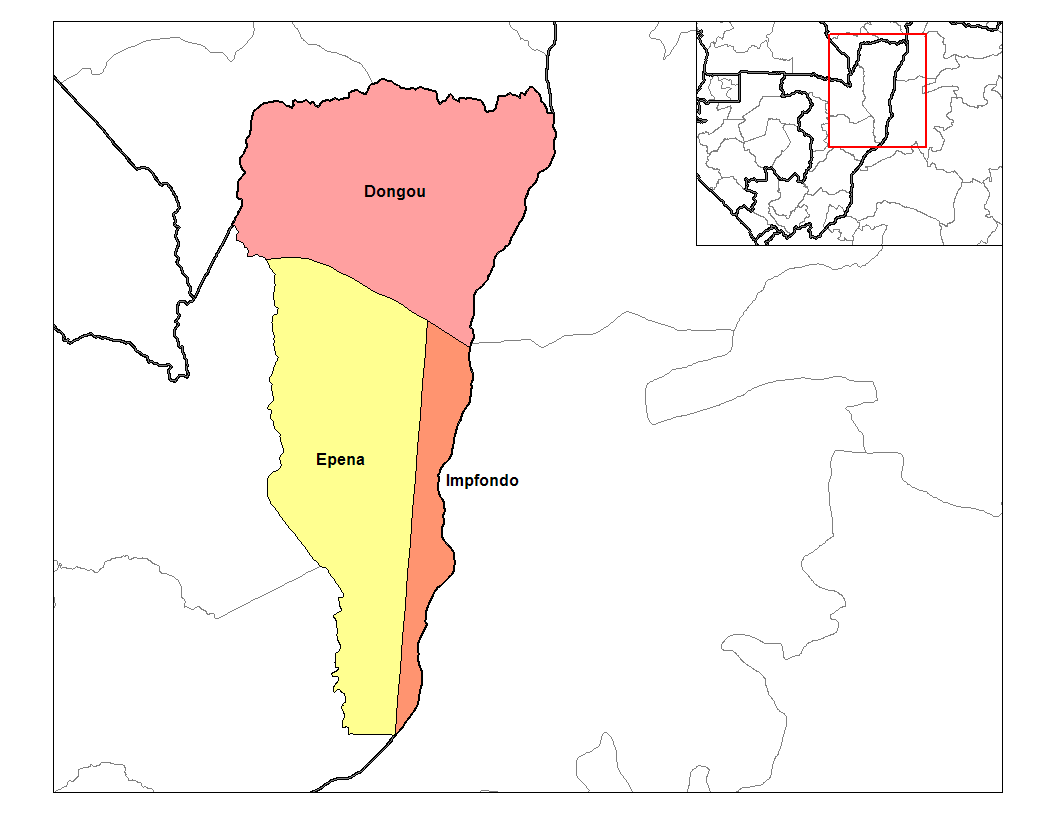
Districts of Likouala

- Dongou District
- Epena District
- Impfondo District

==== Plateaux Department ====
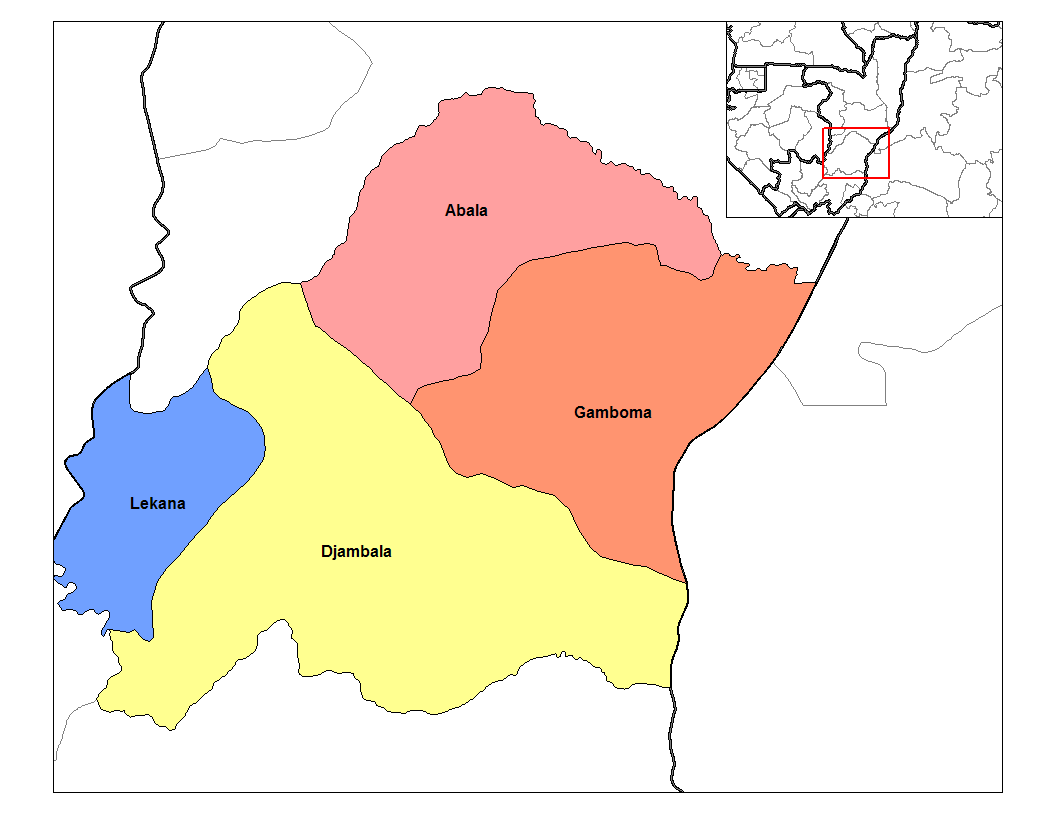
Districts of Plateaux

- Abala District
- Djambala District
- Gamboma District
- Lekana District

==== Sangha Department ====
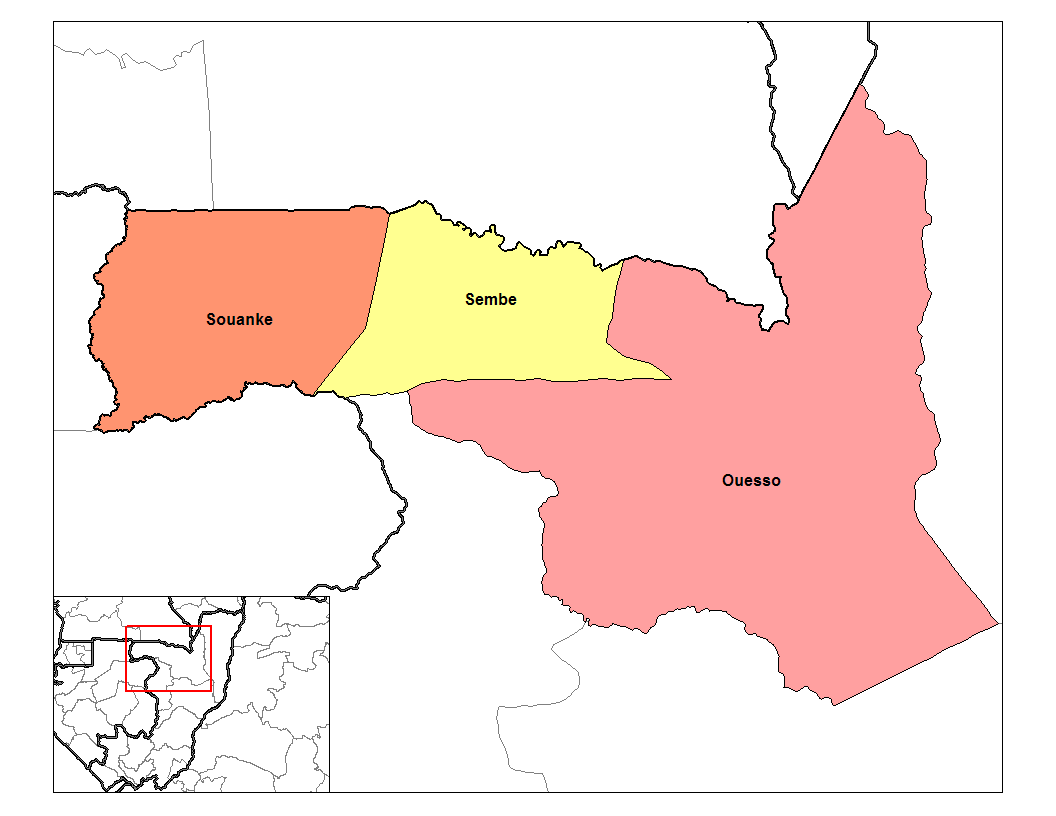
Districts of Sangha

- Ouésso District
- Sembé District
- Souanke District

=== Southern Congo ===
==== Bouenza Department ====
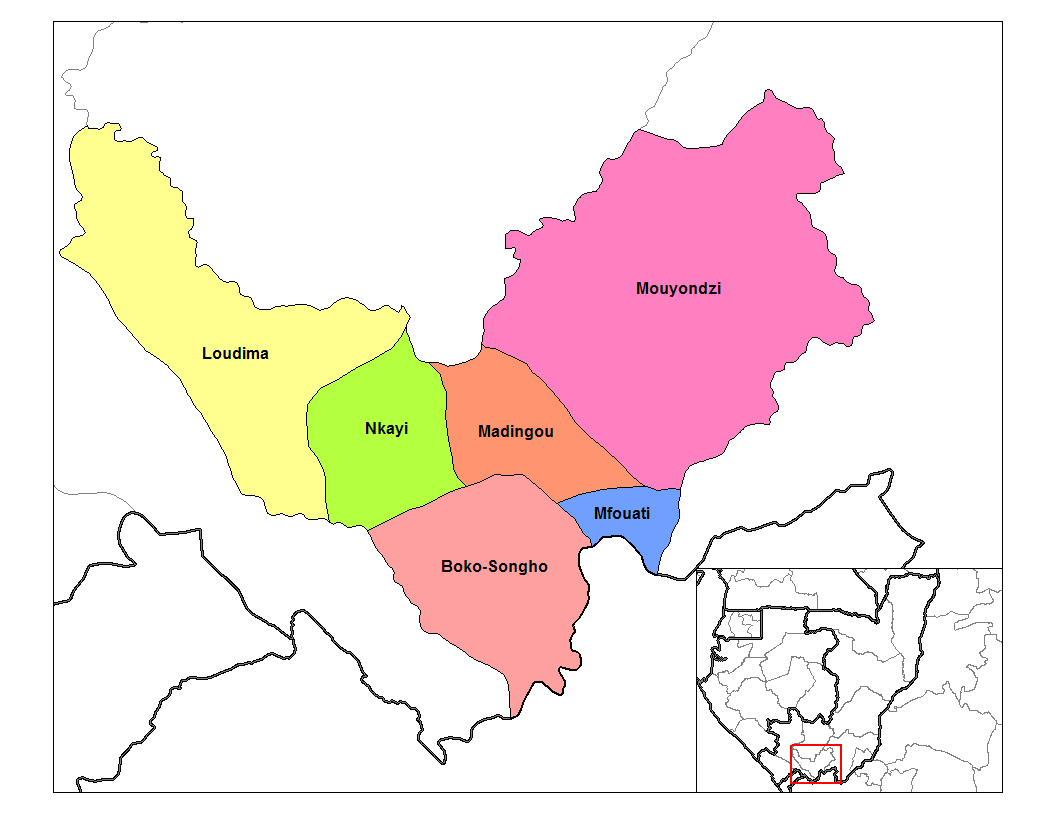
Districts of Bouenza

- Boko-Songho District
- Loudima District
- Madingou District
- Mfouati District
- Mouyondzi District
- Nkayi District

==== Kouilou Department ====
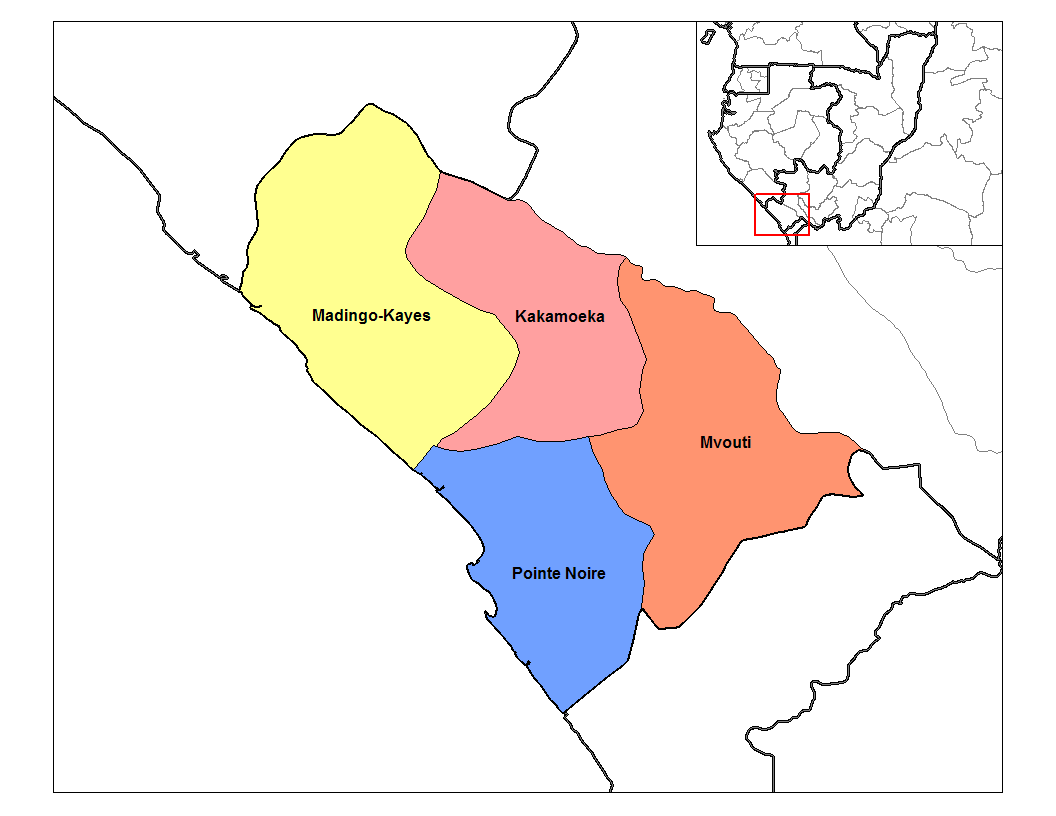
Districts of Kouilou

- Kakamoeka District
- Madingo-Kayes District
- Mvouti District
- Pointe-Noire District

==== Lékoumou Department ====
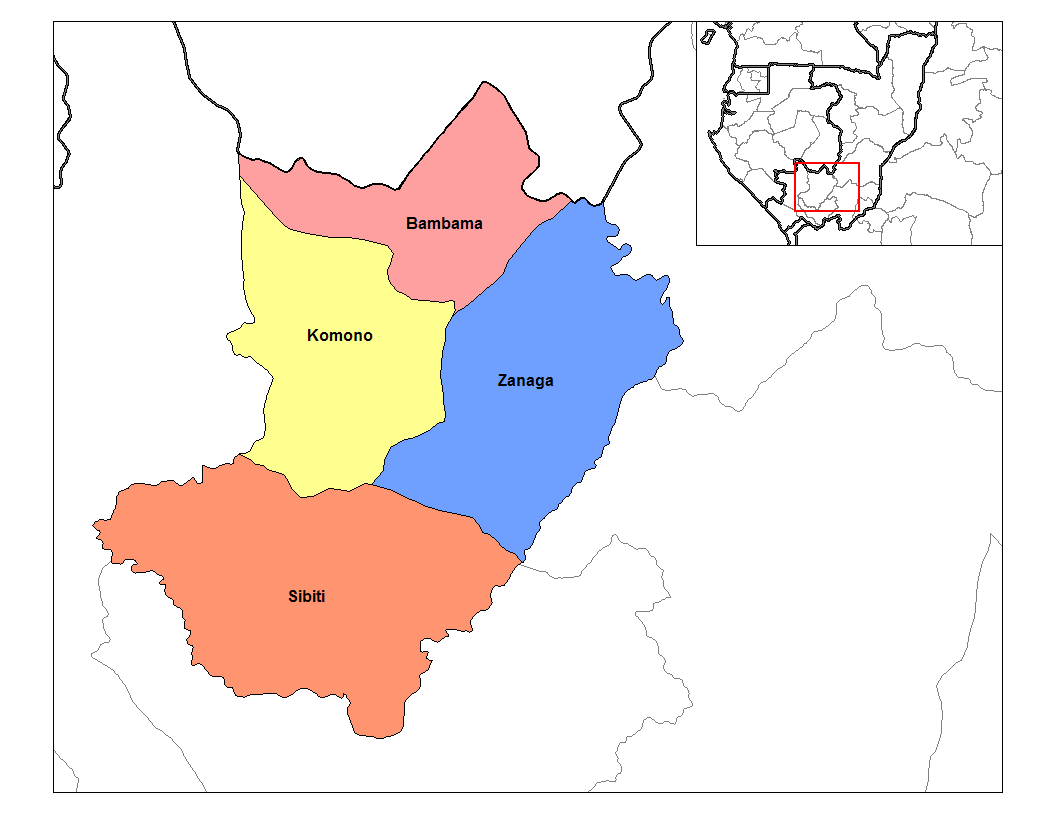
Districts of Lekoumou

- Bambama District
- Komono District
- Sibiti District
- Zanaga District

==== Niari Department ====
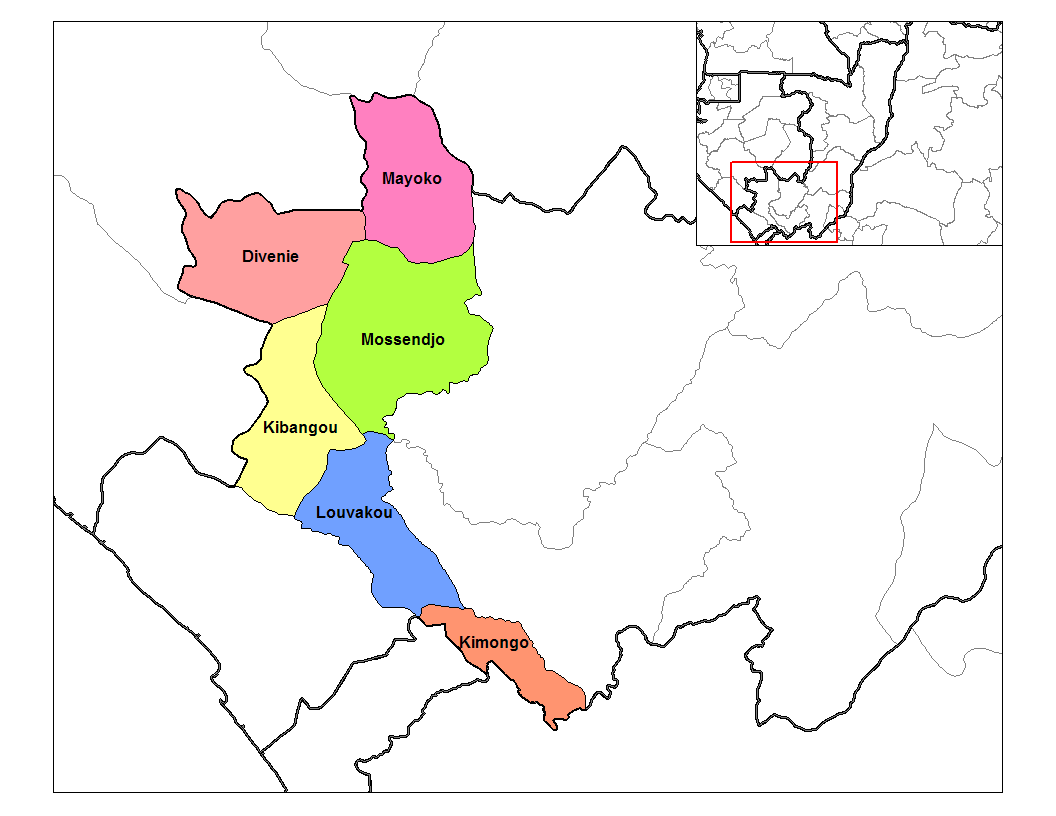
Districts of Niari

- Divenie District
- Kibangou District
- Kimongo District
- Louvakou District
- Mayoko District
- Mossendjo District

==== Pool Department ====
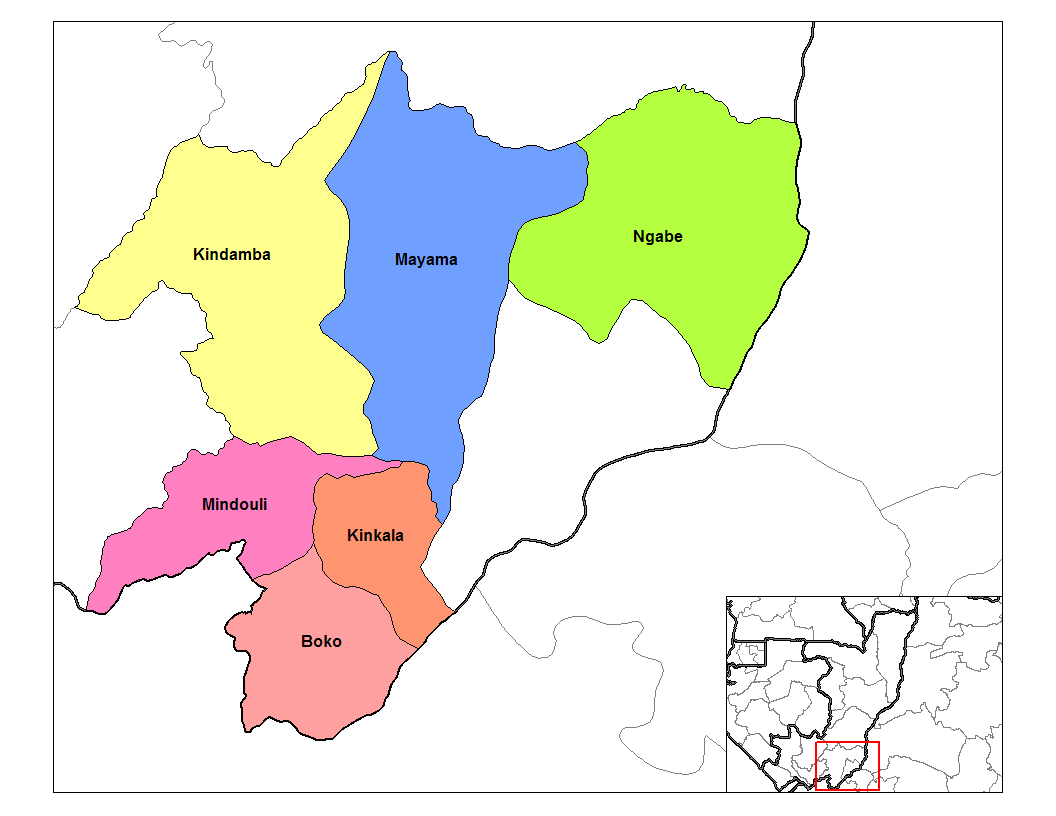
Districts of Pool

- Boko District
- Kindamba District
- Kinkala District
- Mayama District
- Mindouli District
- Ngabe District

== See also ==
- Departments of the Republic of the Congo
