= List of cities in the Republic of the Congo =

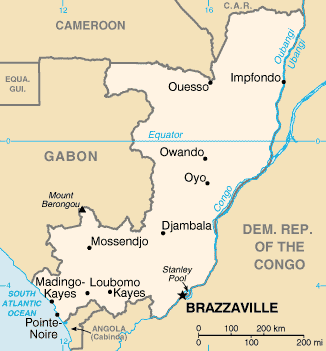
Map of Republic of the Congo

This is a list of cities and towns in the Republic of the Congo with population of 4,000 or more, according to 2023 census.

== List ==
Rank	Coordinates	City / town	Department	Population (2007 census)	Population (2023 census)
1	4°16′10″S 15°16′16″E	Brazzaville	Brazzaville	1,373,382	2,138,236
2	4°47′51″S 11°51′1″E	Pointe-Noire	Pointe-Noire	715,334	1,398,812
3	4°12′2″S 12°40′45″E	Dolisie	Niari	83,798	178,172
4	4°11′3″S 13°17′18″E	Nkayi	Bouenza	71,620	104,083
5	1°36′38″N 16°3′5″E	Ouésso	Sangha	28,179	75,095
6	4°8′9″S 15°20′57″E	Kintélé	Brazzaville		71,629
7	1°9′37″S 15°58′25″E	Oyo	Cuvette	14,295	63,598
8	3°03′34″N 18°30′51″E	Bétou	Likouala	11,240	59,563
9	1°52′16″S 15°52′41″E	Gamboma	Nkéni-Alima	18,514	52,652
10	0°29′0″S 15°53′51″E	Owando	Cuvette	24,736	48,642
11	04°09′51″S 13°33′06″E	Madingou	Bouenza	25,713	43,787
12	1°37′7″N 18°3′44″E	Impfondo	Likouala	33,911	38,240
13	0°0′24″S 15°37′5″E	Makoua	Cuvette	14,240	34,408
14	3°41′6″S 13°21′4″E	Sibiti	Lékoumou	22,951	33,887
15	1°13′33″S 16°47′41″E	Mossaka	Congo-Oubangui	15,112	31,347
16	4°16′29″S 14°21′27″E	Mindouli	Pool	14,541	29,603
17	1°24′42″N 16°19′22″E	Pokola	Sangha	10,465	28,570
18	0°52′27″S 14°49′0″E	Ewo	Cuvette-Ouest	8,142	28,229
19	4°13′4″S 13°45′46″E	Bouansa	Bouenza	19,064	26,265
20	4°17′50″S 13°51′20″E	Loutété	Bouenza	19,212	26,176
21	2°32′24″S 14°45′7″E	Djambala	Plateaux	10,652	24,734
22	4°21′24″S 14°45′32″E	Kinkala	Pool	8,600	23,413
23	4°6′44″S 13°3′36″E	Loudima	Bouenza	14,130	21,623
24	3°59′44″S 13°55′19″E	Mouyondzi	Bouenza	12,695	21,215
25	2°29′5″S 15°44′49″E	Ngo	Plateaux	10,121	19,508
26	1°1′39″S 15°21′33″E	Boundji	Cuvette	7,085	16,637
27	2°56′43″S 12°42′56″E	Mossendjo	Niari	13,238	15,003
28		Ignié	Djoué-Léfini	2,824	14,932
29	2°48′43″N 18°0′49″E	Enyellé	Likouala	6,027	14,674
30	2°3′N 18°3′E	Dongou	Likouala	7,060	13,433
31	1°2′17″S 17°6′42″E	Loukoléla	Congo-Oubangui	5,268	12,406
32	1°16′12″S 15°53′47″E	Ollombo	Nkéni-Alima	5,420	11,878
33	4°58′51″S 12°2′19″E	Tchiamba-Nzassi	Pointe-Noire	5,962	11,167
34	0°1′15″N 14°53′36″E	Etoumbi	Cuvette-Ouest	7,719	10,631
35		Souanké	Sangha	3,945	10,599
36	1°39′19″N 14°34′15″E	Sembé	Sangha	4,957	9,416
37	3°44′5″S 14°30′35″E	Kindamba	Pool	5,980	9,270
38	3°29′0″S 12°36′24″E	Makabana	Niari	9,286	7,347
39		Mokéko	Sangha	3,990	5,723
40		Epena	Likouala	2,257	5,190
41	3°16′34″S 13°13′30″E	Komono	Lekoumou	6,354	5,122
42	2°19′27″S 14°35′26″E	Lekana	Plateaux	4,039	4,707
43		Ngabé	Djoué-Léfini	1,738	4,630
44	0°3′39″S 14°29′16″E	Kellé	Cuvette-Ouest	6,298	4,541
38		Okoyo	Cuvette-Ouest		4,270
