= Subdivisions of the Republic of the Congo =

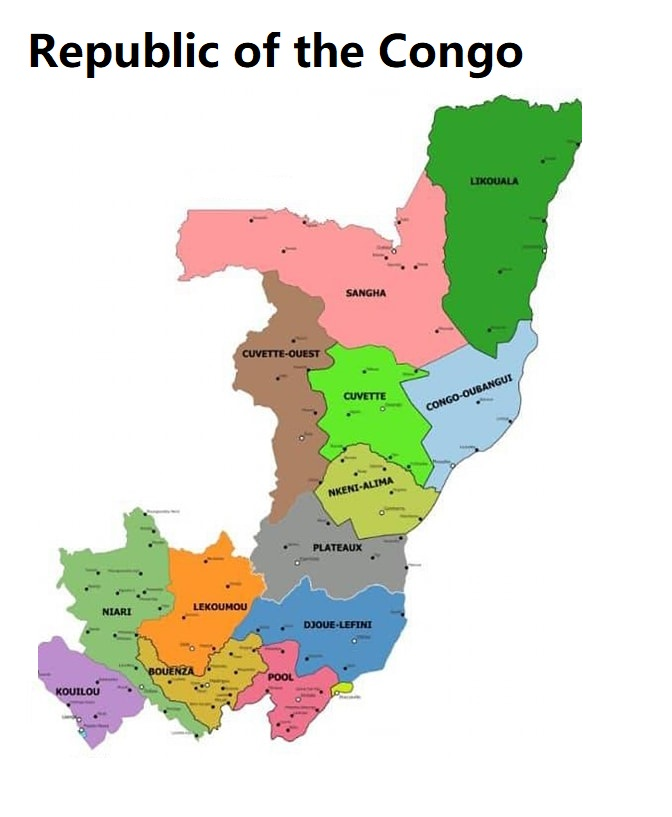
Departments of the Republic of the Congo

The Republic of the Congo is divided into 15 departments since the adoption of the corresponding laws in October 2024. Departments are divided into communes and/or districts; which are further subdivided into urban communities (communautés urbaines) and rural communities (communautés rurales); which are further subdivided into quarters or neighborhoods (quartiers) and villages.

The departments are:

- Brazzaville
- Bouenza
- Congo-Oubangui
- Cuvette
- Cuvette-Ouest
- Djoué-Léfini
- Kouilou
- Lékoumou
- Likouala
- Niari
- Nkéni-Alima
- Plateaux
- Pool
- Sangha
- Pointe-Noire
