= Moembe =

- Location in the Republic of the Congo
- Coordinates: 2°55′0″S 15°38′0″E
- Country: Republic of the Congo
- Departments: Plateaux Department
- District: Lekana District
- Time zone: UTC+1 (WAT)

Moembe is a town in Djambala District in the Plateaux Department of the Republic of the Congo. It lies in the Lefini Reserve on the Lefini River, south of Etsouali and on the N2 road. The primary language for occupants here is French, the nearest city is Kikwit at 170 km.
