= Onianva =

- Location in the Republic of the Congo
- Coordinates: 2°20′50″S 15°48′50″E
- Country: Republic of the Congo
- Departments: Plateaux Department
- District: Lekana District
- Time zone: UTC+1 (WAT)

Onianva is a town in Lekana District in the Plateaux Department of the Republic of the Congo. It lies to the north of the Lefini Reserve, north of Etsouali and on the N2 road.
