= Etsouali =

- Location in the Republic of the Congo
- Coordinates: 2°51′22″S 15°32′58″E
- Country: Republic of the Congo
- Department: Plateaux
- District: Ngo
- Time zone: UTC+1 (WAT)

Etsouali is a small town in Ngo District in the Plateaux Department of the Republic of the Congo.

It lies in the Léfini Faunal Reserve, north of Moembe and around 180 kilometres north of Brazzaville on the N2 road.

== History ==
On 12 March 1992, a Twin Otter of the Lina Congo airline crashed during a thunderstorm near Etsouali during a flight from Maya Maya Airport in Brazzaville. The crash killed three crew members, but the five passengers survived.
