= Alain Akouala Atipault =

Congolese politician

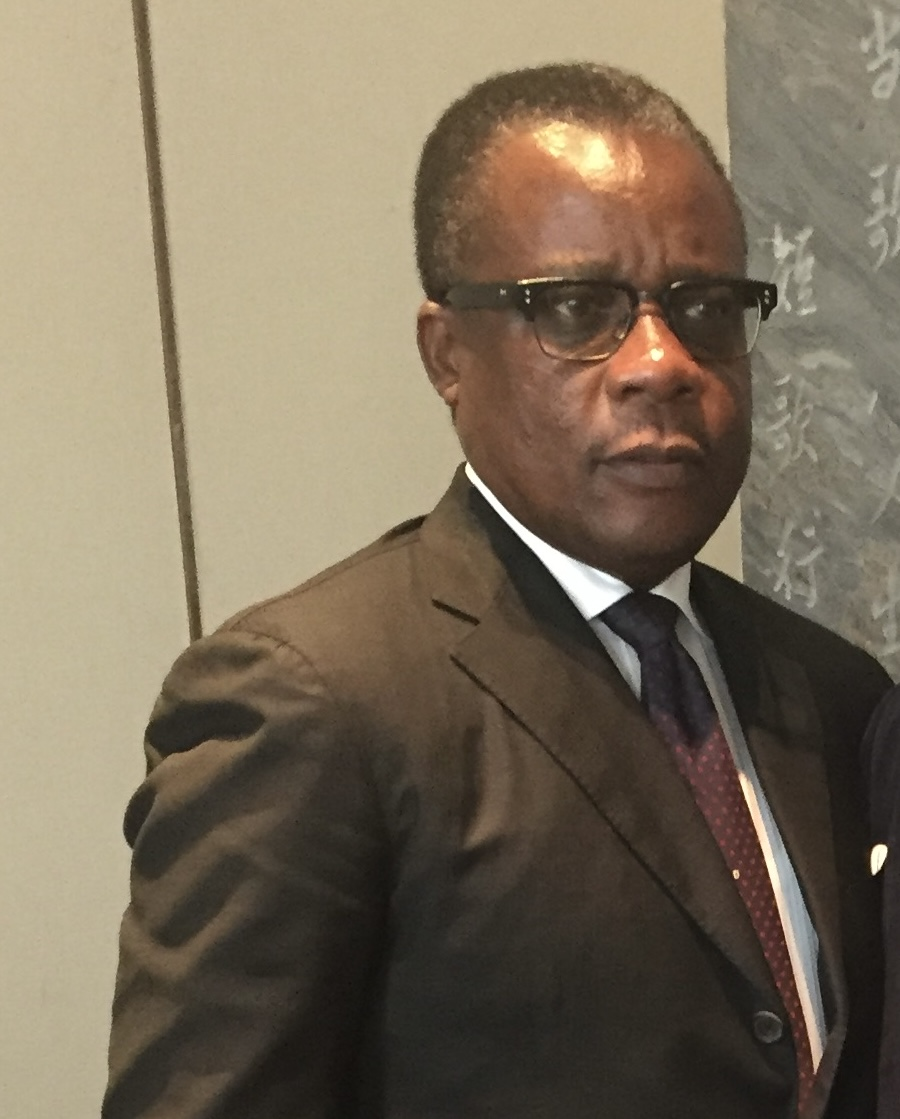
Alain Akouala in 2016

Alain Akouala Atipault (born 1959) is a Congolese politician who served in the government of Congo-Brazzaville as Minister of Communication from 2002 to 2009. Subsequently he was Minister of Special Economic Zones from 2009 to 2015 and again from 2016 to 2017.

== Political career ==
Akouala Atipault was born in Brazzaville. In 1995, he became a communications adviser to the Committee for the Privatization of State Enterprises; he also served for a time as communications adviser to the National Oil Company of Congo (Société nationale des pétroles du Congo, SNPC). At the time of the March 2002 presidential election, he was the spokesman for President Denis Sassou Nguesso's campaign. In the absence of any serious competitors, Sassou Nguesso's victory was viewed as a foregone conclusion. As campaign spokesman, Akouala Atipault argued that the election was fair, although he acknowledged that there were some "minor problems" in the process. After the election, Akouala Atipault was appointed to the government as Minister of Communication and Relations with Parliament, as well as Government Spokesman, on 18 August 2002. He was derisively dubbed "the minister of denial" by opposition media.

In response to "misconceptions" in The Washington Times, Akouala Atipault wrote a commentary piece for that paper that was published on 11 June 2006. He defended President Sassou Nguesso and the government's policies, arguing that Congo-Brazzaville was heavily burdened by debt and badly needed debt relief.

Akouala Atipault was the National President of Citizen Force, a political association, as of 2007. In the June–August 2007 parliamentary election, he stood as a candidate in the second constituency of Gamboma, but he was defeated by Guy Timothée Ngantsio Gambou. He appealed to the Constitutional Court, but his appeal was rejected.

During the campaign for the 12 July 2009 presidential election, Akouala Atipault worked on Sassou Nguesso's campaign as head of the foreign relations department. In the election, Sassou Nguesso faced an anemic field of competitors, thinned by boycotts and disqualifications. Akouala Atipault dismissed the opposition's claims of fraud as "incorrect" and claimed that the presence of 170 international observers disproved the accusations of fraud. According to Akouala Atipault, the opposition's claim that voter turnout was only 10% was "ludicrous".

Following Sassou Nguesso's victory, Akouala Atipault was moved to the post of Minister at the Presidency for Special Economic Zones as part of a cabinet reshuffle on 15 September 2009.

When scandal erupted in October 2009 over a book foreword supposedly written by Nelson Mandela for a collection of interviews with Sassou Nguesso, with Mandela's foundation claiming he had neither read the book in question nor authorised his name to be associated with it, Akouala Atipault again came to the Congolese president's defense. Arguing that the Congolese people needed nobody's permission to use Mandela's name, he told an interviewer that "Mandela doesn't even belong to himself. He belongs to us." Akouala Atipault went on to urge legal action against the Nelson Mandela Foundation, which he described as "an organization that, in reality, has nothing to do with the personality of Nelson Mandela," and condemned it as a commercial concern linked with "savage capitalism and international finance."

As Minister for Special Economic Zones, Akouala Atipault was responsible for the implementation of four special economic zones at Ouesso, Oyo–Ollombo, Brazzaville, and Pointe-Noire. He visited Mauritius for a week in late 2013, and in a subsequent interview he discussed the importance of developing a partnership between the two countries and learning from the economic experience of Mauritius. He also discussed the need to diversify Congo-Brazzaville's economy beyond its reliance on oil through the development of the special economic zones.

Speaking at a meeting in Brazzaville on 10 June 2015, Akouala Atipault articulated the ruling Congolese Labour Party's reasons for wanting to change the constitution. While the opposition viewed the proposed change as merely a means of facilitating another term for Sassou Nguesso, Akouala Atipault framed the change in terms of improved governance.

On 10 August 2015, Akouala Atipault was dismissed from the government; he was expected to replace the retiring Henri Lopes as Ambassador to France. He was included on Sassou Nguesso's campaign team for the March 2016 presidential election as head of electoral operations. After Sassou Nguesso's victory, he was reappointed as Minister of Special Economic Zones on 30 April 2016.

Akouala Atipault was dismissed from the government on 22 August 2017, and Gilbert Mokoki was appointed to succeed him as Minister of Special Economic Zones.
