= EWO =

Ewo or EWO may refer to:

- Ewo, Republic of the Congo, a village in the Cuvette-Ouest Department
  - Ewo Airport
  - Ewo District
- Ewo (hong), a Qing dynasty hong
- Electronic warfare officer
- Emergency War Order
- EWO Brewery
- Ewondo language
- Jon Ewo (born 1957), Norwegian novelist
