= Etoumbi =

- Location in the Republic of the Congo
- Coordinates: 0°01′15″N 14°53′36″E
- Country: Republic of the Congo
- Department: Cuvette-Ouest
- District: Etoumbi

Population (2023)
  - Total: 10,631

Etoumbi is a town in the Cuvette-Ouest department of northwestern Republic of the Congo. It is the seat of the Etoumbi District. Most of its residents make their living hunting in the local forest.

Etoumbi has been the site of four recent outbreaks of the Ebola virus, believed to have sparked by local villagers eating the flesh of animals that are found dead in the forest. In 2003, 120 people died in an outbreak. An outbreak in May 2005 led to the quarantine of the town.
