= Maurice Pellosh =

Congolese photographer (1951–2023)

Maurice Bidilou
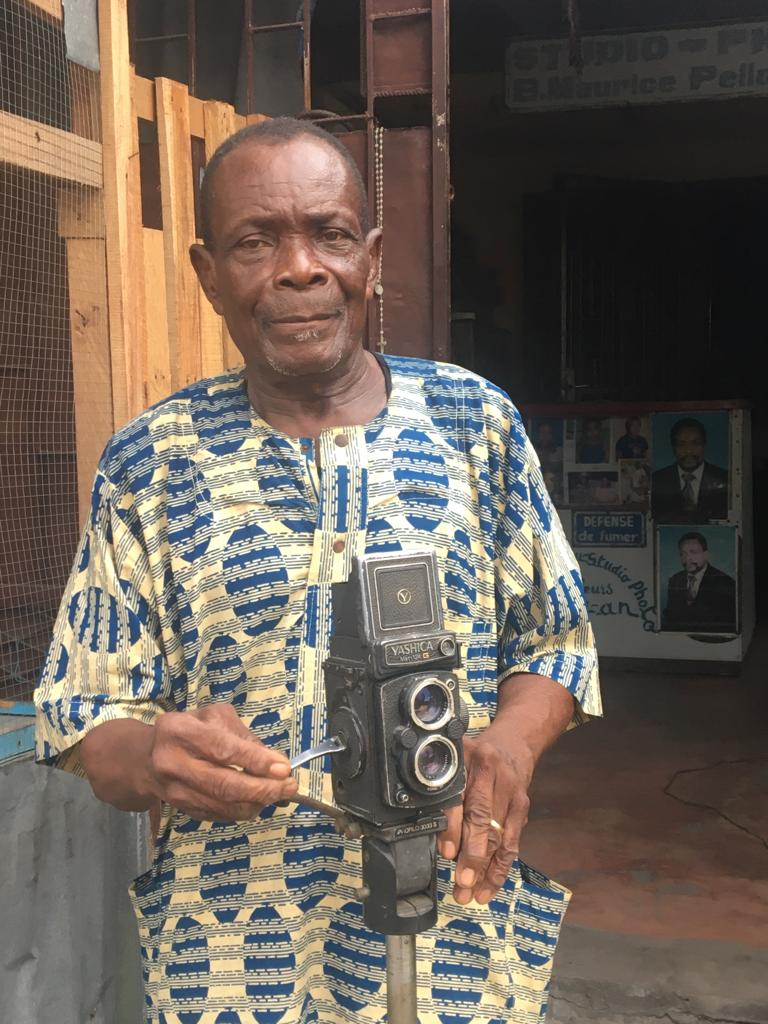
- Maurice Bidilou in 2022
- Born: 15 August 1951; Bouansa, Congo-Brazzaville
- Died: 25 May 2023 (aged 71); Pointe Noire, Congo-Brazzaville
- Occupation: Portrait photographer
- Years active: 43 years

Maurice Bidilou (15 August 1951 – 25 May 2023), also known as Pellosh, was a Congolese portrait photographer. He produced small and medium format photographs of Congolese society through the early 1970s to mid 1990s. He gained newfound recognition in 2021 after a series of solo shows. Before his death, he was described as "one of the last living masters of African photography".

== Early years ==
Pellosh was born in the southern rural area of Bouansa (Congo-Brazzaville), the second of six children. His mother was a field-worker and his father was a warehouseman. At the age of 14 he chose the nickname "Pellosh" based purely on its sound; coincidentally, it is similar to the word "pelloche", a slang term for a strip of film.

He moved to Pointe-Noire at age 17 with his brother. After working a few odd jobs, he decided to pursue photographic studies with the support of his uncle. In 1971, he started an apprenticeship at Studio Janot Père in exchange for a demijohn of wine, a chicken, a bunch of bananas, and 20,000 CFA francs. He spent 20 months learning the practice of studio photography, particularly focusing on the nuances of light and shadow.

== Photographic career ==
In 1973, Pellosh ordered his first camera from France, a 6x6 Yashica Mat-124 G. He worked as a wandering photographer in the Mayombe area, capturing rural life.

He opened his studio, Studio Pellosh, in Pointe-Noire on December 17, 1973. The studio was located in the Rex district, close to the Central Market and Grand Mosque.

Studio Pellosh soon rose in popularity and became a place where families and friends came for a sitting, dressed in their best attire. Among them was the writer Alain Mabanckou, who was photographed at the age of nine. It was particularly popular among participants in La Sape culture, or sapeurs, which was booming at the time; in particular, there was a desire for photographic souvenirs that could be sent to relatives.

Portraiture became a symbol of pride and emancipation in Congo-Brazzaville after the country gained its independence. In the evenings, Pellosh continued to cruise bars, ballrooms and concert halls to capture nightlife scenes.

From the 1980s onwards, Maurice Pellosh moved away from black and white photography to color, due in part to decreasing availability of black-and-white photography development products. In 1993 he contemplated moving the studio to Brazzaville, but the civil war of the 1990s made that impossible. The rise of cheap instant cameras and digital photography in the 2000s led to a declining interest in studio photography, and Pellosh finally closed his studio in 2016. Over the span of 40 years, he captured thousands of portraits and scenes of Congolese society.

Pellosh died on May 25, 2023, at the age of 71, following a fractured hip and a bout of malaria. He had a wife (Jackie), 6 children, and 17 grandchildren.

== Late recognition and legacy ==
In 2019, Pellosh met curator Emmanuèle Béthery in Pointe-Noire through a mutual friend. She described herself as "obsessed" with the yellowed photographs he presented to her. Soon after, she visited Pellosh in his home equipped with a lightbox. Together they began sorting the thousands of 6x6 negatives kept in Kodak boxes for nearly 50 years, decaying from damp and humidity. Béthery sent around 8,000 of these negatives to Stéphane Cormier, a specialist in black and white prints, who confirmed that a majority of the photos could be recovered. Béthery displayed and sold collectible silver prints of the photos on her Instagram page.

The first exhibition, "Flash B(l)ack", was held in Paris in June 2021. The second exhibition, "From West to East", took place in Dar es Salaam in October 2022. The third exhibition, "Faces to Faces", took place in June 2023 in Paris.

As part of the "Traversées Africaines" art tour in Paris, Pellosh's photographs were displayed twice: "Pause Congolaise", the fourth exhibition, was held in May 2024, and "Fringués comme Jamais", the fifth exhibition, was held in May 2025.

Pellosh's photos were presented at the African Book Fair (Salon du Livre Africain) in September 2021 in Paris.

Pellosh's work was showcased through a screening and presentation at the 16th edition of the "Nuits Photographiques de Pierrevert" in July 2024.

A documentary film, "Maurice Pellosh, Capturing Memory", was completed in July 2024. The documentary was shown at the October 2024 Ecrans Noirs Film Festival in Yaoundé, the Abuja Film Festival, the New York Africa Film Festival 2025 in New York City, the 2025 Benin City Film Festival, and the Festival Plan d'Ensemble 2025 in Chateauguay, where it won the award for best international documentary. A screening of the film took place on May 20, 2025, at the Cinéma Saint André des Arts in Paris.

Photographs taken by Pellosh feature in a five-year traveling exhibition across three continents titled "In Slavery's Wake: Making Black Freedom in the World", organized by the United States' National Museum of African American History and Culture, starting in December 2024. The National Historical Museum in Rio de Janeiro is hosting the exhibition from November 13, 2025 to March 26, 2026.

The Photographic Archives Department of the Bibliothèque nationale de France acquired 10 Pellosh photographs in January 2025.

Photographs by Pellosh were showcased in an exhibition dedicated to Congolese rumba, titled "Café Rumba", in partnership with the Royal Muséum for Central Africa in Brussels, during March 2025.

During the first edition of the Pointe-Noire photo festival Ponton Photo, occurring from June 2025 to September 2025, around forty photos by Maurice Pellosh were exhibited.

The French Institute of Gabon in Libreville presented the work of Maurice Pellosh in its "Studios Photos" exhibition from November 2025 to January 2026. Brice Oligui Nguema and Emmanuel Macron visited the exhibition on November 24, 2025.

Photographs by Pellosh were offered for sale at contemporary auctions at Drouot Auction House (Paris) in November 2023, in June 2024, in July 2024 at an auction organized during the Arles Photographic Meetings, and in June 2025.

Currently, over 500 of Pellosh's photos are in exhibitions in France and the United States.
