= Joséphine Mountou-Bayonne =

Congolese politician (1929–2022)

- Born: June 28, 1929; Djambala
- Died: October 24, 2022 (aged 93); France
- Occupation: Politician
- Political party: Congolese Party of Labour
- Awards: Officer of the Congolese Order of Merit; Officer of the National Order of the Lion; Order of the Yugoslav flag with ribbon; Officer of the National Order of the Ivory Coast; Commander of the Order of the Equatorial Star
- Position held: Member of the Senate of the Republic of the Congo, Member of the Senate of the Republic of the Congo (2014–2017), Member of the Senate of the Republic of the Congo

Joséphine Mountou-Bayonne (June 28, 1929 – October 24, 2022) was a Congolese politician. She served in the Senate of the Republic of the Congo since its inception in 1992.

Joséphine Mountou-Bayonne was born on June 28, 1929 in Djambala. She graduated with a degree in university administration in 1963.

She joined the National Movement of the Revolution in 1964 and was a founding member of the Congolese Party of Labour (PCT) in 1972. She served as a deputy in the National Assembly in 1973 to 1978. She became a Senator representing the Plateaux Department in 1992, serving until 1997 when her term was interrupted by the Republic of the Congo Civil War. She again served as a senator from 2002 until her death.

Mountou-Bayonne was a founder of the Revolutionary Union of Congolese Women (URFC) in 1965 and served as its president from 1974 to 1979.

== Awards ==
The awards Joséphine Mountou-Bayonne received include:

- Officer of the Congolese Order of Merit
- Officer of the National Order of the Lion
- Order of the Yugoslav flag with ribbon
- Officer of the National Order of the Ivory Coast
- Commander of the Order of the Equatorial Star
