= Anges Ngapy =

Congolese footballer

Personal information
- Full name: Anges Ngapy
- Date of birth: 2 March 1963 (age 63)
- Place of birth: Kellé, Republic of the Congo
- Position: Forward

Youth career
- 1977–1981: CARA Brazzaville

Senior career*
| Years | Team | Apps | (Gls) |
| 1981–1985 | CARA Brazzaville | | |
| 1985–1990 | Seraing | | |
| 1990–1991 | Genk | | |
| 1991–1992 | Seraing | | |
| 1992–1993 | Berchem | | |
| 1993–1994 | Charleroi | | |
| 1994–1997 | Union St.-Gilloise | | |
| 1997–1999 | Rochefort | | |

International career
| 1984–1993 | Republic of the Congo | 33 | (10) |
- * Club domestic league appearances and goals

Anges Ngapy (born 2 March 1963) is a former Congolese international football forward.

== Career ==
Born in Kellé, Ngapy began playing youth football for local side CARA Brazzaville. In 1981, he joined the club's senior team, where he would win the national championship before leaving to become a professional in 1985.

He moved to Belgium and signed with R.F.C. Seraing. He would spend the rest of his playing career in Belgium, spending time with K.R.C. Genk, K. Berchem Sport, R. Charleroi S.C., R.U. Saint-Gilloise and Rochefort.

Ngapy made several appearances for the Congo national football team, including three FIFA World Cup qualifying matches, and he participated at the 1992 African Cup of Nations finals.
