= Mbama District (Republic of the Congo) =

Mbama
- District
- Interactive map of Mbama
- Country: Republic of the Congo
- Region: Cuvette-Ouest Department

Area
  - Total: 975 sq mi (2,524 km^{2})

Population (2023 census)
  - Total: 12,619
  - Density: 12.95/sq mi (5.000/km^{2})
- Time zone: UTC+1 (GMT +1)

Mbama is a district in the Cuvette-Ouest Department of Republic of the Congo.
