= Arrondissement =

Type of administrative subdivision in Francophone countries

An arrondissement (UK: /æˈrɒndiːsmɒ̃, ˌærɒnˈdiːsmɒ̃/, US: /æˌrɒndiːsˈmɒ̃, -ˌroʊn-, əˈrɒndɪsmənt/, French: [aʁɔ̃dismɑ̃]) is any of various administrative divisions of France, Belgium, Haiti, Cameroon and certain other Francophone countries, as well as the Netherlands.

== Europe ==
=== France ===
The 101 French departments are divided into 342 arrondissements, which may be roughly translated into English as districts. The capital of an arrondissement is called a subprefecture. When an arrondissement contains the prefecture (capital) of the department, that prefecture is the capital of the arrondissement, acting both as a prefecture and as a subprefecture. Arrondissements are further divided into cantons and communes.

==== Municipal arrondissement ====
A municipal arrondissement (French: arrondissement municipal, pronounced [aʁɔ̃dismɑ̃ mynisipal]), is a subdivision of the commune, used in the three of its largest cities: Paris, Lyon, and Marseille. It functions as an even lower administrative division, with its own mayor. Although usually referred to simply as an "arrondissement", they should not be confused with departmental arrondissements, which are groupings of communes within one département. The official translation into English is "district".

=== Belgium ===
Belgium is a federalized country which geographically consists of three regions, of which only Flanders (Flemish Region) and Wallonia (Walloon Region) are subdivided into five provinces each; the Brussels-Capital Region is neither a province nor is it part of one.

In Belgium, there are administrative, judicial and electoral arrondissements. These may or may not relate to identical geographical areas.

- The 43 administrative arrondissements are an administrative level between the municipalities and the provinces.
- Belgium has 12 judicial arrondissements.
- For the elections of the Parliament of Wallonia, 13 electoral arrondissements (or grouped arrondissements) are used as electoral districts.
  - Until 2002, the electoral districts for the Chamber of Representatives were electoral arrondissements; at present these are provincial constituencies and one for Brussels-Capital. The electoral districts Brussels-Halle-Vilvoorde and Leuven still existed until 2012.
  - Electoral arrondissements were also used for the Flemish Parliament elections, until 2004 when they were changed to provincial electoral districts.

=== Netherlands ===
In the Netherlands an arrondissement is a judicial jurisdiction.

=== Switzerland ===
Subdivisions of the canton of Bern include districts since 2010, which are called arrondissements administratifs in French.

=== Post-Soviet states ===
In some post-Soviet states, there are cities that are divided into municipal raioni similar to how some French cities are divided into municipal arrondissements (see e.g. Raions of cities in Ukraine, Municipal divisions of Russia, Administrative divisions of Minsk, Tashkent in Uzbekistan).

== Francophone Africa ==
Most nations in Africa that have been colonized by France have retained the arrondissement administrative structure. These are normally subunits of a department and may either contain or be coequal with communes (towns). In Mali the arrondissement is a subunit of a cercle, while in some places arrondissements are essentially subdistricts of large cities.

- Each of Senegal's departments is subdivided into arrondissements. Dakar is further subdivided into arrondissements; see Arrondissements of Senegal.
- Between 1962 and 2002, each of Niger's departments was subdivided into arrondissements; see Arrondissements of Niger: Since 2002, they have been renamed Departments (with the former Departments renamed Regions).
- Each of Mali's cercles is subdivided into arrondissements; see Cercles of Mali for maps of arrondissements by cercle.
- Each of Benin's departments is subdivided into communes, which are in turn subdivided into arrondissements: they sit above villages in Benin's structure; see Communes of Benin for maps of communes by Department.
- Each of Cameroon's departments is subdivided into arrondissements: they sit above subdistricts and communes in Cameroon's structure; see Departments of Cameroon for maps of arrondissements by Department.
- Since 2002, Chad retains arrondissements only in the city of N'Djamena, which is divided into 10 municipal arrondissements.
- Djibouti retains arrondissements only in the city of Djibouti City, which is divided into six arrondissements.
- Morocco's cercles are subdivided into communes rurales, municipalities, communes urbaines, and arrondissements, depending on the classification of the community.
- The Republic of the Congo retains arrondissements only in the city of Brazzaville, which is divided into seven arrondissements. See Administrative divisions of the Republic of the Congo.

== North America ==
=== Haiti ===
As of 2015, Haiti's ten departments are sub-divided into 42 arrondissements.

=== Quebec ===
In the Canadian province of Quebec, eight cities are divided into arrondissements, known as boroughs in English. In Quebec, boroughs are provincially organized and recognized sub-municipal entities that have mayors and councilors.
