= DJM (disambiguation) =

DJM may refer to:

- DJM, a range of DJ mixers made by Pioneer Electronics
- Dwight's Journal of Music, the music journal
- DJM Records, the record label
- Djambala Airport, the IATA code DJM
- Jamsai Dogon, the ISO 639-3 code DJM
- DJ mix, a sequence of musical tracks typically mixed together to appear as one continuous track
