= Mpouya District =

Mpouya
- District
- Interactive map of Mpouya
- Country: Republic of the Congo
- Region: Plateaux Department

Area
  - Total: 1,066 sq mi (2,762 km^{2})

Population (2023 census)
  - Total: 17,603
  - Density: 16.51/sq mi (6.373/km^{2})
- Time zone: UTC+1 (GMT +1)

Mpouya is a district in the Plateaux Department of Republic of the Congo.
