= List of cities in Congo =

List of cities in Congo may refer to:

- List of cities in the Democratic Republic of the Congo
- List of cities in the Republic of the Congo
