= Mbon District =

Mbon
- District
- Interactive map of Mbon
- Country: Republic of the Congo
- Region: Plateaux Department

Area
  - Total: 748 sq mi (1,938 km^{2})

Population (2023 census)
  - Total: 5,711
  - Density: 7.632/sq mi (2.947/km^{2})
- Time zone: UTC+1 (GMT +1)

Mbon is a district in the Plateaux Department of Republic of the Congo.
