= Tchiamba-Nzassi =

- District
- Location within Republic of the Congo
- Coordinates: 4°51′44″S 12°6′5″E
- Country: Republic of the Congo
- Department: Pointe-Noire

Area
  - Total: 586.3 km^{2} (226.4 sq mi)

Population (2023 census)
  - Total: 21,800
  - Density: 37.2/km^{2} (96.3/sq mi)
- Time zone: UTC+1 (GMT +1)

Since 2011, Tchiamba-Nzassi is a district of the Pointe-Noire Department in the Republic of the Congo. The seat is located in the urban community of Tchiamba-Nzassi.

Formerly the district was part of the Kouilou Department.
