= Oyo Ollombo Airport =

Oyo Ollombo Airport Denis Sassou Nguesso Airport
- IATA: OLL; ICAO: FCOD

Summary
- Serves: Oyo, Republic of the Congo
- Location: Ollombo, Nkéni-Alima, Republic of the Congo
- Elevation AMSL: 1,073 ft / 327 m
- Coordinates: 1°13′15″S 15°54′50″E

Map
- Location of airport in the Republic of the Congo

Runways
Direction	Length		Surface
Direction	m	ft	Surface
04/22	3,300	10,827	Concrete
- Source: GCM Google Maps SkyVector

Oyo Ollombo Airport (IATA: OLL, ICAO: FCOD) is an airport serving the city of Oyo in Cuvette Department in the central part of Republic of the Congo. It is 9 kilometres (5.6 mi) southwest of Oyo, near the village of Ollombo in the neighbouring department of Nkéni-Alima.

The Ollombo non-directional beacon (Ident: OTK) is located on the field.

The airport was built between 2001 and 2013 with the help of Chinese financing.

== Airlines and destinations ==
As of August 2016, there were no scheduled services to and from the airport.

== See also ==
- List of airports in the Republic of the Congo
- Transport in the Republic of the Congo
