= Djoué-Léfini Department =

Department of the Republic of the Congo

Djoué-Léfini
- Department
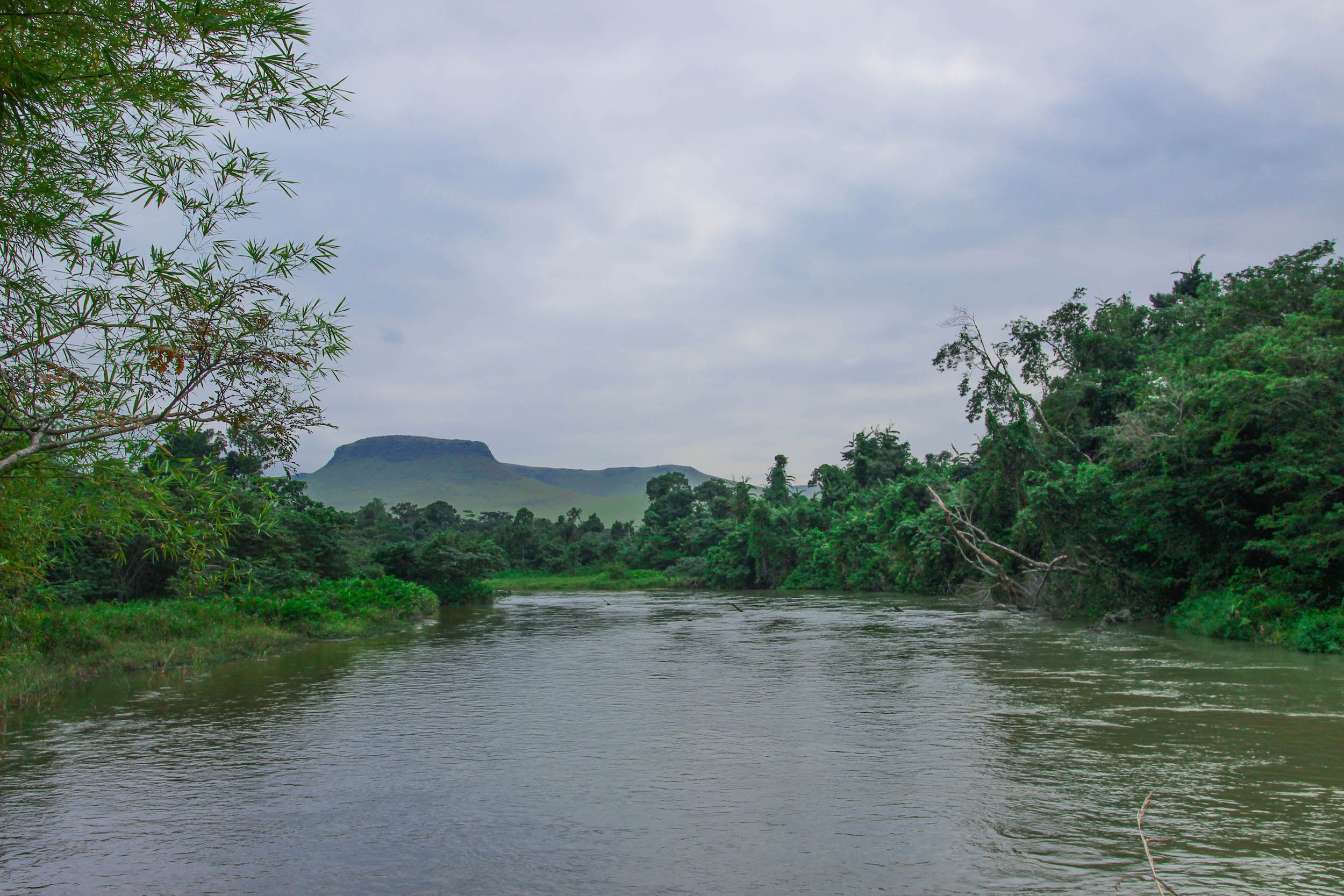
- The Lefini River
- Interactive map of Djoué-Léfini
- Coordinates: 3.5°S 15.5°E
- Country: Republic of the Congo
- Established: 8 October 2024
- Capital: Odziba

Government
  - Prefect: Léonidas Motton Mamoni (PCT)

Area (Note: Calculated by summing the areas of the districts of Ignié, Kimba, Mayama, Ngabé, and Vinza as of their 2023 borders as determined by geospatial data, and subtracting the official area of the commune of Kintélé.)
  - Total: 23,424 km^{2} (9,044 sq mi)

Population (May 2023) (Note: Calculated by summing the populations of the districts of Ignié, Kimba, Mayama, Ngabé, and Vinza as of the 2023 Congolese census, and subtracting the population of the commune of Kintélé.)
  - Total: 103,132
  - Density: 4.4028/km^{2} (11.403/sq mi)
- Time zone: UTC+1 (WAT)

Djoué-Léfini is a department of the Republic of the Congo. It was created on 8 October 2024 from the northern part of Pool Department. Its capital is Odziba. It is named after the Djoué and Lefini rivers.

== Geography and climate ==
Djoué-Léfini borders the departments of Plateaux to the north, Lékoumou to the west, Bouenza to the southwest, and Pool and Brazzaville to the south. Its eastern border is the Congo River: on the other side are the provinces of Maï-Ndombe and Kinshasa of the Democratic Republic of the Congo.

Djoué-Léfini is located on the Mbe Plateau, a component of the Batéké Plateau that stretches north of Brazzaville, the national capital, to the Lefini River. A part of the Western Congolian forest–savanna ecoregion, the Mbe Plateau has an elevation of about 600 m (2,000 ft), and is covered by the grassy savannas and sandy soils. The plateau slopes steeply towards the Lefini and Congo rivers, which form the department's northern and eastern borders respectively. The department was largely deforested in the first decades of the 21st century, due to its proximity to the rapidly growing city of Brazzaville and its population's demand for firewood and charcoal, and only isolated pockets of forest remain.

Lesio-Louna Gorilla Natural Reserve and part of Léfini Faunal Reserve are located in the northern part of the department, and have been collectively designated a Key Biodiversity Area.

Djoué-Léfini experiences a humid tropical climate with average temperature of around 25 °C (77 °F). Annual rainfall ranges from 1,200 to 1,700 mm (47 to 67 in), and the rainy season runs from October to May with a reduction in rain from January to February.

== History ==
Ethnic conflicts in nearby areas of the Democratic Republic of the Congo have displaced hundreds to thousands of refugees into Ignié and Ngabé districts, most recently in 2022–2023 and February 2025.

On 8 October 2024, Congo's National Assembly approved the creation of three new departments: Congo-Oubangui, Djoué-Léfini, and Nkéni-Alima. At the same time, the commune of Kintélé, formerly part of Ignié District, was transferred to Brazzaville, and the district of Odziba was created from Ngabé District. The capital of Djoué-Léfini was chosen to be Odziba, on account of it having a thriving agricultural economy, access to electricity from the Imboulou Dam, and its location on the N2 road. As of 2025 it is temporarily located in Ignié.

== Administration ==
Djoué-Léfini is divided into the six districts of Ignié, Kimba, Mayama, Ngabé, Odziba, and Vinza. The districts of Ignié and Ngabé each contain an urban community (communauté urbaine) of the same name.

The first prefect of Djoué-Léfini is Léonidas Motton Mamoni, who was appointed in April 2025.

== Demographics ==
The territories that now belong to Djoué-Léfini reported a combined population of 103,132 in the 2023 Congolese census. The urban communities of Ignié and Ngabé reported populations of 14,932 and 4,630 in the 2023 census. Villages exceeding four thousand people as of the 2023 census include Imvouba (4,946), Inoni-Plateaux (4,465), and Odziba (4,290).

The three main ethnic groups in Djoué-Léfini are:

- the indigenous people locally known as the Babi, who live in the districts of Kimba, Mayama and Vinza, and continue to practise a foraging lifestyle;
- the Teke people, who represent the first wave of Bantu expansion into the area and whose sovereign or Makoko remains seated at Mbé in the district of Ngabé;
- the Kongo people, nowadays the majority ethnic group in the area.

== Economy and infrastructure ==
Agriculture is the predominant economic activity in Djoué-Léfini, the main crops being manioc, peanuts, plantains, fruits, corn, and vegetables.

The Imboulou Dam on the Lefini River is the largest hydroelectric project in the country, with a capacity of 120 megawatts. It was financed by China and completed in 2011.

Paved roads in the department include:

- the N2 road running through Ignié and Odziba, which links Brazzaville with the north of the country;
- a spur of the N1 road connecting Mindouli via Mayama District to the N2 road at Yié north of Ignié;
- the portion of the N9 road from its intersection with the N1 spur near Mayama southeast towards Brazzaville; the unpaved section of N9 continues beyond Mayama west to Kindamba; and
- a road connecting Inoni-Plateaux to the Imboulou Dam.
