= Kelle Airport =

- IATA: KEE; ICAO: FCOK

Summary
- Airport type: Public
- Serves: Kellé, Republic of the Congo
- Elevation AMSL: 1,526 ft / 465 m
- Coordinates: 0°04′20″S 14°30′25″E

Map
- Location of airport in the Republic of the Congo

Runways
| Direction | Length | | Surface |
| Direction | m | ft | Surface |
|---|---|---|---|
| 14/32 | 1,295 | 4,249 | Grass |
- Source: GCM Google Maps

Kellé Airport (IATA: KEE, ICAO: FCOK) is an airstrip serving the village of Kellé in the Cuvette-Ouest Department, Republic of the Congo. The runway is 1.6 kilometres (0.99 mi) southeast of the village.

== See also ==
- List of airports in the Republic of the Congo
- Transport in the Republic of the Congo
