= Air Congo (disambiguation) =

Air Congo may refer to:

- Air Congo (2024-)
- Air Congo (1961)
- Air Congo (Compagnie Congolaise de Transports Aeriens)
