= Imboulou Dam =

Dam in the Republic of the Congo

- Location within Republic of the Congo
- Official name: Imboulou Dam
- Location: Between Plateaux Department and Djoué-Léfini Department
- Coordinates: 2°56′07″S 16°02′13″E
- Construction began: 2005
- Opening date: 2011
- Construction cost: 170 billion FCFA (340 M$)

Dam and spillways
- Type of dam: Gravity, roller-compacted concrete/Earthen embankment
- Impounds: Léfini River
- Height: 32.5 m (107 ft)
- Length: Gravity dam: 310 m (1,020 ft); Earthen dam: 270 m (886 ft); Total:580 m (1,903 ft)
- Spillway capacity: 1,200 m^{3}/s (42,000 cu ft/s)

Reservoir
- Total capacity: 584,000,000 m^{3} (473,000 acre⋅ft)

Power Station
- Turbines: 4 x 30 MW (40,000 hp) Kaplan turbines
- Installed capacity: 120 MW (160,000 hp)
- Annual generation: 876×10^{6} kWh (3.15×10^{9} MJ)

The Imboulou Dam is a dam on the Léfini River, on the border between Djoué-Léfini Department and Plateaux Department in the Republic of the Congo, about 300 kilometers north of Brazzaville. It was inaugurated by President Denis Sassou-Nguesso on the 7 May 2011.
