= Kelle District =

Coordinates: 0°08′S 14°20′E

Kelle
- District
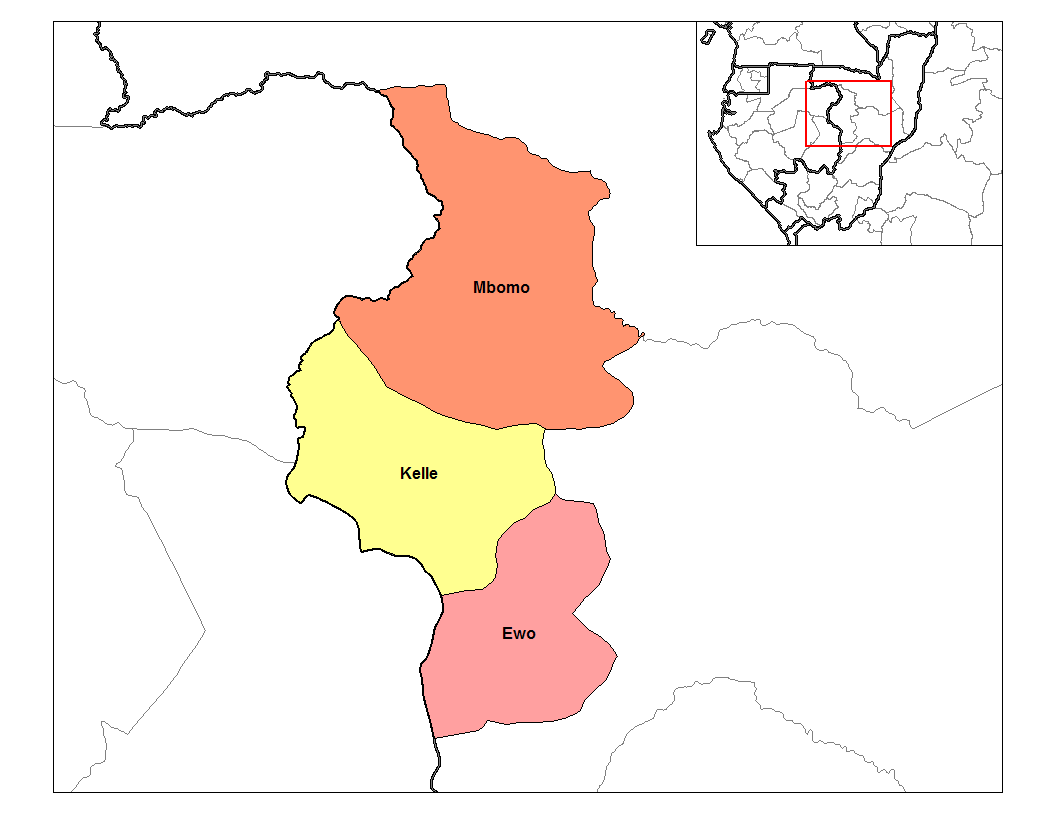
- Kelle District in the region
- Country: Republic of the Congo
- Region: Cuvette-Ouest Region

Area
  - Total: 2,007 sq mi (5,198 km^{2})

Population (2023 census)
  - Total: 15,748
  - Density: 7.847/sq mi (3.030/km^{2})
- Time zone: UTC+1 (GMT +1)

Kelle is a district in the Cuvette-Ouest Region of western Republic of the Congo. The capital lies at Kelle.
