= List of departments of the Republic of the Congo by Human Development Index =

This is a list of the 12 departments of the Republic of the Congo by Human Development Index as of 2023.

Rank	Department	HDI (2023)
High human development
1	Brazzaville	0.707
Medium human development
2	Pointe-Noire	0.696
–	Republic of the Congo	0.649
3	Cuvette Department	0.616
4	Niari Department	0.603
5	Plateaux Department	0.576
6	Bouenza Department	0.563
7	Likouala Department	0.559
Low human development
8	Sangha Department	0.549
9	Cuvette-Ouest Department	0.543
10	Lékoumou Department	0.530
11	Kouilou Department	0.530
12	Pool Department	0.514

== See also ==
- List of countries by Human Development Index
