= Tchiamba-Nzassi, Pointe-Noire =

Tchiamba-Nzassi
- Urban community
- Location in the Republic of the Congo
- Coordinates: 4°58′51″S 12°2′19″E
- Country: Republic of the Congo
- Department: Pointe-Noire
- District: Tchiamba-Nzassi

Population (2023 census)
  - Total: 11,167
- Time zone: UTC+1 (GMT +1)

Tchiamba-Nzassi is an urban community in the Republic of the Congo.

It is the seat of the Tchiamba-Nzassi District in the Pointe-Noire Department.

The town is located on the border of the exclave Cabinda, a Province of Angola.
