= Patrick Lolo =

Congolese footballer

Personal information
- Date of birth: April 25, 1980 (age 46)
- Place of birth: Makotimpoko, People's Republic of the Congo
- Height: 1.79 m (5 ft 10 in)
- Position: Striker

Team information
- Current team: Diables Noirs

Senior career*
Years	Team	Apps	(Gls)
1996–1997	AS Chéminots	?	(?)
1997–1998	AS Chelala	?	(?)
1998–2004	Étoile du Congo	?	(?)
2004–2007	AS Mangasport	?	(?)
2007–2009	Diables Noirs		

International career
2000–2007	Congo	15	(1)
- * Club domestic league appearances and goals as of January 27, 2007

Patrick Lolo (born April 25, 1980 in Makotimpoko) is a Congolese football striker currently playing for Diables Noirs. He is a member of the Congo national football team.

== International career ==
=== International goals ===
Scores and results list Congo's goal tally first.

No	Date	Venue	Opponent	Score	Result	Competition
1.	25 August 2002	Stade Alphonse Massemba-Débat, Brazzaville, Congo	DR Congo	1–1	1–3	Friendly
