= Mayama District =

Coordinates: 3°20′S 14°59′E

Mayama
- District
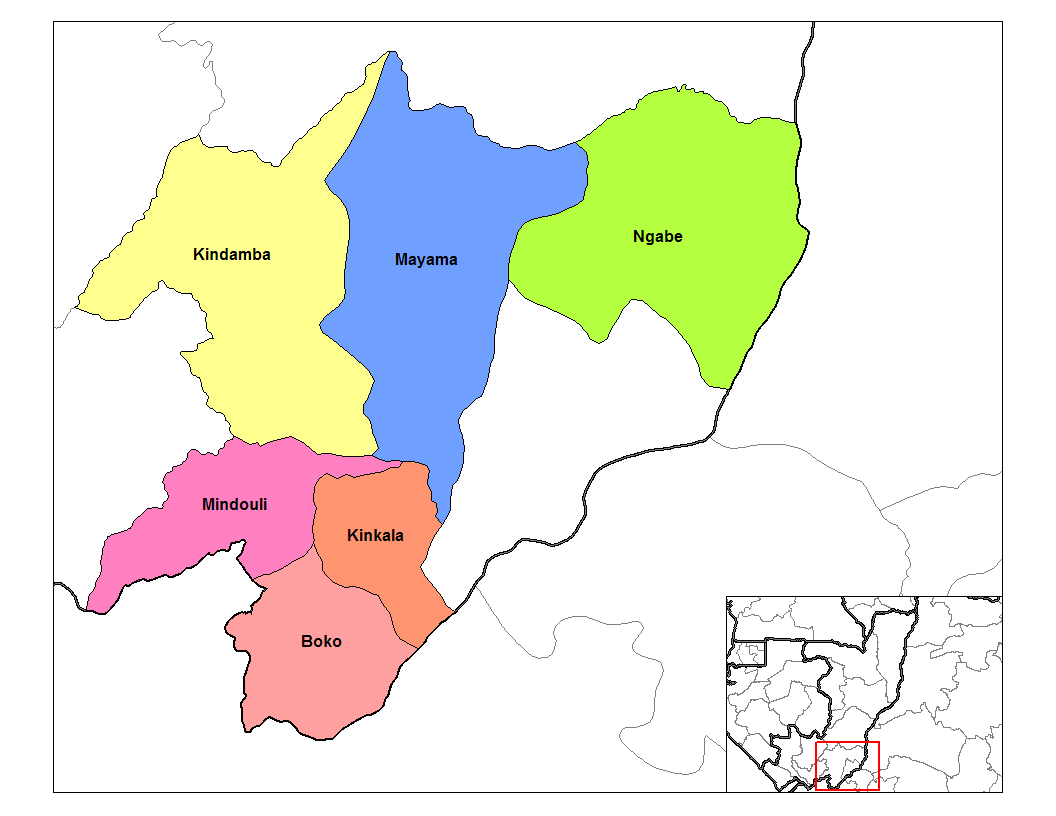
- Mayama District in Pool department prior to 2024
- Country: Republic of the Congo
- Department: Djoué-Léfini

Area
  - Total: 7,243 km^{2} (2,797 sq mi)

Population (2023 census)
  - Total: 5,893
  - Density: 0.8136/km^{2} (2.107/sq mi)
- Time zone: UTC+1 (GMT +1)

Mayama is a district in Djoué-Léfini Department in the Republic of the Congo. The capital lies at Mayama.
