= Djambala District =

Djambala
- District
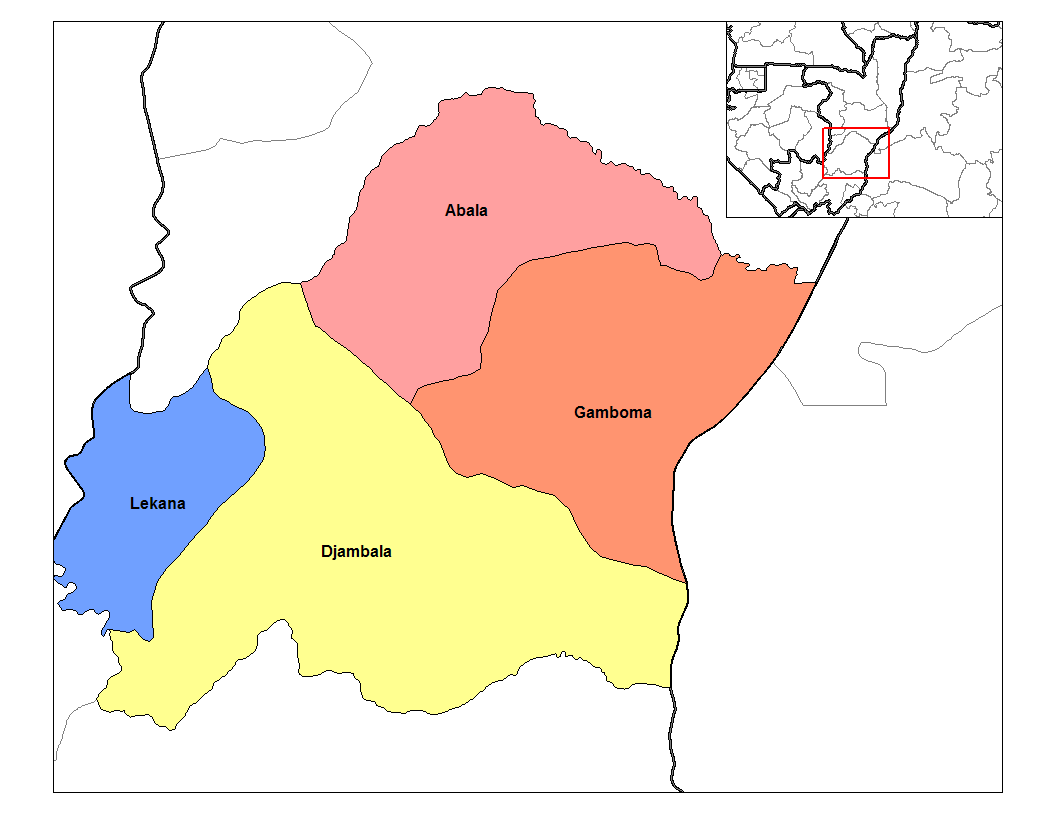
- Djambala District in the region
- Coordinates: 2.538°S 14.754°E
- Country: Republic of the Congo
- Region: Plateaux Region

Area
  - Total: 1,925 sq mi (4,985 km^{2})

Population (2023 census)
  - Total: 29,583
  - Density: 15.37/sq mi (5.934/km^{2})
- Time zone: UTC+1 (GMT +1)

Djambala is a district in the Plateaux Region. The district is located in the center of the Republic of the Congo. The capital of Djambala district is the town of Djambala.
