= Ghislaine Sathoud =

Congolese feminist

- Born: 1969 (age 56–57); Pointe-Noire, Republic of the Congo
- Citizenship: Congo
- Writing career
- Language: French
- Subject: domestic violence

Ghislaine Nelly Huguette Sathoud (born 1969) is a Congolese (living in Canada since 1996) feminist, primarily concerned with domestic violence.

== Life ==
Ghislaine N. H. Sathoud was born on April 8, 1969, in Pointe Noire, Congo-Brazzaville. Her mother was a nurse. Her father, Victor Sathoud, worked in the timber industry and held political posts. She arrived in Canada in 1996 and lives in Montreal. She is a member of a number of literary associations including: the Association des Ecrivains de Langue Française, the Conseil International d'Etudes Francophones and the Union des Auteurs et Artistes Africains au Canada. Sathoud was one of the winners of the Naji Naaman Prize 2008 for her collection of short stories Les trésors du terroir.

She holds an MA in International Relations and obtained a master's degree in political science from the Université du Québec. She has conducted research for the City of Montreal as part of the preparation for the third summit of the citizens on the future of Montreal in 2004. In 2000, she participated in the World March of Women with her play The Evils of Silence. She worked for the Alliance of Cultural Communities for Equality in Health and Social Services (ACCESS). She wrote a play titled Ici, ce n’est pas pareil chérie! which served as a platform for awareness about domestic violence among immigrants.

She is interested in gender issues. She participated in 2005 in a collective book on the African Union and also participated in a collective book on immigration published in Argentina in 2005. Her essay entitled "Women of Central Africa in Quebec" was published in 2006 by Editions L'Harmattan. In 2007, she participated in a collective work titled Imagine, French Without Borders published by the American publisher Vista Higher Learning. In 2008, The International Baccalaureate Organization (IBO), founded in 1968 and located in Switzerland published the new "Market of Hope" on a CD-Rom.

== Family ==
Sathoud has three children.

== Publications ==
- Rendez aux Africaines leur dignité, Éditions L'Harmattan, Paris, 2011. ISBN 978-2-296-54514-4.
- L'Art de la maternité chez les Lumbu du Congo Musonfi, Éditions L'Harmattan, Paris, 2008. ISBN 978-2-296-06059-3.
- L'amour en migration, Éditions Ménaibuc, Paris, 2007. ISBN 978-2-35349-024-0.
- Le combat des femmes au Congo-Brazzaville, Éditions L'Harmattan, Paris, 2007. ISBN 978-2-296-04611-5
- Les femmes d’Afrique centrale au Québec, Éditions L’Harmattan, Paris, 2006. ISBN 2-296-01107-1
- Les Frères de Dieu, Éditions Mélonic, Montréal, 2006, ISBN 2-923080-44-0
- Ici, ce n’est pas pareil chérie! (pièce de théâtre enregistrée sur DVD), 2005
- Hymne à la tolérance, Éditions Mélonic, Montréal, 2004. ISBN 2-923080-30-0
- Itiana, Éditions Carte Blanche, Montréal, 2002,
- Les maux du silence, Maison culturelle Les Ancêtres, Sherbrooke, 2000, ISBN 2-9806882-0-7
- Pleurs du cœur, Expédit, Paris, 1995
- L’Ombre de Banda, C.B.E., Paris, 1990
- Poèmes de ma jeunesse, I.C.A, Pointe-Noire, 1988

=== Collective works ===
- "Des mères et filles exécutantes ", in Revue Interculturel, n°19, Alliance Française de Lecce (Italie), 2015, pp. 325–329.
- "Quand des voies accueillent des sans-voix ", in Revue Interculturel, n°18, Alliance Française de Lecce (Italie), 2014, pp. 279–292.
- "Des mères révolutionnaires ", in Revue Interculturel, n°17, Alliance Française de Lecce (Italie), 2013, pp. 9–14.
- "Redonnons à l'enfance sa noblesse ", in Revue Interculturel, n°16, Alliance Française de Lecce (Italie), 2012, pp. 293–299.
- "Afrique : des vœux collectifs ", in Revue Interculturel, n°15, Alliance Française de Lecce (Italie), 2011, pp. 9–15.
- "Au chevet d'Haïti", in Haïti, je t'aime - Ayiti, mwen renmen ou, Les Éditions du Vermillon, 2010, pp. 197–202.
- "En communion avec nos frères et sœurs d'Haïti", in Pour Haïti, Desnel, 2010, pp. 240–242.
- "Le Marché de l'espoir", D’accord !, Boston, Vista Higher Learning, 2010, pp. 177–183.
- "Une flamme pour vous", Tanbou, Cambridge, USA, 2009.
- "Être immigrante et féministe : comment réussir à concilier intégration et luttes féministes? " Revue FéminÉtudes, Montréal, Institut de recherches et d'études féministes de l'UQAM, vo. 14, no 1, 2009, pp. 28–32.
- "Le Marché de l'espoir", Imaginez, Boston, Vista Higher Learning, 200 pp. 188–192.
- "La paix, à quel prix ?", Pollen d'azur ed. 47, no 25, 2005, Houdrigny (Belgique), pp. 51–55.
- "Union africaine : augmenter la visibilité des femmes ou améliorer les rapports de genre ?" in Yves Ekoué Amaïzo (dir.) L'union africaine freine-t-elle l'unité des africains ? Retrouver la confiance entre les dirigeants et le peuple-citoyen Paris: Menaibuc, 2005, pp. 303–325.
- "El colectivo de la muerte", Salvad a Copito : Pequeñ Buenos Aires : Editorial Clase Turista, 2005, pp. 25–31.
- "Quand les citoyens participent à la vie municipale : le cas de l'arrondissement du Plateau Mont-Royal", in La vie démocratique montréalaise : une revue critique des grands dossiers, Montréal, Sodecm et Sommet de Montréal, 2004, pp. 98–106.
- "Paix sur la terre", Anthologie Nouvelles frontières 11, Toronto : Pearson, 2003, pp. 182–3.

== Awards ==
- 2001, Nomination for the "Gala de Reconnaissance Communautaire" (GRC), category literary encouragement.
- 2008, Naji Naaman literary prize, prize for creativity.
