= Ewo Airport =

- IATA: EWO; ICAO: FCOE

Summary
- Airport type: Public
- Serves: Ewo, Republic of the Congo
- Elevation AMSL: 1,503 ft / 458 m
- Coordinates: 0°51′20″S 14°48′10″E

Map
- Location of airport in the Republic of the Congo

Runways
Direction	Length		Surface
Direction	m	ft	Surface
14/32	2,070	6,791	Asphalt
- Source: GCM Google Maps

Ewo Airport (IATA: EWO, ICAO: FCOE) is an airport serving the village of Ewo in the Cuvette-Ouest Department, Republic of the Congo.

== See also ==
- List of airports in the Republic of the Congo
- Transport in the Republic of the Congo
