= Lékana District =

Coordinates: 2°15′S 14°29′E

Lekana
- District
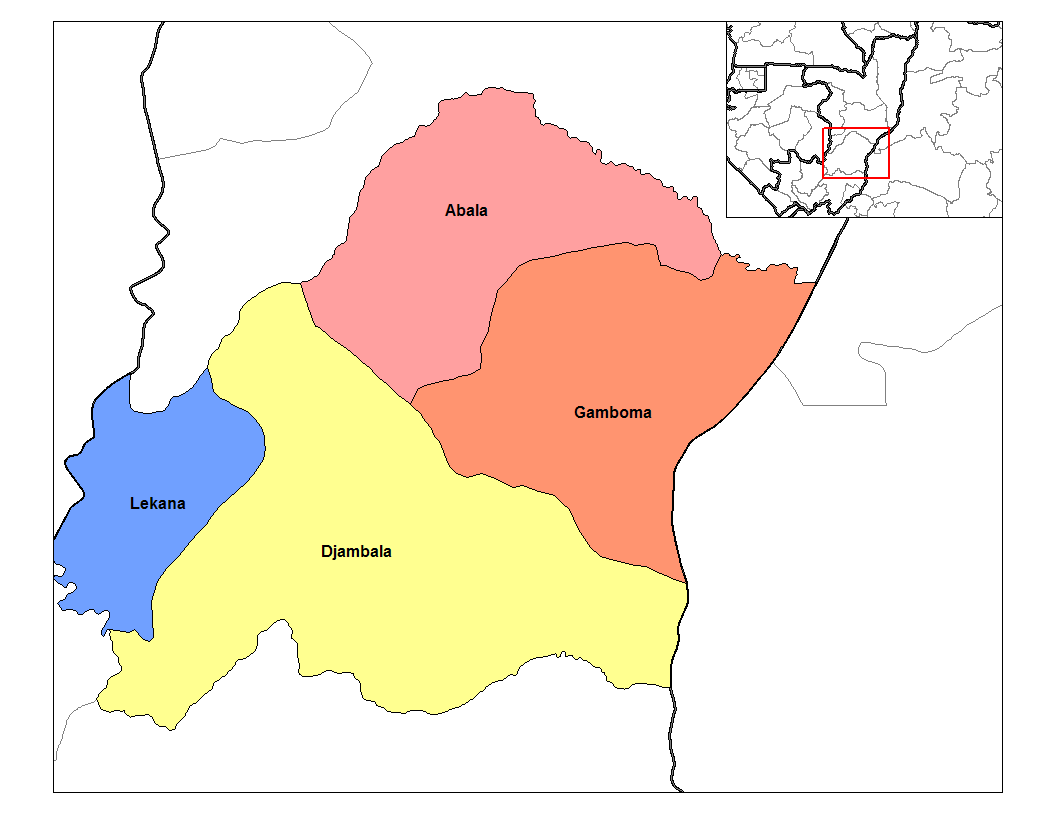
- Lekana District in the region
- Country: Republic of the Congo
- Region: Plateaux Region

Area
  - Total: 2,170 sq mi (5,620 km^{2})

Population (2023 census)
  - Total: 15,257
  - Density: 7.03/sq mi (2.71/km^{2})
- Time zone: UTC+1 (GMT +1)

Lekana is a district in the Plateaux Region of the Republic of the Congo. The capital lies at Lekana.

== Towns and villages ==
- Onianva
