= Gamboma Airport =

- IATA: GMM; ICAO: FCOG

Summary
- Airport type: Public
- Serves: Gamboma, Republic of the Congo
- Elevation AMSL: 1,509 ft / 460 m
- Coordinates: 1°49′50″S 15°53′00″E

Map
- Location of airport in the Republic of the Congo

Runways
Direction	Length		Surface
Direction	m	ft	Surface
05/23	1,760	5,774	Grass
- Source: GCM Google Maps

Gamboma Airport (IATA: GMM, ICAO: FCOG) is an airport serving the city of Gamboma, the capital of Nkéni-Alima Department in the Republic of the Congo. The runway is 5 kilometres (3.1 mi) north of town.

== See also ==
- List of airports in the Republic of the Congo
- Transport in the Republic of the Congo
