= Kimba District =

Kimba
- District
- Location within Republic of the Congo
- Coordinates: 3.5°S 14°E
- Country: Republic of the Congo
- Department: Djoué-Léfini

Area
  - Total: 1,998 km^{2} (771 sq mi)

Population (2023 census)
  - Total: 8,092
  - Density: 4.050/km^{2} (10.49/sq mi)
- Time zone: UTC+1 (GMT +1)

Kimba is a district in the Djoué-Léfini Department of the Republic of the Congo.
