= Vindza District =

Coordinates: 3.41864°S 14.54516°E

Vindza Vinza
- District
- Interactive map of Vindza
- Country: Republic of the Congo
- Department: Djoué-Léfini

Area
  - Total: 3,499 km^{2} (1,351 sq mi)

Population (2023 census)
  - Total: 7,040
  - Density: 2.01/km^{2} (5.21/sq mi)
- Time zone: UTC+1 (GMT +1)

Vindza or Vinza is a district in Djoué-Léfini Department in the Republic of the Congo.
