= Gamboma District =

Gamboma
- District
- Interactive map of Gamboma
- Coordinates: 1.87°S 15.87°E
- Country: Republic of the Congo
- Department: Nkéni-Alima

Area
  - Total: 6,477 km^{2} (2,501 sq mi)

Population (2023 census)
  - Total: 76,073
  - Density: 11.75/km^{2} (30.42/sq mi)
- Time zone: UTC+1 (GMT +1)

Gamboma is a district in the department of Nkéni-Alima of eastern Republic of the Congo. The capital lies at Gamboma, which is also the capital of Nkéni-Alima.
