= Etoumbi District =

Etoumbi
- District
- Interactive map of Etoumbi
- Country: Republic of the Congo
- Region: Cuvette-Ouest Department

Area
  - Total: 949 sq mi (2,459 km^{2})

Population (2023 census)
  - Total: 18,748
  - Density: 19.75/sq mi (7.624/km^{2})
- Time zone: UTC+1 (GMT +1)

Etoumbi is a district in the Cuvette-Ouest Department of Republic of the Congo.
