= Lycée Français Charlemagne =

Coordinates: 4.8007°S 11.8445°E

Location
- Pointe-Noire; Republic of the Congo

Information
- School type: International School
- Language: French
- Website: https://www.lycee-charlemagne-pnr.com/

Lycée Français Charlemagne is a French international school in Pointe-Noire, Republic of the Congo. It serves levels maternelle (preschool) through lycée (senior high school).
