= Nkéni-Alima Department =

Department of the Republic of the Congo

Nkéni-Alima
- Department
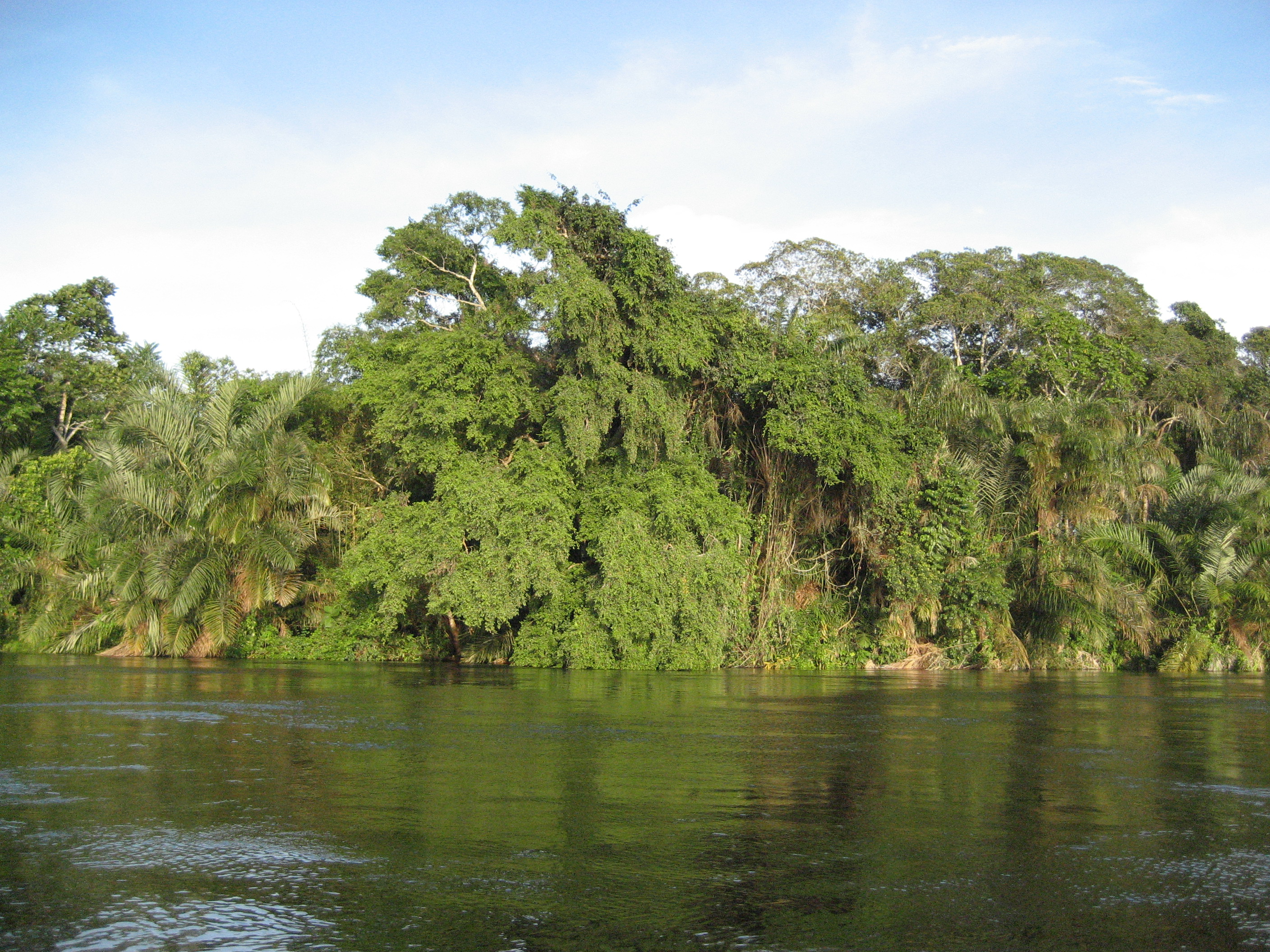
- The Alima River
- Interactive map of Nkéni-Alima
- Coordinates: 2°S 16°E
- Country: Republic of the Congo
- Established: 8 October 2024
- Capital: Gamboma

Government
  - Prefect: Alphonsine Akobé Opangana

Area (Note: Calculated by summing the areas of the districts of Abala, Allembé, Gamboma, Makotimpoto, Ollombo, and Ongogni as determined by geospatial data.)
  - Total: 17,407 km^{2} (6,721 sq mi)

Population (May 2023) (Note: Calculated by summing the populations of the districts of Abala, Allembé, Gamboma, Makotimpoko, Ollombo, and Ongogni as of the 2023 Congolese census.)
  - Total: 181,084
  - Density: 10.403/km^{2} (26.943/sq mi)
- Time zone: UTC+1 (WAT)

Nkéni-Alima is a department of the Republic of the Congo. It was created on 8 October 2024 from the northern part of Plateaux Department. Its capital is Gamboma. It is named after the Nkéni and Alima rivers.

== Geography and climate ==
Nkéni-Alima borders the departments of Congo-Oubangui to the northeast, Cuvette to the north, Cuvette-Ouest to the northwest, and Plateaux Department to the south. Its eastern border is the Congo River: on the other side of the river are the provinces of Maï-Ndombe and Équateur of the Democratic Republic of the Congo.

Nkéni-Alima is located in the central part of the Republic of Congo, on a forested plain extending north of the Batéké Plateau. Lying in the Northwest Congolian lowland forests ecoregion, the department features a mosaic of gallery and swamp forests.

The eastern part of the department between the Alima and Ntsakosso rivers is designated as part of the Grands Affluents Ramsar site, which was grouped with Lake Tele in Likouala Department and Ngiri-Tumba-Maindombe in the Democratic Republic of the Congo as a transboundary Ramsar site in 2017, the largest such site in the world.

Nkéni-Alima experiences a tropical savanna climate with an average temperature of around 25 °C (77 °F). Annual rainfall ranges from 1,600 to 2,200 mm (63 to 87 in), and the dry season lasts about three to four months between June and September.

== History ==
The Teke people are believed to be the first inhabitants of the region, establishing an independent principality at Etan, now Mbaya in Gamboma District. In the 15th century, the Bobangi and Mbochi peoples entered the area from the east, fleeing conflicts with the Fang.

Ethnic conflicts in the Democratic Republic of the Congo continue to cause displacement of refugees into the area such as at Makotimpoko and Gamboma, most recently in December 2018 and February 2025.

On 8 October 2024, Congo's National Assembly approved the creation of three new departments: Congo-Oubangui, Djoué-Léfini, and Nkéni-Alima.

== Administration ==
Nkéni-Alima is divided into the six districts of Abala, Allembé, Gamboma, Makotimpoko, Ollombo, and Ongogni. The districts of Abala, Gamboma, Ollombo and Ongogni each contain an urban community (communauté urbaine) of the same name.

The first prefect of Nkéni-Alima is Alphonsine Akobé Opangana, who was appointed in April 2025.

== Demographics ==
The six districts that now make up Nkéni-Alima reported a combined population of 181,084 in the 2023 Congolese census. The most populous settlements in the department as of the 2023 census are Gamboma (23,421), Makotimpoko (16,328) and Ollombo (11,878).

== Economy and infrastructure ==
Agriculture is the predominant economic activity in Nkéni-Alima, the main crops being manioc, yams, maize and fruit.

The paved N2 road, which links Brazzaville with the north of the country, runs through Gamboma and Ollombo. There are airports at Gamboma and Ollombo.
