= Lina Congo =

Airline of the Republic of the Congo

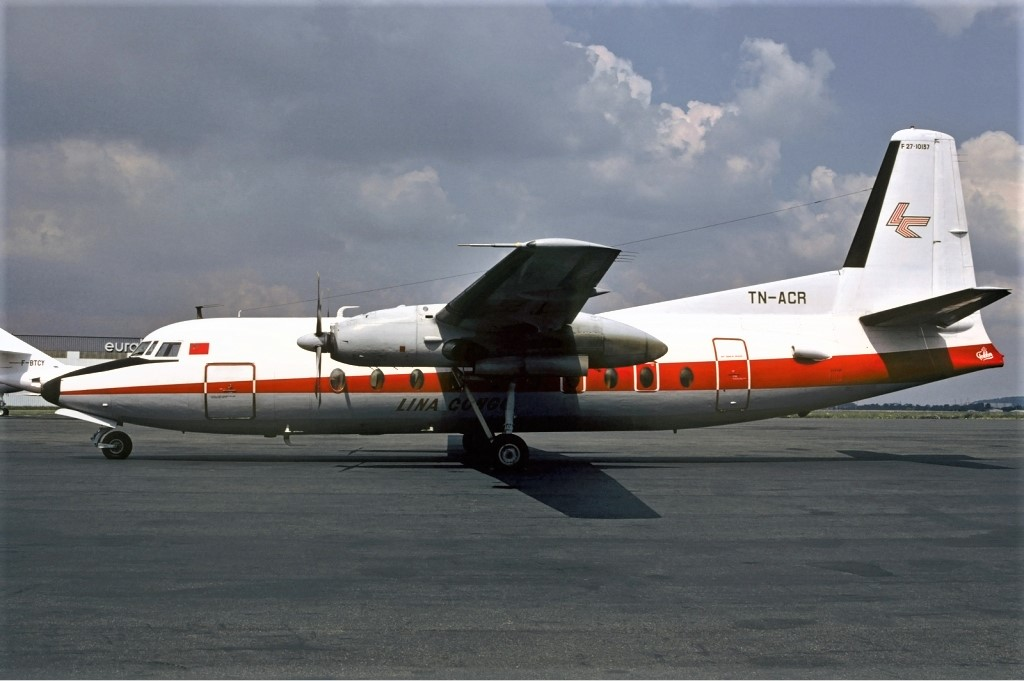
IATA	ICAO	Call sign
GC	GBC	LINACONGO
- Founded: 1961
- Ceased operations: 2002
- Operating bases: Maya-Maya Airport
- Fleet size: 1
- Parent company: Republic of the Congo
- Headquarters: Brazzaville, Republic of the Congo

Lignes Nationales Aériennes Congolaises, also known as Lina Congo, was the national airline of the Republic of Congo before ECAir in 2010.

== History ==
Air Congo (Compagnie Congolaise de Transports Aériéns) was founded in 1961 by private investors to operate charter and feeder flights in French Equatorial Africa with Douglas DC-3s and Douglas DC-4s. Based in Pointe-Noire, in 1963 the airline saw a route expansion after taking over numerous routes which were previously operated by Air Afrique. The route network linked Brazzaville and Pointe-Noire with Moanda in Gabon. On 16 March 1964, the airline was recapitalised and reformed, and the name was changed to Air Congo (Brazzaville). In August 1965, the airline was renamed Lina Congo in an attempt to lessen confusion with it and the airline of the same name from Zaire. By this time, the airline was 66% owned by the Congolese government.

The fleet of the airline in the early 1970s comprised one Douglas DC-4, two Douglas DC-3s, one Fokker F27 and two light aircraft, and the route network took in Brazzaville, Fort Rousset, Dolisie, Impfondo, Jacob, Makabana, Makoua, Moanda, Ouesso and Pointe-Noire. In 1974, Canada announced a C$5.7 million aid program for Congo-Brazzaville to develop civil aviation in the country.

The program which was made up of $4,904,000 in grants, and a $880,000 loan, allowed for the overhaul of Lina Congo, in addition to infrastructure in the country. By the late 1970s, two Canadian built de Havilland DHC-6 Twin Otters had joined the fleet, and the rest of the fleet comprised one DC-3, one Nord 262, two Antonov An-24s and two Fokker F27s. In addition a single Douglas DC-6 was leased from the Canadian International Development Company.

On 12 March 1992, a Twin Otter of the airline crashed during a thunderstorm near Etsouali during a flight from Maya Maya Airport in Brazzaville. The crash killed three crew members, but the five passengers survived.

In 2002, the airline was dissolved by the Congolese government after sustaining heavy losses and continuing to be a drain on government coffers.

== Fleet ==
As of August 2006 the Lina Congo fleet included:

- 1 De Havilland Canada DHC-6 Twin Otter Series 300

=== Historic fleet ===
The airline included the following aircraft

- DC 4
- DC 6
- DC 3
- F 27
- F 28
- 737-200
- N 262
- IL 76
- AN 24
