= Ewo District =

Ewo
- District
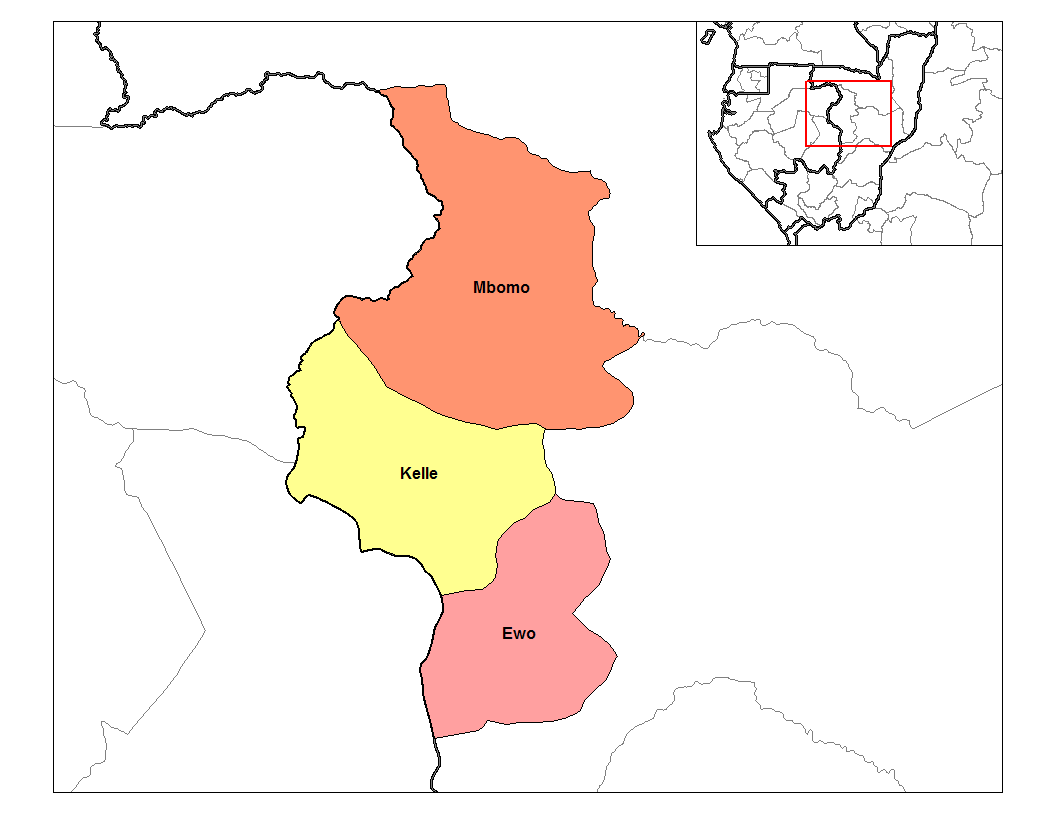
- Ewo District in the region

- Location within Republic of the Congo
- Country: Republic of the Congo
- Region: Cuvette-Ouest Region

Area
  - Total: 1,379 sq mi (3,571 km^{2})

Population (2023 census)
  - Total: 42,975
  - Density: 31.17/sq mi (12.03/km^{2})
- Time zone: UTC+1 (GMT +1)

Ewo is a district in the Cuvette-Ouest Region of western Republic of the Congo. The capital lies at Ewo.
