= Djambala Airport =

- IATA: DJM; ICAO: FCBD

Summary
- Airport type: Public
- Serves: Djambala, Republic of the Congo
- Elevation AMSL: 2,595 ft / 791 m
- Coordinates: 2°31′10″S 14°45′10″E

Map
- Location of airport in the Republic of the Congo

Runways
Direction	Length		Surface
Direction	m	ft	Surface
04/22	2,050	6,726	Asphalt
- Source: GCM Google Maps

Djambala Airport (IATA: DJM, ICAO: FCBD) is an airport serving Djambala, a city in the Plateaux Department of Republic of the Congo.

== See also ==
- List of airports in the Republic of the Congo
- Transport in the Republic of the Congo
