= Lekana =

- Location in the Republic of the Congo
- Coordinates: 2°19′27″S 14°35′26″E
- Country: Republic of the Congo
- Department: Plateaux
- District: Lekana

Population (2023)
  - Total: 4,707

Lekana is a village and the seat of Lekana District in the Plateaux Department of central Republic of the Congo.

It is served by Lekana Airport.
