= Abala District =

Abala
- District
- Interactive map of Abala
- Coordinates: 1°19′48.9″S 15°31′10.4″E
- Country: Republic of the Congo
- Department: Nkéni-Alima

Area
  - Total: 4,038 km^{2} (1,559 sq mi)

Population (2023 census)
  - Total: 13,326
  - Density: 3.300/km^{2} (8.547/sq mi)
- Time zone: UTC+1 (GMT +1)

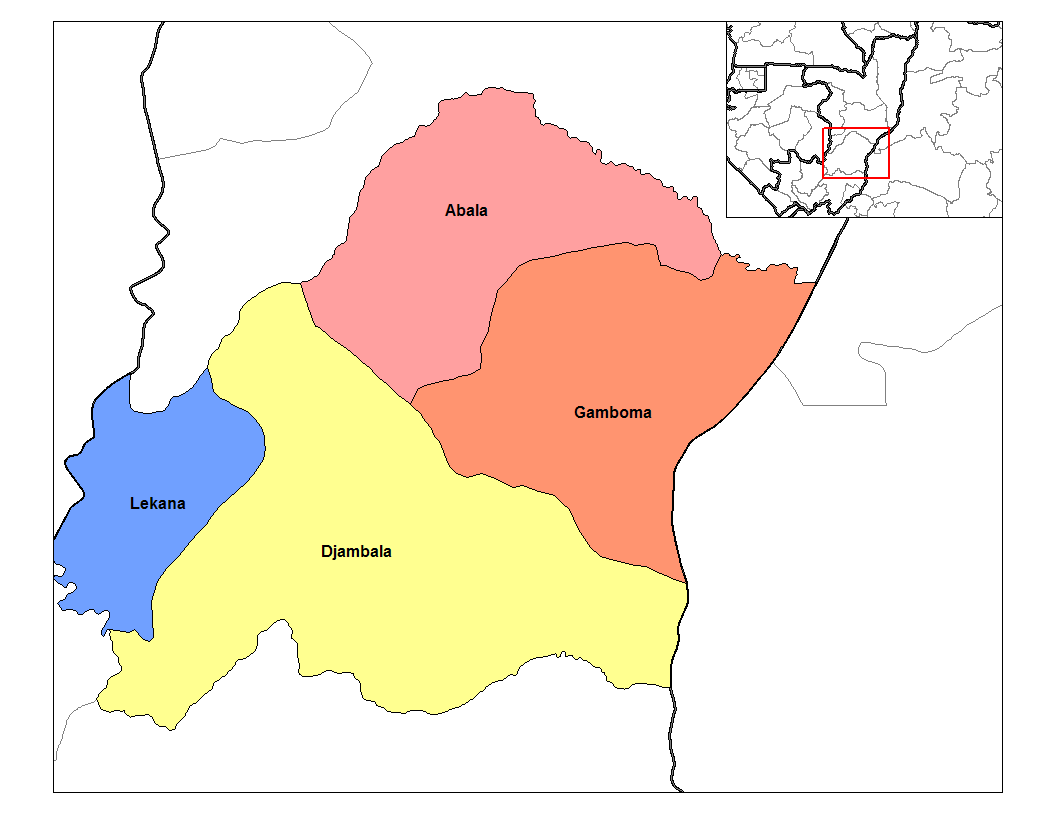
Map of the districts of Plateaux region in the Republic of the Congo.

Abala is a district in the department of Nkéni-Alima of central Republic of the Congo. The capital lies at Abala.
