= Ignié District =

Coordinates: 3.34667°S 15.48833°E

Ignié
- District
- Interactive map of Ignié
- Country: Republic of the Congo
- Department: Djoué-Léfini

Area
  - Total: 4,035 km^{2} (1,558 sq mi)

Population (2023 census)
  - Total: 108,294
  - Density: 26.84/km^{2} (69.51/sq mi)
- Time zone: UTC+1 (GMT +1)

Ignié is a district in the Djoué-Léfini Department of the Republic of the Congo.
