= Bouansa =

- Location in the Republic of the Congo
- Coordinates: 4°13′4″S 13°45′46″E
- Country: Republic of the Congo
- Department: Bouenza Department
- District: Madingou District
- Elevation: 241 m (791 ft)

Population (2023 census)
  - Total: 26,265

Bouansa (can also be written as Buansa or Bwansa) is a small town in southeastern Republic of the Congo with a population of 19,064 in 2007 census and 26,265 in 2023 census.
