= Ngo District =

Ngo
- District
- Interactive map of Ngo
- Coordinates: 2°29′5″S 15°44′49″E
- Country: Republic of the Congo
- Department: Plateaux Department

Area
  - Total: 2,720 sq mi (7,045 km^{2})

Population (2023 census)
  - Total: 34,183
  - Density: 12.57/sq mi (4.852/km^{2})
- Time zone: UTC+1 (GMT +1)

Ngo is a district in the Plateaux Department of Republic of the Congo.

The seat of this district is located at the town Ngo.
