= Ongogni District =

Ongogni Ongoni
- District
- Interactive map of Ongogni
- Coordinates: 1.6°S 16°E
- Country: Republic of the Congo
- Department: Nkéni-Alima

Area
  - Total: 456.5 km^{2} (176.3 sq mi)

Population (2023 census)
  - Total: 17,381
  - Density: 38.07/km^{2} (98.61/sq mi)
- Time zone: UTC+1 (GMT +1)

Ongogni or Ongoni is a district in the Nkéni-Alima of the Republic of the Congo.
