= Lesio Louna Reserve =

The Lesio-Louna Reserve is found in the Republic of the Congo. It was established on 28 December 1993. This site is 440.00 km^{2}.

Lesio Louna Reserve is located north of Brazzaville and is dedicated to the protection of Gorillas.

By presidential decree in 1999, it received the status of a natural reserve.
