= Kellé =

- Location in the Republic of the Congo
- Coordinates: 0°3′39″S 14°29′16″E
- Country: Republic of the Congo
- Department: Cuvette-Ouest
- District: Kellé

Population (2023 census)
  - Total: 4,541

Kellé is a village and the seat of Kelle District in the Cuvette-Ouest Department of central Republic of the Congo.

The city is served by Kelle Airport.
