= Allembé District =

Allembé
- District
- Location within Republic of the Congo
- Coordinates: 1.1392°S 15.3333°E
- Country: Republic of the Congo
- Department: Nkéni-Alima

Area
  - Total: 2,055 km^{2} (793 sq mi)

Population (2023 census)
  - Total: 6,208
  - Density: 3.021/km^{2} (7.824/sq mi)
- Time zone: UTC+1 (GMT +1)

Allembé is a district in the department of Nkéni-Alima of the Republic of the Congo.
