= Djambala =

- Location in the Republic of the Congo
- Coordinates: 2°32′24″S 14°45′7″E
- Country: Republic of the Congo
- Department: Plateaux Department
- District: Djambala District
- Commune: Djambala
- Elevation: 622 m (2,041 ft)

Population (2023 census)
  - Total: 24,734

Djambala is a town and a commune, administrative center of Djambala District and of Plateaux Department in the Republic of Congo. Located near the Léfini Faunal Reserve, Djambala had a population of 24,734 in 2023, the date of the country's last official census.

== Climate ==
Djambala has a tropical monsoon climate (Am), bordering on a tropical savanna climate (Köppen Aw). It features a short dry season from June to August due to the influence of the Benguela Current reaching furthest north, and a lengthy wet season for the remaining nine months of the year. Although temperatures are somewhat reduced by the city’s moderately high altitude, conditions are very warm and humid throughout the year even in the dry season.

Climate data for Djambala (1951-1960, extremes 1941-present)
Month	Jan	Feb	Mar	Apr	May	Jun	Jul	Aug	Sep	Oct	Nov	Dec	Year
Record high °C (°F)	31.5 (88.7)	32.7 (90.9)	34.0 (93.2)	35.0 (95.0)	39.6 (103.3)	30.8 (87.4)	37.2 (99.0)	35.4 (95.7)	33.6 (92.5)	35.0 (95.0)	37.1 (98.8)	31.5 (88.7)	39.6 (103.3)
Mean daily maximum °C (°F)	27.6 (81.7)	27.8 (82.0)	28.4 (83.1)	28.5 (83.3)	27.6 (81.7)	26.9 (80.4)	26.2 (79.2)	27.0 (80.6)	27.0 (80.6)	26.6 (79.9)	27.1 (80.8)	27.1 (80.8)	27.3 (81.1)
Daily mean °C (°F)	23.2 (73.8)	23.5 (74.3)	23.7 (74.7)	23.8 (74.8)	23.6 (74.5)	22.5 (72.5)	21.7 (71.1)	22.1 (71.8)	22.5 (72.5)	22.8 (73.0)	22.7 (72.9)	22.9 (73.2)	22.9 (73.2)
Mean daily minimum °C (°F)	19.2 (66.6)	19.2 (66.6)	19.3 (66.7)	19.6 (67.3)	19.5 (67.1)	17.9 (64.2)	16.8 (62.2)	17.0 (62.6)	18.3 (64.9)	18.9 (66.0)	19.0 (66.2)	19.1 (66.4)	18.6 (65.5)
Record low °C (°F)	15.0 (59.0)	12.8 (55.0)	14.9 (58.8)	16.0 (60.8)	15.3 (59.5)	12.5 (54.5)	12.1 (53.8)	12.6 (54.7)	15.1 (59.2)	15.4 (59.7)	14.0 (57.2)	12.8 (55.0)	12.1 (53.8)
Average precipitation mm (inches)	127.4 (5.02)	152.5 (6.00)	172.3 (6.78)	166.3 (6.55)	144.4 (5.69)	60.0 (2.36)	30.2 (1.19)	43.7 (1.72)	136.5 (5.37)	233.1 (9.18)	193.9 (7.63)	166.6 (6.56)	1,626.9 (64.05)
Average precipitation days (≥ 0.1 mm)	17	15	19	19	15	3	1	4	11	20	21	19	164
Average relative humidity (%)	80	83	83	83	84	82	80	76	80	85	86	86	82
Mean monthly sunshine hours	151.9	146.9	158.1	156.0	167.4	168.0	158.1	151.9	129.0	130.2	129.0	139.5	1,786
Percentage possible sunshine	40	43	42	44	45	47	43	41	36	35	35	37	41
Source 1: NOAA (mean temperature, precipitation 1991-2020), Deutscher Wetterdienst (precipitation days 1950-1970, humidity 1952-1967, and sunshine 1965-1990)
Source 2: Meteo Climat (extremes)

== Transport ==
In April 2007, a deal was signed with a Korean consortium to build a railway mainly for timber traffic from the main port to Djambala.

Djambala is also served by Djambala Airport.

== See also ==
- Railway stations in Congo
