= Makotimpoko District =

Makotimpoko Makotipoko
- District
- Interactive map of Makotimpoko
- Coordinates: 2°S 16.3°E
- Country: Republic of the Congo
- Department: Nkéni-Alima

Area
  - Total: 2,034 km^{2} (785 sq mi)

Population (2023 census)
  - Total: 41,242
  - Density: 20.28/km^{2} (52.52/sq mi)
- Time zone: UTC+1 (GMT +1)

Makotimpoko or Makotipoko is a district in the department of Nkéni-Alima of the Republic of the Congo.
