= Ewo, Republic of the Congo =

Ewo
- Location in the Republic of the Congo
- Coordinates: 0°52′27″S 14°49′0″E
- Country: Republic of the Congo
- Department: Cuvette-Ouest Department
- District: Ewo District
- Commune: Ewo
- Elevation: 534 m (1,752 ft)

Population (2023 census)
  - Total: 28,229

Ewo is a village and a commune located in the Republic of the Congo that serves as the administrative center of Ewo District and the Cuvette-Ouest department. Situated on the banks of the Kouyou River, Ewo had a population of 28,229 inhabitants in 2023, the date of the country's last official census. It is served by Ewo Airport.
