= Ollombo District =

Ollombo
- District
- Interactive map of Ollombo
- Coordinates: 1°16′12″S 15°53′47″E
- Country: Republic of the Congo
- Department: Nkéni-Alima

Area
  - Total: 2,346 km^{2} (906 sq mi)

Population (2023 census)
  - Total: 26,854
  - Density: 11.45/km^{2} (29.65/sq mi)
- Time zone: UTC+1 (GMT +1)

Ollombo is a district in the department of Nkéni-Alima of the Republic of the Congo.
