= Plateaux Department (Republic of the Congo) =

Department of the Republic of the Congo

Coordinates: 1.93674°S 15.35948°E

Plateaux
- Department
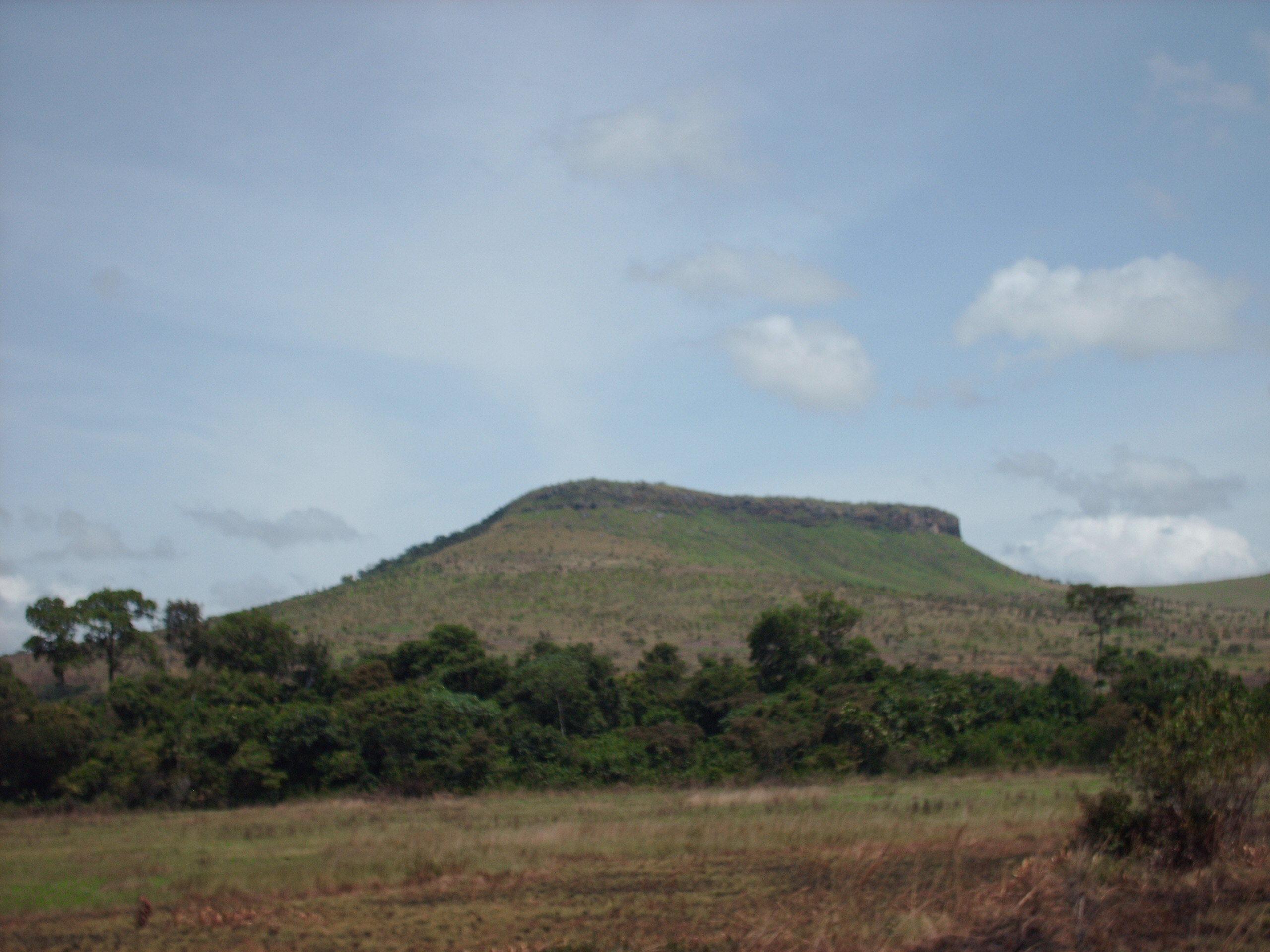

- Plateaux, department of the Republic of the Congo
- Country: Republic of the Congo
- Capital: Djambala

Area
  - Total: 38,400 km^{2} (14,800 sq mi)

Population (2023 census)
  - Total: 283,421
  - Density: 7.38/km^{2} (19.1/sq mi)
- HDI (2018): 0.542 low · 5th of 12

Plateaux is a department of the Republic of the Congo in the central part of the country. It borders the departments of Cuvette, Cuvette Ouest, Lékoumou and Pool, and internationally, the Democratic Republic of the Congo on the east and Gabon on the west. The regional capital is Djambala. Principal cities and towns include Gamboma and Lekana.

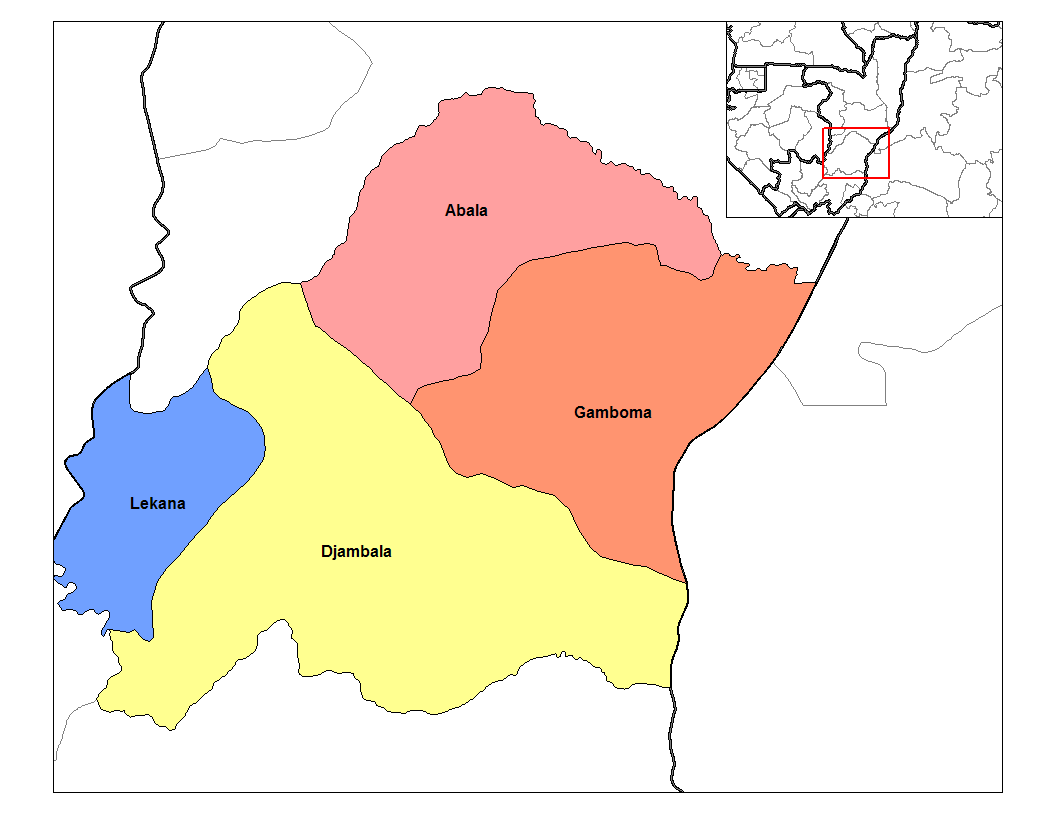
Districts of Plateaux

== Administrative divisions ==
Plateaux Department is divided into eleven districts:

=== Districts ===
1. Djambala District
2. Lekana District
3. Gamboma District
4. Abala District
5. Allembé District
6. Makotimpoko District
7. Mbon District
8. Mpouya District
9. Ngo District
10. Ollombo District
11. Ongogni District
