= Gamboma =

- Location in the Republic of the Congo
- Coordinates: 1°52′16″S 15°52′41″E
- Country: Republic of the Congo
- Department: Nkéni-Alima
- District: Gamboma
- Elevation: 354 m (1,161 ft)

Population (2023 census)
  - Total: 52,652

Gamboma is the largest city and the capital of Nkéni-Alima Department in the Republic of the Congo. It is served by Gamboma Airport.

== Climate ==
Gamboma has a tropical savanna climate (Aw) according to the Köppen climate classification.

Climate data for Gamboma (1991-2020)
Month	Jan	Feb	Mar	Apr	May	Jun	Jul	Aug	Sep	Oct	Nov	Dec	Year
Mean daily maximum °C (°F)	31.6 (88.9)	32.1 (89.8)	32.6 (90.7)	32.6 (90.7)	32.1 (89.8)	31.4 (88.5)	30.8 (87.4)	31.5 (88.7)	31.5 (88.7)	31.1 (88.0)	31.2 (88.2)	31.0 (87.8)	31.6 (88.9)
Average precipitation mm (inches)	174.0 (6.85)	179.8 (7.08)	216.3 (8.52)	241.8 (9.52)	184.1 (7.25)	43.6 (1.72)	14.0 (0.55)	30.8 (1.21)	109.8 (4.32)	212.4 (8.36)	299.1 (11.78)	214.2 (8.43)	1,919.9 (75.59)
Source: NOAA
