= Cuvette-Ouest Department =

Department of the Republic of the Congo

Coordinates: 0.866667°S 14.8167°E

Cuvette-Ouest
- Department
- Cuvette-Ouest, department of the Republic of the Congo
- Country: Republic of the Congo
- Capital: Ewo

Area
  - Total: 26,600 km^{2} (10,300 sq mi)

Population (2023 census)
  - Total: 119,328
  - Density: 4.49/km^{2} (11.6/sq mi)
- HDI (2018): 0.514 low · 9th of 12

Cuvette-Ouest ("West Cuvette") is a department of the Republic of the Congo in the western part of the country. Cuvette-Ouest is the least populated department in the country. From southeast to northeast it borders the departments of Plateaux, Nkéni-Alima, Cuvette, and Sangha, and it also borders the country of Gabon to the west. The capital is Ewo. Principal cities and towns include Kelle.

Cuvette-Ouest has been the site of several outbreaks of the Ebola virus.

== Administrative divisions ==
Cuvette-Ouest Department is divided into one commune and six districts:

=== Districts ===
1. Ewo District
2. Kelle District
3. Mbomo District
4. Okoyo District
5. Etoumbi District
6. Mbama District

=== Communes ===
1. Ewo Commune
