= N2 road (Republic of the Congo) =

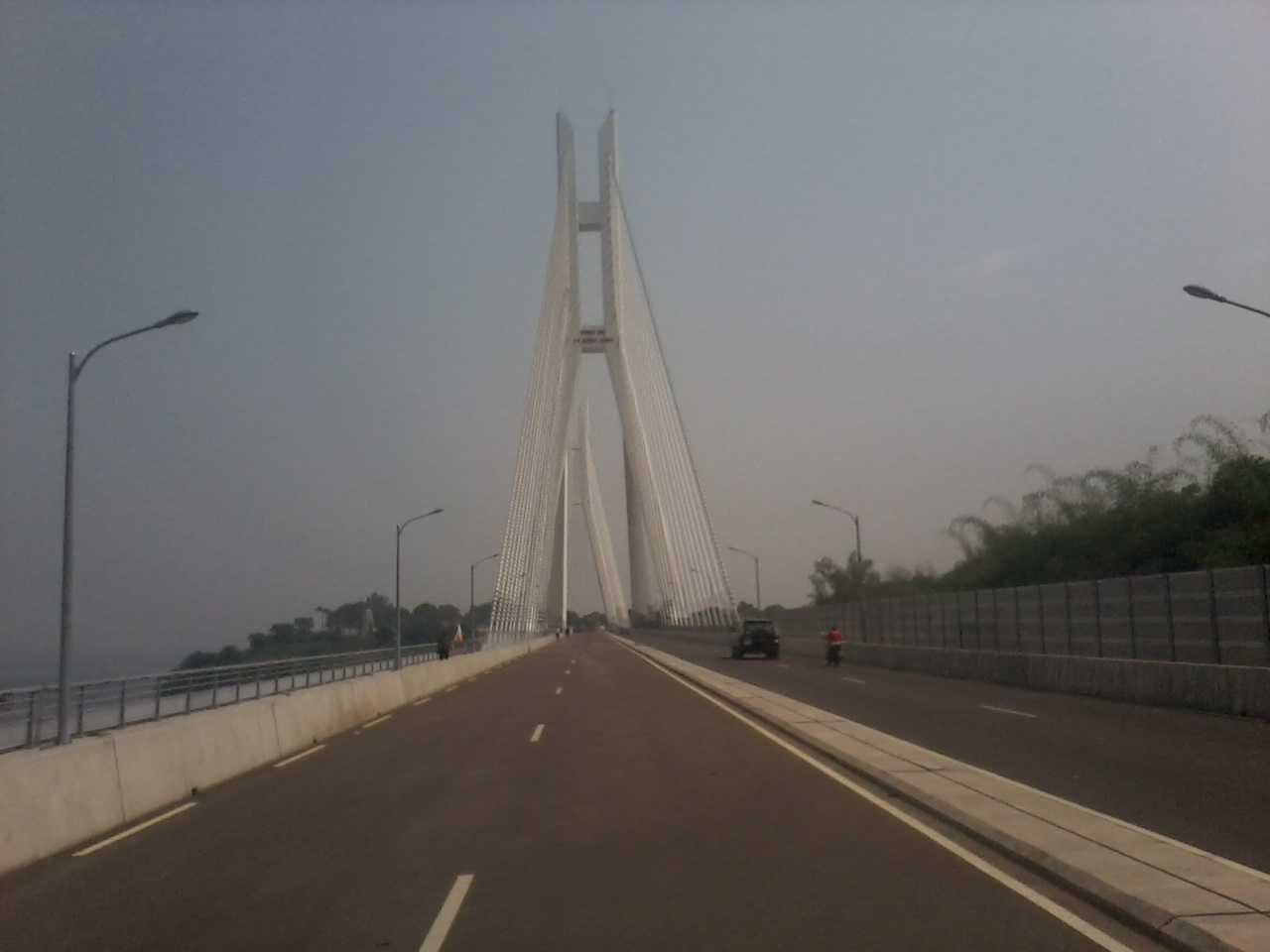

Location
- Country: Republic of the Congo

Highway system
- Transport in the Republic of the Congo

The N2 road is one of the national highways of the Republic of the Congo. It is a south–north highway which connects the capital of Brazzaville with the northern border.
