= Pointe-Noire =

City, department and commune of the Republic of the Congo

Pointe-Noire Njinji (Kongo)
- Department
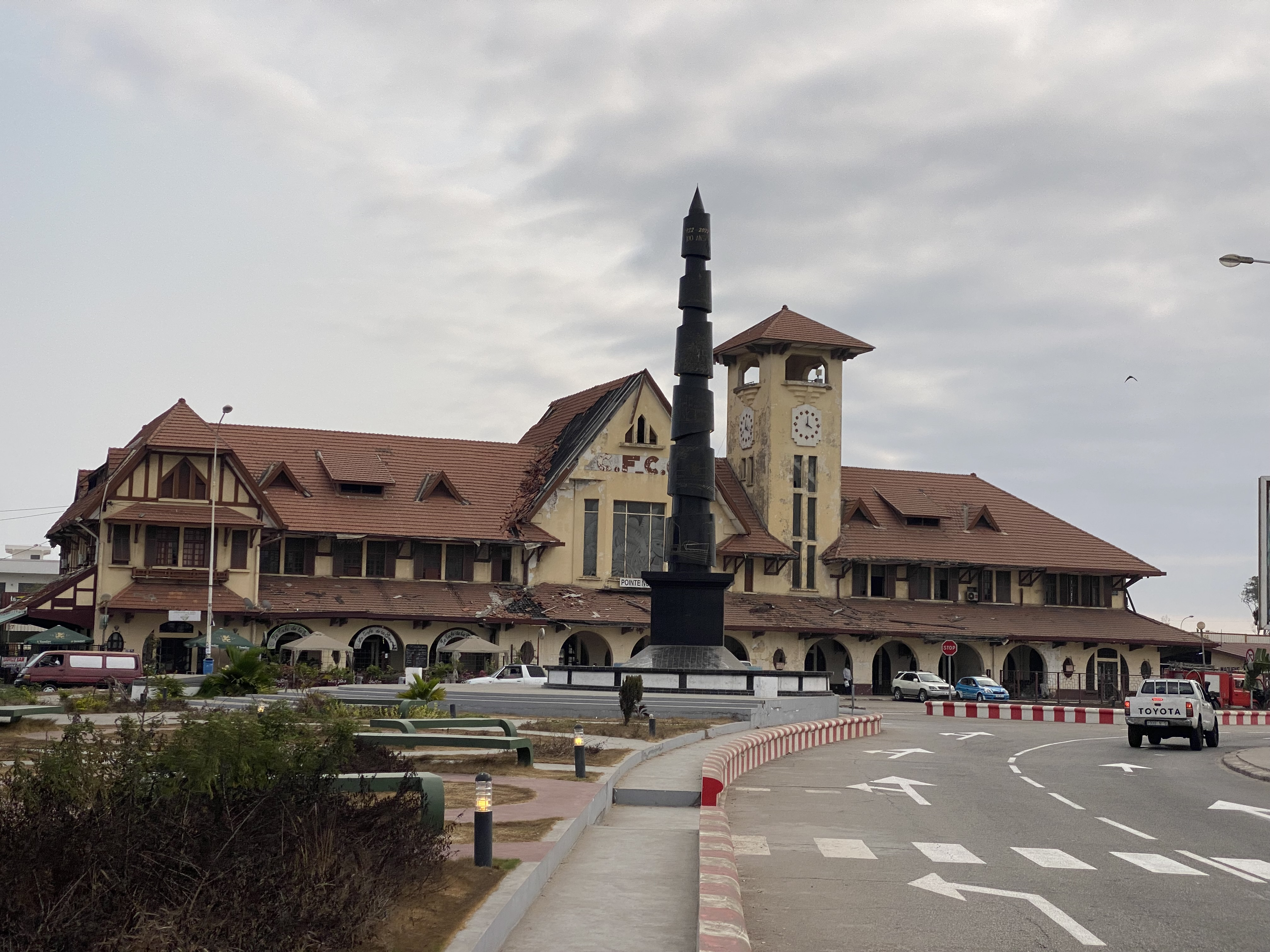
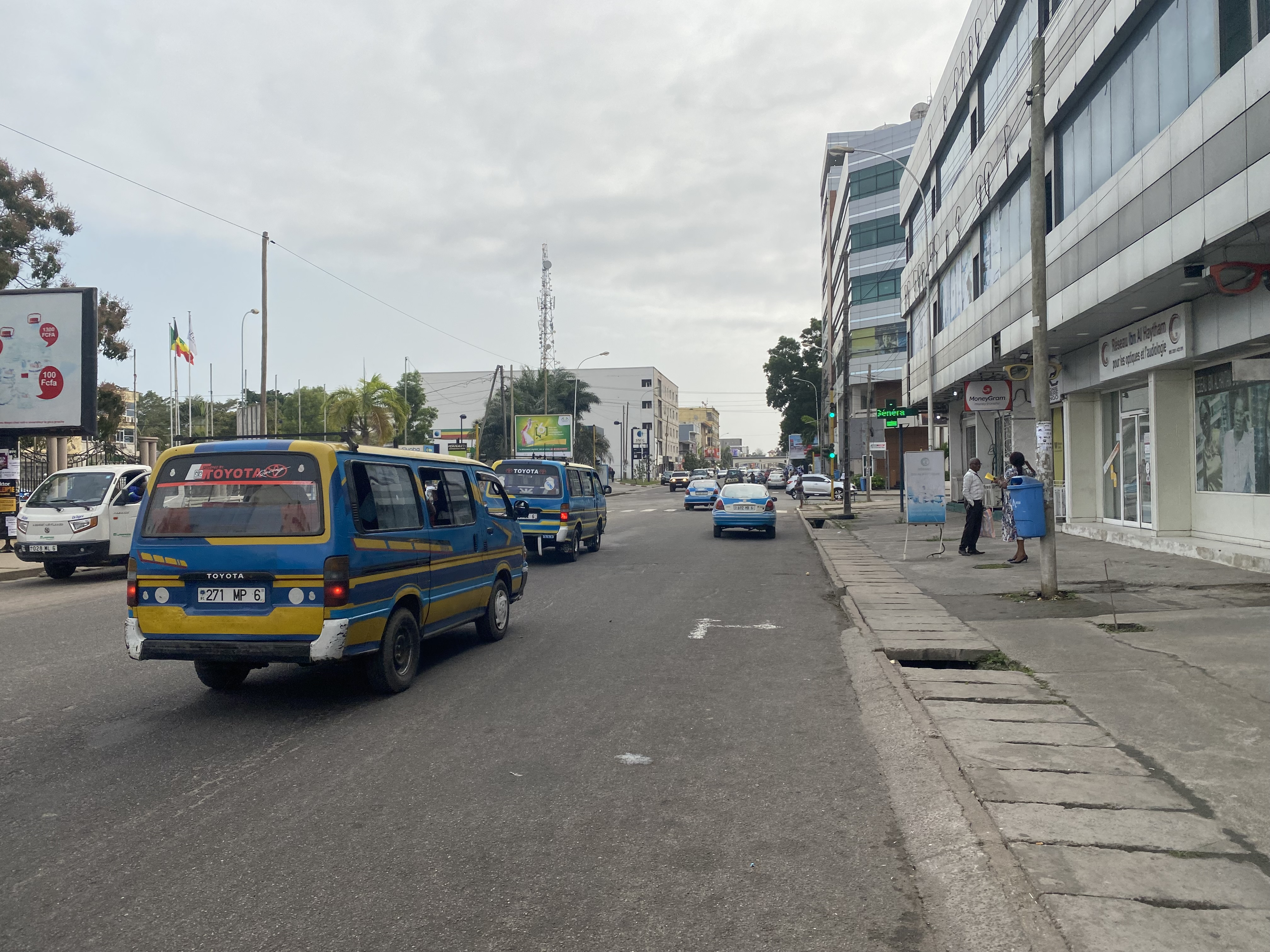
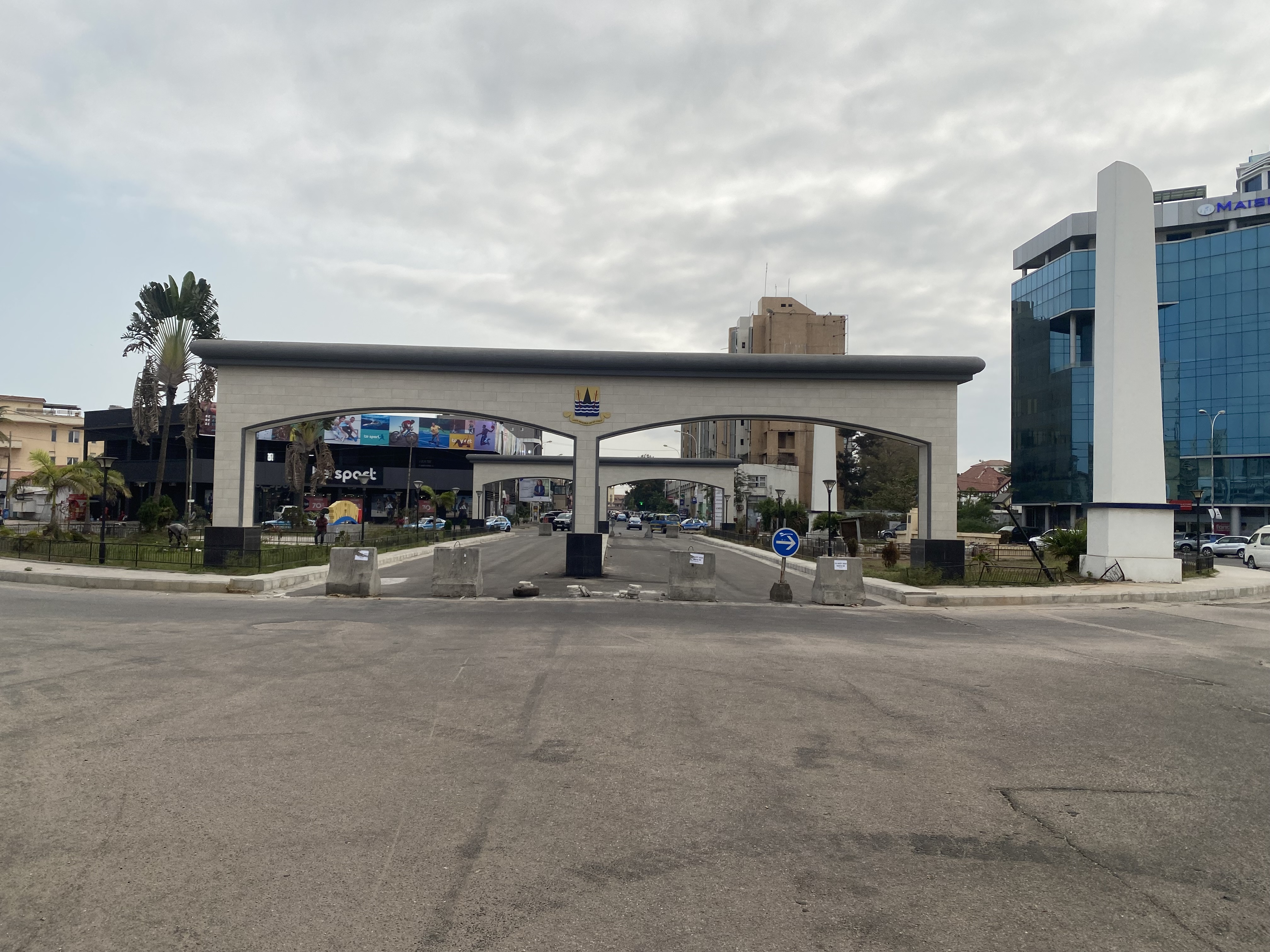

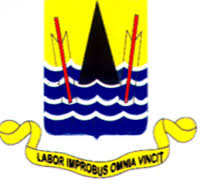
- Flag Coat of arms
- Motto: Labor improbus omnia vincit
- Interactive map of Pointe-Noire
- Location in the Republic of the Congo
- Coordinates: 04°47′51″S 11°51′1″E
- Country: Republic of the Congo
- Department: Pointe-Noire Department
- Commune: Pointe-Noire
- Founded: 1883

Government
  - Mayor: Jean-François Kando (PCT)

Area
  - Total: 2,134 km^{2} (824 sq mi)
- Elevation: 14 m (46 ft)

Population (2023 census)
  - Total: 1,420,612
  - Density: 665.7/km^{2} (1,724/sq mi)
  - Official language: French
  - National language: Kituba language

Ethnicities: mostly Bakongo, especially Bavili
- Area code: 242
- HDI (2023): 0.692 · medium · 2nd of 12

Pointe-Noire (French pronunciation: [pwɛ̃t.nwaʁ]; Kongo: Njinji, French: Ndjindji with the letter d following French spelling standards) is the second largest city and main economic centre in the Republic of the Congo, with a population of 1,420,612 inhabitants in 2023. Since the 2002 constitution, it has also been an autonomous department and a commune; before this date it was the capital of the Kouilou region (now a separate department). It is situated on a headland between Pointe-Noire Bay and the Atlantic Ocean and is located near the border with Angola.

The coat of arms of the city of Pointe-Noire can be described as, "Gold at the point of sand accompanied by two silver oars, the handle gules, laid in chevron poured, the tip and oars moving from a sea of azure wavy three streams of silver"

== Administration ==
Pointe-Noire is a commune divided into six urban boroughs (arrondissements):

- Lumumba, the oldest area, administrative and commercial centre
- Mvoumvou
- Tié-Tié
- Loandjili
- Mongo-Mpoukou
- Ngoyo

Pointe-Noire is also a department which includes the area of the commune and, since 2011, the district of Tchiamba-Nzassi, formerly part of the Kouilou department.

== History ==
Prior to European exploration, the place now called Pointe-Noire was a region around the fishing village of Ndji-Ndji. At the time, it was under the dominion of the Kingdom of Loango, being around 20 kilometres south of its capital Buali. The name Pointe-Noire ("Black Point") originated with Portuguese navigators who saw an outcropping of black rocks on the headland in 1484 near Ndji-Ndji. The land of the Loango kingdom was acquired by France on March 12, 1883 through a treaty negotiated between Lieutenant Cordier and the King of Loango (Mâ Loango) Manimacosso-Chicusso; Pointe-Noire was founded that year.

In 1910, French Equatorial Africa (Afrique équatoriale française, AEF) was created, and French companies were allowed to exploit the Middle Congo (modern-day Congo Brazzaville). In 1923, Pointe-Noire was chosen to be the terminus of the Congo-Ocean Railway, aiming to connect Brazzaville, the terminus of the river navigation on the Congo River and the Ubangui River, with the Atlantic coast. As rapids made it impossible to navigate on the Congo River past Brazzaville, and the coastal railroad terminus site had to allow for the construction of a deep-sea port, authorities chose the site of Pointe-Noire instead of Libreville as originally envisaged. The railway was completed in 1934.

In 1927, drinking water became available in the city, which had about 3,000 inhabitants. The city's first airport, Agostinho-Neto International Airport, finished construction in 1934. The first hospital was built in 1936. That same year, the Paris-based Banque de l'Afrique Occidentale opened its first branch in the city. In 1942, the Pointe-Noire Harbour welcomed its first ship, and made the city the AEF's seaport.

In 1950, Pointe-Noire had 20,000 inhabitants, and became the capital of the Middle Congo, while Brazzaville was the capital city of the AEF. In 1957, the Middle Congo became the Republic of Congo, although it was still not independent. Incidents which occurred during the 1958 legislative elections led the leaders of the Democratic Union for the Defence of African Interests (Union démocratique pour la défense des interets africains, UDDIA) to transfer the capital to Brazzaville, since Pointe-Noire was under the influence of the political opposition.

Pointe-Noire continued growing, and was the most modern city in 1960, when Congo gained independence. Growth accelerated following the discovery of oil around 1980, which attracted people and Elf-Aquitaine facilities. The population doubled by 1982, and reached 360,000 in 1994.

Civil wars in 1997 and 1999 caused an influx of refugees from the surrounding provinces (Lékoumou, Niari, Bouenza, Pool) towards Pointe-Noire, causing the population to climb to over 1 million inhabitants.

On 22 June 2010 a train departing from Pointe-Noire derailed, resulting in the deaths of many passengers.

Recently the Congolese government has proposed the development of a new bulk resource port to be constructed at Point Indienne, 30 kilometres (19 mi) to the north of the Port of Pointe-Noire. A meeting was held on 18 December 2012 with a collective of 10 Congo government ministries which invited mining companies to discuss future development opportunities.

== Economy ==
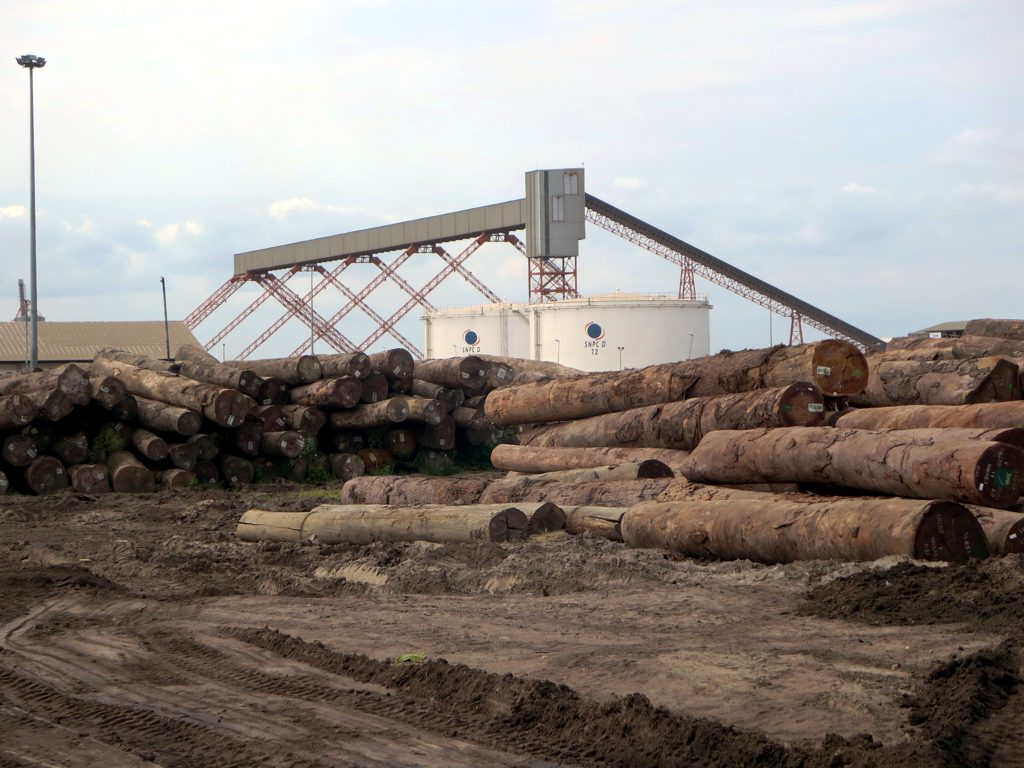
Timber for export at the Port of Pointe-Noire

Pointe-Noire is the essential centre of the oil industry of the Republic of Congo, one of the main oil producers in Central Africa. Congolese oil has been largely exploited by the French company Elf Aquitaine since its discovery around 1980.

Pointe-Noire is also known for its fishing industry, which is often at odds with the oil development. Local waters are reportedly getting overfished.

Formerly, Pointe-Noire was home to a potash exploitation which led to the construction of a wharf, currently closed to the public.

== Education ==
Pointe Noire hosts two international schools: Lycée Français Charlemagne, a French international school for primary and secondary school children, and Connie's Academy, a British international school for children aged 0 to 18 years.

=== Higher education ===
The city is home to the École Supérieure de Technologie du Littoral (technology), the École supérieure de commerce et de gestion (business), the Institut UCAC-ICAM (engineering) and the Centre d’éducation, de formation et d’apprentissage en mécanique auto (automotive engineering). The Higher Institute of Technology of Central Africa has a campus in the city. There are also several other institutions of higher education in the city.

As a result of the decentralisation policy put in place by the Congolese government, Pointe-Noire has seen the emergence of some private institutes and universities:

- The University of Loango offers programmes in law, management and commerce.
- The Ecole Africaine de Développement campus in Pointe Noire offers programmes in science and technology.
- The Ecole Superieure of Commerce and Industry of Congo offers bachelor's degree courses in partnership with Ecole SupdeV Paris.
- The Loango Institute of Advanced Technology is a research school offering bachelor's and master's degrees in fields of computer science.

== Transportation ==
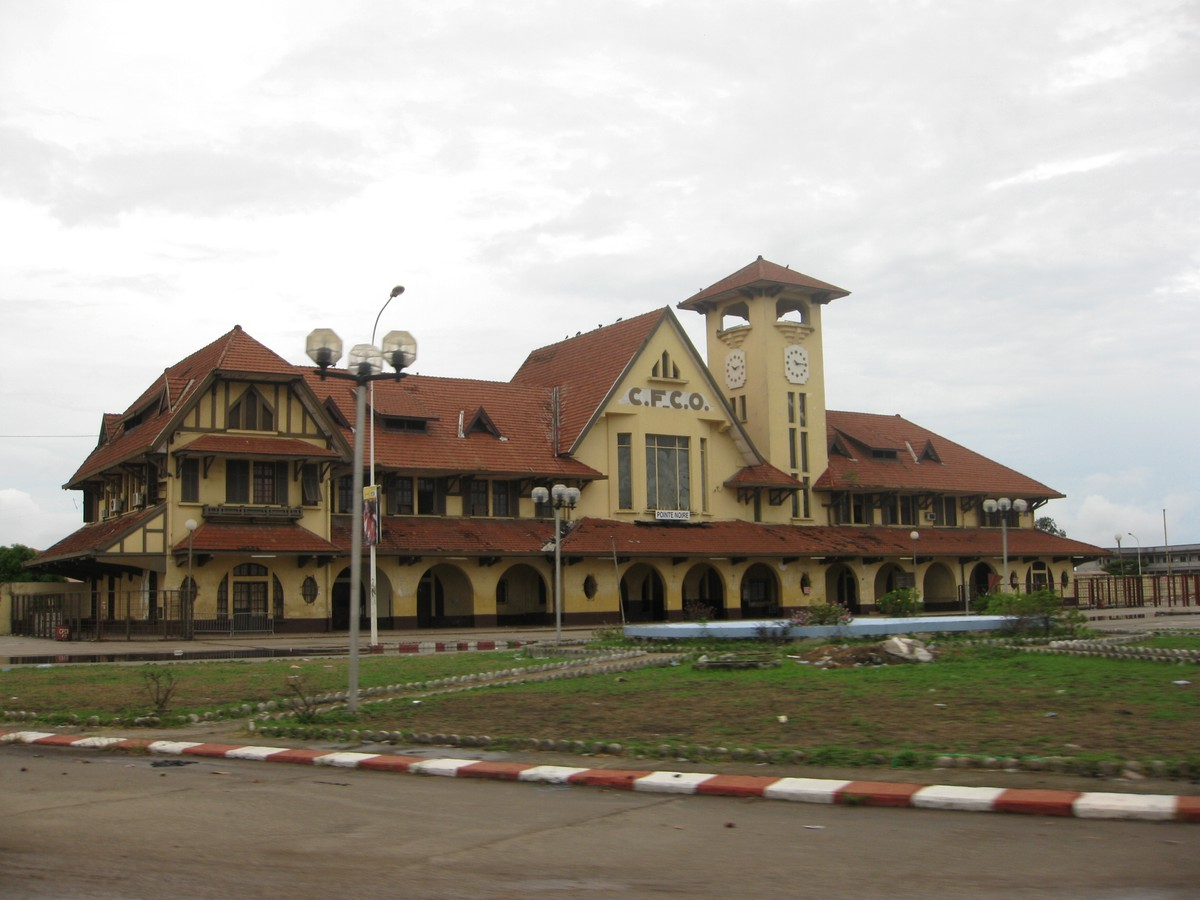
Pointe-Noire railway station

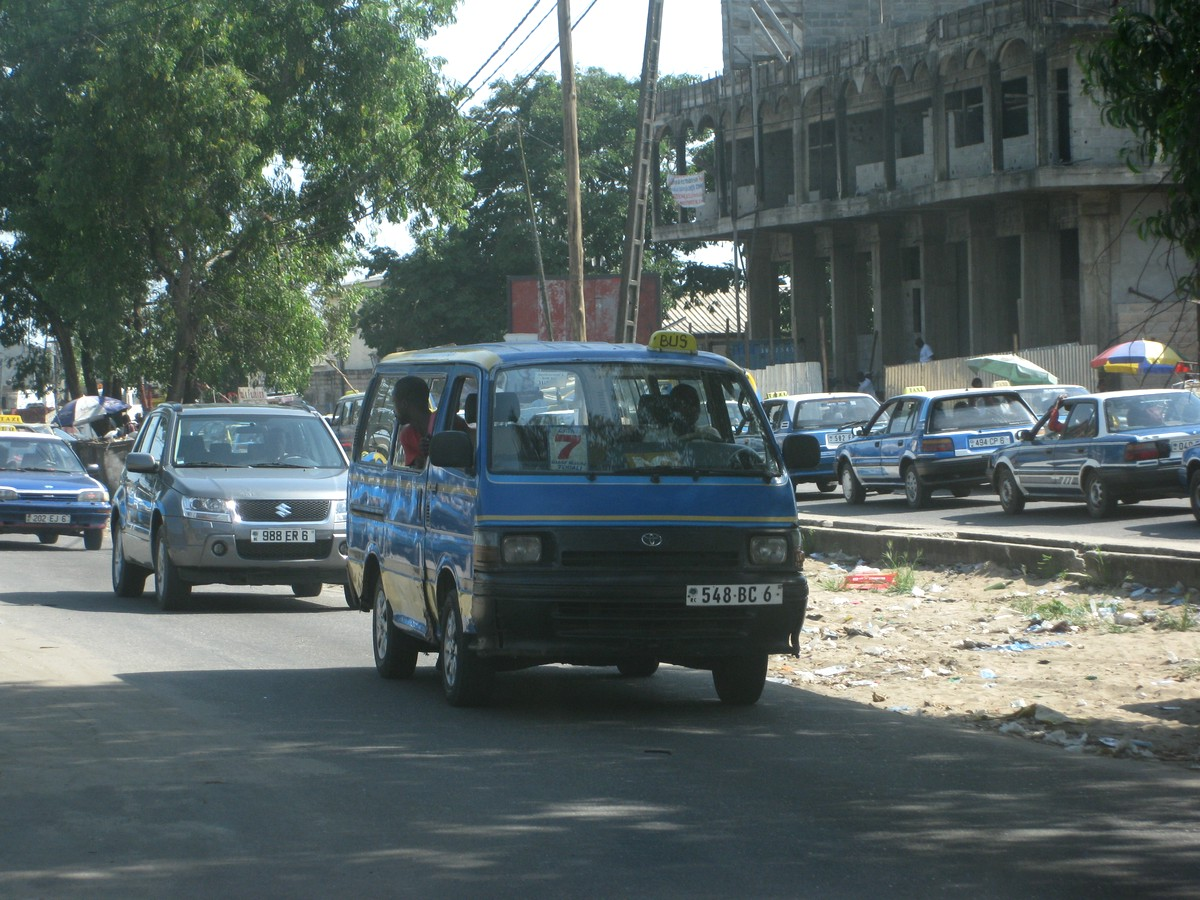
Public transport in Point-Noire

The port of Pointe-Noire functions under the auspices of Port Autonome de Pointe-Noire, and is a member port of the International Association of Ports and Harbors (IAPH).

Pointe-Noire is home to Agostinho-Neto International Airport which as of August 2023 had direct flights to Abidjan, Addis Ababa, Brazzaville, Cotonou, Douala, Istanbul, Libreville, Luanda and Paris and was the second busiest airport in the country.

Pointe-Noire is also the terminus of the Congo-Ocean Railway, the railway station being a notable building. As of 2014 the railway was operating the La Gazelle train service every other day to Brazzaville and intermediate destinations. The city also includes Tié-Tié Railway Station and Ngondji Railway Station, the next railway stations after the Pointe Noire terminus.

Pointe-Noire has a taxi-bus network that runs throughout the entire city.

== Places of worship ==
The places of worship in Pointe-Noire are predominantly Christian churches and temples: Roman Catholic Diocese of Pointe-Noire (Catholic Church), Evangelical Church of Congo (World Communion of Reformed Churches), and Assemblies of God.

== Climate ==
Pointe-Noire has a tropical savanna climate under the Köppen climate classification. The city has a wet season that spans from October through April, while the remaining 5 months form the dry season. Pointe-Noire receives roughly 1,000 millimetres (39 in) of precipitation annually. Temperatures are somewhat cooler during the dry season with average temperatures roughly at 24 degrees Celsius. During the wet season, average temperatures hover around 28 degrees Celsius.

Climate data for Pointe-Noire (1991-2020)
Month	Jan	Feb	Mar	Apr	May	Jun	Jul	Aug	Sep	Oct	Nov	Dec	Year
Mean daily maximum °C (°F)	30.3 (86.5)	31.0 (87.8)	31.4 (88.5)	31.1 (88.0)	29.7 (85.5)	27.4 (81.3)	26.0 (78.8)	26.1 (79.0)	27.1 (80.8)	28.7 (83.7)	29.5 (85.1)	29.7 (85.5)	29.0 (84.2)
Daily mean °C (°F)	26.9 (80.4)	27.3 (81.1)	27.6 (81.7)	27.3 (81.1)	26.4 (79.5)	24.1 (75.4)	22.5 (72.5)	22.7 (72.9)	24.1 (75.4)	25.8 (78.4)	26.4 (79.5)	26.5 (79.7)	25.6 (78.1)
Mean daily minimum °C (°F)	24.0 (75.2)	24.1 (75.4)	24.3 (75.7)	24.2 (75.6)	23.7 (74.7)	21.0 (69.8)	20.1 (68.2)	20.4 (68.7)	22.1 (71.8)	23.1 (73.6)	23.9 (75.0)	23.8 (74.8)	23.4 (74.1)
Average precipitation mm (inches)	180.3 (7.10)	225.4 (8.87)	193.4 (7.61)	134.1 (5.28)	55.5 (2.19)	2.2 (0.09)	1.0 (0.04)	4.2 (0.17)	16.7 (0.66)	104.5 (4.11)	201.6 (7.94)	185.5 (7.30)	1,304.4 (51.36)
Source: NOAA

== Sport ==
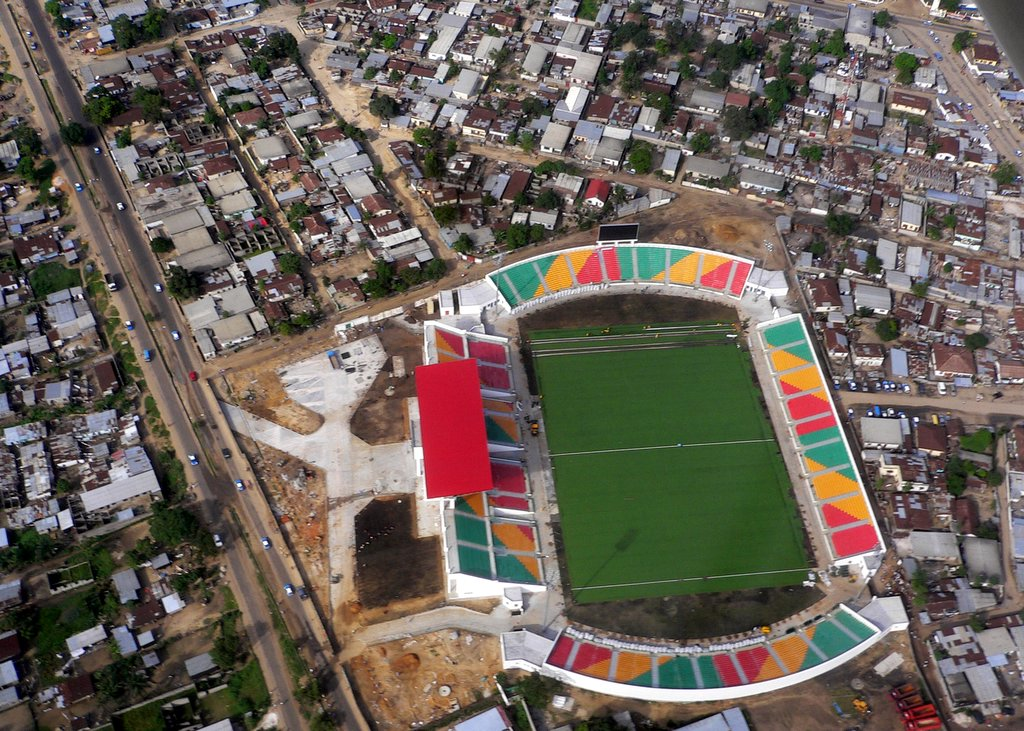
Stade Municipal (Pointe-Noire)

Football teams include Association Sportive des Cheminots and Jeunesse Sportive les Bougainvillées.

== Twin towns – sister cities ==
Pointe-Noire is twinned with:

- Dalian, China
- New Orleans, United States
- Suzhou, China

== Notable people ==
- Delvin N'Dinga, footballer
- Junior Etou (born 1994), Congolese basketball player for Hapoel Be'er Sheva of the Israeli Basketball Premier League
- Alain Mabanckou (born 1966), writer
- Sardoine Mia (born 1998), artist
- Ghislaine Sathoud, feminist writer
- Anatole Collinet Makosso (born 1965), prime minister since 2019

== See also ==
- Railway stations in Congo
