= Departments of the Republic of the Congo =

Departments of the Republic of the Congo Départements de la République du Congo (French)
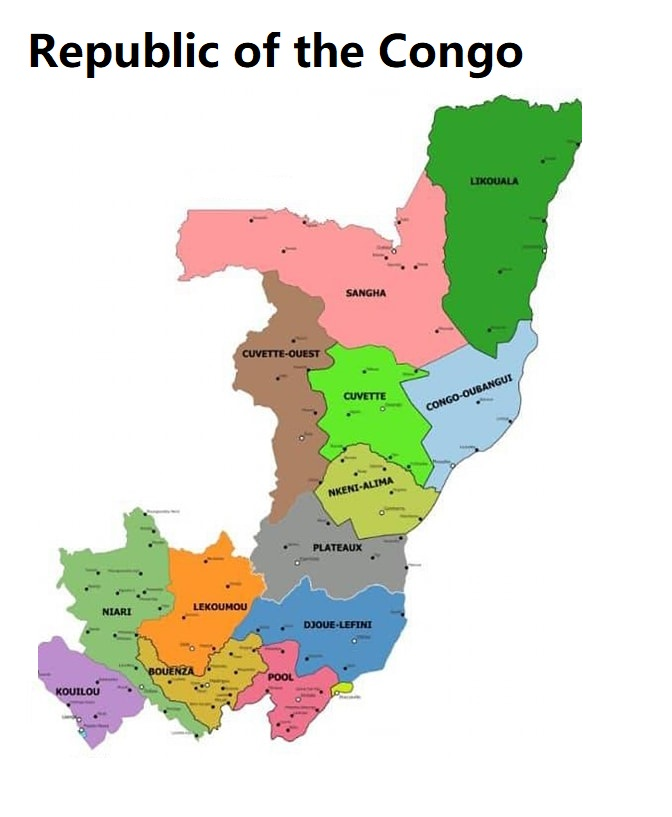
- Category: Unitary State
- Location: Republic of the Congo
- Number: 15 departments
- Populations: 100,559 (Lékoumou) – 2,145,783 (Brazzaville) in 2023
- Areas: 750 km^{2} (288 sq mi) (Pointe-Noire) – 23,936 sq mi (61,993 km^{2}) (Likouala)
- Government: Department government
- Subdivisions: Commune, District

The Republic of the Congo is divided into 15 departments (départements) since the adoption of the corresponding laws in October 2024. These departments replaced the former regions (régions, singular région) in 2002:

According to the laws published in October 2024 and the cartographic coordinates, the new departments are:

- Congo-Oubangui. Formed by the districts of Bokoma, Loukoléla and Mossaka (all formerly in Cuvette Department) and Liranga (formerly in Likouala Department).
- Nkéni-Alima. Formed by the districts of Makotimpoko, Ongogni, Gamboma, Abala and Allembé (all formerly in Plateau Department).
- Djoué-Léfini. Formed by the districts of Ngabé, Mayama, Vindza, Kimba and Ignié (all formerly in Pool Department}.

Brazzaville Department is sub-divided into 9 arrondissements and Pointe-Noire Department is sub-divided into 6 arrondissements. The other regions are sub-divided into more than 100 districts and 16 communes; which are further subdivided into urban communities (communautés urbaines) and rural communities (communautés rurales); which are further subdivided into quarters or neighborhoods (quartiers) and villages.

| Department | Capital | Area in km^{2} | Pop'n (2023 Census) | Pop'n density (per km^{2} in 2023) | Zone |
|---|---|---|---|---|---|
| Sangha | Ouesso | 55,800 | 209,701 | 3.8 | North |
| Likouala | Impfondo | 61,993 | 325,429 | 5.24 | North |
| Congo-Oubangui | Mossaka | 25,536 | 124,100 | 4.86 | North |
| Cuvette | Owando | 26,765 | 222,640 | 8.3 | North |
| Cuvette-Ouest | Ewo | 26,600 | 119,328 | 4.5 | North |
| Nkéni-Alima | Gamboma | 17,406 | 154,230 | 8.86 | North |
| Plateaux | Djambala | 20,994 | 129,191 | 6.15 | North |
| Sub-totals | Northern zone | 235,094 | 1,284,619 | 5.46 | |
| Djoué-Léfini | Odziba | 23,560 | 174,761 | 7.41 | Southeast |
| Brazzaville | Brazzaville | 588 | 2,145,783 | 3,649 | Southeast |
| Pool | Kinkala | 10,395 | 219,771 | 21.14 | Southeast |
| Bouenza | Madingou | 12,265 | 363,850 | 29.7 | South |
| Lékoumou | Sibiti | 20,950 | 100,559 | 4.8 | South |
| Niari | Dolisie | 25,942 | 334,863 | 12.9 | South |
| Kouilou | Loango | 13,103 | 119,162 | 7.8 | Southwest |
| Pointe-Noire | Pointe-Noire | 288 | 1,398,812 | 666 | Southwest |
| Sub-totals | Southern zone | 107,091 | 4,857,561 | 45.36 | |

== See also ==
- Communes of the Republic of the Congo
- Districts of the Republic of the Congo
- ISO 3166-2:CG
