= Vili people =

Ethnic group in Gabon, Republic of the Congo, and Democratic Republic of the Congo

Vili
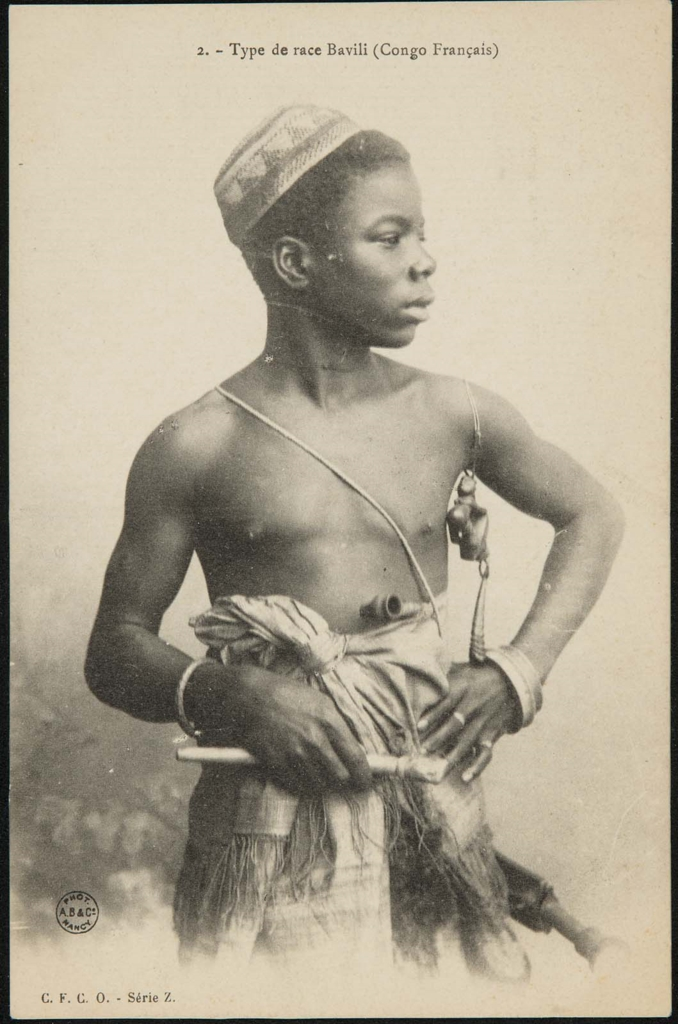
- A Vili young boy photography from circa 1910

Total population
- 100 000

Regions with significant populations
- Republic of the Congo; Gabon; Democratic Republic of the Congo; Angola

Languages
- Vili, French, Portuguese

Religion
- Christianity, African Traditional Religion and religious syncretism

Related ethnic groups
- Kongo people, Woyo people, Lindji people, Kotchi people, Yombe people, Punu people, Lumbu people and Kugni people

Vili
- Person: M'vili, N'fiote, Ivili, Mus' Lwango, Vili
- People: Buvili, Bufiote, Ivili, Bas' Lwango
- Language: Civili
- Country: Si I Luango

The Vili people are a Central African Bantu ethnic group, established in southwestern Gabon, the Republic of Congo, Cabinda and the Democratic Republic of Congo. They are a subgroup of the Kongo people.

With the Yombe, the Lumbu, the Vungu, the Punu and the Kugni, they lived harmoniously within the former Kingdom of Loango. They have even developed with the Kugni, the Bundiku, a good neighborly relationship to avoid conflicts.

The Vili culture is rich in a secular history, a matrilineal society which is the foundation of the Vili language full of nuances where proverbs have a prominent place; of an original measurement system, of a spirituality whose Nkisi, Nkisi Konde, or "nail fetishes", are the famous physical representation. These artifacts are "commentaries by themselves". They provide keys to the understanding of creativity and identity that prevailed at the time of their creation.

While abundant documentation exists concerning the history of the Kingdom of Kongo, the Kingdom of Loango is much less documented by the written sources.

The Vili have very early maintained relations of equal to equal with the Westerners, especially in trade. However, this contact with the West and engagement in the slave trade enriched a tiny minority at the cost of upsetting the societal structure of the Vili. The epidemics of trypanosomiasis and smallpox further drastically decreased the population of this people.

== Name ==
Depending on the source and context, there are several forms: Bavili, Bavilis, Fiote, Ivili, Loango, Vilis. The term fiote ("black"), used by Portuguese settlers, is now considered pejorative. The term of Vili also refers to their cultures, and traditions.

== Language ==
They speak the Vili, a Bantu language whose number of speakers was estimated at 50 000 in 2010. Approximately 45 000 were counted in the Republic of Congo and 5 000 in Gabon. The other known names and dialect names are : Civili, Civili ci Luango, Civili ci Moongo, Civili ci Waanda, Civili ci Yombe, Fiot, Fiote, Tshivili, Tsivili. The close ethnic group are: Kotchi, Lindji, Ciyoombe, Woyo, Yombe, Yoombe.

== History ==
=== The origins ===
Bukulu vandu vandu! Batu lumogni vandu vandu! Misenge i fue.
Sin nganzi si ke mogni. Si sitshike mambu me toba, me ntume koku e e

— Vili slogan: chanted by the sages and assistance during the palavers in the "Moandza" (palaver's house).
Translation:

Honors to the Elders! Honors to the Living!
Mangroves plants appear to be dead, but the shoots and roots are still perennial.

The Vili, as well as the Yombe (ethnically closest cultural and geographically to Vili people), the Lumbu, the Vungu, the Punu and the Kugni, formed the ethnic components of the ancient kingdom of Loango. There were also intermingling with pygmy populations of the Babenzi, the Binga or Baka.

In the sixteenth century, the Bawoyo dynasty, which belongs to the mighty Brotherhood of Blacksmiths of the Buvandji, led by Njimbe, and based on an army of warriors, is imposed on the local people on the coast of Loango. According to several sources, such as the English explorer Andrew Battel, present in the region around 1610, the Dutchman Olfert Dapper, as well as the English trader R.E. Dennett, Njimbe would be the founder of the Kingdom of Loango and his first sovereign with a reign that would have lasted about sixty years.

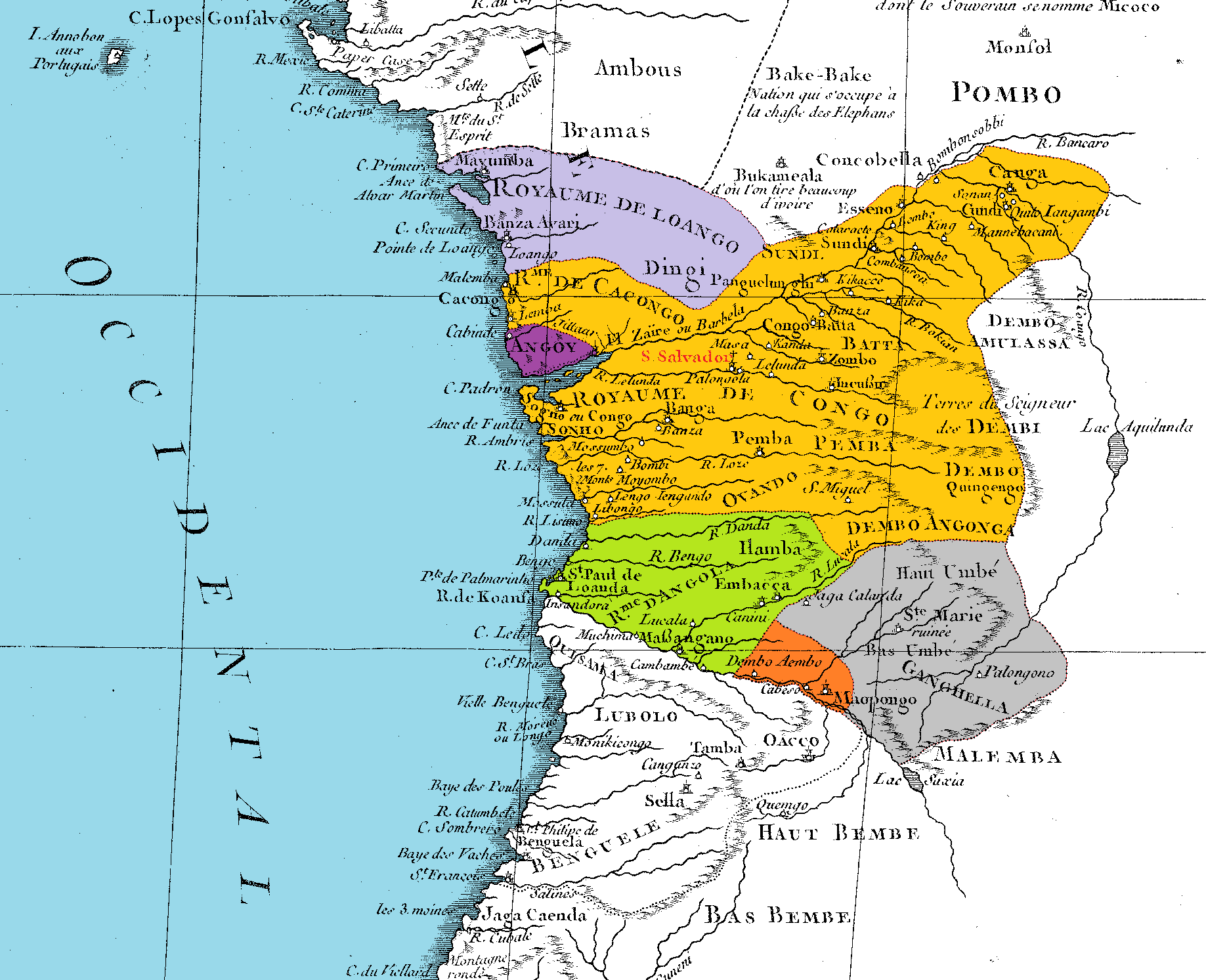
Map of West-Centgral African kingdoms, including the Kingdom of Loango and neighboring Kingdom of Kongo.

Initially, the province of the Kingdom of Kongo (Kongo Dia Nthotila – Kongo of the King), the Kingdom of Loango, in the company of the two provinces of Ngoyo and Kakongo, was freed in the sixteenth century and occupied a vast territory ranging from the region of Setté Cama to Gabon, to the current Cabinda to the south, from the Massif of Mayombe to the east to the confines of the Anziku Kingdom and the Atlantic Ocean to the west, where the capital Bwali was located. A proverb clearly illustrates the original community of the three secessionist provinces, as well as the religious role of the king of Ngoyo. This is: "Makongo Nnuni, Mangoyo Nthomi, Maloangu nkasi" which literally means "the Makongo is the husband, the Mangoyo the priest (keeper and officiating of the Tchibila Shrine of the god Bunzi) and the Malwangu the woman".

The ruling family was derived from the Vili ethnic group, specifically the Kondi and Nkata clans. This state had a social and political organization with a king, a government and governors of its seven provinces. The strong political prioritization allowed some chroniclers to establish an analogy with the feudal societies of medieval Europe. At the time Loango was already prevalent an elective mechanism, particularly in the designation of the future sovereign.

Costumes of the inhabitants of Loango (engravings dating from 1797)

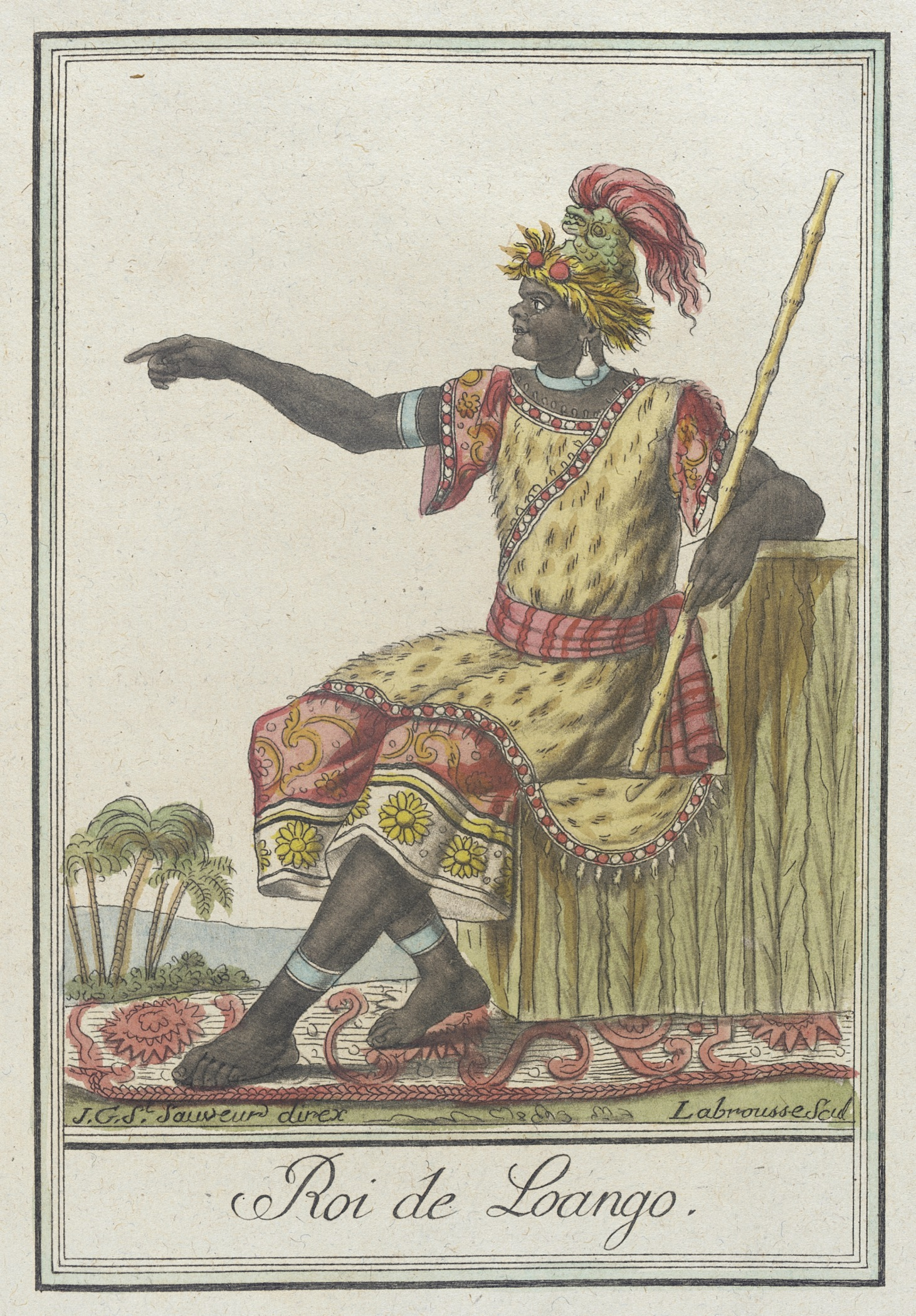
Maloango - King of Loango.

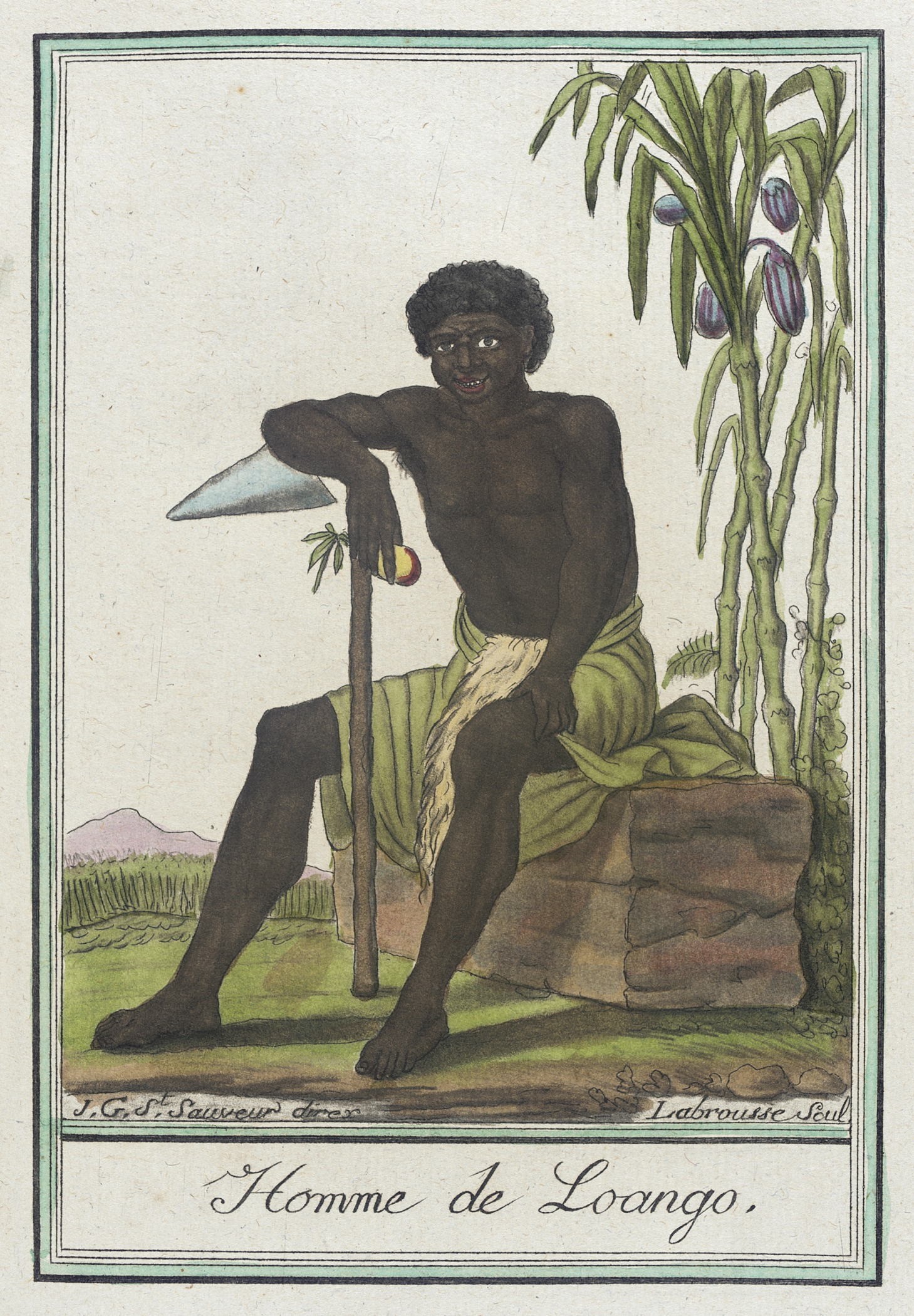
Man of Loango.

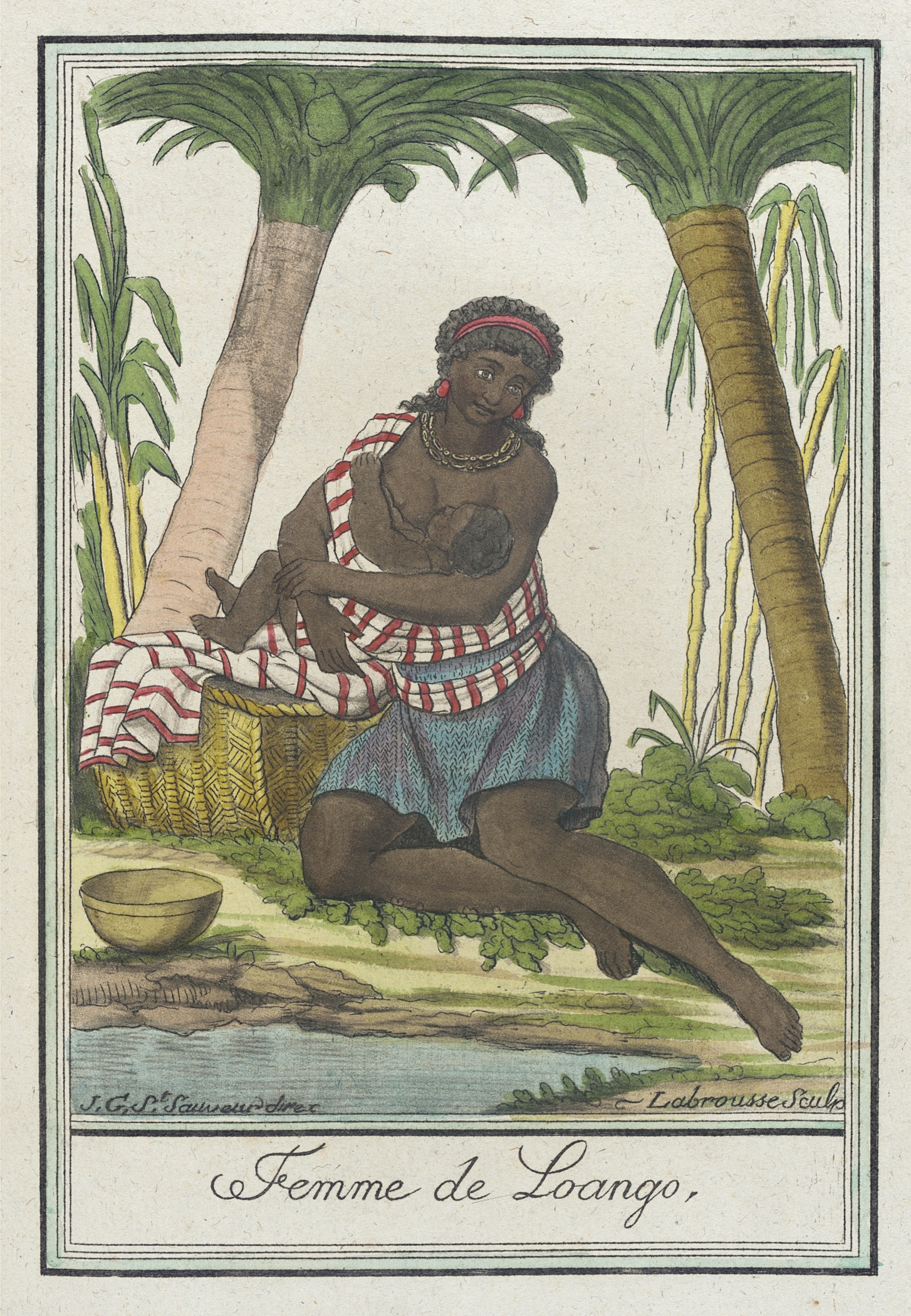
Women of Loango.

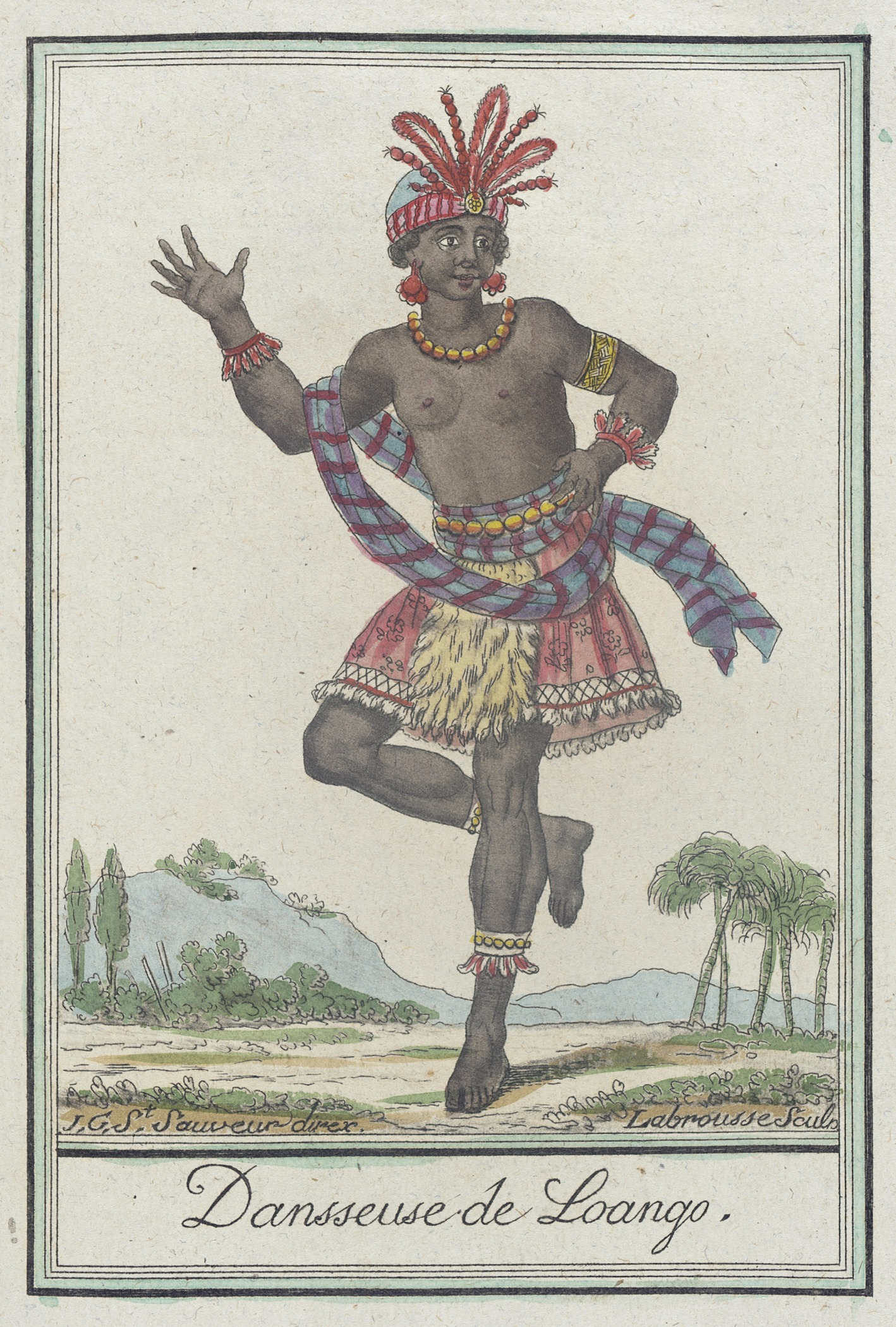
Loango dancer.

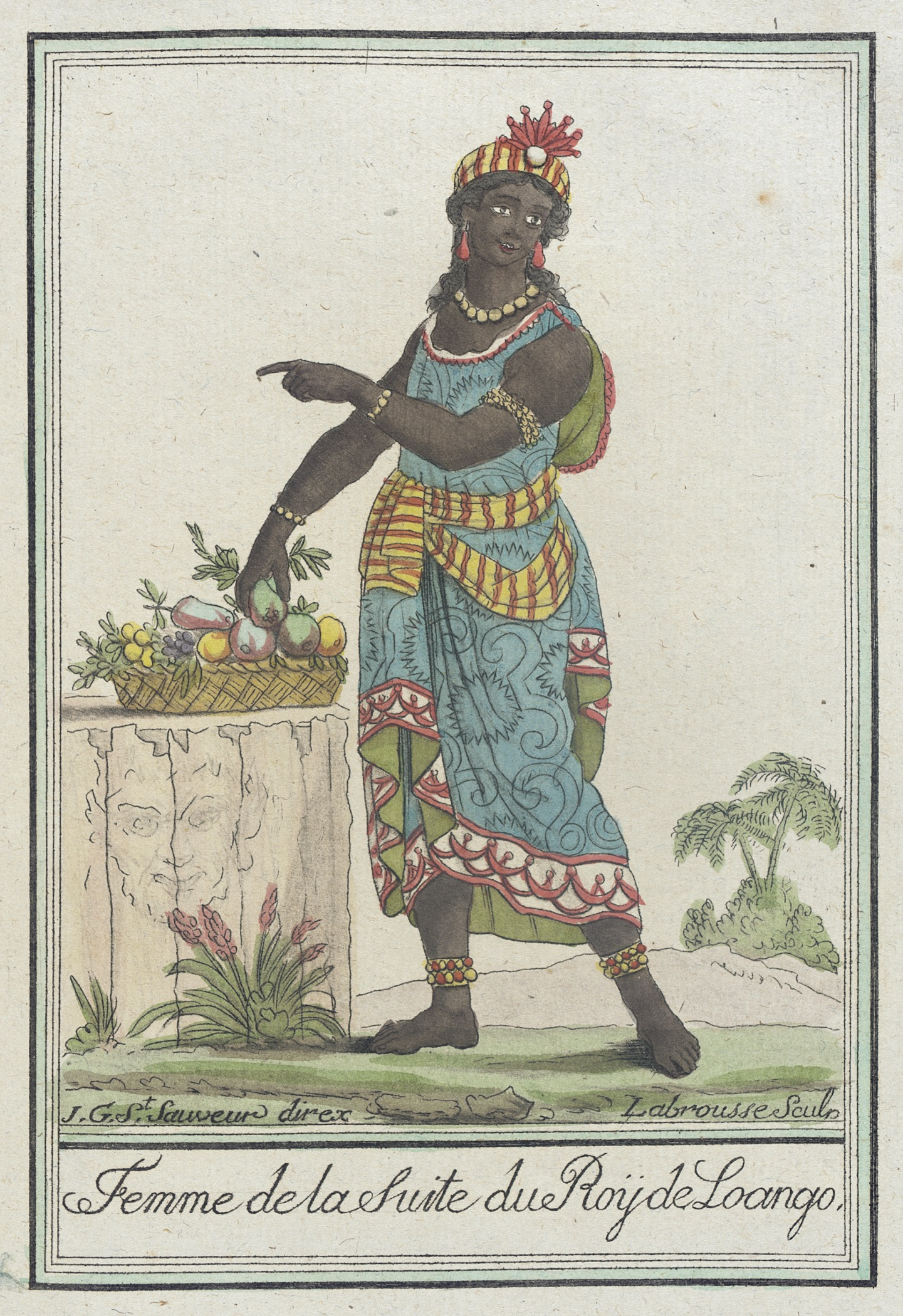
Wife of the suite of the king of Loango.

In the history of the Kingdom of Loango, there is no visible trace. However, he soon made exchanges with the Europeans, mostly Portuguese, escaped from the bagnes or former ebony traffickers. Germans, Englishmen, Dutch, had opened Factoreries in the vicinity of the larger villages.

=== European colonization ===
==== From 1849 to 1944 – Expansion ====
===== The decline of the Kingdom of Loango =====
In 1849, as a favour for the boarding of the Brazilian ship Elizia or Ilizia by the frigate Penelope of the French Navy, some thirty or several hundred slaves from the Vili, Lumbu, Yaka or Bongo ethnic groups, according to the sources, after a three-year stay in Senegal, were permanently installed in the Komo estuary among the Mpongwé villages. This incident marked the birth of Libreville, the political capital of Gabon, like Freetown in Sierra Leone.

The end of the nineteenth century marked the beginning of the decline of the Kingdom of Loango. The latter suffered from the collateral damage of the rivalry of Europeans in Central Africa, notably between Pierre Savorgnan de Brazza and the explorer Henry Morton Stanley. To ensure the unilateral control of the sea front of the Congo and Gabon, France imposed treaties on the traditional authorities.

The Ma Loango Manimakosso-Tchinkosso, which reigned from 1879 to 1885, weakened by the blockade of the coast established by the Sagittaire ship, preventing any contact between the villages, was forced to capitulate. On 12 March 1883, he signed with ship Lieutenant Robert Cordier, a treaty of sovereignty, trade and disposal of the Territory, in the presence of the Portuguese traders Manuel Saboga and French Ferdinand Pichot. Moreover, the central power of the Ma Loango fades to the benefit of local potentates. Some of them, among them André Moe-Loemba (indigenous raised by the Portuguese missions, founder of the village of Tchimbamba), Mamboma Makosso, Mvumvo Lucieno and Matchimbamba initialled, on 21 June 1883, the Treaty of Punta-Negra, with the same ship Lieutenant Cordier, allowing France to take possession of this territory, At the same time, in the Portuguese-speaking perimeter, two years later, on 25 February 1885, the princes and notables of the kingdoms of Kakongo, Loango and Ngoyo signed with Guillerme Auguste de Brito Capello, commander of the Corvette Rainha of Portugal, the Treaty of Simulambuco that puts them under the protection of the Kingdom of Portugal,

The Kingdom of Belgium signed no less than 289 treaties between 1883 and 1884 in the conquest of the valley of Kouilou-Niari, territory ceded to France at the Berlin Conference in 1885. It ratifies all these treaties making France the absolute ruler of the part of Central Africa from the right bank of the Congo River to the confines of Gabon, thus completing the sharing of Africa between the colonial powers. The control of coastal bases also allowed the departure of numerous expeditions which took place to Chad and even Sudan (Fashoda Incident). Loango, the capital, then houses the Government and the official institutions, managing the internal and external trade. This is the only outlet for the caravan trails to the ocean. At Pointe-Noire, the current economic capital, there are a number of fishing villages such as Bou Mvou-Mvou (Novotel hotel's location on Charles de Gaulle Avenue); – literally Mvoumvou would mean what lasts, what is eternal and by extension M;Bou Mvoumvou It is the beach, the eternal Sea-, M'Boukou (current Mouyondzi District).

The current peripheral areas of Pointe-Noire at this time are only villages: Loandjili, Siafoumou, Tchimbamba, Mpita, Tchimani ... In 1888, the Vili of Gabon occupied Mayumba and exchanged with the Lumbu located along the Banio Lagoon. These two peoples of the Kongo group understand each other without an interpreter.

King Lumbu Mayombe Ignondrou, the oldest in the region, commanded the Mayombe, Mayumba and part of Setté Cama. He settles the discussions between the clan leaders Vili and Lumbu. The Vili of Mayumba are commissioned by Goufila, and have emancipated themselves from the Ma Loango. The Vili traders of Loango who went to Setté Cama by the coast, are also often stripped of their bundles of cloths.

===== Decline of the city of Loango and emergence of Pointe-Noire =====
In 1897, the completion of the Matadi-Leopoldville railway, and especially the foundation of Pointe-Noire in 1922, and the construction of a deep-water port and a railway line, precipitated the decline of the Loango Capital. Indeed, its bay with its low draught does not allow the landing of ships for the traffic of persons and goods. Loango then only welcomed the burials of the nobles Vili and the settlers. Moreover, the shipyards of the new port and the Congo Ocean Railway pushed the men to emigrate to Pointe-Noire. Except for the small fishing village of Ndjindji, it is the workers of these two shipyards which constituted the bulk of the indigenous Pointe-Noire population. The city also sees the arrival of people attracted by the induced jobs. These include traders from Gabon, Dahomey, Togo and Ghana.

The French colonizers, anxious to avoid conflicts with the natives, reserve the areas of swamps, unfit for agriculture and empty of population. They also recognize customary law: the non-fertile land belongs to the whole community. But this rule is not always respected. Thus, in 1910, the village Koùmbi Bouilika was removed from the map. Its inhabitants, headed by the chief Louissi Sakala, said the elder son of the patriarch Nfouk'-Lassy, were expelled and expropriated from this land by the will of the settlers in the yardstick of the development of Pointe-Noire. The latter, having not found any suitable sites other than this plateau to build a runway that could accommodate aircraft, have therefore unfortunately relocated to this village which was on the current location of the Agostinho Neto airport of Pointe-Noire. It stretched between the current air base and the Tchinouka River, and was adjacent to the villages of Ntié-Tié, Mboukou, Mpaka, Mpolo, Tchimani, Ngoyo, Tchibambouka, Mpita, Tchinouka, Malala and Tchimbamba.

In 1924, Hervé Mapako-Gnali, father of Mambou Aimée Gnali and Jean-Félix Tchicaya became the first teachers of the Middle Congo to get out of the William Ponty school on the island of Gorée in Senegal. The need for manpower causes the massive influx of people from the interior (which the natives call Bilanda Lail, "rail followers"); Their housing needs contribute to the development of the city. The Vilis, which were hitherto the majority inhabitants of the region, must now share the land and work with the allochthonous populations. They see their habitat area diminishing according to the atomization of the kingdom.

The Kouilou, in addition to being a land of immigration, is also a land of emigration and expatriation during colonization. The creation of coffee and cocoa plantations in Fernando Po and Sao Tomé, Portage, schooling and the prospect of receiving a salary cause a significant departure from the local labour force towards Brazzaville, Gabon and Ubangi-Shari. Moreover, the Vili, as opposed to the Yombe people, are less attached to the land because of their commercial vocation and their positioning as intermediaries between the populations of the hinterland and the European traffickers. All these migratory flows will provoke an important rural exodus, accentuating the ageing and gender imbalance. The continuous depopulation of Bwali, the capital of the former Kingdom of Loango is illustrated.

The combination of epidemics of smallpox and trypanosomiasis, as well as the use of the test poison (ordeal) to designate the culprits, in particular of suspicious death, also contribute to the decrease in the population of the descendants of the Kingdom of Loango.

==== From 1945 to 1960 – Decolonization ====
France came out bled of the Second World War. Through a constituent assembly, it sets up new institutions to revive the country's political activity. The representativeness of France is then extended to the Overseas territories such as the AEF, whose indigenous people have the opportunity to elect representatives. While the old colonies like the West Indies elect their deputies by universal suffrage, the AEF. and AOF have two separate electoral colleges: the first reserved for metropolitan citizens and the second for indigenous, non-citizens. Gabon and the Middle Congo, because of their low population, constitute a single constituency for the election of a Member of Parliament for this second college.

On 7 December 1945, after a second round, Jean-Félix Tchicaya was elected member of the Assembly, before Jean-Hilaire Aubame, Jacques Opangault, Issembé and François-Moussa Simon respectively. Being born in Libreville, the place of emigration of his father, the tailor Makosso Tchicaya allowed the winner to take over his competitors including the Gabonese candidates. In addition to the fact that he worked in Gabon and developed strong friendships, he received the votes of the Vili and Lumbu of the Ngounie, and of the Ogooué-Maritime. However, the rivalry between the Middle Congo and Gabon, as well as between the Vili and the Mpongwe, the first two ethnicities of the two countries to have been in contact with Western civilization will lead to separation into two separate constituencies.

In 1946, Jean-Félix Tchicaya, grand slayer of Colonialism at the French National Assembly, where he sits throughout the fourth Republic, founded his party the PPC. (Congolese Progressive Party), close to the French Communist Party, in the company of young executives such as Joseph Pouabou or Robert Stéphane Tchitchelle. The latter, right arm of the founder, will be the main animator of the party in Pointe-Noire and Kouilou. He rallies around him, all the railwaymen of the Congo-Ocean Railway. In 1956, he scrambled with his mentor and joined Abbé Youlou to found the UDDIA (Democratic Union for the Defence of African interests). The latter party, by politically mobilizing the Laris (inhabitants of Pool district and Brazzaville), takes political leadership on the PPC and allows Stéphane Tchitchelle to become the first indigenous mayor of Pointe-Noire. He later held several ministerial positions.

The Congo-Brazzaville, in these years of decolonization, is considered one of the frontlines of the anti-communist struggle in French speaking Africa area. Paris wants at all costs that the future independent Congo not be held by the "Reds", but by a friend political leader. Paris had also initially hoped to make Brazzaville the pivot of French action in Central Africa in the direction of Congo-Kinshasa, because all the plots that were aimed at the former Belgian Congo were passed through Brazzaville.

France also anxious to master the aspirations emancipatory in its colonies, uses secret agents such as the Dahomean Antoine Hazoume, masterpiece of the PPC. Then passed to the UDDIA, or the French Secret Service, to approach the Congolese politicians. Hazoume is a French intelligence officer who was treated by Maurice Robert [the chief Africa of the French Secret Service], and he had joined the political team of Jean Mauricheau-Beaupré [chargé de Mission at the General Secretariat for African Affairs]. African heads of state such as Fulbert Youlou, Félix Houphouët-Boigny or Ngarta Tombalbaye made him confiance. It is indeed through its intermediary that France will favour starting from 1956, the victory of Youlou (action on the scale of Congolese territory), to put it on the same footing of equality as its two main rivals Jean-Félix Tchicaya and Jacques Opangault. Then France obtained the accession of Youlou and that of its party in the RDA African Democratic Rally (Rassemblement Démocratique Africain). (Action at the African level) at the beginning of the year 1958; Thus directly competing with Tchicaya, who then withdrew from the RDA. Finally, France opens to Youlou the gates of a universe normally reserved only for African MPs (action at the French level) in this case at Tchicaya.

The African Socialist Movement (MSA) by Jacques Opangault, a local offshoot of the French international and working-class Section (SFIO) of Guy Mollet, won the elections of the Territorial Assembly of 1957. This majority does not survive the defection of Georges Yambot, Member of Parliament for the Grand Niari, thereby tipping the leadership of the MSA. To the UDDIA within the Territorial Assembly in November 1958. Bloody riots and vandalism erupted in Brazzaville and Pointe-Noire, mainly between nationals of the Lari and Mbochi ethnic groups. This troubled period will coincide with the transfer of the capital of the middle Congo from Pointe-Noire to Brazzaville. Thus, part of the administrative, political and economic decisions concerning the city of Pointe-Noire are now taken in Brazzaville.

=== Post political Independence ===
The Post independence destiny of the Vili people is closely linked to the geo-political and economic evolution of the republics of Congo, Democratic Congo, Gabon and Angola.

==== Angola ====
Cabinda province map (Angola).

Cabinda was incorporated into the Portuguese colonial Empire, separately from its large neighbour of southern Angola. Indeed, already at that time the two territories were separated by the Congo River.

The second article of the Treaty of Simulambuco, signed in 1885, is often used as an argument by Cabindis separatists. It states that Portugal must ensure the integrity of the Territories under its protection. The Cabindis celebrated in 2005, the 120th anniversary of this Treaty, to the dismay of the Angolan authorities who consider this treaty to be contrary to the state of fact, making Cabinda an Angolan enclave. This differentiated reading of the Treaty is also at the origin of the age-old conflict between the two Parties.

==== Gabon ====
===== Mayumba =====
The Vili of Gabon are mainly located in Mayumba. This locality, which has about 5000 souls, is the last Gabonese city before accessing the neighbouring Congo border. The region of Mayumba is known for its still unspoiled wilderness, its immense beaches that stretch out of sight, beaten by violent waves and violent currents.This wild side is highlighted by the Mayumba National Park, which covers about 870 square kilometers. It is the protected sanctuary where a wide spectrum of animal and plant species flourishes. They include crocodiles, chimpanzees, gorillas, various monkeys, leopards, elephants, antelopes, buffaloes. It is also a great place to observe different species of birds. The aquatic species are not left with sharks, humpback whales, dolphins and leatherback turtles that come to lay on the beaches. The equatorial forest and the mangroves are home to abundant species of precious trees and plants. The once prosperous city became ghostly. In fact, there is no viable economic sector. The exploitation of wood, which was the pride of Mayumba, was struck by the economic crisis and by the ban on the export of precious wood and logs.

For export business, only the fishing village of Beninese and Togolese origin serves as a port. Yet the laying of the first stone for the construction of a deep water port dates from 1975, under the chairmanship of Omar Bongo. Until today this work is still not out of the ground and the inhabitants are still waiting, because its viability is not obvious.

===== Libreville =====
The Vili are established long time in the districts of Libreville: Montagne Sainte, Avenue-de-Cointet, Nombakélé, Petit-Paris, Mont-Boni, Campagne, Glass, Toulon, plein-Niger, Louis. In the 1940s, three of the six great neighborhood leaders, respected, sharing the place of Libreville were Vili: Lamou for Petit-Paris, Loembe for Nombakélé and Loueyi for Toulon-Glass During the war of 1962, triggered for a goal denied during a match between the national football teams of Gabon (Azingo National) and Congo (Diables rouges), all Gabonese nationals of Congo and vice versa all Congolese of Gabon had been expelled from the two host countries. The Vilis of Libreville, which were few and well identified in the indigenous and Gabonese ethnic strains, were, however, were not disturbed.

The name of the district ', whose semantics can vary according to the intonation, means:

Ah U Kèbè! Dangerous! Attention! or: Kéba! Attention, sorry or: Kèbe, keep one thing

==== Congo-Brazzaville ====
In Congo-Brazzaville, abbé Fulbert Youlou led the country to independence which was initialled on 15 August 1960. Stéphane Tchitchellé was a member of the Congolese delegation on 28 July 1960, which signed the agreements, ensuring the transfer of powers from the French authorities to the Congolese authorities. He also became vice President of the Republic. This short-lived euphoria makes way for the takeover of Power by the revolutionary MNR (National Revolution Movement) during the days of 13, 14 and 15 August 1963, which establish the courts of exception and the witch hunt. Personalities like Stéphane Tchitchellé or Victor-Justin Sathoud, for instance were put in prison. The first President of the Supreme Court of the Congo Joseph Pouabou, the director of the Congolese Information agency Abbé Anselme Massouémé, both Vili and native of the Pointe-Noire region and the first Prosecutor of the Republic Lazare Matsocota, originally from the Pool, are abducted and murdered on the night of 14–15 February 1965. Above the horror, the body of Joseph Pouabou was never found. The perpetrators of these crimes have never been identified to date. In 1968, the militarization of the Congolese political landscape began. Progressive soldiers with their heads, Lieutenant Marien Ngouabi and other officers such as Alfred Raoul and Louis Sylvain Goma, all three Saint-Cyriens (Saint-Cyr is a French Military Academy), made their entry into the political scene in favour of a coup. A revolutionary Court of Justice is established. Ngouoniba Nsari and Christophe Moukouéké are the president and vice President respectively.

The group of "Mpita" consisting of three Vili originating in the region of the Kouilou that are, the police officer André Tchicya, the two financial administrators Paul Bouanga and Georges Goma is accused by this Court of Justice of flirting with capitalists and therefore to work against the development and interests of the Congo. They will be acquitted by the same court on 26 September 1969.

Stanislas Batchi, former headmaster of the Lycée Chaminade (Drapeau Rouge), was president of the popular court and was dubbed the "red Prosecutor". In this capacity, he was instructed to investigate cases involving his friends or accused who claimed the same ethnic identity as him. Thus, by asking Stéphane Tchitchéllé to stand up, the latter, astonished to see him play this role as hangman, reminded him in the Vili language, all the services he had rendered to the Prosecutor and all the times, where he had received him for dinner. Stanislas Batchi replied that he was not in the process of settling a family dispute, but a highly important matter related to the security of the state.This example from the "Mpita Group" case shows how to violating the rules of mutual assistance, by using cynicism towards his own, by getting their hands dirty, allegiance to the new political order and safeguarding his Position in the leading core. It is also an illustration of the propensity of Vili to focus on individual success at the expense of the community. This is the exact opposite, with a few exceptions, of the functioning of the Lari and the Kongo peoples of the south part of the Republic of Congo, of the citizens of the Niari Valley, or of the Mbochis of the Cuvette Department for whom solidarity is a sacred value.

During the Seventies decade, the young country that became the People's Republic of the Congo asked all young foreign-trained executives to return to the fold to accompany its development. Women once confined to the role of reproductive and domestic work, are emancipated and also take part in the development of the country. Thus, politically, Josephine Bouanga was elected president of the revolutionary Union of women of the Congo (URFC) at the end of the 2nd Extraordinary Congress of this Organization held on 15 November 1969. She replaces this function, Céline Claudette Eckomband Yandza.

In civil society, in the precinct of the Brazzaville courthouse, Agathe Pembellot Mambou, sworn on 11 March 1973. She became the first female magistrate of the Republic of Congo.

== Demography and Territory ==
=== Demographics ===
The Kouilou department covers the maritime façade of the Republic of Congo. This territory is occupied mainly on the coastal plain to the West, by the Vili, and in the Mayombe Forest Massif in the east by the Yombe. The Vili and te Yombe languages are mutually intelligible.

The North is occupied by the Lumbu minorities (bantu Échira) and Pygmy Babongo.

The Vili are mainly distributed in a triangle formed by the Atlantic coast as a base, going from Madingo-Kayes to the Cabinda border and the locality of Tchikanou on the road to Tchitondi (formerly Holle) as the summit. In addition to those mentioned above, they are found in the villages of Tchilunga, Longo-Bondi, Ntandu Yumbi, Tchissanga, Ntupu, Lendji, Bueti, Hinda, Makola, Bambala, Nanga, Tchivula, Nkumbi, Tangu Mbata, Diosso, Mabindu, Lubu, Mpili and Tchissekeni.

Their residential area has been gradually reduced due to the atomization of the Kingdom of Loango, for more than one hundred and fifty years, corresponding roughly to the Treaty of Tchimbamba signed on 21 June 1883, allowing France to take possession of the territory. indeed, the French penetration and the brewing of the induced populations, promote the spread of serious epidemics of smallpox and trypanosomiasis (sickness of sleep). The requisition of all men in the force of the age to carry on the back of men, the goods landed at Loango, as well as the use of the test poison to designate the culprits, in particular of suspicious death, will contribute to the decrease of the population of the descendants of the Kingdom of Loango. Drought-induced shortages will push the Vili to move to the Mayombe or to emigrate. They have since kept this soul of travelers.

The construction of the Congo-Océan railway decimates the local populations via pneumococcal and dysentery, so that Sara brought back from Chad and Banda from the Ubangi-Shari will be able to complete the project in human lives.

Between 1925 and 1949, the birth and rise of Pointe-Noire will depopulate the villages of the Hinterland. Schooling and the attraction for the urban lifestyle will accentuate rural loss. From 1962, the number of Vili established in Pointe-Noire exceeds that of those in rural areas. In 1965, the Vili ethnic group was absorbed to almost 60% by the implantation of the city of Pointe-Noire on these lands. More than the others, it has suffered the full brunt of the consequences of urbanization and the distentions of traditional tenure.

In 1957, the anthropologist Maurice Chabeuf estimated at 36 000, the number of Vili nationals and wondered how this people had not yet disappeared despite all these endured scourges.

Nowadays, most of the villages are located along the routes of communication (roads, CFCO).

Outside Pointe-Noire, the economic capital, the population density of the Kouilou is generally very low. From 1.7 hab./km2 to 1984, it rose to 6.8 hab./km2 in 2017. however, there are areas of tension for access to natural resources (hunting and fisheries) and land control, such as the Conkouati Lagoon.

Although spared during the civil wars of 1993 and 1997, Pointe-Noire and its hinterland will see a mass flock of migrants from the Pool Department and the countries of the Niari. The unsuitable infrastructure still does not allow to this day to absorb this overflow of population. which accentuates land pressure.

=== Territory ===
==== Si / Tsi ====
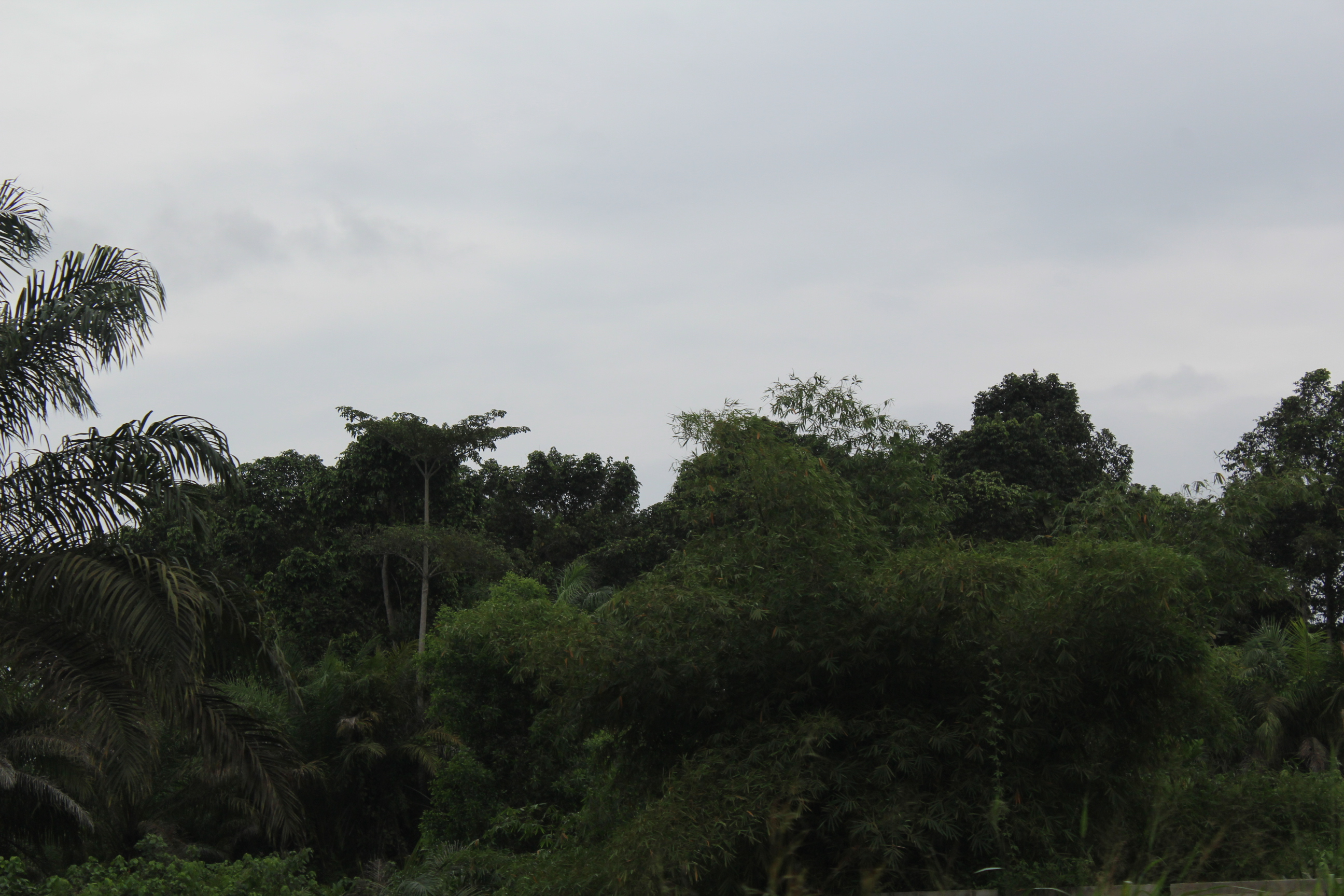
Rain forest close to Diosso- Pointe-Noire (Republic of Congo)

Si in Vili language or Tsi in Yombe language refers to inclusive land and its resources, the territory, the country. Members of the matriclan (likanda) have in community land, goods and interests visible and invisible. Clan territory (Si likanda) limits are set by the geniuses, force spirits of the ancestors of the clan (nkisi in singular and bakisi if plural) and not by men. These limits may be rivers, hills, edges of forests...

The ministering spirits prefer quiet places and migrate to more peaceful places, when they are disturbed, thus causing the migration of the clan. The places of residence of the geniuses (tchibila) or sanctuaries are sources, rivers, mountains (Mount Bamba in the Mayombe), circuses (Diosso Gorge), the gorges of Sunda, isolated trees or groves.

==== Control of land ====
===== The State =====
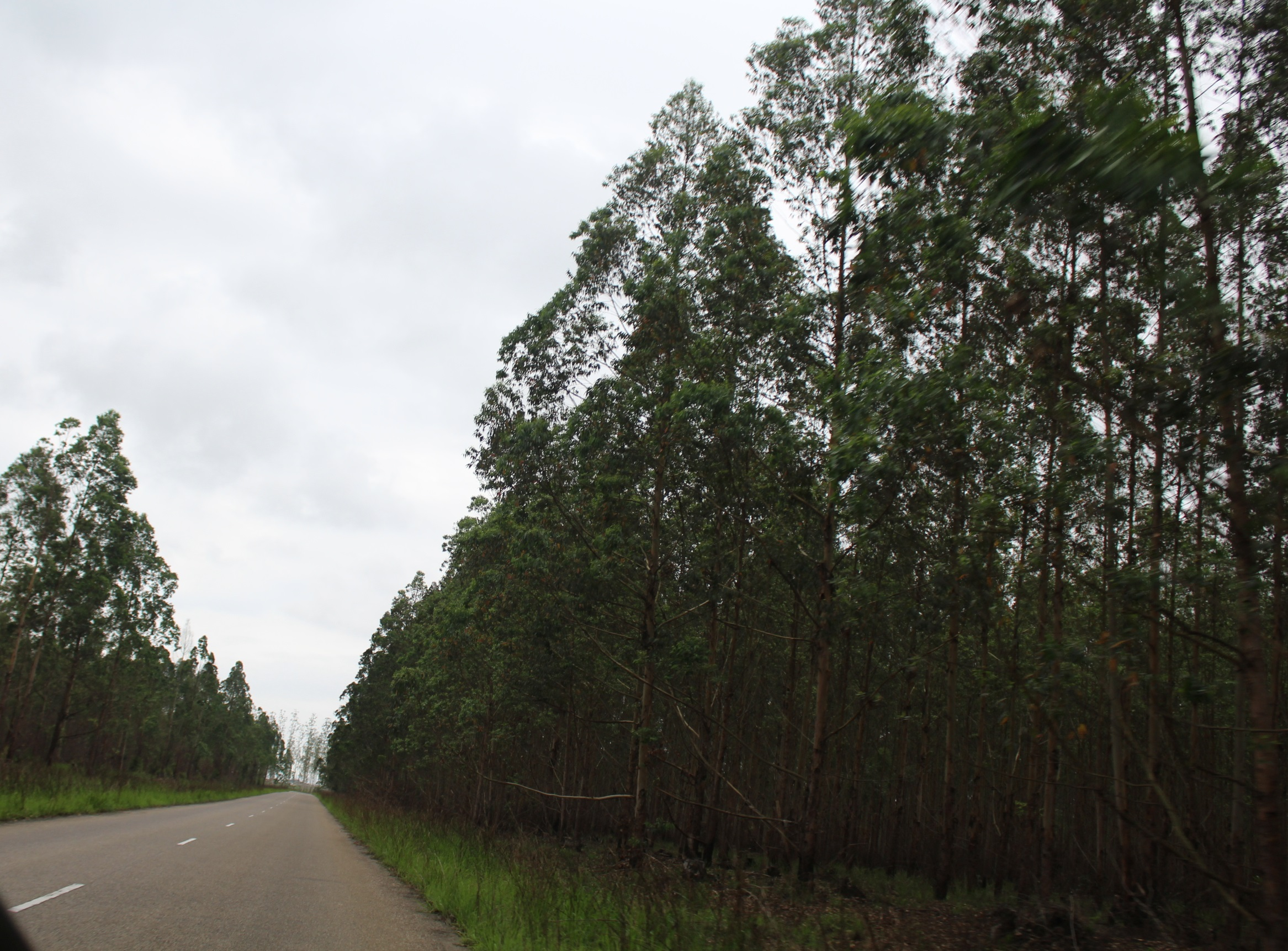
Eucalyptus Plantations in Diosso area close to Pointe-Noire (Republic of Congo)

The State grants operating permits to the oil companies (Total, ENI)... and other industrial companies like EFC (Eucalyptus fiber Congo) formerly UAIC (Unit of industrial afforestation of the Congo). Thus, concessions were granted to plant 10,000 ha of eucalyptus around Pointe-Noire, Hinda, Loango Bay and North Bas-Kouilou .

The State also guarantees every Congolese citizen the possibility to settle anywhere. The motto of the Congolese Party of Labor (PCT), the former single party "everything for the people and for the people" served to bail from populations of other regions to settle in the Kouilou. However, authoritarianism and the predominance of the populations of the North to power was favored them in this land game at the expense of the people of the South (Vili and Yombe in mind).

===== Aboriginal people =====
With the sovereign national conference of 1991, the restoration of the kingdoms of Loango and Anziku (Teke) was followed by a claim of the restoration of the "ancestral custom". The holding of this line was none other than François-Xavier Tchitembo, better known under his title of Ma Mboma Si Loango (Prime Minister of the Kingdom of Loango), Mayor of Bwali (Diosso) even Chief Tchitembo. This last undertook a restoration of the lineal power campaign, including the meeting of 6 July 1994 at Matombi (fishing village). He said that the return to the clan land tenure is a way to regulate the scarcity of game, the decline in the fishery and agricultural resources.

To weigh against the State developer and industrial operators, some people that are part of the regional elite are organized around the regional Association of the earthlings of the Kouilou (ARTK) established in 1992. This institution has allowed clans owners of the land on which the UAIC (plant of industrial afforestation of the Congo) had planted eucalyptus trees, to conduct illicit cut of wood, to get their land back and highlight. Indeed, without consultation with the heads of land, nor farmers who worked there, the administrative authorities have conceded these lands at the UAIC, considering them as unoccupied, while they were left fallow for 5 or 6 years.

With rampant expansion of the city of Pointe-Noire, the landowners, failing to highlight the territory in a concerted way, just sometimes practice that real estate speculation by selling plots of land to the highest bidder. So on the periphery of the economic capital, the satisfaction of immediate and individual needs takes precedence over the preservation of the heritage of the future and the collective interest.

===== Migrants =====
The natural resources of the Congolese coastal plain and the outlet is Pointe-Noire, the economic capital, attract immigrants from the four corners of Congolese territory, including the inhabitants of other areas of the Kouloiu.

Thus, in the absence of a job employee at Pointe-Noire, migrants engaged in the areas of fishing, agriculture or hunting. Thus, since the sixties, Teke from Ewo and Okoyo District in the Congolese basin (the basin of the Alima), settled in the marshes of the Ntombo and on the shores of lakes and lagoons crossed by the Loeme river to process fishing.

Moreover, the Teke and the Mbamba (Group Kota) from the Massif of the North, in the Lékoumou Department, engaged in hunting in the Massif of the Mayombe where they settled and in the park of Conkouati-Douli. Finally, around and near the pontenegrine settlement, some people from Pool department practice agricultural activities in rural areas.

In the Kouilou region, who do not have the attributes of sovereignty in the village where he was welcomed, is simply a resident and is called in Vili language Nthundji.

==== Habitat ====
One can be surprised that a ciVilization as rich as vili culture cannot leave monuments or ruins, testimony of the events of the distant past. This is to forget that in Loango country, you do not build homes or other sustainable buildings using materials. The traditional cabins were made in panels of Papyrus or Aframomum.

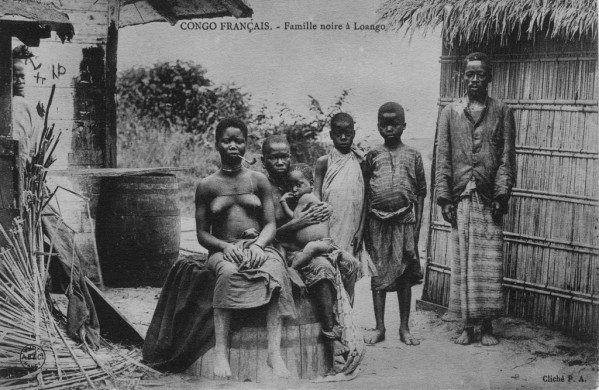
Typical rural and traditional cabin, circa 1910

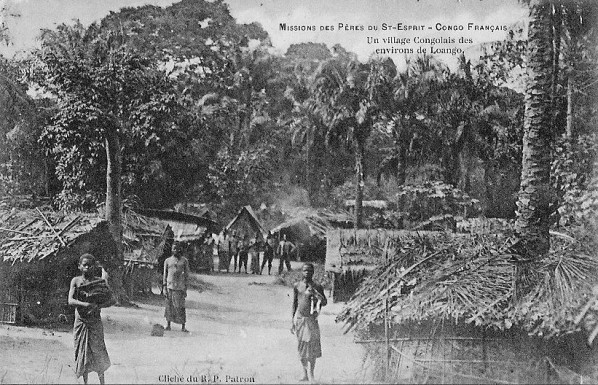
Congolese village around Loango, circa 1910

===== The villages =====
The typology of the villages is indicative of traditional rural life in its historical, socio-cultural and environmental development.

General speaking, the villages are linear and so-called "villages-routes", because of their location along the roads. Habitat within the village is more often split or subdivided in the middle of savannah. However, the habitat becomes more consolidated near sites of the rivers, forests and roads.

At the end of the nineteenth century, Richard Edward Dennett, an English merchant who lived and traded in Vili country note "Fiote, once they have buried a parent, either destroy completely the house of the deceased, or dismantle it to sell the materials to another family ". " The cassava plants or other fruit trees like orange, lemon and mango are planted instead to avoid anyone to settle there. However, things have changed today. Indeed, the death of a loved one always causes abandonment of the home plot. However, it is only rarely destroyed. This allows the family of the deceased to continue to operate, at least temporarily, the food-producting cultures and fruits that are still there, however without to maintain them.

According to beliefs, anyone building a hut with long life materials, is irremediably condemned (death, misfortune, bad spells, fires, diseases...). These beliefs and the fetish so accentuate the fragmentation of the Vili rural landscape, the plots inhabited being continually on the move.

The dispersion and the movement of Vili rural habitat tell us about the individualistic or independent behaviour of Vili people.

The tremendous mango trees and groves across the savannas are the witnesses of this permanent transhumance of villages. Their size (height) give an indication of the age of the village.

This traditional custom may explain why the Vili are so badly housed, fearing by superstition, to be accused of witchcraft in compensation for the construction of a lavish home. This also explains the propensity of the Vili, unlike their neighbors, Yombe, to not be attached to their land.

In addition to the housing cabins (shelters for the night) and the kitchen huts (places of women), the "Moandza" or palaver hut, is the privileged place of meetings, exchanges, rest and craft activities of the males.

At the same time, the modest home of Moe Poaty III (crowned Maloango 18 March 1931 until his death on 3 May 1975), built in 1952 by the colonial administration and which he used as his residential Palace, was abandoned for six years. Indeed, none of these successors wanted to settle there.

Under pressure from the Government, the Royal residence then turned museum that opened, on 10 April 1982, Jean-Baptiste Tati Loutard, Minister of High education and, Minister of culture and arts.

In Pointe-Noire, the second area said illegal out of the ground in the 1950s after the ward "4 Km" is called also "Quartier planches" ("Plank ward"). The Catholic Church of St. Christopher of Mvoumvou, nearby was originally entirely built in white wooden planks. Which sometimes causes the laughingstock of newcomers on Pointe-Noire to the Vili, because they are not aware of this aspect of their culture.

==== Land use planning ====
The town of Pointe-Noire or the Department of Kouilou, the Vili people's settlements still does not have a university, nor other public educational institutions such as high schools, colleges and elementary school. Only private initiatives such as the creation of structures such as École supérieure de technologie du littoral (EST-L), École supérieure de commerce et de gestion, and Université de Loango-Institut supérieur de technologie (UL–IUT), mitigate somewhat this situation.

The Pointe-Noire Grand Market area, the district Number 1 Lumumba and the district Number 2 Mvoumvou, once predominantly inhabited by Vili nationals, have become a preempted sector by Muslim populations, who have come from West Africa, increasingly pushing the Vili to the peripheral districts of the district number 4 Loandjili or 5 Mongo-Poukou. Indeed, impoverishment pushes families to sell their properties to survive.

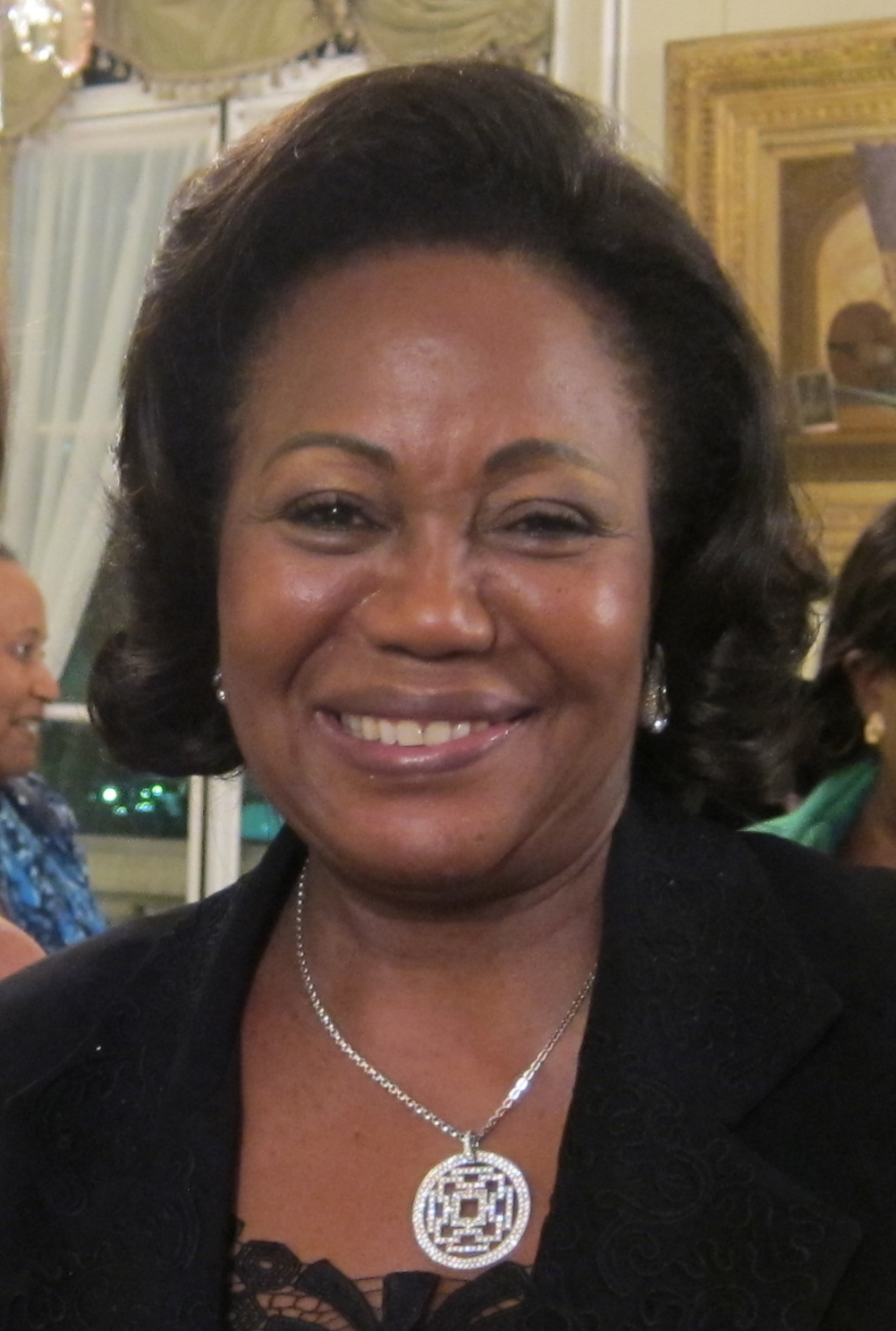
First Lady Antoinette Sassou Nguesso of the Republic of the Congo, 2011

So far there has been tacit approval between the central government and Pointe-Noire and the Department of Kouilou: Most of the mayors of the coastal city have since independence been most often nationals of this region. For example, Stéphane Tchitchéllé, Dr. Jacques Bouiti, Marcel Tchionvo, Jean-Pierre Thysthère Tchicaya, François-Luc Makosso, Roland Bouiti-Viaudo and the current director-Mayor Jean-François Kando (elected since 28 August 2017), are noted. The fact that the first Lady Antoinette Sassou Nguesso born Tchibota originates from Pointe-Noire, militates for this status quo. But how long will this agreement last, which the Vili consider their prerogative as descendants of this fief? Indeed, the economic lung of the Congo, as the gateway to and exiting the flow of goods, arouses increasingly heightened lust.

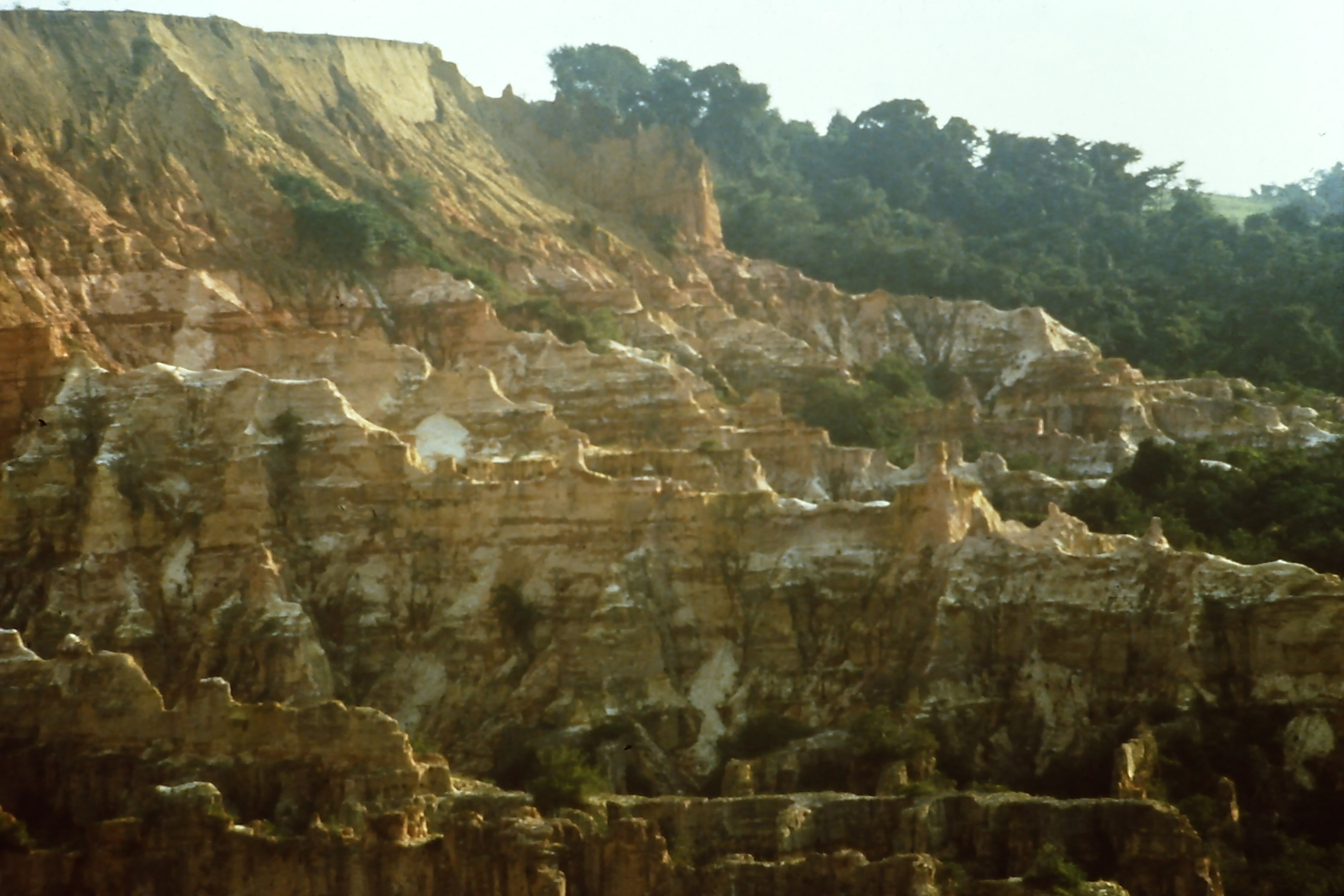
Diosso Gorges – Rock ridges and red rock cliffs, 1983

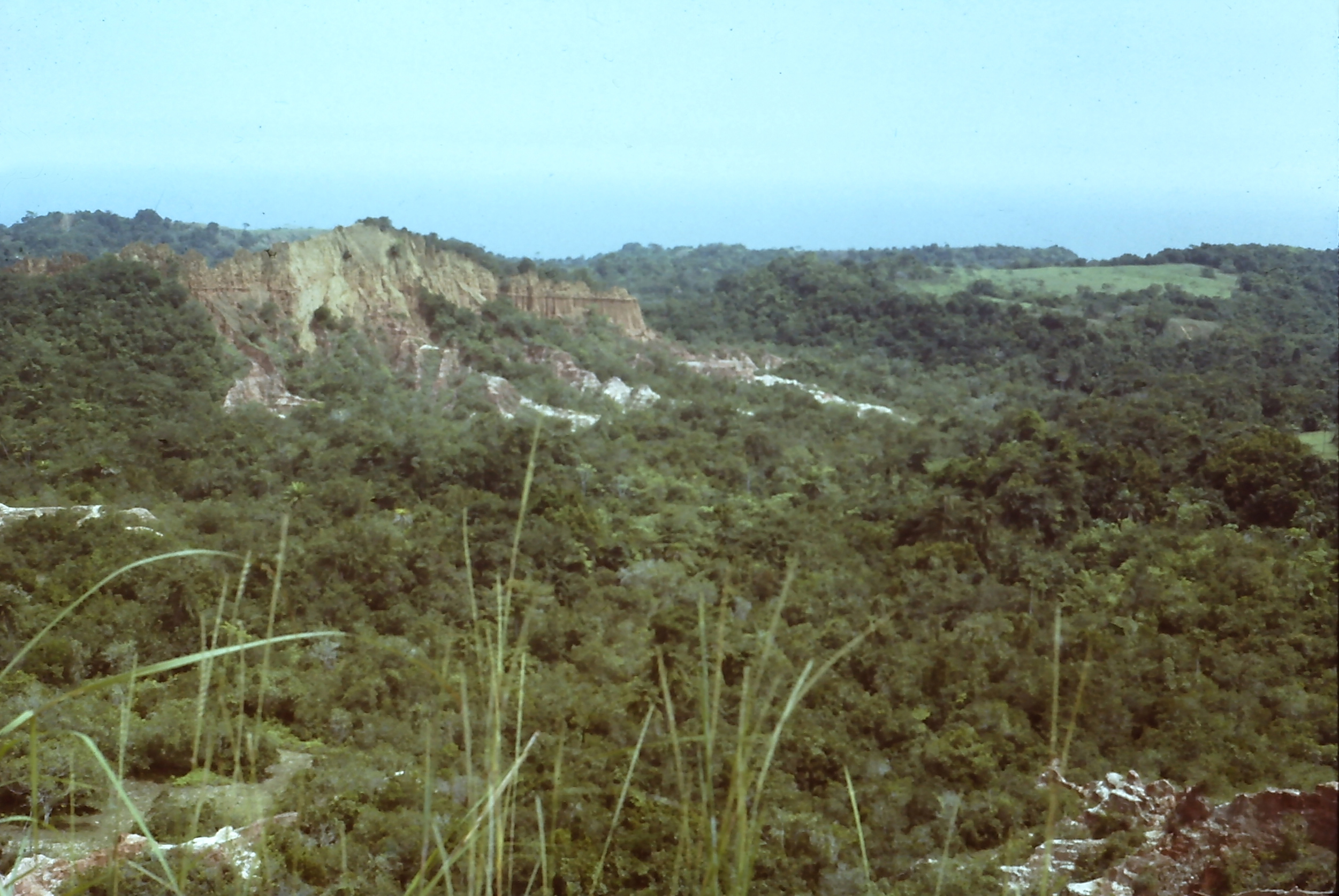
Diosso Gorges and environning rainforest, 1983

In September 1988, the site of Diosso gorges or the "Little Colorado" of Congo as presented by the tourist guides, one of the most beautiful natural sites to visit the country, was planned to receive toxic waste from Europe. The first shipment from Rotterdam, of the million tonnes of contract valued at US$74 million, fortunately never left the Dutch port.

This scandal revealed by the "Green Zorros of Ecology", and relayed by Radio France Internationale broke out publicly four months ago and involves the businessman Luciano Spada and several personalities at the top of the state of the time: Gilbert Bembet, Minister of Information, Ange Edouard Poungui, Prime Minister, Alphonse Poaty-Souchlaty, Minister of Trade and SMEs, Christophe Mbouramoué, Minister of Scientific Research and environment. are also involved in this montage between Bauwerk A. G, a Liechtenstein company, and the Congolese State of civil society personalities such as Vincent Gomez, business lawyer, Jean Passi, adviser to the Prime Minister, and Dieudonné Nganga, Ngamissamy Issanga, Abel Tschicou, administrative authorities.

The scandal aroused incessant rumors and terror among the people of the Kouilou where the waste had to be stored. To calm the situation, the Government committed itself to establishing the responsibilities. The two ministers instigating this fraudulent contract, Christian Gilbert Bembet and Christophe Mbouramoué were dismissed, although having already pocketed the bribes even before the execution of the contract. In addition, lawyer Vincent Gomez was disbarred from the Lawyers bar.

More recently, after feasibility studies in Singapore, the Congo and China have endorsed the construction of a special Economic Zone (SEZ) in the Pointe-Noire region, and more specifically to Loango. This is part of the $60 billion financing plan, granted by Beijing to support the industrialization of African countries. Expropriation operations began to build the future deep-water port in the region of Loango.

The presence of China also adversely affects the natural environment through its industrial fisheries off the Atlantic coast. Indeed, these trawlers destroy the nets of artisan Vili fishermen, residing in the villages located between the district of Tchiamba-Nzassi and the Gabonese border. These fishermen are forced to abandon their activity to fall back on the rural work. As a result, migratory flows to the interior of the land entailing pressure on the forest areas (agricultural activities, wood cutting for coal ...).

The immense industrial plantations of eucalyptus (originally intended to supply a hypothetical pulp mill) produce wood for export. This indigenous species of the Australian continent hinders the diversification of the undergrowth of the Kouilou region, whose soil is already sandy and poor. It follows a decrease in land reserved for agricultural activities. Active or disadvantaged local populations are forced to abandon artisanal activities and to look for salaried jobs in mining companies. The production of charcoal for cooking, agriculture, hunting and gathering to feed these populations that are urbanizing and whose relationship with their original natural environment fades, are not made to reassure the future of the biodiversity of the region.

==== Oil: The curse of the Vili people ====
The eruption of the Kingdom of Loango at the end of the nineteenth century fragmented the oil regions between the Cabinda enclave in Angola, Gabon, Congo-Brazzaville and D.R. Congo. The first oil research began in Gabon, in 1928, at the instigation of Governor General Raphaël Antonetti. In 1931, the oil exploration Mission of AEF (MPPAEF) was created, of which Jacques-Olivier Haas took the direction in 1932. The MPPAEF is replaced in 1934 by the Union of Petroleum Studies and Research (SERP), which becomes, in 1949, the oil Company of AEF (SPAEF), which will eventually merge into the ELF group. The ELF company whose prospections began in the 1960 years, discovers the first offshore oil deposits off Pointe-Noire.

Dr. Jean-Baptiste Tchicaya, a geologist, is one of several of these expeditions. It is at its initiative that almost all oil fields, barges or drilling rigs still in operation or not off Pointe-Noire, bear the names Vili. These are names reminiscent of fish or seafood from the Atlantic Ocean of the Tropics:

- Foukanda
- Kitina
- Kombi: Red Captain fish
- Kouakouala
- Kundji
- Mengo
- Moho Bilondo: literally "The belly filled up with Bilondo" (local sea fish)
- Nkossa: Shrimp
- Lianzi
- Likala
- Likouala: (singular likwal, mukwal or musundi for plural) Herring
- Litchendili
- Likouf: Butterfish
- Mboundi
- Mwafi: Sea Carp
- Sendji: Sardine
- Tchendo: African Bagrid
- Tchibeli Litanzi
- Tchibouela or tchipakoulou pangou: Stingray
- Yanga
- Zatchi

As soon as it was created in 1967, the French company Elf, which became Total thereafter, is immediately above the law and depends on the right line of the Élysée Palace. To compensate for the loss of Algeria, which provided before its independence a quarter of its energy needs, France Gaullist considers as vital and strategic to explore and exploit oil fields in Sub-Saharian Africa. All means are good to achieve this goal.

Former officers of the SDECE (French Secret Services Agency) will be a cohort of private secret Service agents, to effectively ensure the safety of oil installations and men. Colossal financial means (occult commissions, corruption, opaque circuits, etc.) are put into play to finance the operating costs of governments, to intervene in the appointment of senior officials or in the distribution of under the counter payment.

In the western unconscious, Congo remains the quintessential playground for "spooks". After financing the presidential campaign of Pascal Lissouba in 1992, Elf refuses to advance the funds to pay the most immediate public officials and expenditure. Lissouba then turns to the American oil tanker Occidental Petroleum. The relations between the President and Elf will then deteriorate, with the civil Wars of 1993 and 1997 as a climax. Elf prefers to deal with President Denis Sassou Nguesso, a political and pragmatic end, first as soon as he ascended to power on 5 February 1979, then at the end of his coup de force in the Civil War of 1997, thus ending the parenthesis six years after the 1991 national conference.

Thus, Elf did not hesitate to finance and arm the two camps in presence to safeguard its interests.

Pointe-Noire, the economic capital of the Congo, sees hundreds of thousands of refugees coming from the Pool area and the Niari Valley. Successive waves are sometimes anarchy settled by ethnic groups with an obvious risk of igniting on a tribal basis. So far, Pointe-Noire has always been preserved from the political turmoil of which the Congo is the prerogative. Colonel Louis Georges Loembé, Head of Pointe-Noire military zone N°1, and François Auguste Tchichellé Tchivéla, son of Stéphane Tchitchéllé, senior officer and pediatrician, Minister of Tourism and Environment from 1992 to 1995, under Pascal Lissouba rule, prefect of Kouilou Department during the Civil war that broke out in 1997, because they were Military, originating in the region, will ensure that the conflict does not affect the ocean City.

The Congo has important oil reserves but remains one of the poorest countries and one of the most indebted countries in the world per capita, despite the cancellation by international institutions of half of its debt, benefiting in 2010 of the HIPC regime (heavily indebted poor countries). Meanwhile, the oil windfall extracted from Pointe-Noire does not benefit this one. The infrastructure does not follow the rapid evolution of the population of the coastal city. Investment work (access to drinking water, energy, sanitation, management of industrial and domestic waste ...) and maintenance (collection and treatment of waste, pollution, noise and visual nuisances, non-existent ...) are made sparingly. The few subsidies allocated disappear into the meanders of the obscure networks.

===== The oil sands operation =====
Since the years 1970, the beginning of the oil sands operation in the vicinity of the localities of Mboukou, Tchikanou, Loango first by the oil company SPAEF became later ELF, then by Maurel and Prom, and finally by Eni (formerly AGIP research), it could have been expected that the living conditions of the populations improved. It is rather the disillusionment, because no road, nor sanitary and school infrastructure worthy of the name has emerged. These populations whose main activities are fishing, harvesting and agriculture have seen their area of activity polluted by the different boreholes, making their living conditions unbearable. In addition to the decline in agricultural yields (cassava, yams, plantains) that allow Pointe-Noire to be supplied, water points have also been polluted making water unfit for food use. ENI's only solution is to supply water by tanker trucks whose vats are not always curated. Even this distribution is done at the head of the customer by favoring those who have relationships or money.

To carry out this extraction work, peasants have seen their fields destroyed and compensated by ENI in 2009 with a scale dating from 1986. For example, a field of 10 hectares was compensated at a level of 150 000 CFA francs (or approximately EUR 230), a cassava cutting was offset at 37 CFA francs (0.05 euro), one foot of mango tree at 60 000 CFA francs (about 90 euros).

There are also the torchieres of oil sites like that of M'Boundji that produce greenhouse gases and heavy trucks that by transporting equipment (pipelines) raise dust on their way causing diseases Lung.

It all happens as if you want to kill softly local people.

Pierre Stève Loemba, peasant and spokesperson for the communities of Mboukou explains: After many arguments without results, we have entrusted our problem to human rights associations to help us to conquer our right to "A decent life, a healthy environment and fairness."

Brice Makosso, president of the Justice and Peace Commission, believes that "instead of brandishing the decree of 1986, all these companies should instead refer to international standards that are superior to local standards." In Chad or Cameroon, the scales have been revised.

===== Local content =====
The global oil sector has been in crisis and in full mutation since the oil barrel stagnated around US$50 and the demand for black gold is declining sharply. This affects the Congolese economy, which is largely dependent on its oil exports. All the oil majors operating in the country and all their major sub-contractors reduced the sail by returning their cohort of expatriates to the house. Employees with local status have a less-than-shiny spell. Some were thanked overnight without any compensation. Other majors want to reduce the benefits that have been acquired by nationals; What makes the teeth cringe or even causes strikes.

As Paul Boateng, a British politician, stresses, "a crisis presents both problems and opportunities." The opportunity is to be part of the solution: This industry can create well-paid jobs, benefiting both the shareholders and the companies in which it intervenes. To do this, we need to develop local purchasing policies and local content.

Local content or national preference is to "ensure a rebalancing of wealth by inviting States to capitalize on their natural resources". Apart from the taxes and income received by the host States, it is an excellent instrument for the use of local industrial fabric and local competences, not only in the extractive economy sector (hydrocarbons, mines, forest industry), But also in the service and construction sector. So it is a direct impact on the national economy.

The tools available to the public authorities are as follows: imposing the use of local employment; Job creation and transfer of skills; Oblige foreign companies to open their shareholdings to national actors; Demand that they be provided locally in goods and services, in order to densify the Small and medium-sized enterprises network...

At the scale of the village communities that live in the sites operated by these oil majors, they would have to organize themselves into structures capable of serving as interlocutors with the public authorities and the oil companies, for example Train young people to work on these sites or offshore areas, design and implement sustainable development projects to preserve the natural environment and produce (agriculture, fish farming, livestock farming ...) to supply the large Pointe-Noire agglomeration.

The Nigeria inspired by the Norwegian and Brazilian models is the sub-saharan country to have pushed the concept of local content further through the promulgation of the Nigerian content Act in April 2010. This concept is relatively new in Congo with the publication of the new hydrocarbons code in October 2016. As long as it benefits a little to the local communities. One can be doubtfully, since these laws on the local content, have never been followed by a support system so that national staff or national enterprises can confront themselves with their foreign competitors with equal arms.

But as Ines Féviliyé says, the crisis is the opportunity to implement the rules of local content, in information, awareness, dialogue. Indeed, all stakeholders are gaining, by reducing costs for private companies, new markets for local suppliers, transferring technology to develop the domestic industry, jobs, reducing unemployment and of poverty.

The task is certainly not easy, but it is no longer a question of shirking it, given the current situation.

== Societal Structure ==
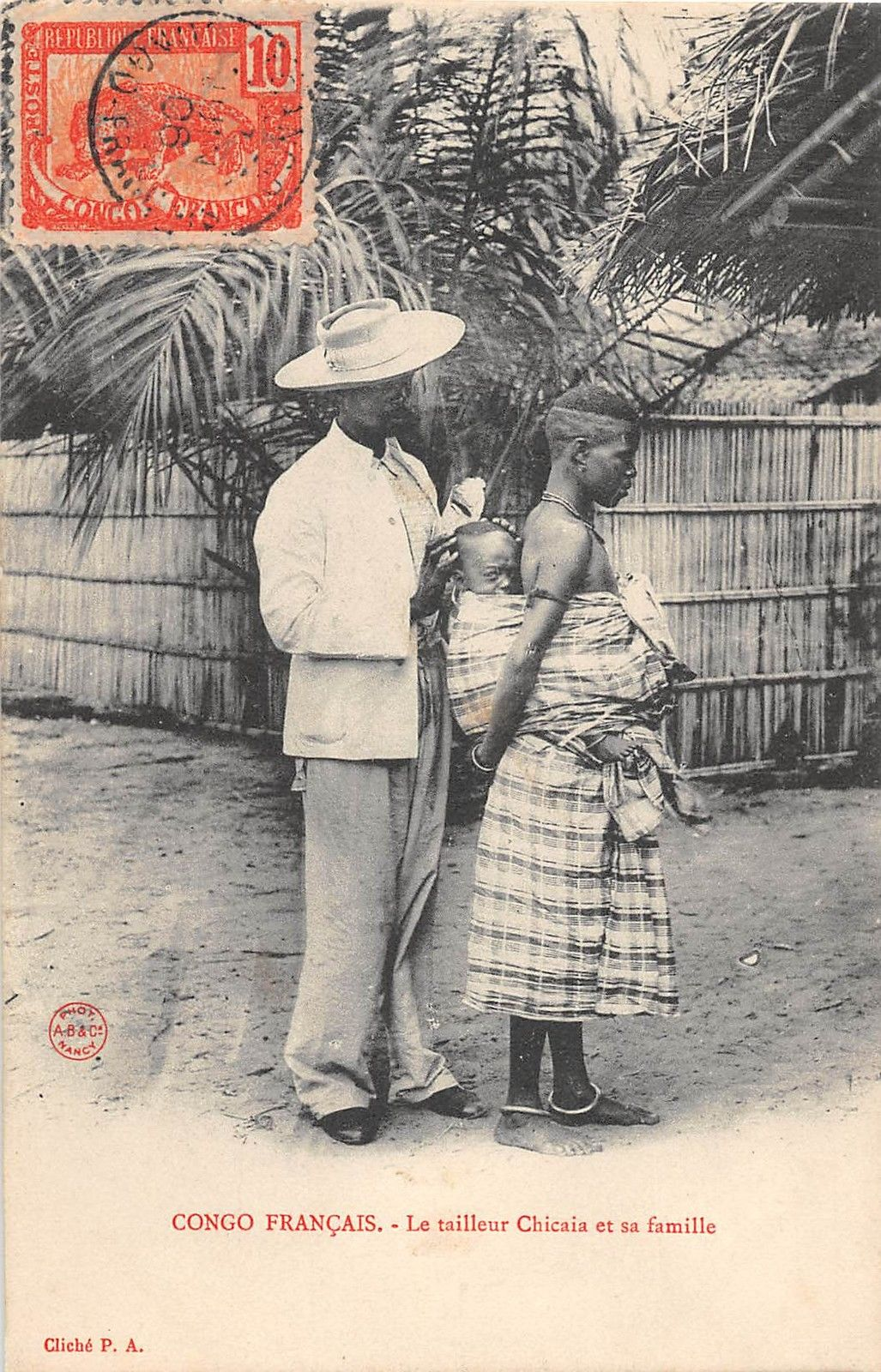
French Congo – Tailor Tchicaya and his family – circa 1900

The Vili traditional society as well as all the ethnic groups of the Kongo group, is characterized by a main structure called Likanda. This is the clan whose members possess in community and in common the goods and interests visible and invisible. Within this matrilineal society, the territory of the clan (si likanda) as well as its limits are managed by the elder of the maternal uncles (ma Nkashi or Fumu si). The word SI in expressions si likanda or Fumu si designates both the land on which the clan is established, but also all the resources therein.

The terms and phrases used to distinguish kinship links are as follows:

- The maternal clan is called Tchifumba, while the paternal clan is called Tchisya.
- Maternal and paternal grandparents are the Nkaaka and grandchildren of the latter are the Ntekulu. Conversely, these call their grandparents by Yaaya.
- The great grandsons are sidandu si Butekulu (literally child following the grandson).
- The nuclear family that can be compared to the Western family is called Liziku, a term literally meaning hearth. This nucleus is composed of bibusi (parent progenitors); Namely Lisya (the Father) and Nguli (the mother), not forgetting baana (children or mwaana in the singular). They are addressed to their parents by calling them respectively by Taata (Daddy) and Maama (Mummy).
- Within the Liziku, the boy is called Mwaana libakala (literally child man), while the girl is Mwaana ntchetu (literally child woman).
- To apply the birthright within the Liziku, the eldest of the children is called Tchibutu, while the elder is called Nkoomba.
- The children call their maternal uncle (the brother of their mother) Ma Nkashi and the wife of their uncle by Cinkaaka. However, they call their maternal aunt Nguli or Maama, term also used to call their mother.
- The nephews are called Bana bu nkashi (literally child of the uncle). The child is placed under the authority of his maternal uncle; which has the right of life or death over its fate. The children of his uncle are called Baana Ba Kwelissi (literally child of the Allied clan or child by covenant) and belong to the clan of the wife of the uncle.
- The paternal uncle ranked Lisya is called Taata in the same way as the parent father. The paternal aunt is called Taata Ntchietu (literally a woman's father). The husband of the latter was called Nkashi (the uncle).

One of the paramount issues in Kongo and Loango economies was the "people power"; it wasn't so much the accumulation of land that was important, but rather human resources, in a region that was not densely populated. To be powerful, a man had to accumulate a large household with both male and female dependents. The aim of marriage contracted is to acquire women, who had both productive and reproductive powers.

== Art ==
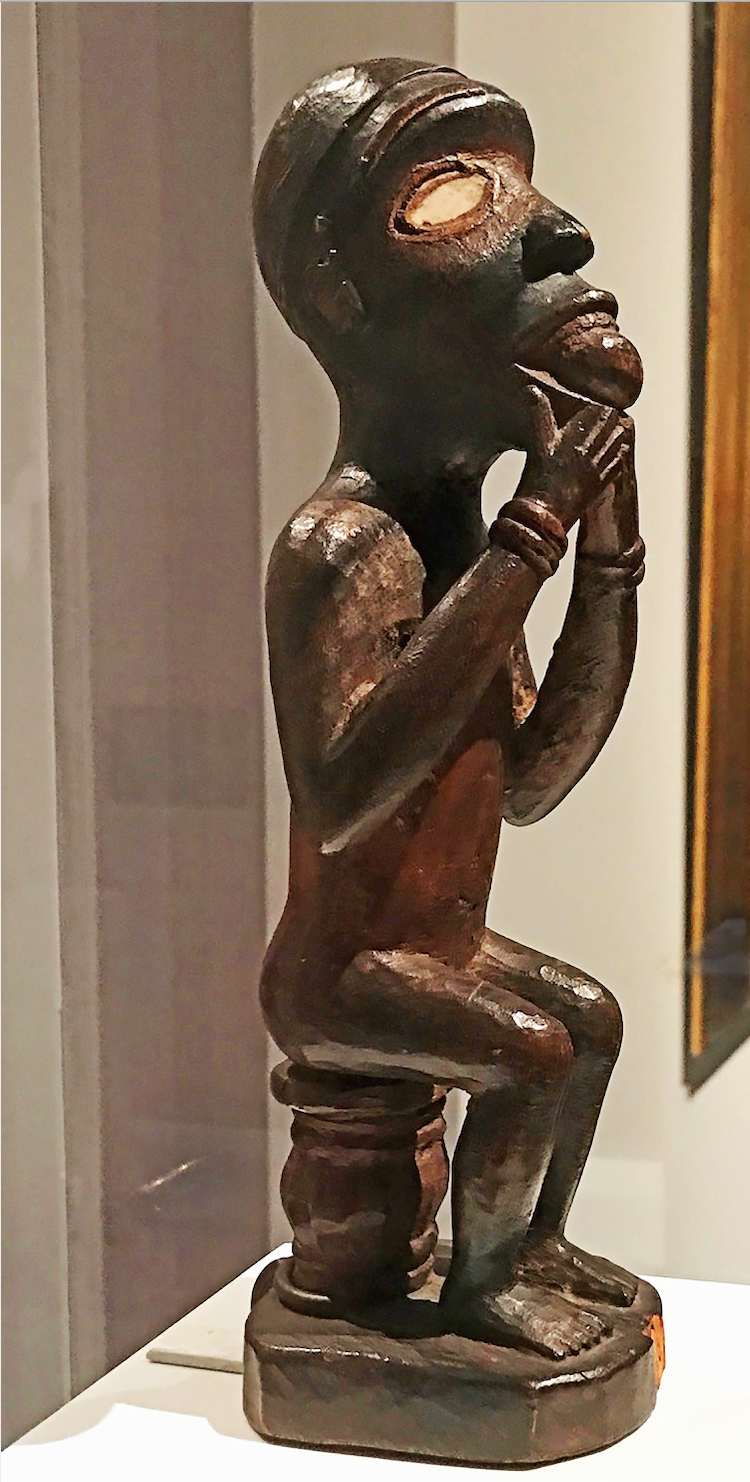
Vili Figure from the Republic of Congo. Late 19th century. Once owned by artist Henri Matisse.

Vili sculptures have been appreciated by important collectors, among these the Paris artist, Henri Matisse, whose Vili figure left a critical impact on Pablo Picasso in his early African period in 1906.

== Surnames ==
When an elder meets a younger stranger, after the greetings, the first asks the second on the name of his clan, then on that of his parents, saying: "Ndjé mwan ' na? " (literally "From whom are you the child? " which can be translated as " What are your origins? "). It's a way to know a little more about who we're dealing with. The youngest describes then more or less succinctly his family tree.

Traditionally and prior to western penetration, members of Liziku, the nuclear family, did not have the same name. For instance, a child could bear the name of a grandparent (N'Luku) or another family member. This becomes the godfather or godmother (N'dusi) of the child. One can also give the surname of a grandparent leaning on the father's.

The name is said Li Zina (Me zina in the plural), while the first name or pseudonym is said to be Nkumbu (Si Nkumbu in plural).

=== Nobility ===
Members of the royal or princely clans are identifiable by the presence of the Mwé or Moé honorary particle in front of the surname. This title of nobility can be translated as "Lord" or "My Lord".

The Ma Loango (king) and his brothers and sisters are Moé. His nephews and nieces (Bana bu nkashi) from her uterine sisters are also.

However, the king's wife (Kame Fumu, or by contraction, Ka fu) and children (Bane Fumu, Mwane fumu in the singular, or by contraction, Mwa fu) are not Moé.

Only the holders of the title of Moé can claim or accede to the throne, because of the matrilineal succession (power derived from the royal blood).

=== Male surnames ===
Below are some surname and their meaning.

Balou (severe; the name of a Portuguese settler Barros very severe) – Bambi/Mbambi (Iguana) – Batchi/Mbatchi (possess me, caught up with me, what belongs to you; of the verb mbak meaning to possess, to catch) – Bilindji – Bouiti (Master) – Boutali – Djembo (struggle with, provoking quarrels) – Djimbi – Gnali – Goma/Ngoma (drum, percussion musical instrument) – Guimbi – Katane (leaves) – Kutana (competing, compete) – Lassy – Lende – Lianzi (name of sea fish, fisherman) – Likounzi/Tchikounzi (Pillar) – Limeka-Linka (the other problem) – Loemba/Loembe (landlord) – Loendo – Louang ' (the little herb that cures) – Loubendou – Louviloukou – Loussiemo (Lightning) – Louzimbou (ingratitude) – Louzingou (Life) – Louzol ' (Love) – Mabiala (Madness, elected, selected) – Makala (Coal/energy) – Makani – Makaya (leaves) – Makosso (plural of likosso; comments, eye drops, solution obtained by mashing by hand unidentified leaves and administered in the nostrils with a funnel made from leaves, arguments) – Malalou – Malassy – Mambou/Liambou/Tchimambou (case (s), amazement, admiration, many) – Mangafou/Mangofo (Minister of Health of the Government of the Kingdom of Loango/Minister of Foreign Affairs and Introducer of Foreigners at the court of the Kingdom of Kakongo-1776) - Manka (other situations) - Mapakou - Matakou (buttock) - Matchiela – Matouti – Mavoungou (plural Muvungu, bedding covers) – Mbouakissi – Mbouyou/Bouyou – Mfoumou/Foumou (chief, leader) – Moutou/Bantou/Tchimoutou (person (s)) – Mpaka/Paka (fence, doubt, uncertainty) – Mpili (Viper) – Munuel (informant) – Ngang Lyel (educated, erudite) – Ngang' Vumba (the one who broods) – Ngô (leopard) – Ngulungu (Pain) – Ngulubu (wild boar) – Nguli Mbwiti (Grand Master, great fetishist) – Niambi (complaint) – Nkali – Nkouanga – Nkoussou (Parrot) – Nkunta/Ntetchi (Basket) – Nombo – Ntenda (sound of rifle shot translated in Tendart) – Nzaou (Elephant) – Nzassi (Lightning) – Nzenze (cricket) – Nziami – Pango/Pangou – Pambou (ability, bell) – Panzou – Pakassa (Buffalo) – Pembello (clean air) – Poati (hold me, live all my being) – Poba – Sakala – Sitou – Souami – Souchlaty (hold me, inhabit my whole being) – Soumbou – Ta Lounga (we were right) – Tam ' Si (deals with the affairs of the country) – Ta Tounga (we have built) – Tati – Tchiama/Untchiama (Rainbow) – Tchibota -Tchicaya (diminutive of Tchikakati; thing from the inside, placenta) – Tchinianga -Tchilala – Tchilimbou (flag, victory, indelible europeanised mark in Sinald) – Tchimbakala (young man) – Tchiloumbou (the day) – Tchingoundou – Tchissafou (safou) – Tchissambou – Tchissina (wealthy) – Tchitembo – Tchivanga – Tchivéla (thunder) – Tchiyembi (poverty) – Téléman (hope, arise) – Viodu/Li Viodu/Viaudo (Sparrow, Unlucky, bad eye).

=== Female surnames ===
Below are some surname and their meaning.

Bossa – Bilongo – Bouhoussou – Boumba (moon halo) – Bwindji – Fotcheko – Foutou – Labline/Bwine – Landou – Lelo – Lembi – Lihaou (it is that) – Li Mani (stone) – Lissahou – Louangou – Losso – Malila – Malonda – Massanga – Matchiela – Mikemo – Mouissou – Mpakou – Mpemba/Pemba (Virginity, Virgin) – Mpouna – Mudeleto – Mulikigni – Ndola – Ndoulou – Ngouamba (famine) – Niandji – Niantou – Niefno (beauty) – Niendo – Ninga – Niong' (Regrets) – Nkambisi/Tchikambsi (mermaid, Mamy Wata, the Genius of Water) – Nsangou – Ntoulou – Nyissi – Nzinga -Simbou (Earth and Ocean) – Socko – Souaka (kou souek – to hide) – Soungou – Tchibinda (proof) – Tchifou -Tchifoumba (family) – Tchilambou – Tchiniongo – Tchingombi/Ngombi – Tchissafou (Safou, Safou tree – dacryodes edulis) – Tchissimbou (something we hold) – Tchitoula (The most beautiful woman of a country) – Toukoula (powder based on Padouk roots) – Volo (Sweet) – Voumbi (mortal remains) – Wola (gold as precious metal) – Yala – Yessa – Zole (Love) – Zouina.

=== Neutral surnames ===
Bouanga / Tchibouanga (weaver, cloth) – Mpopi (Holy) – Panzou – Tchizinga (surround, to have a long life) – Yanzi (angel)

=== First and last name combination ===
The following combinations are often used:

Name	Bouiti	Batchi	Bouanga	Boumba	Loembe	Makaya	Makosso	Mavoungou	Poati	Tchibayi	Tchicaya
First Name	Doosu	Fall / Falla	Manini	Kouamba	Momboukou	Katane	Costode / Kotodi	Bayonne	Soukoulati	Voumbi	Lwangou

=== Consecrated names (Me zina me bisuma) ===
Consecrated names give information on the circumstances of the birth of the children bearing these names.

Futi (born just after the twins, he would present according to tradition excellent skills to succeed) – Nguli Bassa (mother of twins. She enjoys great consideration and great respect within the traditional society) – Nkumba (born after Futi) – Nsafu/Safu (Safou tree or fruit, deciduous teeth on the upper jaw, abnormally growing teeth) – Nsunda (child presented by the sits at his birth and out of the bowels of his mother by the feet and not by the head. It is considered a genius "Nkisi " and would be the twin of Nzinga according to tradition) – Nzinga (surround, to have a long life, born child with umbilical cord around the neck. It is considered a genius "Nkisi " and would be Nsunda's twin according to tradition) – Tchibassa (twin, it requires special attention on the traditional rules).

=== Names related to the beauty of women ===
Mamaye (nkasi bi bamb' – woman married to a European) – Madamasse – Niefno – Malisbète (from Elisabeth) – Fotchika – Tchitoula (the most beautiful woman in a country)

=== Modern names ===
We are currently witnessing a return to authentically Vili first names:

Ata Yiss / Ataïs (Papa comes!) – Bianief (what has succeeded) – Bifani (where is the evil in all that good?) – Binief (The Beauties) – Bimangu (the miracles) – B'Mokine (we watched over him) – Bosso Mweni (whatever the appearance) – Bouelo (The fact of being cristal clear) – Boueni – Bouketchi (Bouketchi ndje yi ntalang', Absolute Trust) – Bussina (Wealth) – Fani (where ?) – Fani Twek (where are we?) – Kefane (He is there, someone matured or handsome) – Kukel (be careful, be vigilant) – Kunief – Liel (intelligence) – Lessika (Shine) – Liam (Mine, my belonging) – Limone (The new one) – Liobakana (what they had planned) – Lisliane – Litati – Litshi (shepherd) – Liyandji (Joy) – Louvoundou (rest) – Lyane / Lyanou (Hope, Hopeness) – Lyoukouna / Lyuk'n (agreement, Harmony) – Manyef – Miniemo (Pride) – Mivek (my solitude, myself, often given to children whose likeness is striking compared to one of the parents) – Mouendou (journey) – Mitché (I say...) – Mwessi (Moonlight) – Naho Lissia (All about the image of the father) – Naïvane (The One I gave) – Naïving (the one I've been waiting for) – Naïzole (the one I loved) – Nandi (it's her, it is him) – Nateliane (brings hope) – Nayilote (it is from him or from her which I have dreamt) – Navek (himself, often given to children Unique) – Nèle (ring) – Nienzi (Joy) – Nkelian (take care) – Nyoundou – Oussing – Sasse Fani – Sisu – Taliane (ku taliann: Have hope, hope) – Tchelika / Tshiélikk (Truth, sincere) – Tchifani – Tchissesse (glow or Divine Light) – Tchivili (Pure language) – Tumsi (future leader) – Um'Wali (the second)) – Untatou (the third) – Unteta (the elder) – Untchi ku sombouka (obstacle) – Vang Si (Weaver) – Van Moul (bring luck; luck Bringer) – Vitchana (let's confirm) – Vitika (accepts) – Wa Nief (you Embellished) – Wisliane – Wol'si (Country rich in gold) – Yaviche (I confirm) / Taviche (we confirmed) – Woyilote (the one I Dreamt) – Tchilifi (head; symbol of power of the chief) – Yoyikane (My Wish)

=== Names of European origin ===
By rubbing shoulders or working as house employees with representatives of the colonial administration, surnames have been incorporated into the Vili terminology. One finds for example:

Demauzer (Strong man, named after weapon German brand name Mauser) – Fayette (Tailor, dressmaker) – Kuizinielo (cook) – Lafadère (from lavadeur, former portuguese word meaning whitener-ancestor of the dry-cleaning-) – Linguissi (translator) – Magnifinelo (sculptor on Ivory) – Sulveyi (supervisor) – Bayonne (colonial administrator from the French city of Bayonne who was said to be a cook, I will take you to Bayonne ) – Mayordome (Butler) – Portella (from the function of a convoy leader to the head of Several porters).

== Vili people ==
- Ballou Canta, Congolese singer-songwriter and producer
- Mambou Aimée Gnali, Female politician and novelist
- Louis Sylvain Goma, Congolese politician
- Zéphirin Lassy, Congolese spiritual and religious leader
- Anatole Collinet Makosso, Prime Minister of the Republic of the Congo
- Antoine Mboumbou Miyakou, Gabonese politician
- N'Gangue M'voumbe Niambi, monarch of the Kingdom of Loango
- Angélique Ngoma, Gabonese politician
- Benjamin Ngoubou, Gabonese politician
- Guillaume Pambou Tchivounda, Gabonese lawyer and academic
- Agathe Pembellot, First congolese female judge
- Moe Poaty I, monarch of the Kingdom of Loango
- Moe Poaty II, monarch of the Kingdom of Loango
- Moe Poaty III, monarch of the Kingdom of Loango
- Antoinette Sassou Nguesso (née Loemba Tchibota), First Lady of the Republic of the Congo
- Jean-Felix Tchicaya Congolese politician
- Jean-Marc Thystère-Tchicaya Congolese politician, son of Jean-Pierre Thystère-Tchicaya
- Jean-Pierre Thystère-Tchicaya Congolese politician
- Tchicaya U Tam'si, Congolese writer, son of Jean-Felix Tchicaya
- Simbou Vili, Congolese singer and artist based in France

== Bibliography ==
- Dello, Jean (2006). Proverbes et contes vili (République du Congo). Paris: L'Harmattan. p. 380. ISBN 978-2-2960-0030-8.
- Dennet, Richard Edward (1887). Seven years among the Fjort:being an English's trader experiences in the Congo district). London: Sampson Low, Marston, Searke & Rivington.
- Olson, James Stuart (1996). "Vili" in The peoples of Africa: An Ethnohistorical Dictionary ). London: Greenwood Publishing Group. pp. 583–584. ISBN 978-0-3132-7918-8.
