= Stanislas Batchi =

His Excellency Stanislas Batchi Boussandji
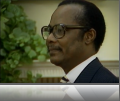
- HE Stanislas Batchi, ambassador from republic of the Congo in United States

The Republic of Congo Ambassador to the United States & United Nations
- In office June 5, 1985 – December 21, 1987
- Preceded by: Nicolas Mondjo
- Succeeded by: Benjamin Bounkoulou

Personal details
- Born: April 21, 1936 Diosso
- Died: April 24, 2003 (aged 67) Pointe Noire
- Party: Congolese Labour Party
- Profession: Teacher, Politician

Stanislas Batchi Boussandji (April 21, 1936 – April 24, 2003) was a politician and the Congolese ambassador to the United States and the United Nations from June 5, 1985 to December 21, 1987.

== Training and professional career ==
Stanislas Batchi is graduated from ENSA in Brazzaville and polyglot. When he returned from France, where he spent his childhood with his godfather, the Member of Parliament Jean-Félix Tchicaya, he began his professional career with the role of railroader of the Congo Ocean Railway. He later turned to teaching.

Stanislas Batchi will perform in the northern Congo in Makoua, Kéllé. or Divénié. Back in Brazzaville, after an exam, he teaches in colleges and high schools.

Two years after the socialist revolution of the three glorious (13, 14 and 15 August 1963), which leads to the fall of the regime of Fubert Youlou, the Congolese government decides to nationalize the teaching. The Lycée Chaminade, property of the Congregation of Marianist Sisters, is now called lycée Drapeau Rouge ("Red Flag"). At the beginning of the 1966-1967 school year, Stanislas Batchi became principal of this high school and replaced Jean-Pierre Thystère Tchicaya in this position. It introduces the duty to wear uniforms for girls and boys, so that all students are on the same level.

== Political career ==
Following the seizure of power by the progressive military led by Marien Ngouabi in December 1968, a revolutionary Court of Justice was set up. It had aims to judge those responsible for the disturbances affecting public order and the internal security of the state since 15 August 1963. Stanislas Batchi, says the "red prosecutor" becomes president of the People's Court. He finishes his career as Prefect of the city of Pointe-Noire.

== Diplomatic career ==
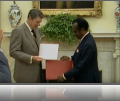
His excellency Stanislas Batchi Busanzi, ambassador from Republic of the Congo in USA présenting credentials letters to president Ronald Reagan in November 1985

Stanislas Batchi was Ambassador Extraordinary and Plenipotentiary, notably in the USSR in 1968, in Algeria in 1970 and in the United States and United Nations from 1985 to 1987.

== Tributes ==
A street bears the name of Stanislas Batchi in the district of Tchibamba in the arrondissement 1 Lumumba of Pointe-Noire.

== See also ==
- List of ambassadors of the Republic of the Congo to the United States
- Republic of the Congo–United States relations
- Vili people
