= Makabana =

- Location in the Republic of the Congo
- Coordinates: 3°29′0″S 12°36′24″E
- Country: Republic of the Congo
- Department: Niari
- District: Makabana

Population (2023)
  - Total: 7,347

Makabana is a small town in the south of the Republic of the Congo. It is the seat of the Makabana District in the Niari Department.

== Transportation ==
Makabana is served by a station on the national railway network and by Makabana Airport.

== See also ==
- Railway stations in Congo
