= FCPA =

FCPA may refer to:

- Fairfax County Park Authority
- Fellow of the Society of Certified Practicing Accountants
- Foreign Corrupt Practices Act
- Makabana Airport, in the Republic of the Congo, which has that ICAO airport code
