= Banda District =

Banda District may refer to:

- Banda District, India, a district in Uttar Pradesh, India
- Banda District, Ghana, a district in the Bono Region, Ghana
- Banda District (Republic of the Congo), a district in the Niari Department, Republic of the Congo
