= Agathe Pembellot =

Congolese judge (1942–2016)

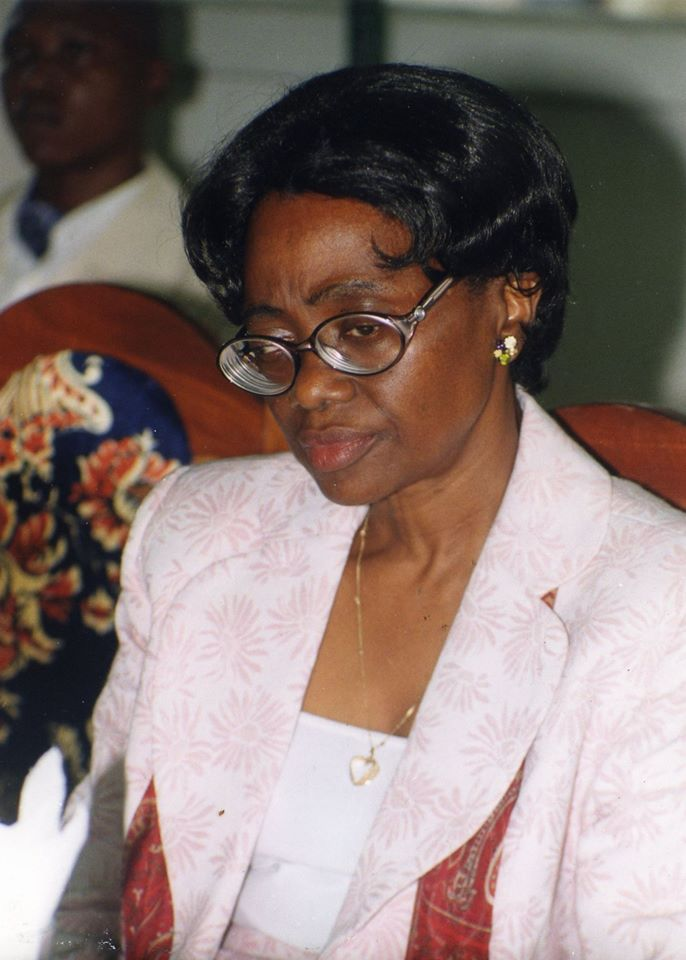
- Agathe Pembellot at Brazzaville in 2002
- Born: Agathe Lélo Félicie Pembellot; 21 May 1942; Pointe-Noire, Congo
- Died: 13 October 2016 (aged 74); Pointe-Noire, Congo
- Occupation: Former member of Congolese Supreme Court
- Years active: 1972-2007
- Known for: Defense of childhood

Agathe Félicie Lélo Pembellot (21 May 1942 – 13 October 2016) was the first female judge of Republic of the Congo Brazzaville. She has held several positions in the Senior Congolese Judiciary.

== Biography ==
Agathe Pembellot, from Republic of Congo, was born on 21 May 1942 in Pointe-Noire, capital of Moyen-Congo, by then. She is the second youngest of nine children, founded by Anaclet Pembellot (1908, Tandou Mboulou - 2003, Pointe-Noire), attendant to the national telephone company; member of the clan Princely House of the Boulolo of Vista. (Loango) and by Anna Bouiti (1920, Brazzaville - 2004, Pointe-Noire), farmer of clan Tchiali and eldest daughter of six children Bouiti.

Agathe Pembellot's maternal grandparents are Jacques Bouiti I (1895, Diosso - 1958, Pointe-Noire), master-tailor and, dedicated dresser of the staff of CFCO (Chemin de Fer du Congo Océan) - the national railway company - and Eugénie Soungou Makaya (1901, Diosso - 1985, Diosso). Her paternal grandparents are Thomas Pembellot (1883, Sao Tome - ?), a translator and a master-tailor and Lélo Koutana (? - ?).

The Boulolos and Tchialis, are part of the twenty-seven primordial clans of the former Kingdom of Loango. Nowadays, one of the very populous neighborhoods of the district n°4 Loandjili of Pointe-Noire, the economic capital of Republic of Congo, still bears the name of Tchiali, because they were former landowners.

Agathe Pembellot has been married to Auguste Mambou (1941, Pointe-Noire - 2015, Pointe-Noire), former national deputy director and former regional director of customs and excises, with whom she had five children.

== Educational background ==
Agathe Pembellot attended the urban school of young girls from Pointe-Noire (managed by the religious congregation of the Daughters of the Holy Spirit) (Holy-Spirit daughters,) she left in 1956. She began High School at Victor Augagneur in Pointe-Noire, where she will be the first Congolese Bachelor of this school in 1965. This naturally opens the doors to the Centre d'enseignement supérieur de Brazzaville (C.E.S.B.), where she met her future husband, also a law student.

Holder of her first degree in law of C.E.S.B. in 1967, Agathe Pembellot was married in August 1968 and accompanied her husband to France, at the end of his third year of licence. She attended the fourth year at Faculté de droit et des sciences économiques de Paris (Panthéon-Sorbonne). She passed her Law degree in 1969 and attended her professional training at Centre national d’etudes judiciaires de Paris until April 1970. The same year, she was sworn as a magistrate at the Paris Palace of Justice. She then performed an internship at the District Court in Melun, where she was particularly interested in the problems of juvenile delinquency

== Judicial career ==
Once her graduation studies were completed, Pembellot returned to her country Congo, in order to make up for the still insufficient number of executives at that time.

March 11, 1973, the grounds of the Palace of Justice in Brazzaville were home to a ceremony that brought her to the elite of the judiciary. As a matter of fact, Agathe Pembellot, 30 years old, had sworn to become the first female Congolese judge. Other Congolese women lawmakers include: Pauline Yoba born Djembo, Jocelyne Milandou (Vice-President of the Court of Auditors and budgetary discipline), Henriette Diatoulou, Maître Danielle Babin (lawyer at the Court of Appeal of Paris and former member of Council of the College of lawyers of Brazzaville in Congo), Nadia Josiane Laure Macosso, Sylvie Tchignoumba, Virginie N'dessabeka, Bertille Djembo Pemba, Caddy Elisabeth Ndala, Arlette Malonga, Marie Miboula Ngatséké et Dorothée Mana.

Agathe Pembellot is as pioneer in the Congolese Judiciary as the judge for children. As such, in collaboration with social services, she strives to find solutions to the problems of childhood.

She had also worked in the reintegration of prisoners in civil society, once served their sentence, and this, regardless of the severity of the crime or the punishment of an inmate.

She has held the following responsibility positions in the senior Congolese public service:

- president of the Brazzaville juvenile court;
- president of the regional court of Brazzaville;
- president of the Court of appeal for Brazzaville in 1976;
- member of the supreme Court in 1982, first woman admitted within Congo's highest judicial body;
- president of the social Chamber of the Supreme Court until 1993;
- deputy General Inspector of courts and judicial services of the Ministry of Justice;
- lecturer at the National school of administration and magistracy (ENAM) of Brazzaville.

During her career, Agathe Pembellot has worked with illustrious counterparts, essentially male such as Charles Assemekang (1926, Souanké - ?) former president of the Congo Supreme Court; Placide Lenga, retired General Attorney and former first President of the Supreme Court; Isaac Locko, former member of the Supreme Court; Louis Zoubabéla (1944, Mbanza-Ndounga - 2009, Paris), politician and former member of the Supreme Court; Patrice Nzouala (? - 2003)^{,} former Dean of co-investigating judges, Jean-François Tchibinda Kouangou (1943, Mpoumbou) former magistrate and former Minister of Justice and Keeper of the Seals, Gaston Mabouana, former General Inspector of Courts and Judicial Services of the Ministry of Justice and Alexis Gabou (1936, Brazzaville) former magistrate and politician.

Agathe Pembellot's career was entirely spent in the political capital Brazzaville. She retired in 2007.

== Achievements ==
Mambou-Pembellot, Agathe 1985 « La preuve des crimes de sorcellerie devant le juge pénal congolais », Revue juridique et politique, 1-2 (janvier-mars) : p. 124-128.

== Member of the following organizations ==
Agathe Pembellot has been affiliated to the following organizations:

- former treasurer of the Congolese section of the IDEF (International institute of Law of the French inspiration);
- member of IFWLC (International Federation of Women in Legal Careers) / FIFCJ (Fédération Internationale des Femmes des Carrières Juridiques);
- association of women lawyers of Congo (AFJC).
- chairman of the national committee on childhood;

== See also ==
- First women lawyers around the world
- List of first women lawyers and judges in Africa
