= Londéla–Kayes District =

Londéla–Kayes
- District
- Interactive map of Londéla–Kayes
- Country: Republic of the Congo
- Region: Niari Department

Area
  - Total: 259.2 sq mi (671.3 km^{2})

Population (2023 census)
  - Total: 10,108
  - Density: 39.00/sq mi (15.06/km^{2})
- Time zone: UTC+1 (GMT +1)

Londéla–Kayes is a district in the Niari Department of Republic of the Congo.
