= Yaya District (Republic of the Congo) =

Yaya
- District
- Interactive map of Yaya
- Country: Republic of the Congo
- Region: Niari Department

Area
  - Total: 505 sq mi (1,308 km^{2})

Population (2023 census)
  - Total: 3,213
  - Density: 6.362/sq mi (2.456/km^{2})
- Time zone: UTC+1 (GMT +1)

Yaya is a district in the Niari Department of Republic of the Congo.
