= Moungoundou-nord District =

Moungoundou-nord
- District
- Interactive map of Moungoundou-nord
- Country: Republic of the Congo
- Region: Niari Department

Area
  - Total: 350.7 sq mi (908.2 km^{2})

Population (2023 census)
  - Total: 1,845
  - Density: 5.262/sq mi (2.031/km^{2})
- Time zone: UTC+1 (GMT +1)

Moungoundou-nord (can also be written as Mungundu-nord) is a district in the Niari Department of Republic of the Congo.
