= Nyanga District (Republic of the Congo) =

Nyanga
- District
- Interactive map of Nyanga
- Country: Republic of the Congo
- Region: Niari Department

Area
  - Total: 1,125 sq mi (2,915 km^{2})

Population (2023 census)
  - Total: 6,642
  - Density: 5.901/sq mi (2.279/km^{2})
- Time zone: UTC+1 (GMT +1)

Nyanga is a district in the Niari Department of Republic of the Congo.
