= Divénié =

- Location in the Republic of the Congo
- Coordinates: 2°42′26″S 12°1′40″E
- Country: Republic of the Congo
- Department: Niari
- District: Divénié
- Elevation: 750 ft (230 m)

Divénié is a town and capital of Divénié District in the Niari Department of the Republic of the Congo.

Founded in the late 19th century, the town has a colonial brick church built in 1899. However, it is in very poor condition due to lack of maintenance.

Jean-Jules Koukou, the Congolese actor, author, and theater director, is from Divénié.
