= Divénié District =

Coordinates: 2.623°S 12.053°E

Divénié
- District
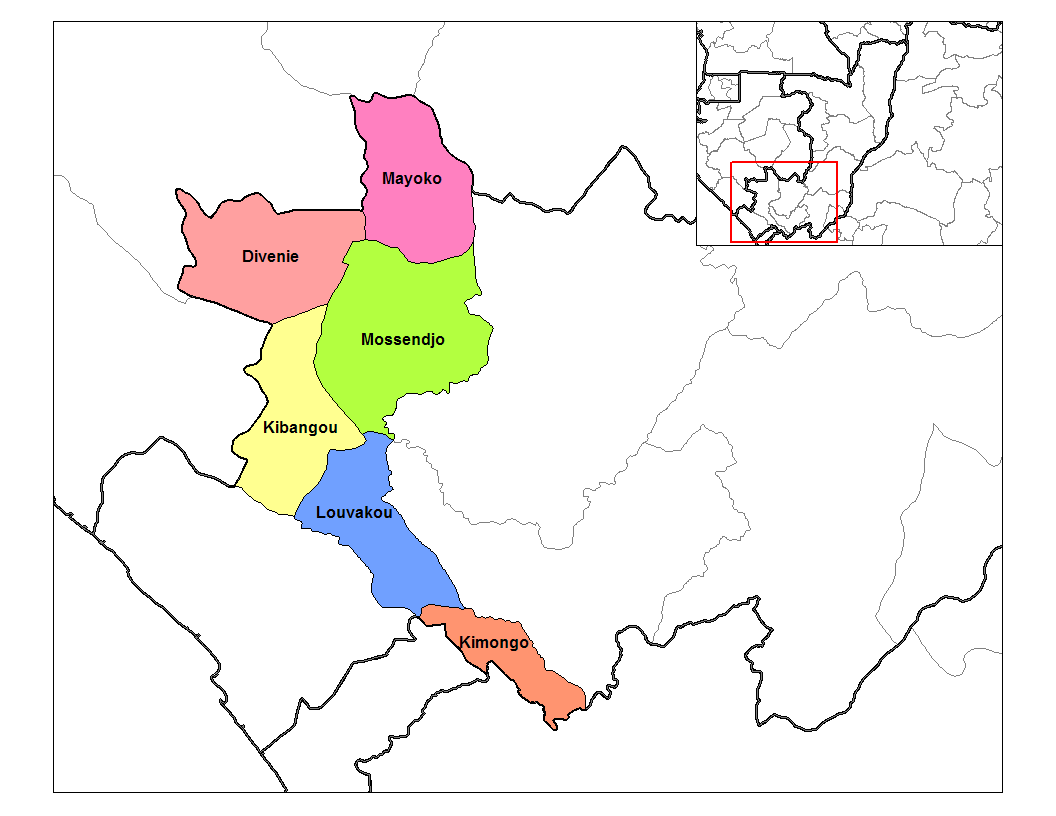
- Divénié District in the region
- Country: Republic of the Congo
- Region: Niari Region

Area
  - Total: 1,006 sq mi (2,606 km^{2})

Population (2023 census)
  - Total: 12,268
  - Density: 12.19/sq mi (4.708/km^{2})
- Time zone: UTC+1 (GMT +1)

Divénié District is a district in the Niari Region of south-western Republic of the Congo. The capital lies at Divénié.
