= Makabana Airport =

- IATA: KMK; ICAO: FCPA

Summary
- Serves: Makabana, Republic of the Congo
- Elevation AMSL: 495 ft / 151 m
- Coordinates: 3°28′50″S 12°35′55″E

Map
- Location in the Republic of the Congo

Runways
Direction	Length		Surface
Direction	m	ft	Surface
07/25	1,350	4,429	Dirt
- Source: GCM Google Maps

Makabana Airport (IATA: KMK, ICAO: FCPA) is an airstrip serving the village of Makabana in the Niari Department, Republic of the Congo. The runway is 2 kilometres (1.2 mi) southwest of the village.

The Makabana non-directional beacon (Ident: MK) is 1.7 nautical miles (3.1 km) east-northeast of the runway.

== See also ==
- List of airports in the Republic of the Congo
- Transport in the Republic of the Congo
