= Moungoundou-sud District =

Moungoundou-sud
- District
- Interactive map of Moungoundou-sud
- Country: Republic of the Congo
- Region: Niari Department

Area
  - Total: 440 sq mi (1,140 km^{2})

Population (2023 census)
  - Total: 4,710
  - Density: 10.7/sq mi (4.13/km^{2})
- Time zone: UTC+1 (GMT +1)

Moungoundou-sud (can also be written as Mungundu-sud) is a district in the Niari Department of Republic of the Congo.
