= Banda District (Republic of the Congo) =

Banda
- District
- Location within Republic of the Congo
- Coordinates: 4.683611°S 13.433611°E
- Country: Republic of the Congo
- Region: Niari Department

Area
  - Total: 839 sq mi (2,174 km^{2})

Population (2023 census)
  - Total: 7,403
  - Density: 8.820/sq mi (3.405/km^{2})
- Time zone: UTC+1 (GMT +1)

Banda is a district in the Niari Department of Republic of the Congo.
