= Makabana District =

Makabana
- District
- Interactive map of Makabana
- Country: Republic of the Congo
- Region: Niari Department

Area
  - Total: 258.7 sq mi (670.1 km^{2})

Population (2023 census)
  - Total: 11,436
  - Density: 44.20/sq mi (17.07/km^{2})
- Time zone: UTC+1 (GMT +1)

Makabana is a district in the Niari Department of Republic of the Congo.
