= Loandjili =

Coordinates: 4.7561°S 11.8577°E

Loandjili (Lo-anh-ji-li), also known as Louantili, is one of the arrondissements of the city of Pointe-Noire in the Republic of the Congo. Its population is approximately 23,000.
