= Diosso =

- Location in the Republic of the Congo
- Coordinates: 4°37′44″S 11°50′56″E
- Country: Republic of the Congo
- Department: Kouilou
- District: Loango

Diosso is a town in the Republic of Congo, lying about 25 kilometres north of Pointe-Noire in the Kouilou Department along National Highway 5. It was the capital of the Loango Kingdom and is home to its rulers' mausoleum. Roman Catholic missionaries were active in Diosso, which had a royal palace.

== Landmarks ==
=== Diosso Gorge ===
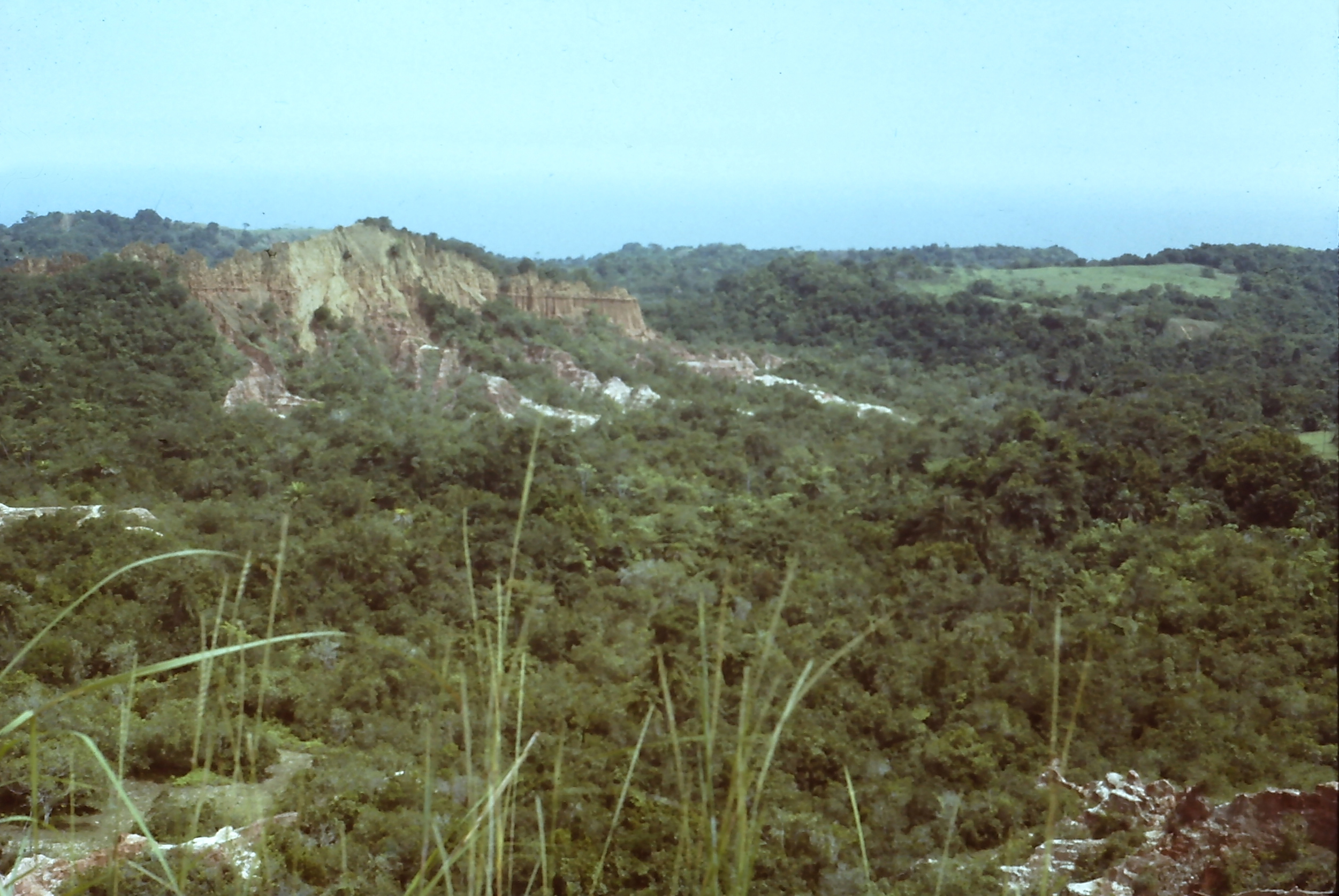
Diosso Gorge, 1983.

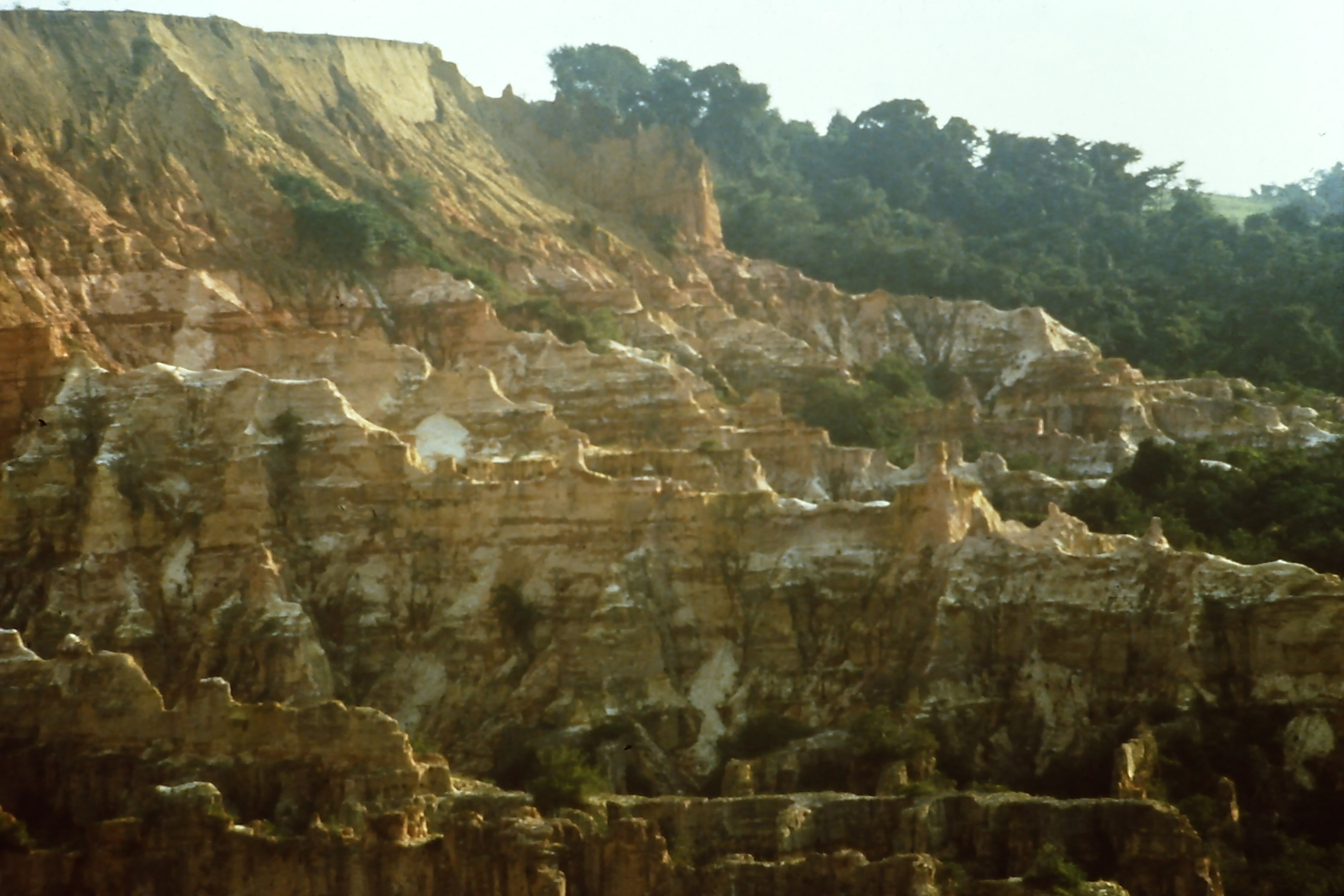
Les gorges de Diosso.

Erosion in the area has created the nearby Diosso Gorge, known as the "Grand Canyon of the Congo". It has also been called the Diosso Amphitheater. Within the gorge's rainforest, there are rock ridges and distinctive red rock cliffs, which can reach up to 165 feet (50 m) in height. The New York Times described Diosso Gorge as "a stunning gorge of plunging, pink cliffs draped with green Central African jungle." According to reports, Gamissamy Issanga, the director of environment at the Congo's research ministry, once approved the dumping of 1 million tonnes of oil, acids and solvents in the gorge. The gorge is said to be inhabited by the female spirit of Mboma, who takes the form of a snake.

=== Tchimpounga Chimpanzee Rehabilitation Center ===
The Tchimpounga Chimpanzee Rehabilitation Center (formerly the Tchimpounga Chimpanzee Sanctuary), established in 1992 to protect orphaned chimpanzees, is nearby. Built by the Conoco petroleum company for JGI, Tchimpounga is reputedly the largest chimpanzee sanctuary on the African continent, treating some 125 apes.

=== Mâ-Loango Regional Museum ===
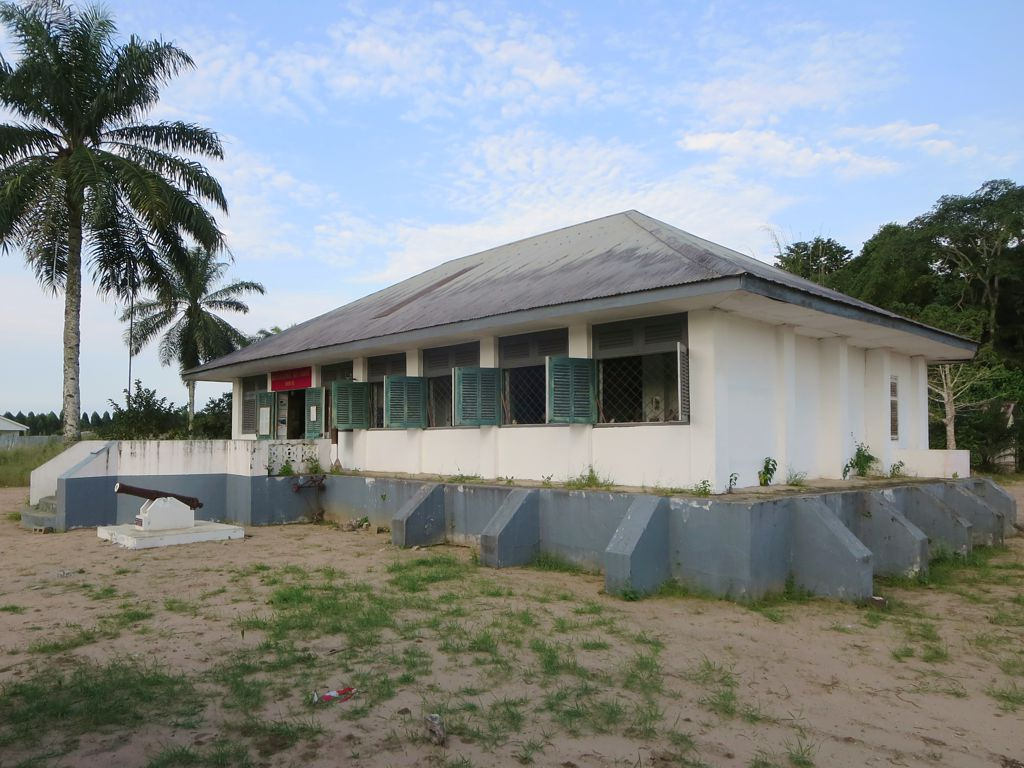
Ma-Loango Regional Museum

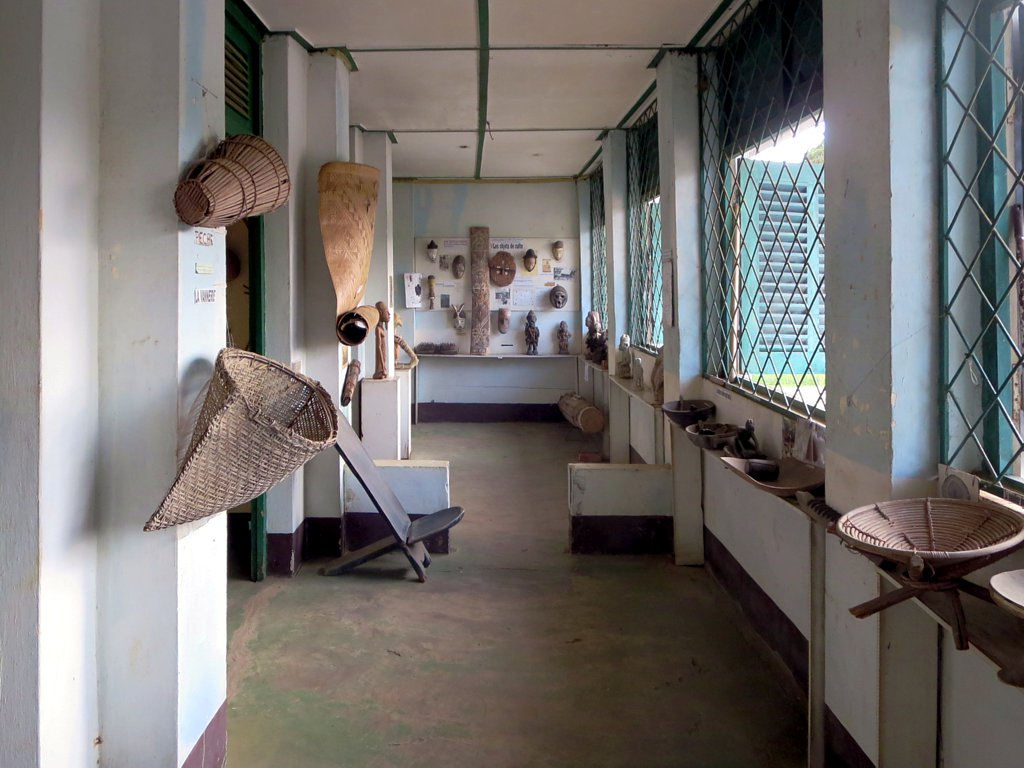
Ma-Loango Regional Museum Exhibits

Founded in 1982, the ethnography and history of the Loango Kingdom is displayed in the Mâ-Loango Regional Museum, located in Diosso. The museum is a public institution and, as a regional branch, was founded with the aim of protecting cultural heritage. It collects and exhibits objects that are of historical, archaeological, ethnographic and artistic significance, and is situated in a palace that was inhabited by Ma Moe Loango Poaty III, king (1931-1975) of the kingdom of Loango. The museum is 20 metres (66 ft) long by 11 metres (36 ft) wide and contains rooms, hallways, bedrooms, and the king's bathroom. All these rooms have either been transformed into exhibition rooms or are in reserve.

There are over 300 exhibits and documents, as well as a dozen different collections, illustrating historical events and documents that show the evolution of Congolese society. Objects of great artistic value are displayed alongside simpler objects relating to everyday life that are considered important in the study of ancient Congolese people. Traditional work tools include hoes, axes, knives, wooden bellows, gourds, and adzes. Jewelry and traditional clothing include loincloths, headdresses, and the Tchikumbi costume. Domestic items are characterized by a rush mat, as well as straw and kitchen utensils. Weapons and traps include spears, knives, crossbows, hunting wooden bells, hunting wicker traps, and nets. Traditional objects of worship include stone statuettes, Punu mask, the Kidumu mask, as well as the Kebe Kebe and Mboumba figurines. Traditional musical instruments are the Yombe and Dondo.

== Sport ==
The town's golf club overlooks the coast. https://web.archive.org/web/20160410060229/https://sites.google.com/site/diossogolfclub/
