= Niari Department =

Department of the Republic of the Congo

Coordinates: 4°12′S 12°40′E

Niari Niadi
- Department
- Niari, department of the Republic of the Congo
- Country: Republic of the Congo
- Capital: Dolisie

Area
  - Total: 25,942 km^{2} (10,016 sq mi)

Population (2023 census)
  - Total: 334,863
  - Density: 12.908/km^{2} (33.432/sq mi)
- HDI (2018): 0.567 medium · 4th of 12

Niari (can also be written as Niadi) is a department of the Republic of the Congo in the western part of the country. It borders the departments of Bouenza, Kouilou, and Lékoumou, and internationally, Gabon, the Democratic Republic of the Congo, and the Cabinda portion of Angola. The regional capital is Dolisie.

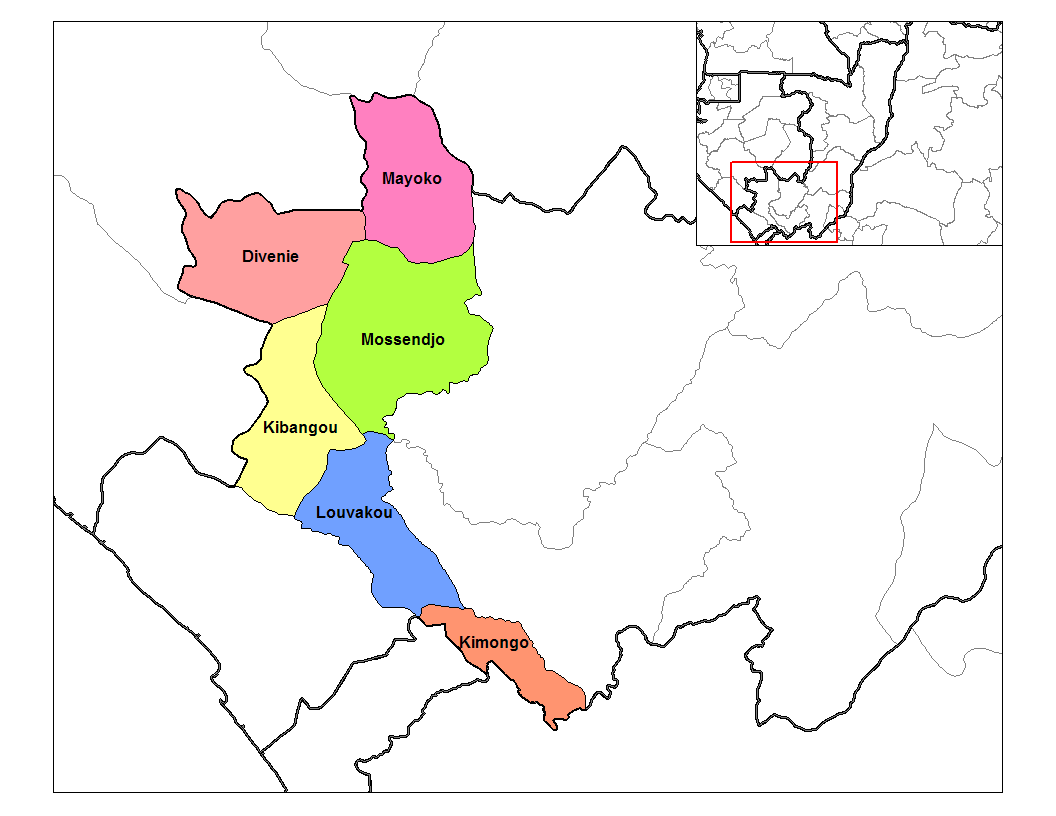
Until 2012 Niari had only six districts

== Administrative divisions ==
According to an administrational reorganisation of 2012, Niari Department is divided into fourteen districts and two communes not belonging to any district:

=== Districts ===
1. Louvakou District
2. Kibangou District
3. Divénié District
4. Mayoko District
5. Kimongo District
6. Moutamba District
7. Banda District
8. Londéla–Kayes District
9. Makabana District
10. Mbinda District
11. Moungoundou-Sud District
12. Nyanga District
13. Moungoundou-Nord District
14. Yaya District

=== Communes ===
1. Dolisie
2. Mossendjo
