= Congo-Oubangui Department =

Department of the Republic of the Congo

Congo-Oubangui
- Department
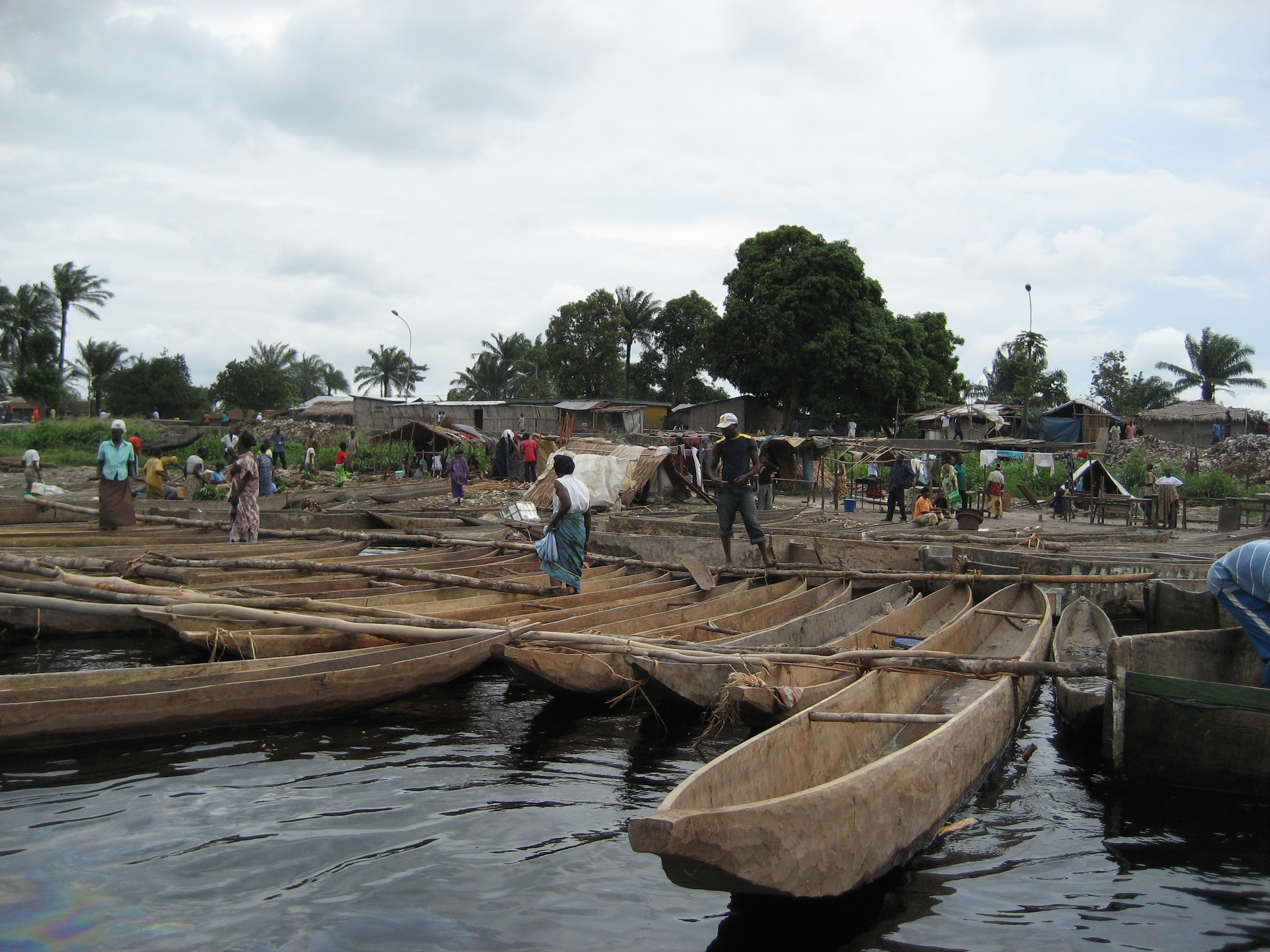
- Pirogues on the waterfront at Mossaka, capital of Congo-Oubangui
- Interactive map of Congo-Oubangui
- Coordinates: 1°S 17°E
- Country: Republic of the Congo
- Established: 8 October 2024
- Capital: Mossaka

Government
  - Prefect: Habib Gildas Obambi Oko

Area (Note: Calculated by summing the areas of the districts of Bokoma, Liranga, Loukoléla, and Mossaka as determined by geospatial data.)
  - Total: 25,536 km^{2} (9,860 sq mi)

Population (May 2023) (Note: Calculated by summing the populations of the districts of Bokoma, Liranga, Loukoléla, and Mossaka as of the 2023 Congolese census.)
  - Total: 124,010
  - Density: 4.8563/km^{2} (12.578/sq mi)
- Time zone: UTC+1 (WAT)

Congo-Oubangui is a department of the Republic of the Congo. It was created on 8 October 2024 from the eastern part of Cuvette Department and the southern part of Likouala Department. Its capital is Mossaka. It is located on the north shore of the confluence of the Congo and Ubangi rivers, and named after them.

== Geography and climate ==
Congo-Oubangui borders the departments of Likouala to the north, Sangha to the northwest, and Cuvette to the west. The Congo and Ubangi rivers form its southern and eastern borders respectively: on the other side of these rivers is the province of Équateur of the Democratic Republic of the Congo.

Congo-Oubangui is located in the Cuvette Centrale, the central depression of the Congo Basin. A part of the Western Congolian swamp forests ecoregion, the department has an average elevation of about 300 m (980 ft), and is covered by forests that are seasonally flooded to a depth of 0.5 to 1 m (20 to 39 in). The tributaries of the Congo in this area are fed by groundwater as well as rainwater, and wells at Mossaka, Loukoléla and Liranga have water even during the dry season.

The entire department lies within the Grands Affluents Ramsar site established in 2007. In 2017, Grands Affluents was designated together with Lake Tele in Likouala Department and Ngiri-Tumba-Maindombe in the Democratic Republic of the Congo as a transboundary Ramsar site, the largest such site in the world.

Congo-Oubangui experiences a sub-equatorial climate with an average temperature of around 24 °C (75 °F). Annual rainfall ranges from 1,200 to 2,000 mm (47 to 79 in). The rainy season runs from September to May with a small reduction in rain from January to February, while the dry season runs from June to September.

== History ==
In 1997, over fifteen thousand Rwandan refugees fleeing the First Congo War settled in camps established at Loukoléla, Liranga, and Ndjoundou.

On 8 October 2024, Congo's National Assembly approved the creation of three new departments: Congo-Oubangui, Djoué-Léfini, and Nkéni-Alima. Congo-Oubangui was formed from the districts of Bokoma, Loukoléla, and Mossaka in the eastern part of Cuvette Department, and Liranga District, the southernmost district in Likouala Department.

== Administration ==
Congo-Oubangui is divided into the four districts of Bokoma, Liranga, Loukoléla, and Mossaka. The districts of Loukoléla and Mossaka each contain an urban community (communauté urbaine) of the same name.

The first prefect of Congo-Oubangui is Habib Gildas Obambi Oko, who was appointed in April 2025.

== Demographics ==
The territories that now belong to Congo-Oubangui reported a combined population of 124,010 in the 2023 Congolese census. The most populous settlements in the department as of the 2023 census are Mossaka (31,347), Liranga (12,985) and Loukoléla (12,406).

The Mbochi are the main ethnic group in Congo-Oubangui.

== Economy and infrastructure ==
Agriculture and fishing are the main economic activities in Congo-Oubangui. The main crop grown is manioc. Rwandan refugees have introduced market gardening practices into the area.

There are no long-distance roads in the department, and only one airstrip at Loukoléla. The Congo River and its tributaries serve as the department's main transportation routes. The Congo and Ubangi rivers are navigable year-round. The Sangha is navigable from its confluence with the Congo upstream as far as Ouésso, and the Likouala-aux-Herbes as far as Epena. In the rainy season, the Kouyou and Likouala-Mossaka rivers are navigable between Mossaka and Owando.
