= Boundji Airport =

- IATA: BOE; ICAO: FCOB

Summary
- Airport type: Public
- Serves: Boundji, Republic of the Congo
- Elevation AMSL: 380 m / 1,247 ft
- Coordinates: 1°01′52″S 15°20′05″E

Map
- Location in the Republic of the Congo

Runways
| Direction | Length | | Surface |
| Direction | m | ft | Surface |
|---|---|---|---|
| 10/28 | 1,080 | 3,543 | Gravel |
- Source: GCM Google Maps

Boundji Airport (IATA: BOE, ICAO: FCOB) is an airport serving the city of Boundji in Cuvette Department, Republic of the Congo. The runway is on the western edge of the city, and has an additional 700 metres (2,300 ft) of cleared, unpaved overrun on its western end.

== See also ==
- List of airports in the Republic of the Congo
- Transport in the Republic of the Congo
