= Jean-Jacques Bouya =

Congolese politician (born 1962)

Jean-Jacques Bouya (born 24 May 1962) is a Congolese politician who has served in the government of Congo-Brazzaville as Minister of Spatial Planning and Major Projects since 2012. A pilot by profession, he served as Transport Adviser to President Denis Sassou Nguesso beginning in 1997 and as Delegate-General for Major Projects beginning in 2003.

== Career ==
Born at Mouembé in Cuvette Region, Bouya is an ethnic Mbochi related to Denis Sassou Nguesso, who became President of Congo-Brazzaville in 1979; he is the son of a cousin of Sassou Nguesso. He worked as a professional pilot, flying a presidential Boeing 727 from 1989 to 1992. After Sassou Nguesso was succeeded by Pascal Lissouba in 1992, Bouya instead flew a Fokker 28 for Lina Congo, the national airline, until 1997.

Sassou Nguesso returned to power in October 1997 at the conclusion of a civil war, and he appointed Bouya as Transport Adviser to the President in November 1997; Bouya was then considered part of Sassou Nguesso's "inner circle". He was additionally appointed as Delegate-General for Major Projects, while remaining Transport Adviser, in 2003; in his post as Delegate-General, he worked directly under the Presidency. Bouya was considered a powerful figure in the regime.

In June 2009, Bouya was included on Sassou Nguesso's campaign team for the July 2009 presidential election; he was placed in charge of logistics for the campaign.

At the Sixth Extraordinary Congress of the Congolese Labour Party (PCT), held in July 2011, Bouya was elected to the PCT's 51-member Political Bureau, increasing his political influence. On 7 October 2011, Sassou Nguesso assigned Bouya responsibility for the coordination of the government's work, a move that was viewed as effectively making Bouya a de facto prime minister. Bouya also retained his existing post as Delegate-General for Major Projects.

In the July 2012 parliamentary election, Bouya was elected to the National Assembly as the PCT candidate in Tchikapika constituency, located in Cuvette Region; he won the seat in the first round of voting, receiving 100% of the vote. He was the only candidate; two independent candidates withdrew prior to the vote in favor of Bouya.

Following the 2012 election, Bouya was appointed to the government as Minister at the Presidency for Spatial Planning and the General Delegation for Major Projects on 25 September 2012. The decision to include Bouya in the government was attributed to a need to assuage the concerns of foreign partners about the lack of parliamentary oversight for Bouya and his General Delegation for Major Projects; given the amount of power wielded by Bouya, it seemed incongruous that he did not hold a government ministry through which he could be held accountable by Parliament.

Although he no longer served as Transport Adviser to the President, in 2013 it was reported that Bouya effectively controlled matters relating to transportation, marginalizing Minister of State for Transport Rodolphe Adada.

Bouya was deputy national director of Sassou Nguesso's campaign for the March 2016 presidential election, responsible for logistics and programming. After Sassou Nguesso's re-election, he retained Bouya in his post as Minister of Spatial Planning and Major Projects on 30 April 2016.

In the July 2017 parliamentary election, Bouya stood unopposed as a candidate in Tchikapika, with no other candidates standing in the constituency.
