= Motaba =

Motaba may refer to:

- Motaba River, Republic of Congo; a river found in the Likouala Department; see List of rivers of the Republic of the Congo
- Motaba virus, the fictional hemorrhagic fever virus found in the 1995 film Outbreak (film)
