= Climate change in the Democratic Republic of the Congo =

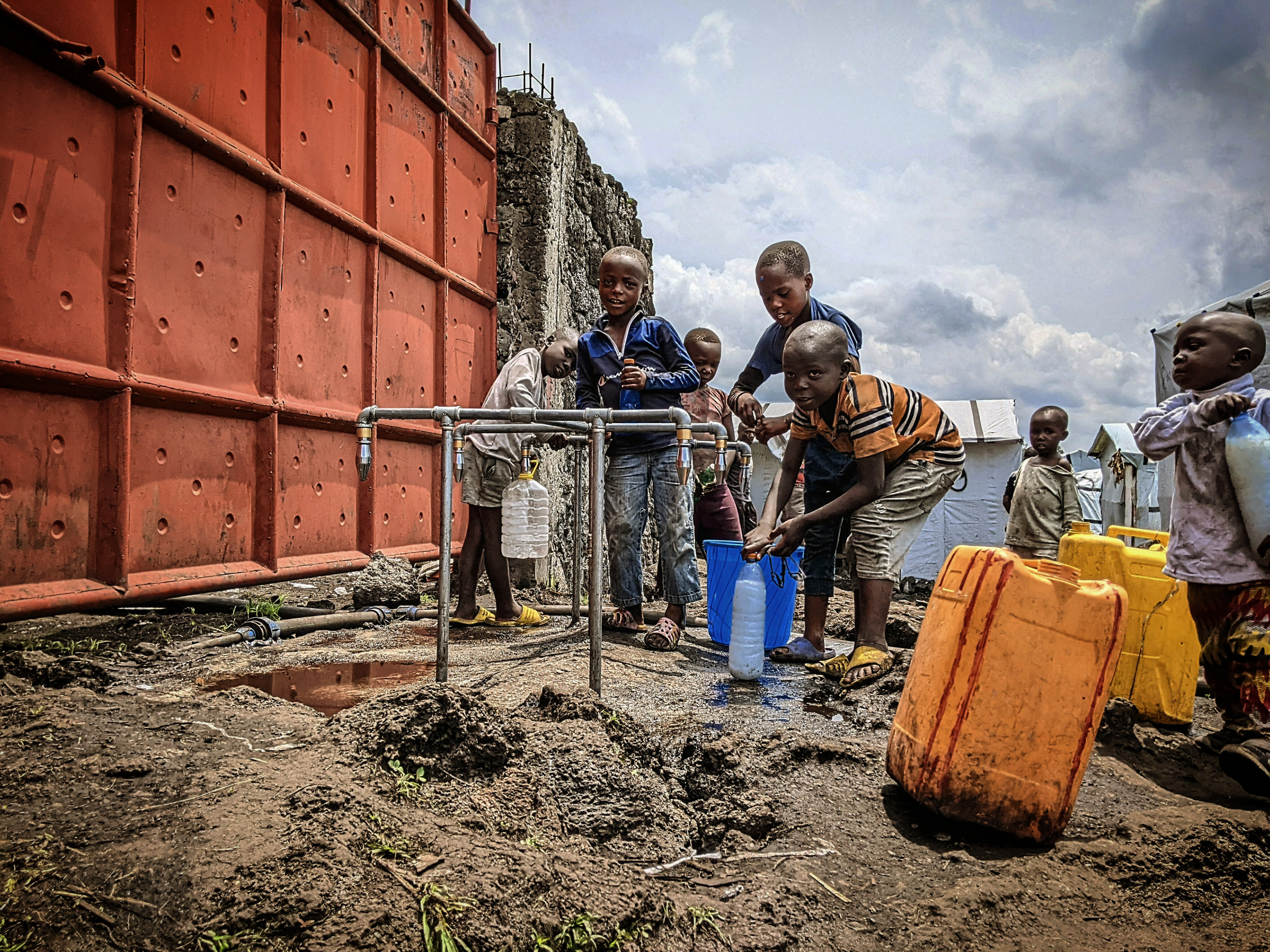
Children of Goma queuing for clean water during a water shortage caused by a severe drought (2023).

Climate change poses environmental challenges for the Congo. Factors such as the Congolese Civil War and political corruption have slowed progress in the country and made it difficult for it adapt to climate change. The deforestation and loss of peatlands, often driven by agricultural practices such as slash-and-burn agriculture for smallholdings, have contributed to emissions.

== Greenhouse gas emissions ==
In 2018 the Democratic Republic of the Congo produced 718 million tonnes CO2e of greenhouse gas emissions. Over 70% of this was from land use, land-use change, and forestry. This includes the deforestation of Congolian rainforests to make charcoal and to clear land as part of slash-and-burn agriculture.

There are two ways that deforestation can cause changes in climate – by changing greenhouse gas emissions and eco-climate impact, or by changing the eco-service patterns, in this case, rainfall. Forests are sinks for carbon. Rainforest, in particular, hold great amounts of carbon with their complex and robust ecosystems. As of 2023 forest within the DRC holds an estimated 23 billion tons of carbon (GtCO2e), which is the largest stock in Africa. Most of the Congo Basin is in the DRC and vice-versa. Deforestation is projected to continue. The government estimated average annual emissions due to deforestation from 2015 to 2019 at slightly over 1 billion tons. However the 2023 greenhouse gas inventory by the government put 2018 emissions due to forests at about half a billion tons and absorption about the same.

Increased replacement of tropical rainforest vegetation with savanna grasslands can produce undesired climate changes in Africa, as forests are also providers of rainfall. The destruction of forest prevents such eco-services and leads to changes in landscape. In areas that are heavily deforested, rainfall can decrease throughout the year; and specifically if over deforestation occurs in southern Africa, it may result in increased rainfall in the southern region of the DRC. This intensifies the loss of topsoil, prevents tall plants from growing back (changing the landscape permanently), and furthers the eco-climate change pattern and impacting plant and animal life. Researchers have also begun running simulations to predict future conditions and concluded that great biodiversity loss will result if the DRC continues its current deforestation patterns. The Salonga National Park, for example, stands to lose around 7 species of mammals by 2050, and 19 species by 2080 if the DRC population do not reduce their heat-trapping emissions which result from deforestation.

== Impact ==
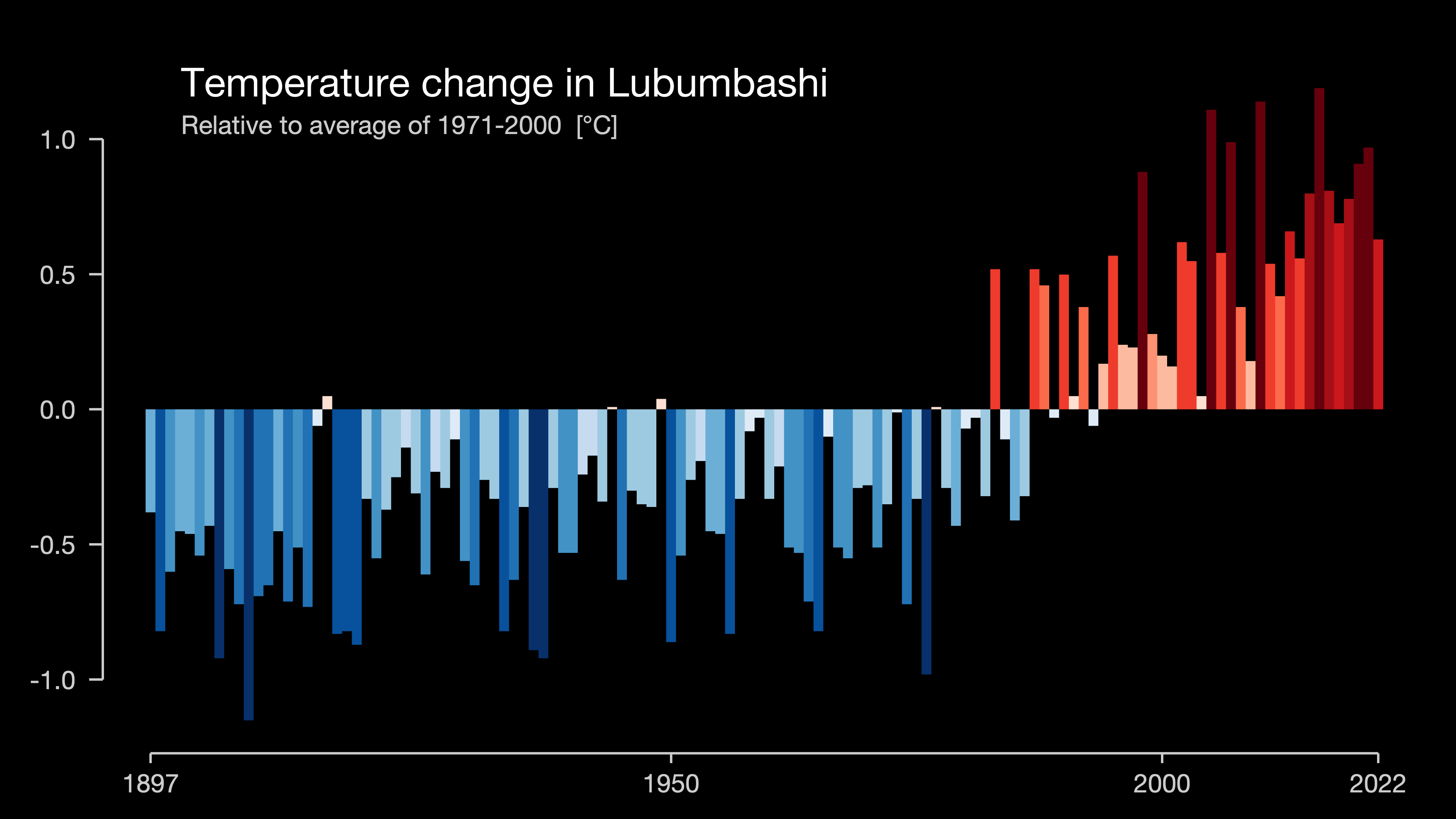
Change in temperature in Lubumbashi

The temperature has increased by 1.5C as of 2025. Increased evapotranspiration is projected to cause more drought. By 2100 average daily rainfall is projected to decrease, especially in the west of the country. Climate change may be increasing floods, but a lack of weather stations as of 2025 means predictions are uncertain. The coastline is expected to recede by 50 to 100m by 2100 but sea level rise is not the only reason. Biodiversity is expected to be affected. Unlike the Amazon rainforest, the Congo rainforest is not thought vulnerable to tipping.

Agriculture in the DRC is vulnerable. As of 2025 further study is needed to determine whether increased extreme heat is affected maternal and newborn health. Although not the main cause, increased rainfall might worsen gullies. Although war is the main cause, floods also cause internal migration. Drought and heatwaves impact indigenous people.

The 2021 Nationally Determined Contribution of the DRC committed to a 21% reduction by 2030 conditional on international help. Avoiding carbon loss from peatland in the Central Congolian lowland forests is important. The large Tumba-Ngiri-Maindombe wetland is a major carbon sink. Clean energy being developed includes a 1 GW solar power plant. As of 2026 less than a quarter of people have electricity so the African Development Bank aims to increase that. An estimated 2.5% of people use electricity to cook, whereas over 95% of households are estimated to use mainly firewood and charcoal. The Clean Cooking Alliance promotes improved cookstoves, and the government LPG.

There is a national adaptation plan. The World Bank is supporting urban infrastructure more resilient against erosion and flooding. It has been suggested that local climate smart agriculture practices should be supported by the national government.
