= Okoyo Airport =

- IATA: OKG; ICAO: none

Summary
- Airport type: Public
- Serves: Okoyo, Republic of the Congo
- Elevation AMSL: 1,415 ft / 431 m
- Coordinates: 1°27′00″S 15°04′20″E

Map
- Location of airport in the Republic of the Congo

Runways
Direction	Length		Surface
Direction	m	ft	Surface
03/21	1,640	5,381	Grass
- Source: GCM Google Maps

Okoyo Airport (IATA: OKG) is an airstrip serving the town of Okoyo in the Cuvette Department of the Republic of the Congo. The runway is 1.5 kilometres (1 mi) north of the town.

== See also ==
- List of airports in the Republic of the Congo
- Transport in the Republic of the Congo
