= Likouala =

Likouala may refer to:

- Likouala Department, Republic of the Congo
- Likouala-Mossaka, a tributary of the Congo River
- Likouala-aux-Herbes, a tributary of the Sangha River
