= Bouya =

Bouya is a surname. Notable people with the surname include:

- Cheikh M'Bengue (Cheikh Sidy Bouya M'Bengue; born 1988), French footballer
- Fodé Bouya Camara (born 1946), Guinean footballer
- Jean-Jacques Bouya (born 1962), Congolese politician
