= Ouragan.cd =

Congolese digital news outlet

- Former name: OuraganFm
- Website type: Digital media outlet
- Available in: French
- Founded: 2018; 8 years ago
- Headquarters: Gombe, Kinshasa
- Area served: Democratic Republic of the Congo
- Owner: Groupe OuraganFm Sarl
- Founders: Jeanric Umande Mwenge; Lyly Miandabu Mutombo
- Key people: Jeanric Umande Mwenge (director general); Lyly Miandabu Mutombo (deputy director general); Alexis Emba (publication director); Charles Masudi (editor-in-chief); Reagan Ndota (deputy editor-in-chief)
- Website: ouragan.cd
- Current status: Active

Ouragan.cd is a Congolese digital news outlet headquartered in Gombe, Kinshasa, Democratic Republic of the Congo. It is operated by Groupe OuraganFm Sarl and was founded by journalists Jeanric Umande Mwenge and Lyly Miandabu Mutombo. The outlet covers political, security, economic, social, and cultural issues in the country. Initially launched as the web radio service OuraganFm, it adopted the name Ouragan.cd in 2021 as it developed into a broader digital news outlet.

In 2023, Groupe OuraganFm expanded into print media with the launch of Ouragan, a biweekly general-interest newspaper distributed in Kinshasa and several other provinces.

In a Les Points media survey conducted during the first half of 2026, Ouragan.cd led digital news outlets in Kinshasa with 56% of respondents' preferences, ahead of AfricaNews at 54% and Scoop RDC at 51%.

== History ==
OuraganFm was founded by Congolese journalists Jeanric Umande Mwenge and Lyly Miandabu Mutombo and established in Gombe, Kinshasa, in 2018 under Groupe OuraganFm Sarl. Initially operating as a web radio service through the domain Ouraganfm.cd, it developed into a general-interest digital news outlet covering the Democratic Republic of the Congo and international affairs. In March 2018, ChallengeInfo described the outlet as an independent digital news portal. Its founders stated that its editorial policy emphasized independence and nonpartisan coverage.

In January 2021, OuraganFm.cd was renamed Ouragan.cd. Umande explained that keeping "FM" in the name could make the website seem like the online platform of a radio station rather than a broader multimedia news outlet. The existing editorial team remained after the rebranding. In 2023, Groupe OuraganFm Sarl expanded into print media with the launch of Ouragan, a biweekly general-interest newspaper distributed in Kinshasa and several provinces.

== Organization ==
Ouragan.cd is operated by Groupe OuraganFm Sarl and is headquartered in Gombe, Kinshasa. It is headed by director general Jeanric Umande Mwenge and deputy director general Lyly Miandabu Mutombo, with Alexis Emba serving as publication director. Its editorial staff is led by editor-in-chief Charles Masudi and deputy editor-in-chief Reagan Ndota. The newsroom includes journalists covering politics, economics, justice, culture, society, sports, health, and environmental issues. The outlet also maintains a network of correspondents outside Kinshasa, including in Kongo Central, North Kivu, South Kivu, Tshopo, Kasaï, Lomami, and Kasaï-Central.

Ouragan.cd describes itself as independent and nonpartisan. In a 2019 interview, Umande said that it sought to cover both the government and political opposition without aligning itself with either. Its content also includes commentary, interviews, and profiles of figures in Congolese public life.

In 2023, Groupe OuraganFm expanded into print media with the launch of Ouragan, a biweekly general-interest newspaper distributed in Kinshasa and several other provinces.

In a Les Points media survey covering the first half of 2026, Ouragan.cd ranked first among digital news outlets in Kinshasa with 56% of respondents' preferences, followed by AfricaNews with 54% and Scoop RDC with 51%.

== 2024 Ministry of Planning dispute ==
On 10 September 2024, Ouragan.cd published an article questioning a procurement contract involving the Ministry of Planning and Development Aid Coordination (Ministère du Plan et de la Coordination de l'Aide au Développement). The article questioned the provisional award of a contract to consulting firm Klaroff for a feasibility study concerning a proposed Ministry five-story building intended to accommodate archives, offices and technical departments. It questioned the cost and necessity of the project, the selection of Klaroff, and aspects of the procurement process. On 13 September, the Ministry issued a right of reply disputing the article's characterization of the project and accused Ouragan.cd of publishing misleading information about Deputy Prime Minister and Planning Minister Guylain Nyembo Mbwizya.

The Ministry said that the project had been initiated in 2022, before Nyembo took office. It stated that an open request for expressions of interest had been launched on 20 May 2022 and attracted six firms: Groupe Muamba, ARTER SARL + VSI Afrique, Green Studio & Partners, African Engineering & Consulting, Yambo & Associés and Klaroff. The Ministry stated that Klaroff received the highest evaluation score, 90.80%, ahead of Green Studio & Partners with 88.80% and ARTER SARL + VSI Afrique with 85.70%. The Ministry also said that the contract was worth approximately FC410.5 million (about US$146,600), rather than US$410 million. It maintained that the procurement process had followed applicable procedures, citing review by the Directorate General for Public Procurement Control (Direction générale du contrôle des marchés publics; DGCMP) and publication of the documentation by the Public Procurement Regulatory Authority (Autorité de régulation des marchés publics; ARMP).
