= MKJ =

MKJ or mkj may refer to:

- MKJ, the IATA code of Makoua Airport, Republic of the Congo
- mkj, the ISO 639 code of the Mokilese language of Micronesia
- Martin Luther King Jr., American civil rights activist
