= Loukoléla =

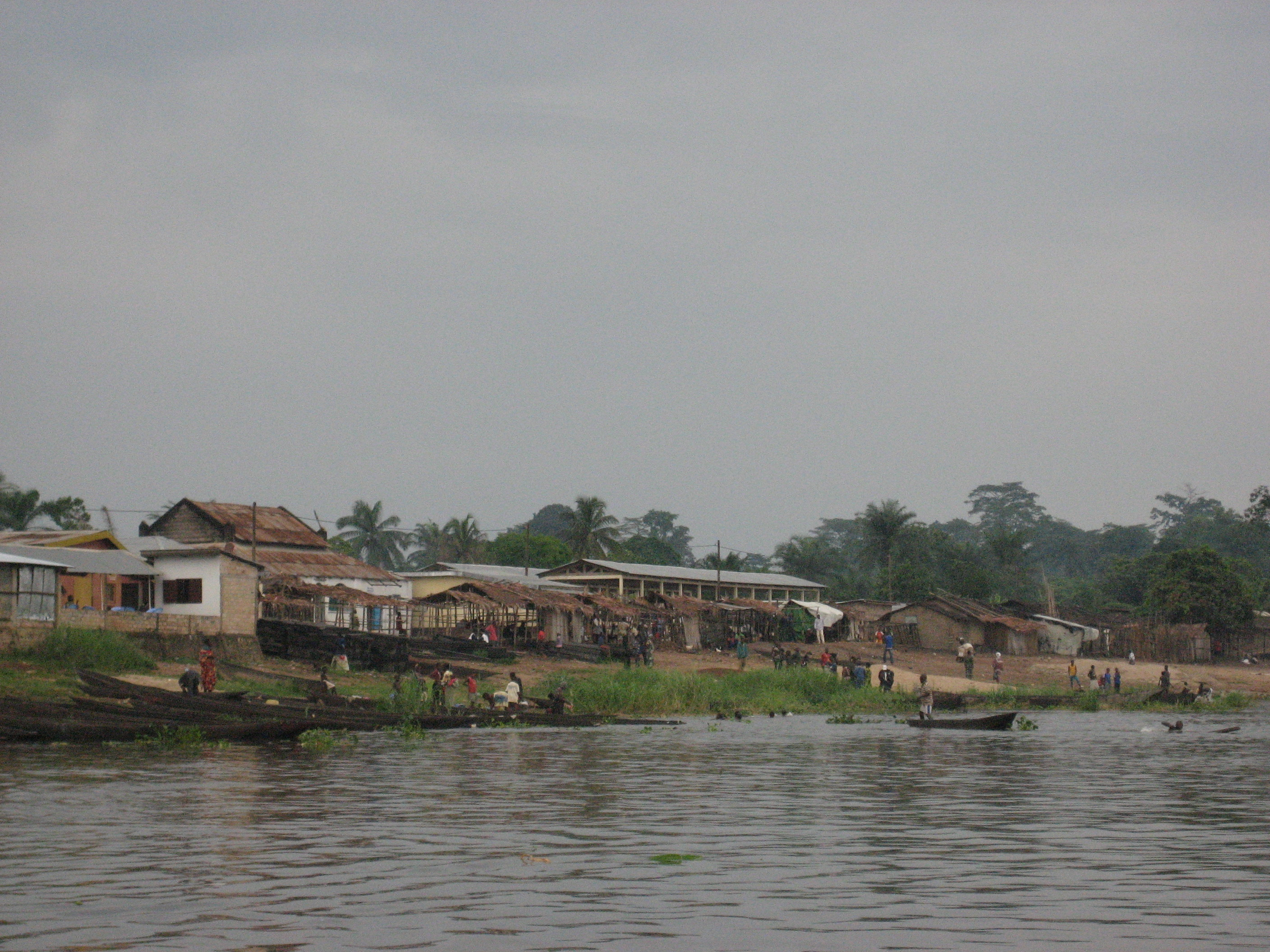
- The Congo riverfront at Loukoléla

- Location in the Republic of the Congo
- Coordinates: 1°2′17″S 17°6′42″E
- Country: Republic of the Congo
- Department: Congo-Oubangui
- District: Loukoléla

Population (2023 census)
  - Total: 12,406

Loukoléla is a town in the department of Congo-Oubangui in eastern Republic of the Congo. It is the administrative seat of the Loukoléla District.

== See also ==
- Lukolela
