= Makoua =

- Location in the Republic of the Congo
- Coordinates: 0°0′24″S 15°37′5″E
- Country: Republic of the Congo
- Department: Cuvette
- District: Makoua

Population (2023 census)
  - Total: 34,408

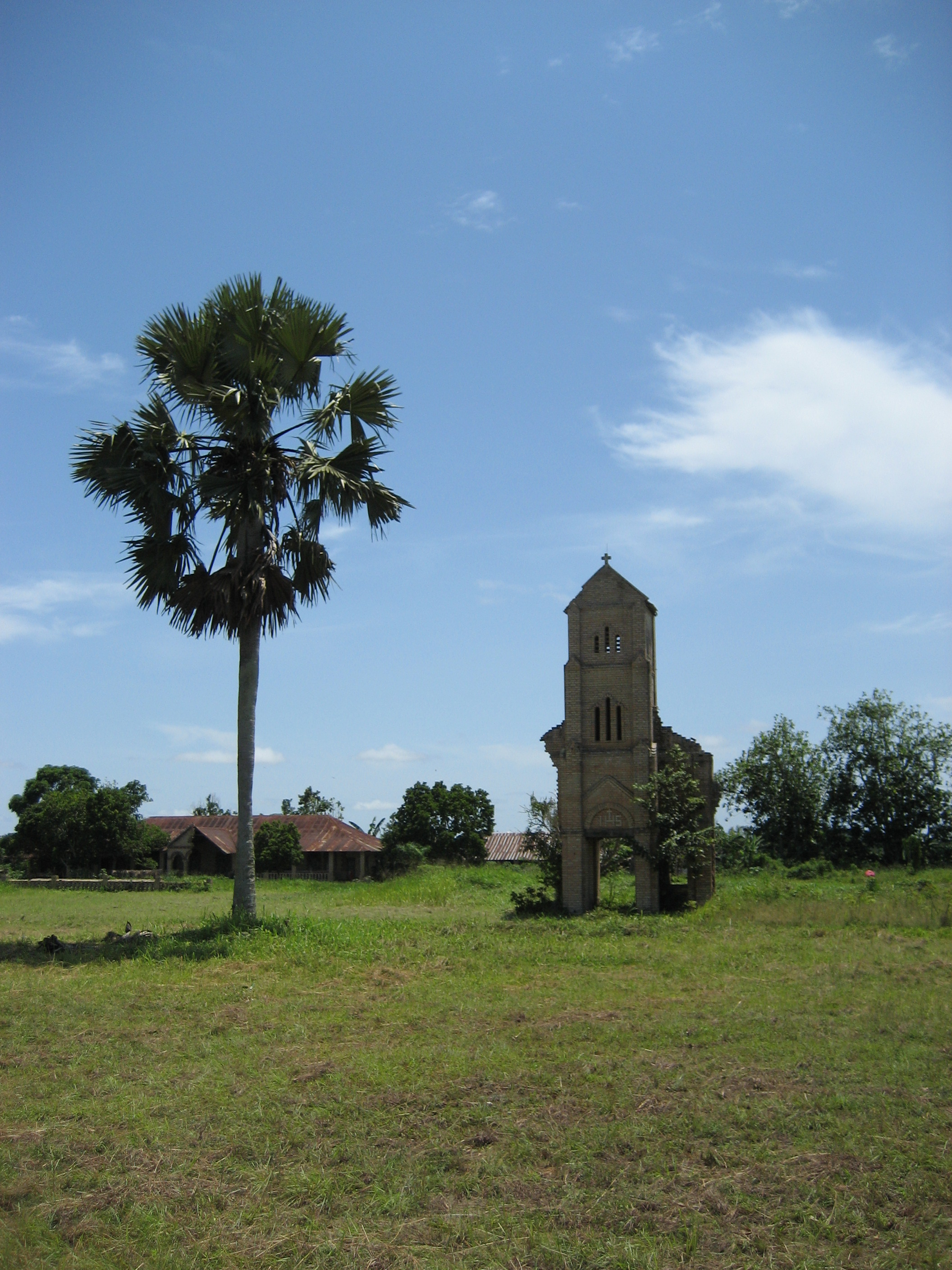
Ruins of the former church of Makoua, Republic of the Congo

Makoua is a town in the Republic of the Congo, lying on the equator at the southern edge of the rainforest, north of Owando. It is the seat of the Makoua District in the Cuvette Department.

It is home to an airport.

== Climate ==
Makouas has a tropical rainforest climate (Af), with heavy rainfall year-round.

Climate data for Makoua (1955-2022)
Month	Jan	Feb	Mar	Apr	May	Jun	Jul	Aug	Sep	Oct	Nov	Dec	Year
Record high °C (°F)	35.3 (95.5)	39.0 (102.2)	37.0 (98.6)	36.0 (96.8)	40.1 (104.2)	36.0 (96.8)	33.2 (91.8)	34.0 (93.2)	34.9 (94.8)	35.8 (96.4)	39.2 (102.6)	35.5 (95.9)	40.1 (104.2)
Mean daily maximum °C (°F)	29.2 (84.6)	30.1 (86.2)	30.5 (86.9)	30.3 (86.5)	29.9 (85.8)	28.4 (83.1)	27.2 (81.0)	27.9 (82.2)	28.6 (83.5)	29.3 (84.7)	29.3 (84.7)	28.9 (84.0)	29.1 (84.4)
Daily mean °C (°F)	24.8 (76.6)	25.4 (77.7)	25.6 (78.1)	25.6 (78.1)	25.4 (77.7)	24.3 (75.7)	23.4 (74.1)	23.9 (75.0)	24.4 (75.9)	24.9 (76.8)	24.8 (76.6)	24.6 (76.3)	24.8 (76.6)
Mean daily minimum °C (°F)	20.4 (68.7)	20.6 (69.1)	20.8 (69.4)	20.9 (69.6)	20.8 (69.4)	20.2 (68.4)	19.6 (67.3)	20.0 (68.0)	20.3 (68.5)	20.4 (68.7)	20.4 (68.7)	20.3 (68.5)	20.4 (68.7)
Record low °C (°F)	10.6 (51.1)	15.6 (60.1)	17.5 (63.5)	14.0 (57.2)	14.5 (58.1)	13.0 (55.4)	15.0 (59.0)	15.2 (59.4)	12.2 (54.0)	17.5 (63.5)	17.8 (64.0)	15.5 (59.9)	10.6 (51.1)
Average precipitation mm (inches)	273.0 (10.75)	269.9 (10.63)	307.1 (12.09)	314.1 (12.37)	298.0 (11.73)	250.4 (9.86)	244.3 (9.62)	274.2 (10.80)	346.6 (13.65)	348.0 (13.70)	292.9 (11.53)	279.4 (11.00)	3,497.9 (137.73)
Average precipitation days (≥ 1.0 mm)	11.3	11.8	13.6	14.0	14.6	11.1	9.4	11.0	14.7	17.5	14.5	12.9	156.5
Source: NOAA
