= Mossaka =

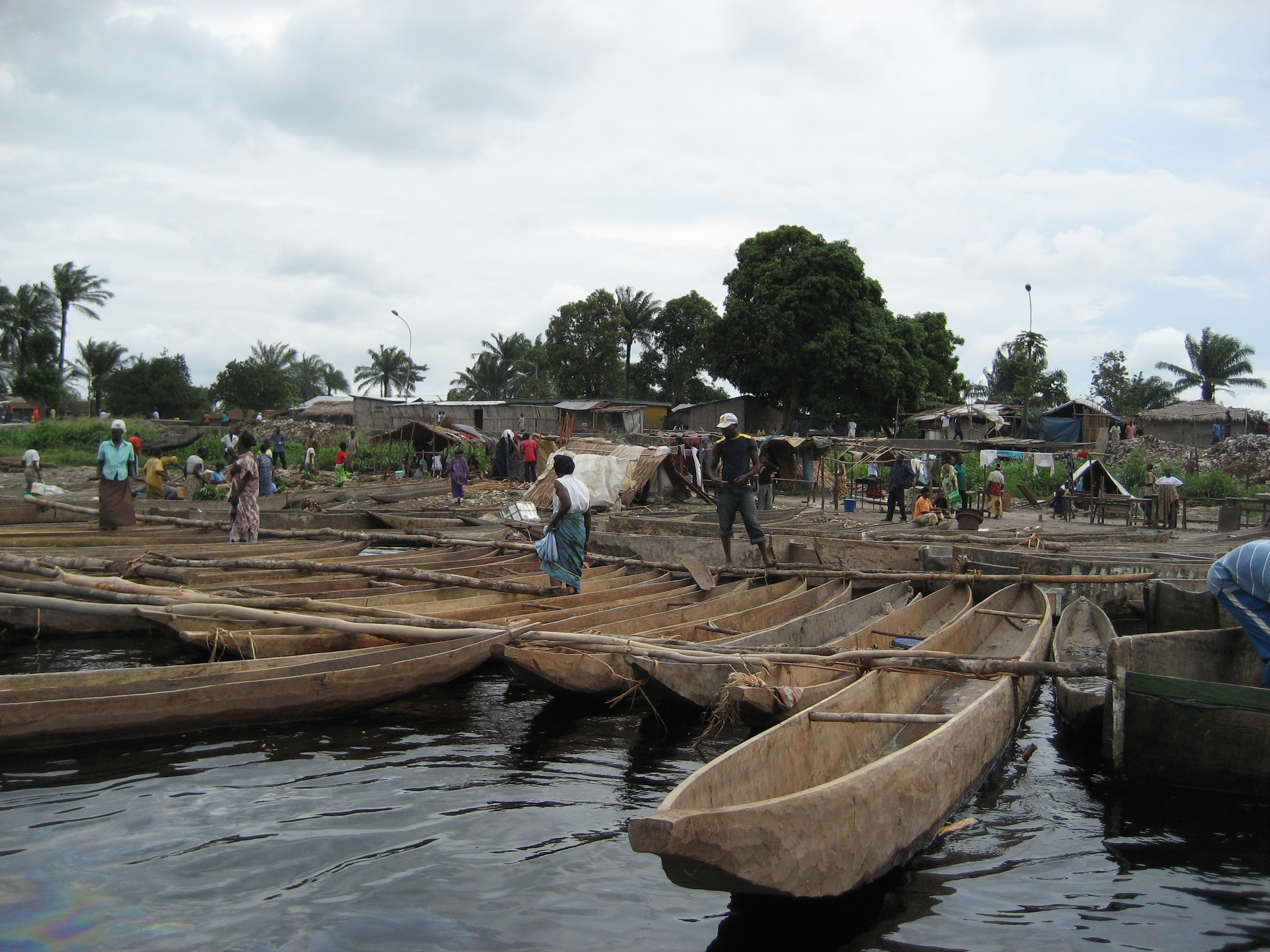
- The port in Mossaka

- Location in the Republic of the Congo
- Coordinates: 1°13′33″S 16°47′41″E
- Country: Republic of the Congo
- Department: Congo-Oubangui
- District: Mossaka

Population (2023 census)
  - Total: 31,347

Mossaka is the largest city and the capital of the Congo-Oubangui department in the Republic of the Congo.

Located on the banks of the Congo River to the west of the mouth of the Likouala-Mossaka, Mossaka is known for its large fish production.
