= Ntokou District =

Coordinates: 0°00′34″N 16°21′12″E

Ntokou
- District
- Interactive map of Ntokou
- Country: Republic of the Congo
- Region: Cuvette Department

Area
  - Total: 506 sq mi (1,311 km^{2})

Population (2023 census)
  - Total: 5,909
  - Density: 11.67/sq mi (4.507/km^{2})
- Time zone: UTC+1 (GMT +1)

Ntokou is a district in the Cuvette Department of Republic of the Congo.
