= List of rivers of the Republic of the Congo =

This is a list of rivers in the Republic of the Congo. This list is arranged by Drainage basin, with respective tributaries indented under each larger stream's name.

== Atlantic Ocean ==
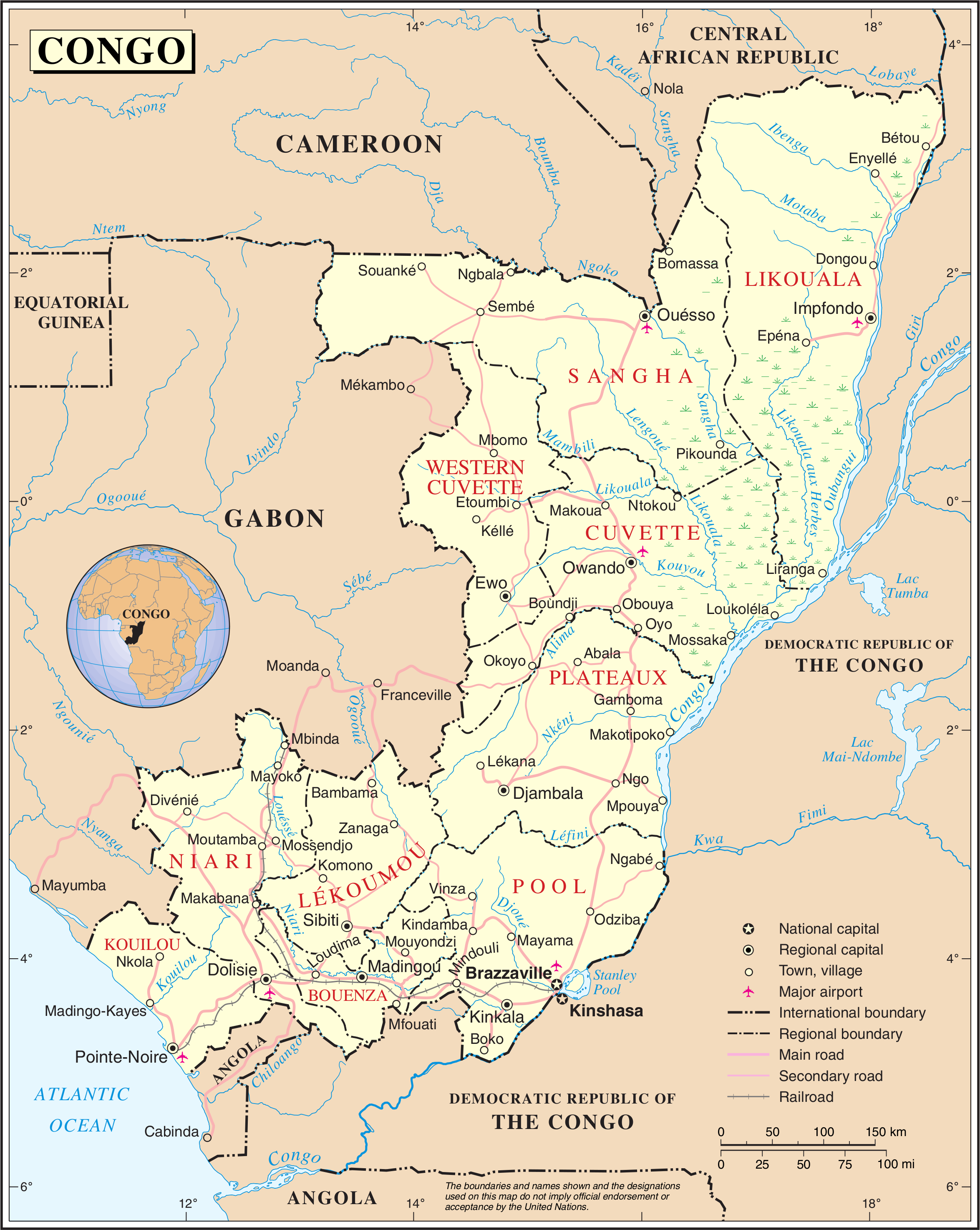
Map of the Republic of the Congo showing the main rivers and tributaries.

- Ogooué River
  - Ngounie River
  - Ivindo River
    - Djadie River
    - Djoua River
    - Aïna River
  - Letili River
- Nyanga River
- Kouilou-Niari River
  - Louésse River
- Chiloango River
- Congo River
  - Djoué River
  - Lefini River
  - Nkéni River
  - Alima River
    - Lékéti River
  - Likouala-Mossaka
    - Kouyou River
    - Lengoué River
    - Mambili River
  - Sangha River
    - Dja River (Ngoko River)
  - Likouala-aux-Herbes
  - Ubangi River
    - Motaba River
    - Ibenga River
