= Okoyo =

- Town
- Location in the Republic of the Congo
- Coordinates: 1°28′S 15°05′E
- Country: Republic of the Congo
- Region: Cuvette Region
- District: Okoyo District
- Elevation: 1,210 ft (370 m)

Population (2023 census)
  - Total: 4,270

Okoyo is a town and the seat of Okoyo District in the Cuvette Region in central Republic of the Congo. It is on the Alima River and is served by Okoyo Airport.
