= Okoyo District =

Coordinates: 1.463°S 15.077°E

Okoyo
- District
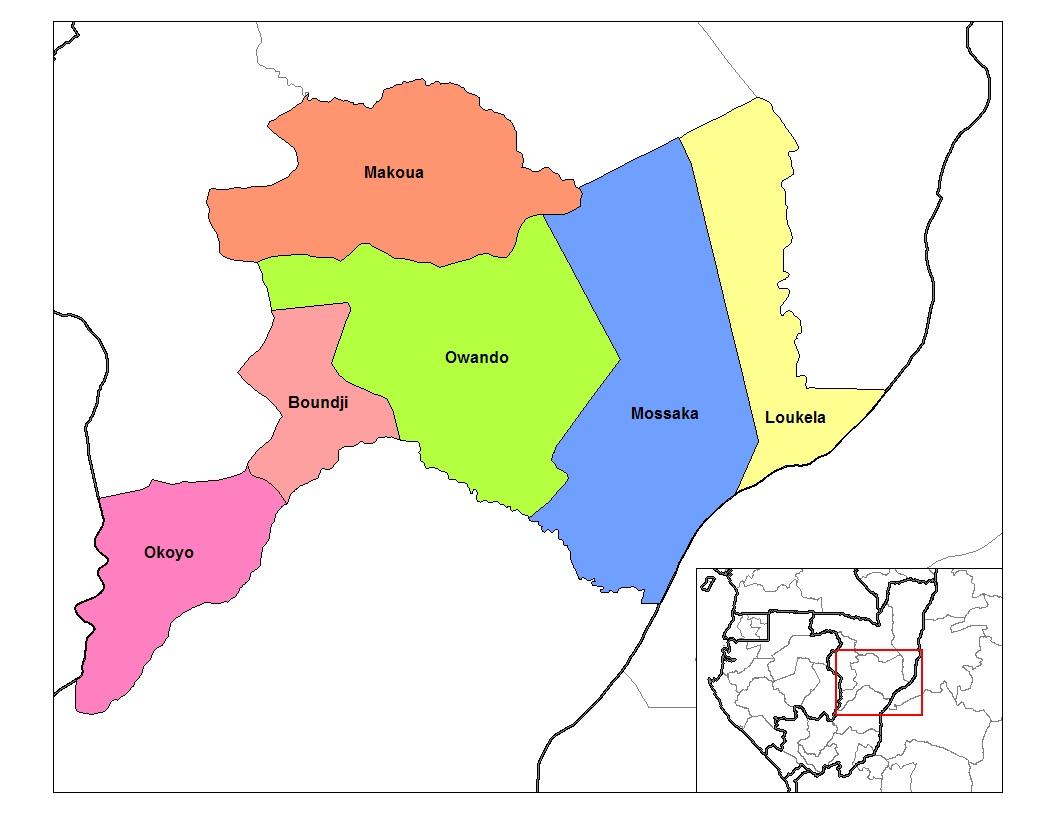
- Okoyo District in the region
- Country: Republic of the Congo
- Region: Cuvette-Ouest Department
- Seat: Okoyo

Area
  - Total: 1,784 sq mi (4,621 km^{2})

Population (2023 census)
  - Total: 16,041
  - Density: 8.991/sq mi (3.471/km^{2})
- Time zone: UTC+1 (GMT +1)

Okoyo is a district in the Cuvette-Ouest Department, Republic of the Congo.
