= Ngoko District =

Ngoko
- District
- Interactive map of Ngoko
- Country: Republic of the Congo
- Region: Cuvette Department

Area
  - Total: 480 sq mi (1,250 km^{2})

Population (2023 census)
  - Total: 5,103
  - Density: 10.6/sq mi (4.08/km^{2})
- Time zone: UTC+1 (GMT +1)

Ngoko is a district in the Cuvette Department of Republic of the Congo.
