= Makoua Airport =

- IATA: MKJ; ICAO: FCOM

Summary
- Serves: Makoua, Republic of the Congo
- Elevation AMSL: 1,293 ft / 394 m
- Coordinates: 0°01′15″S 15°34′35″E

Map
- Location of airport in the Republic of the Congo

Runways
Direction	Length		Surface
Direction	m	ft	Surface
07/25	1,780	5,840	Gravel
- Source: GCM Google Maps

Makoua Airport (IATA: MKJ, ICAO: FCOM) is an airport serving the town of Makoua in the Cuvette Department, Republic of the Congo. The runway is 4 kilometres (2.5 mi) west of the town.

The Makoua VOR (Ident:CF) is located on the field.

== See also ==
- List of airports in the Republic of the Congo
- Transport in the Republic of the Congo
