= Boundji District =

Coordinates: 0°48′S 15°21′E

Boundji
- District
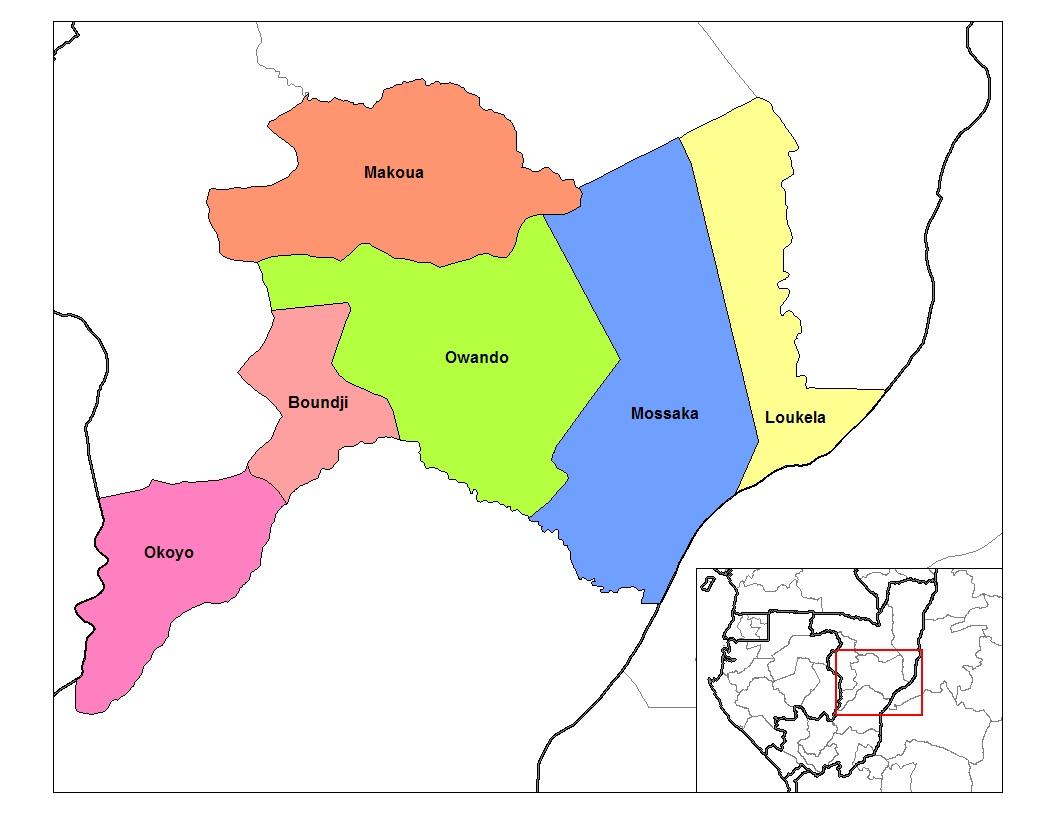
- Boundji District in the department
- Country: Republic of the Congo
- Department: Cuvette

Area
  - Total: 612 sq mi (1,584 km^{2})

Population (2023 census)
  - Total: 27,577
  - Density: 45.09/sq mi (17.41/km^{2})
- Time zone: UTC+1 (GMT +1)

Boundji is a district of the Cuvette Department in the Republic of the Congo. The administrative seat of the district is Boundji.
