= Lukolela =

Coordinates: 1°03′39″S 17°10′33″E

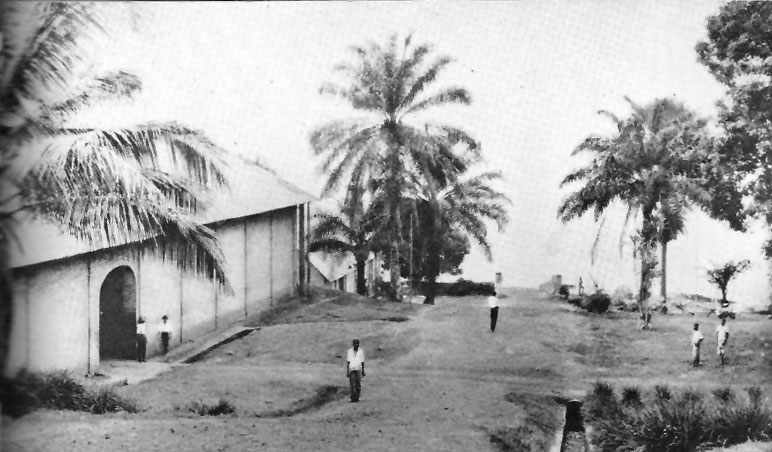
Landing place for river traffic at Lukolela, circa 1942

Lukolela is a town in Équateur Province in the Democratic Republic of the Congo on the Congo River bank. It is also the central town of the 'Lukolela territory', an administrative division of the province. It is opposite the Republic of Congo town of Loukolela. The Lukolela Swamp Rat is named after the town.
