= Alima =

River in Republic of the Congo

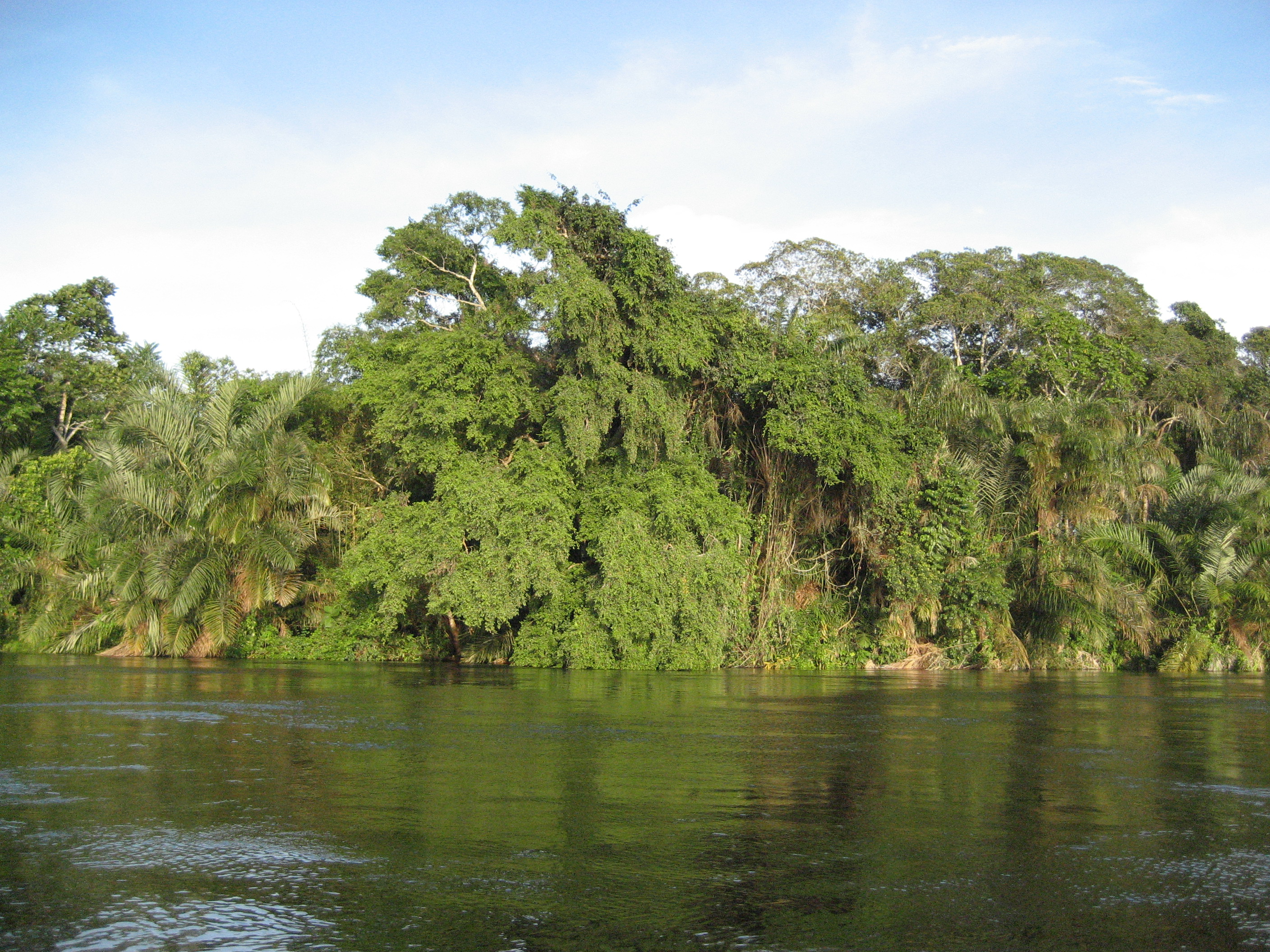
Alima

The Alima River (Swahili: Mto Alima) is a tributary of the Congo River. It is formed by the confluence of two streams, the Lékéti and the Dziélé.

== Towns ==
Towns on the banks of this river include (from the source):

- Okoyo
- Boundji
- Oyo

== Location ==
Point	Coordinates (links to map & photo sources)	Notes
Source - Lékéti	1.59564°S 14.95721°E	
Boundji	1.04608°S 15.35929°E	
Oyo	1.15998°S 15.96755°E	
Congo River confluence	1.60059°S 16.61646°E	

== See also ==
- List of rivers of the Republic of the Congo
