= Liranga District =

Liranga
- District
- Interactive map of Liranga
- Coordinates: 0.66°S 17.61°E
- Country: Republic of the Congo
- Department: Congo-Oubangui

Area
  - Total: 4,051 km^{2} (1,564 sq mi)

Population (2023 census)
  - Total: 30,141
  - Density: 7.440/km^{2} (19.27/sq mi)
- Time zone: UTC+1 (GMT +1)

Liranga is a district in the department of Congo-Oubangui of the Republic of the Congo.
