= Makoua District =

Coordinates: 0°04′N 15°45′E

Makoua
- District
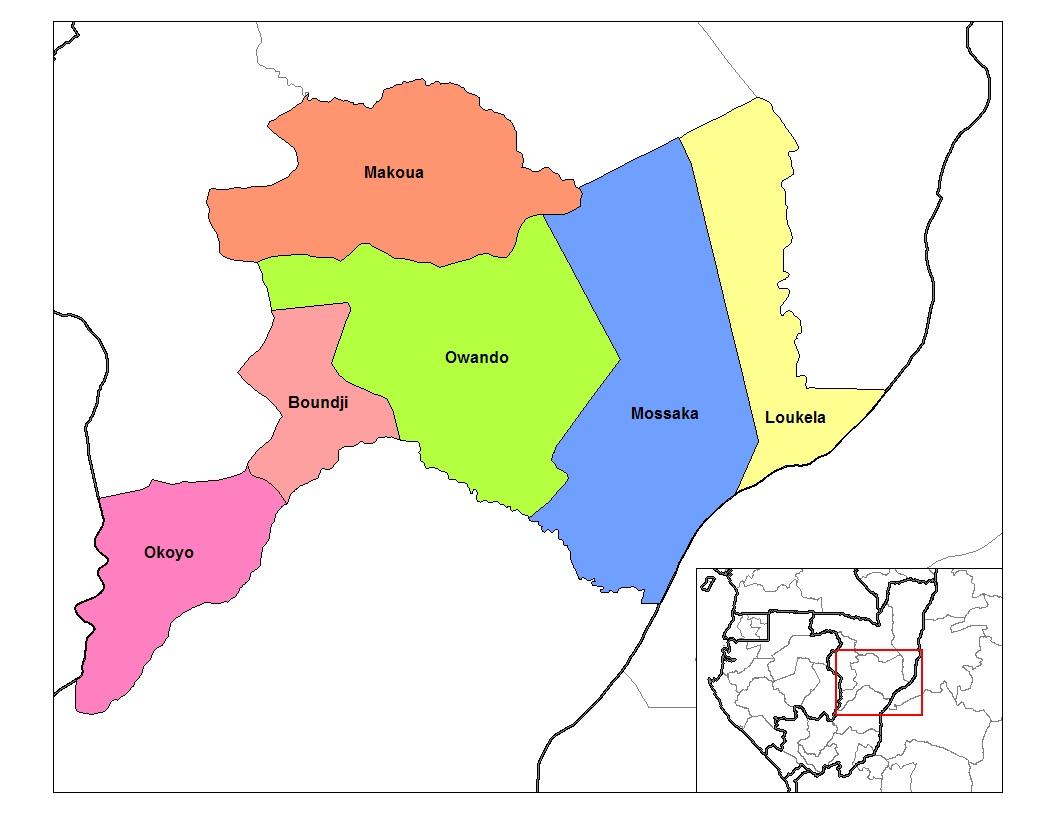
- Makoua District in the region
- Country: Republic of the Congo
- Region: Cuvette Region

Area
  - Total: 2,674 sq mi (6,926 km^{2})

Population (2023 census)
  - Total: 40,004
  - Density: 14.96/sq mi (5.776/km^{2})
- Time zone: UTC+1 (GMT +1)

Makoua is a district in the Cuvette Region of the Republic of the Congo. The capital lies at Makoua.
