= Kouyou River =

River in Republic of the Congo

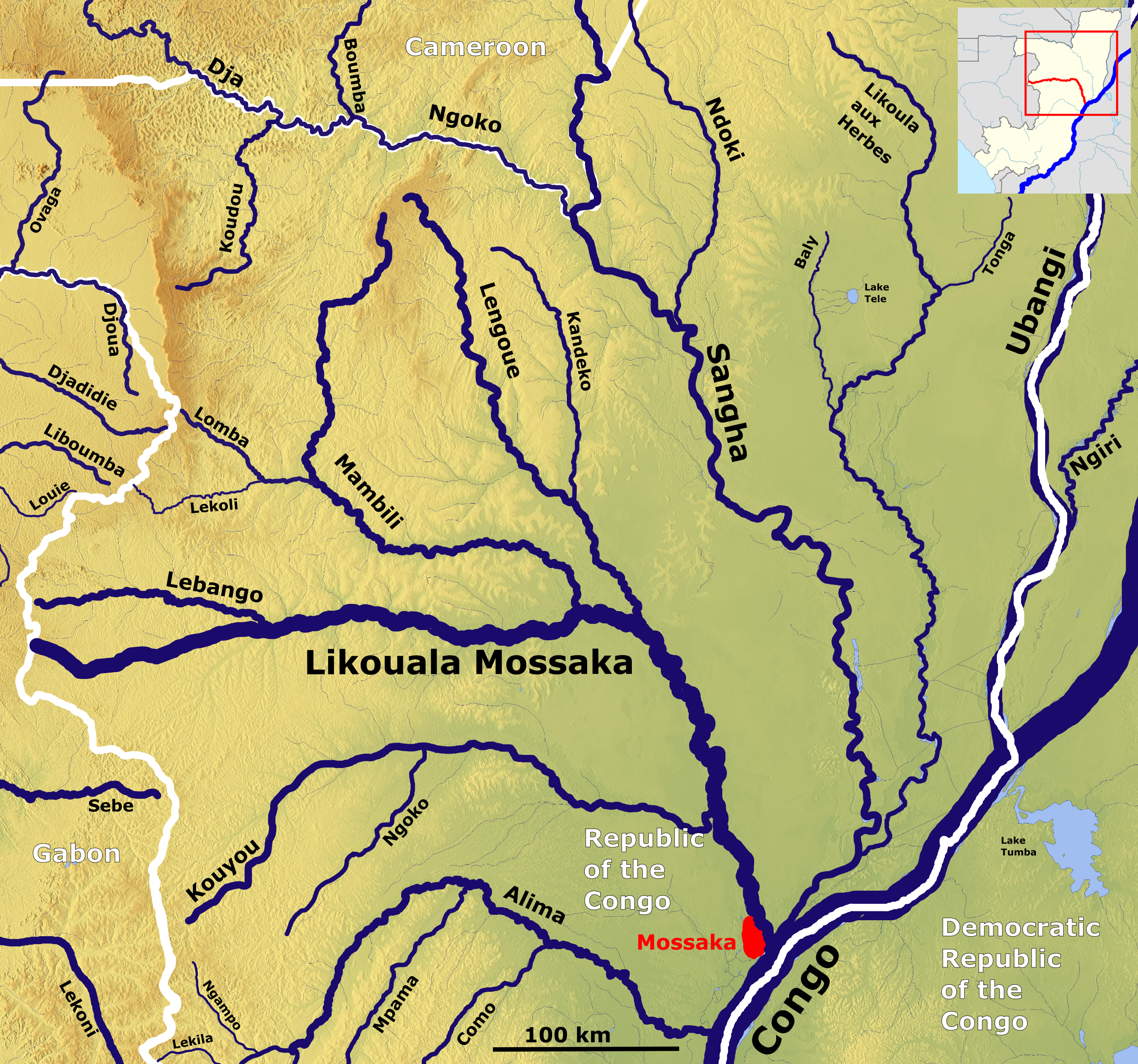
The Kouyou in the Likoula basin.

The Kouyou River is a minor river in central Republic of the Congo. Its source is the confluence of several streams. It is a tributary of the Likouala-Mossaka, which in turn feeds into the Congo River.

It is generally a meandering river, but there are rapids near Owando.

== Location ==
Point	Coordinates (links to map & photo sources)	Notes
Source	0.77777°S 14.7322°E	
Owando	0.4755°S 15.8944°E	
Likouala River confluence	0.75138°S 16.63611°E	

== See also ==
- List of rivers of the Republic of the Congo
