= Bokoma District =

Bokoma
- District
- Interactive map of Bokoma
- Coordinates: 0.37°S 17.1°E
- Country: Republic of the Congo
- Department: Congo-Oubangui

Area
  - Total: 3,080 km^{2} (1,190 sq mi)

Population (2023 census)
  - Total: 4,588
  - Density: 1.49/km^{2} (3.86/sq mi)
- Time zone: UTC+1 (GMT +1)

Bokoma is a district in the department of Congo-Oubangui of the Republic of the Congo.
