= Tumba-Ngiri-Maindombe =

Largest Wetland of International Importance in world

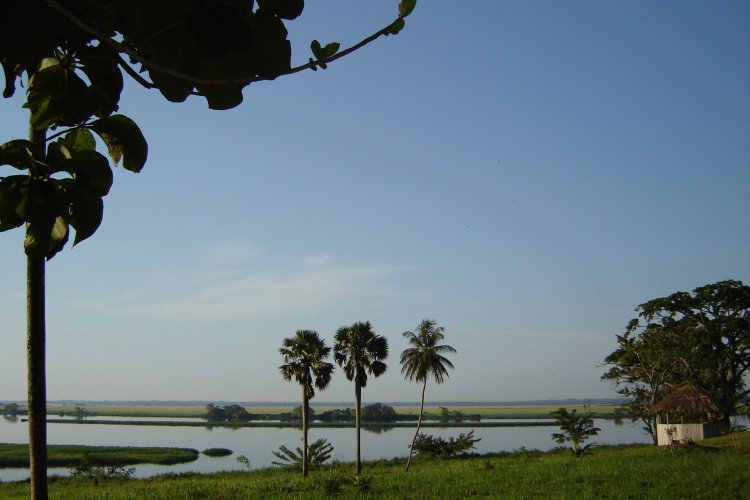
- Lake Mai-Ndombe

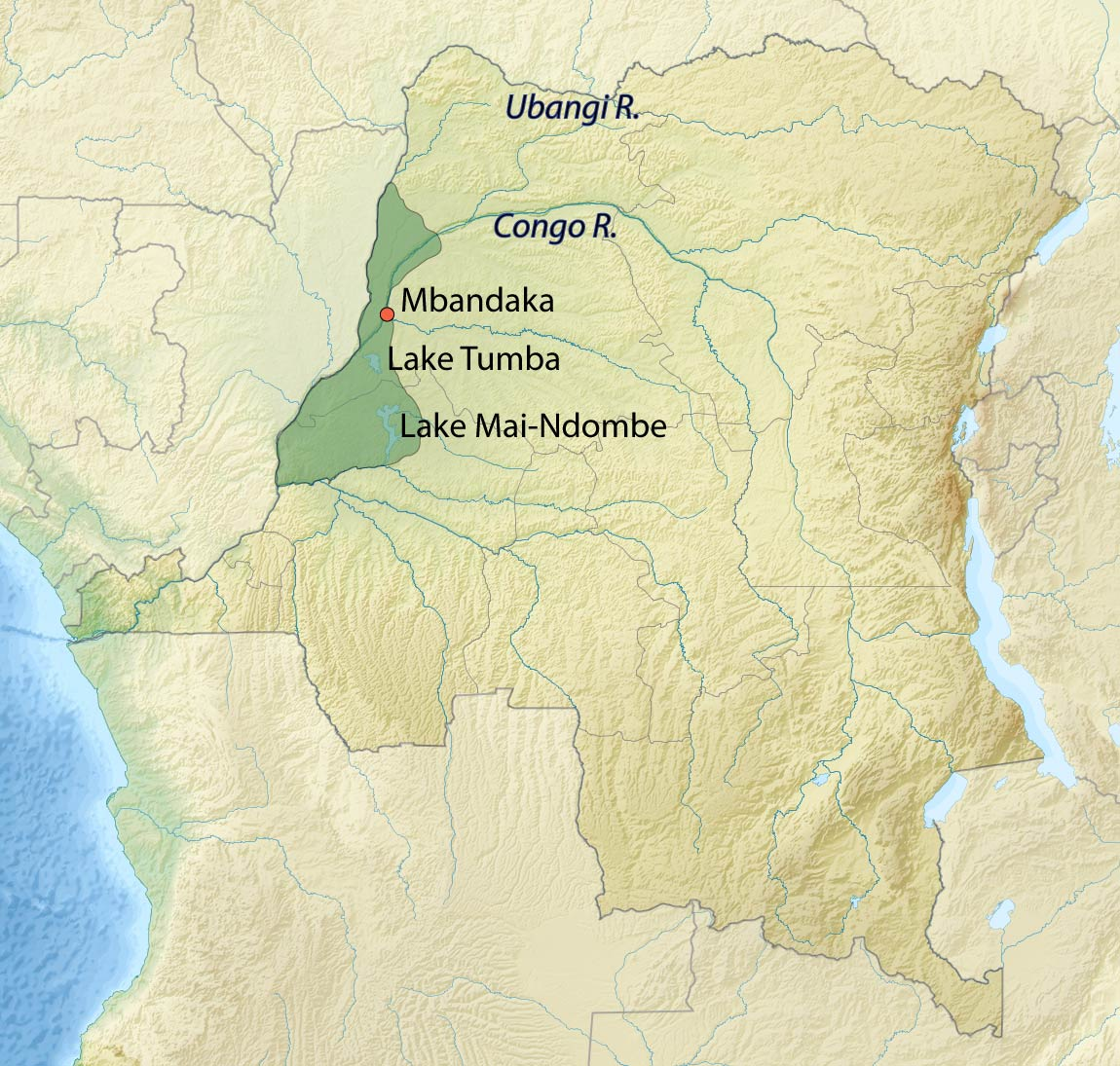
- Location in the DRC
- Nearest city: Mbandaka
- Coordinates: 0.681823°S 18.000412°E
- Area: 65,696 square kilometres (25,365 sq mi)
- Established: 2008

Ramsar Wetland
- Official name: Ngiri-Tumba-Maindombe
- Designated: 24 July 2008
- Reference no.: 1784

Tumba-Ngiri-Maindombe is the largest Wetland of International Importance in the world as recognized by the Ramsar Convention. (Note: Before Tumba-Ngiri-Maindombe was announced the Queen Maud Gulf in Canada was the world's largest Ramsar wetland with an area of 62,782 square kilometres (24,240 sq mi).) The site covers an area of 65,696 square kilometres (25,365 sq mi) in the region around Lake Tumba in the western Congo Basin in the Democratic Republic of the Congo (DRC). This is more than twice the size of Belgium or Maryland.

The vast area of forest and permanent or seasonal lakes and marshlands has great environmental and economic value. However, a rapidly growing population combined with weak and corrupt governance may be contributing to irreversible destruction.

== Location ==
The Ramsar wetland area of Tumba-Ngiri-Maindombe is bordered to the west by the Ubangi and Congo rivers, which form the boundary with the Republic of the Congo. The Kasai River and its tributary the Fimi River, which drains Lake Mai-Ndombe, define the southern boundary. Within the site, Lake Mai Ngombe is farthest south, with Lake Tumba to the north. Further north again is the city of Mbandaka, on the east bank of the Congo River. The region included in the Ramsar wetlands extends further north in the region between the Ubangi and the Congo, as far as the town of Makanza on the Congo.

== Environment ==
The Ubangi and Congo rivers join in the Tumba-Ngiri-Maindombe region to form a huge area of flooded forest covering more than 38,000 square kilometres (15,000 sq mi) that varies in size seasonally. When the wetlands around Lake Télé in the Republic of the Congo are included, the area contains the largest body of fresh water in Africa. The two largest areas of open water are the shallow lakes Tumba and Mai Ndombe. Lake Tumba covers about 765 square kilometres (295 sq mi) depending on the season, connected via the Irebu channel with the Congo river. Water may flow into or out of the lake through this channel depending on the floods. Lake Tumba has 114 species of fish. Lake Mai Ndombe covers about 2,300 square kilometres (890 sq mi) and is surrounded by flooded forests and swamps. Both lakes support important fisheries.

Tumba-Ngiri-Maindombe is part of the moist tropical forest of the Congo Basin, which includes over 10,000 plant species. The diverse fauna includes many bird species. It is home to hippopotamus and to three types of crocodile. Forest elephants, forest buffalo and leopards are of particular interest to conservationists. The wetlands are estimated to have 150 species of fish. The brown waters of the flooded forests, with plant fragments suspended in anaerobic conditions, are home to endemic species of fish uniquely adapted to this environment. These include members of Protopteridae, Polypteridae, Notopteridae, Clariidae, Anabantidae, and Channidae.

== Objectives ==
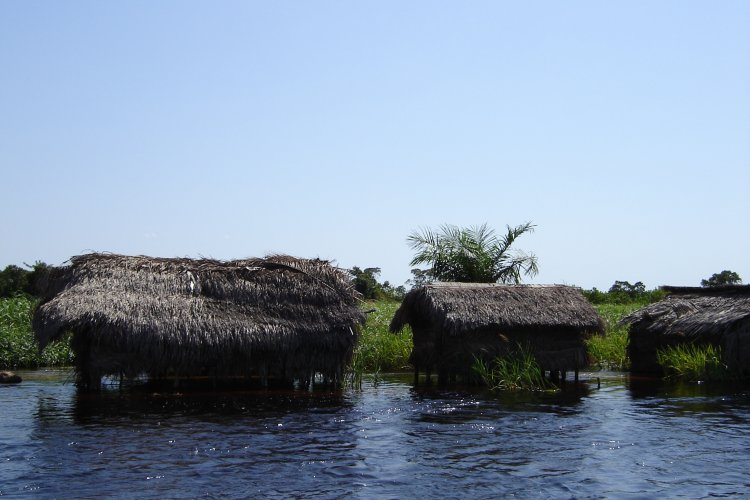
Houses on Lake Maï Ndombe

As a party to the Ramsar Convention, the DRC is obliged to identify wetlands of global importance and to ensure that they are used in a sustainable manner. Tumba-Ngiri-Maindombe is considered important because the vegetation of the flood basin absorbs water during the rainy season and releases it later, regulating flooding downstream. It helps filter impurities from water that is used by millions of people, and it provides breeding sites for fish that provide food for the inhabitants of cities such as Brazzaville and Kinshasa. The wetlands and forests also serve as a major carbon sink, absorbing and retaining carbon dioxide from the atmosphere.

Efforts to gain recognition of the wetland began in 2004, with support from the USAID Central African Regional Program for the Environment, the Ramsar Convention and the World Wide Fund for Nature (WWF). The WWF took a leading role in developing technical plans. Official recognition was formally announced in Kinshasa in July 2008. The WWF has said it plans to continue working with international partners and with local communities to preserve biodiversity through sustainable development in the landscape. The Lac Tumba-Ledira and Ngiri reserves are contained within the site, supporting research and helping raise awareness.

== People and economy ==
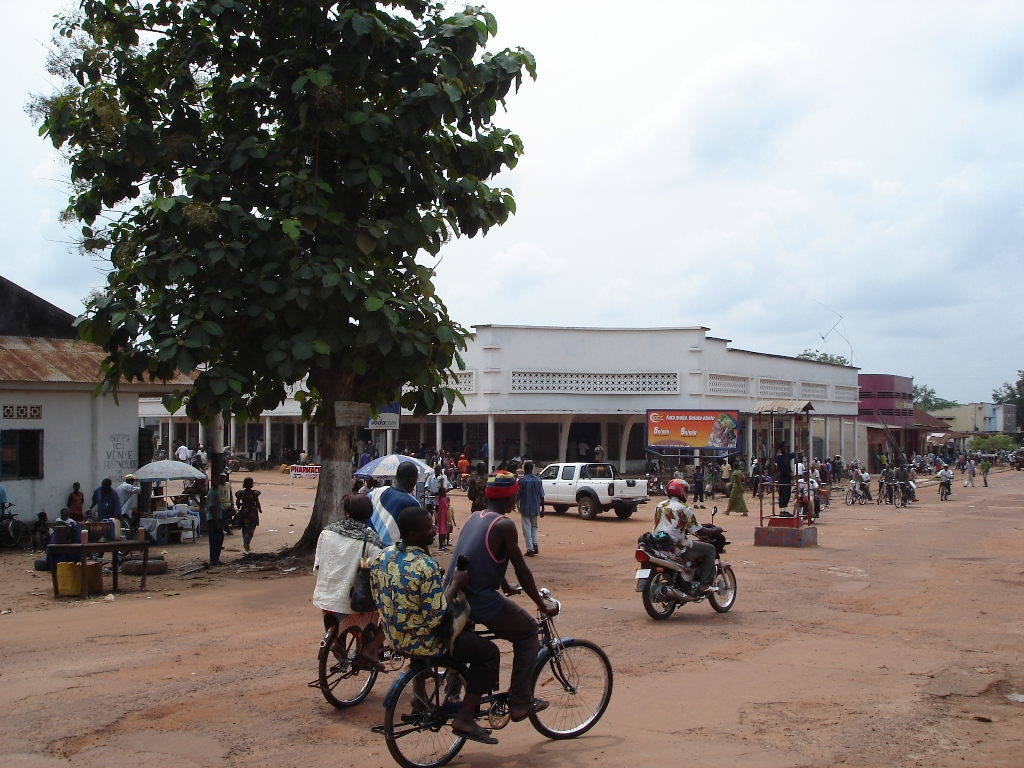
Mbandaka, at the center of the site

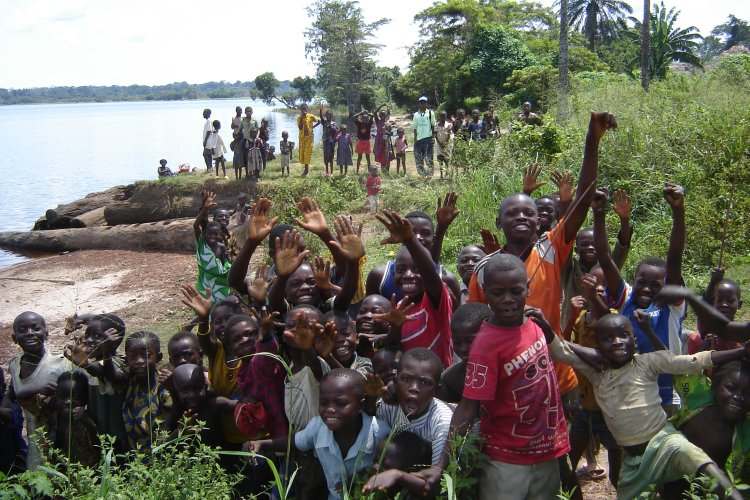
Children beside lake Maï Ndombe

The city of Mbandaka, capital of Équateur province with a population of around 750,000, is near the center of the Tumba-Ngiri-Maindombe site. The site also contains several smaller towns, mainly populated by Mongo people. Communities in the area grow cassava, sweet potatoes, sugarcane and bananas for local consumption. They produce palm oil, groundnuts and rice as cash crops, and catch fish for shipment to large cities in the region.

The people of the region are extremely poor and suffer from endemic local conflicts as well as food insecurity. 26 police and at least 100 civilians died, and tens of thousands were displaced, in the 2009 Dongo conflict over fishing and farming rights in the northwest of Équateur. The local population is growing at about 3% per year, one of the highest rates in the world, placing growing stress on natural resources. However, the region is still sparsely populated with 6–24 inhabitants per square kilometer. About 90% of the people outside the urban centers live on under $1 per day, and few have access to clean water. Maternal and infant mortality rates are high and diseases such as tuberculosis, malaria and HIV/AIDS are prevalent.

Governance in the region is weak and corruption is widespread. The central government does not provide funding to the provinces. Land tenure laws are poorly defined and applied. Laws regulating mining, agriculture and forest use are inconsistent and poorly enforced, causing conflict over rights to exploit resources. Logging concessions do not recognise traditional land rights and are causing unsustainable degradation of the forests. Other threats come from the expansion of oil palm plantations, commercial farms and from urbanization.

Most of the people have little or no education. They use unsustainable quantities of firewood and charcoal as their main source of energy, and contribute to forest degradation through slash-and-burn cultivation. Fish stocks are declining due to overfishing using fine-mesh nets, including mosquito nets. Illegal bushmeat hunting and trapping to meet demand from the towns and cities is causing wildlife populations to decline. José Endundo Bononge, DRC Minister of Environment, says:

"The enemy of the forest is its misery and poverty… We cannot maintain and protect this forest with a miserable people, a poor population, who has no schools, no health care centres, no drinking water and no electricity".

Between 75% and 95% of rainfall in the Congo Basin is thought to be recycled as water vapor rises from the forests and marshes and falls again as rain. Rainfall has declined in recent years. It is possible that a vicious cycle is setting in where degradation of the swamps and forest is causing reduced precipitation, which in turn is causing further degradation.

== See also ==
Climate change in the Democratic Republic of the Congo
