= Boundji =

- Location in the Republic of the Congo
- Coordinates: 1°1′35″S 15°20′52″E
- Country: Republic of the Congo
- Department: Cuvette
- District: Boundji
- Elevation: 1,175 ft (358 m)

Population (2023 census)
  - Total: 16,637

Boundji is a town in the Cuvette Department of central Republic of the Congo. It is the administrative seat of the Boundji District.

The city is served by Boundji Airport.

== Average weather conditions of boundji ==
The average temperature of Boundji is 32 degrees. Throughout the year, the average drop in temperature is 30 and rise is 32.

The best time to visit Boundji is from June to August as during these months the weather is said to be very pleasant.
