= Mossaka District =

Mossaka
- District
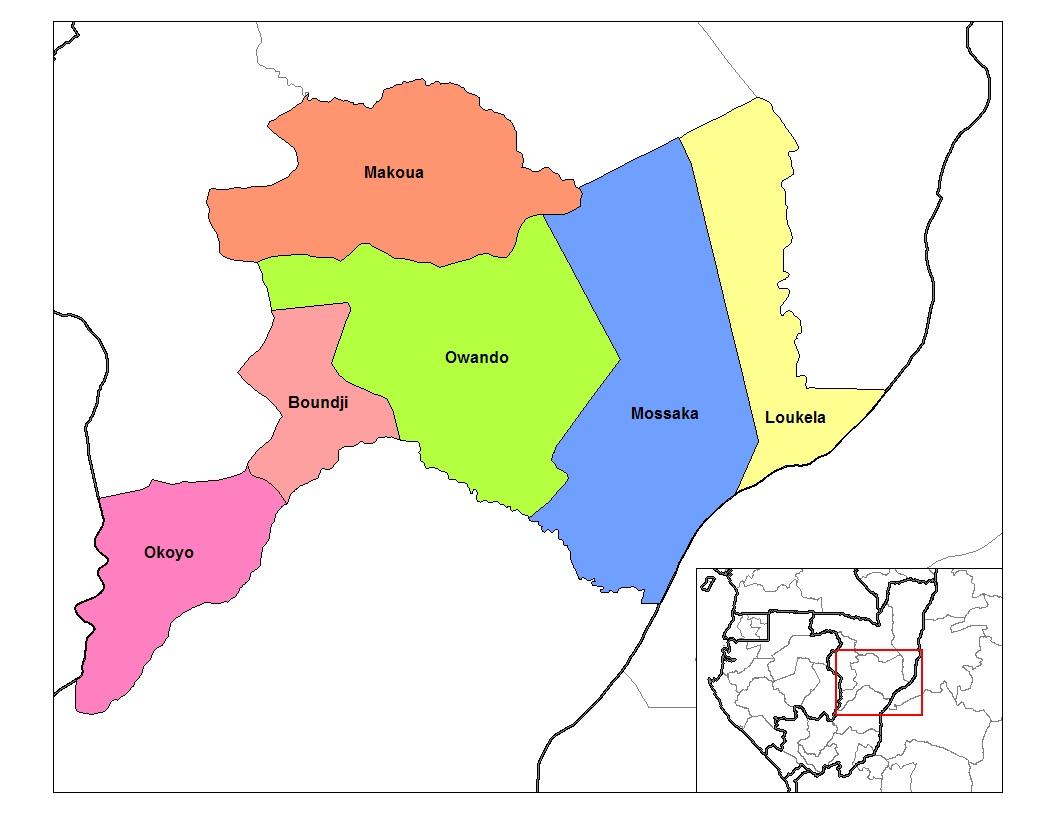
- Mossaka District as it existed in Cuvette Department prior to 2024
- Coordinates: 1.224167°S 16.793889°E
- Country: Republic of the Congo
- Department: Congo-Oubangui

Area
  - Total: 9,853 km^{2} (3,804 sq mi)
- Elevation: 299 m (981 ft)

Population (2023 census)
  - Total: 46,605
  - Density: 4.730/km^{2} (12.25/sq mi)
- Time zone: UTC+1 (GMT +1)

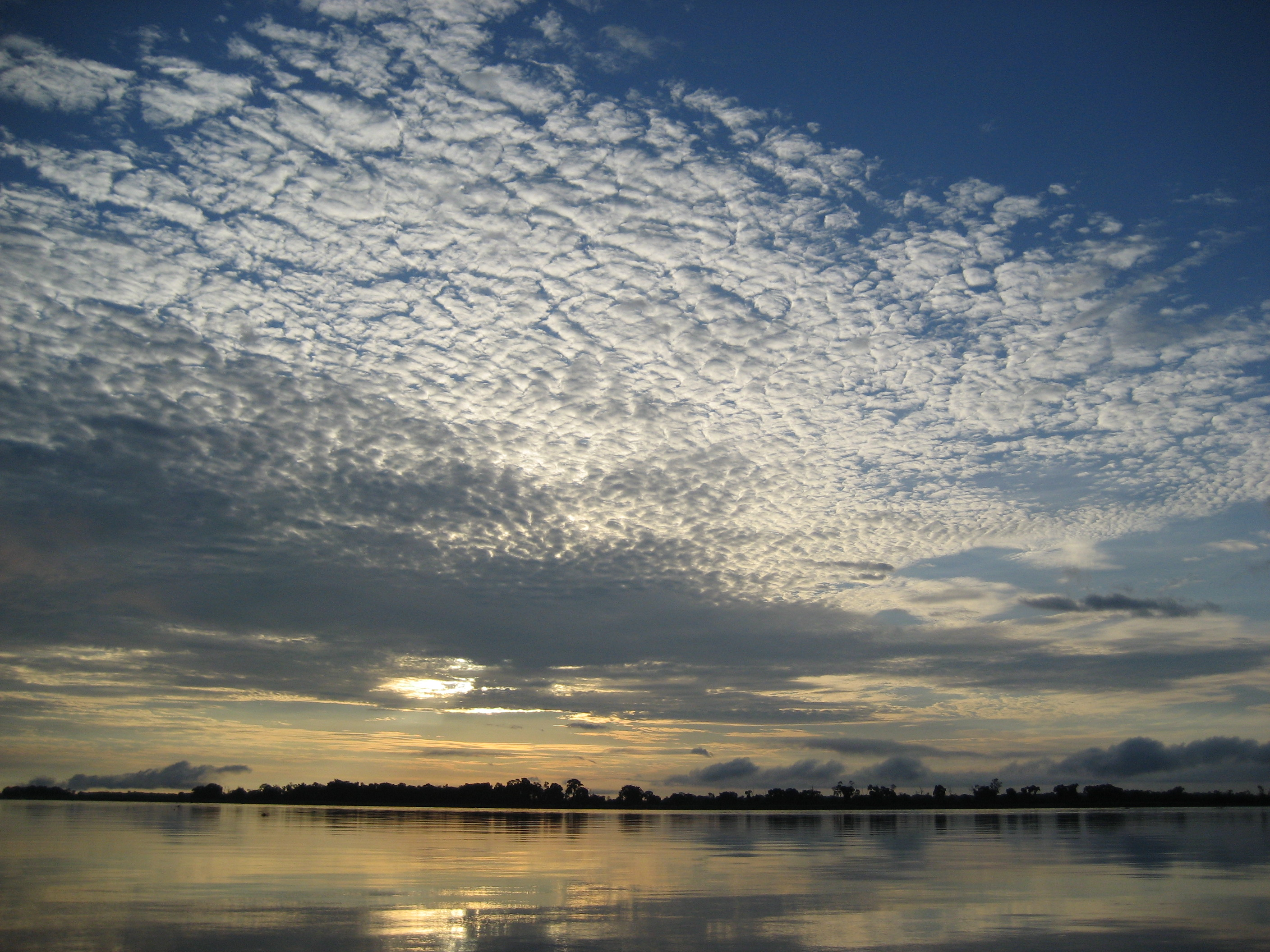
The Congo River near Mossaka.

Mossaka is a district in the department of Congo-Oubangui of the Republic of the Congo. The capital lies at Mossaka, which is also the capital of Congo-Oubangui.
