= Tchikapika District =

Tchikapika
- District
- Location within Republic of the Congo
- Coordinates: 1.2613°S 16.1708°E
- Country: Republic of the Congo
- Region: Cuvette Department

Area
  - Total: 807 sq mi (2,089 km^{2})

Population (2023 census)
  - Total: 9,492
  - Density: 11.77/sq mi (4.544/km^{2})
- Time zone: UTC+1 (GMT +1)

Tchikapika is a district in the Cuvette Department of Republic of the Congo.
