= Environmental issues in the Democratic Republic of the Congo =

Environmental issues in the Democratic Republic of the Congo are the consequence of compounding social and economic problems, including lack of access to clean energy, clearing of lands for agriculture and economic development, and armed conflict. Major environmental issues in DRC include deforestation, poaching, which threatens wildlife populations, water pollution and mining.

A dense tropical rainforest in the DRC's central river basin and eastern highlands is bordered on the east by the Albertine Rift (the western branch of Africa's Great Rift System). It includes several of Africa's Great Lakes.

The civil war and resulting in poor economic conditions have endangered much of this biodiversity. Many park wardens were either killed or could not afford to continue their work. The five national parks, the Garumba, Kahuzi-Biega, Salonga and Virunga National Parks, and Okapi Wildlife Reserve, are listed by UNESCO as World Heritage in Danger.

Displaced refugees cause or are otherwise responsible for significant deforestation, soil erosion and wildlife poaching. Another significant issue is environmental damage from the mining of minerals, especially diamonds, gold, and coltan – a mineral used to manufacture capacitors.

== Species and biodiversity loss ==
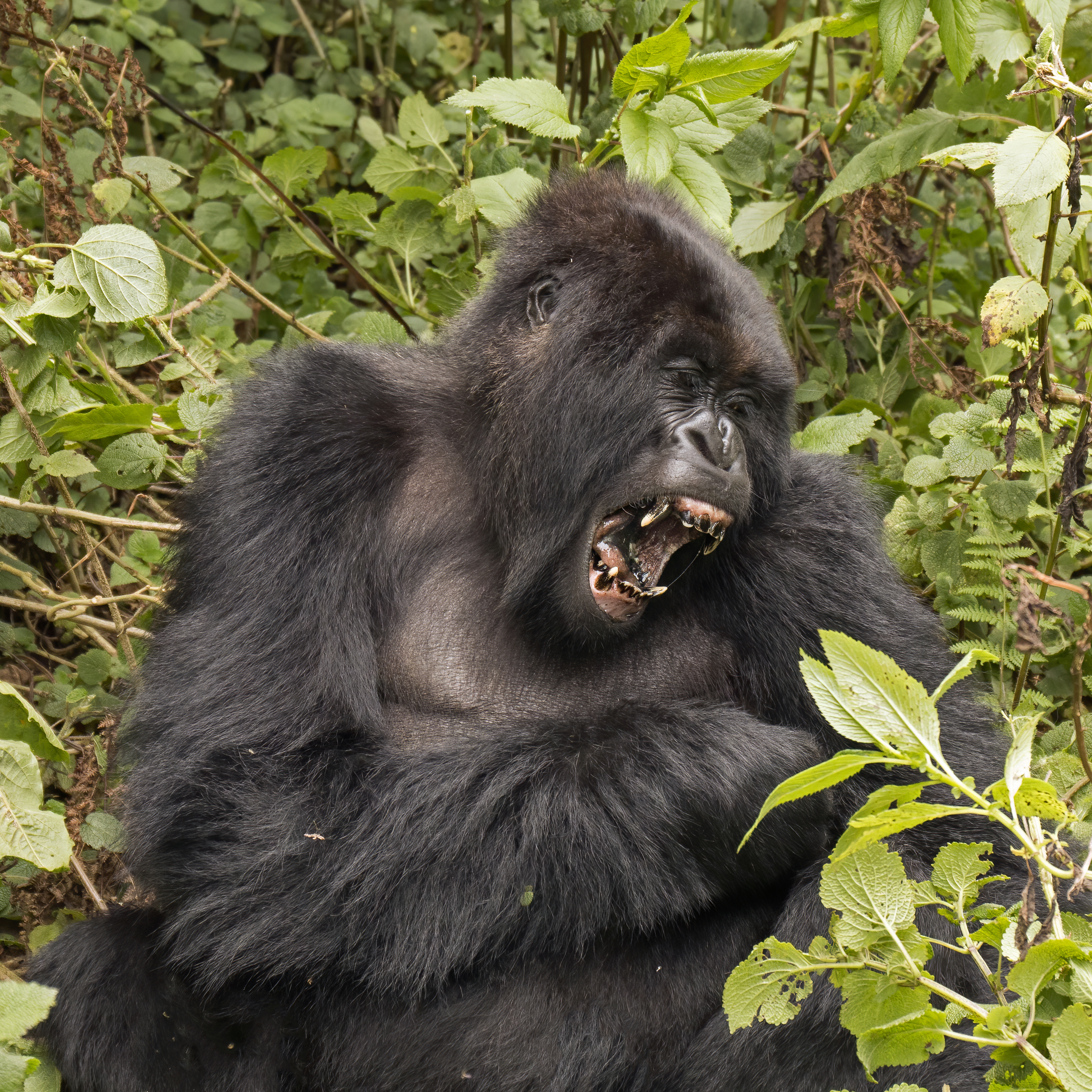
The endangered mountain gorilla; half of its population live in the DRC's Virunga National Park, making the park a critical habitat for these animals.

The environmental problems associated with the DRC affect its many endemic species of flora and fauna. The DRC has the world's second largest contiguous rain forest after the Amazon as well as other ecosystems including Savanna, swamps and flood plains. According to the World Wildlife Fund, these unique habitats and species make the DRC one of the most valuable yet vulnerable areas in the world for biodiversity, wildlife protection and rainforest sustainability.

Species loss has been cited as a problem in the DRC, brought about or exacerbated by reasons that include deforestation for mining, wood fuel, infrastructure or agriculture, war, illegal poaching and increased consumption of bush meat due to overpopulation and lack of food security. Some attempts to combat species loss in countries such as the DRC are actions such as the UN's Sustainable Development Goals (SDG), specifically SDG 15 Life on Land, the primary goals of which is to increase reforestation and biodiversity and reduce species loss, desertification, and illegal poaching. One of the primary defences for species and habitat protection in the DRC is its system of national parks and reserves, which gives protected status to nearly 12% of the DRC's rainforest. Five of these parks and reserves are UNESCO World Heritage Sites, including Africa's first national park Virunga national park. All of these parks have been put on the World Heritage in Danger List. Poor governance and low economic conditions have reduced the effectiveness of these protections, especially during war times. The human cost of protecting these parks has also been high with 200 park ranger deaths in the past 20 years. Virunga national park and Salongo National Park, both of which are UNESCO World Heritage Sites are currently being looked at for mining and oil exploration. The move would open 21.5% of the Virunga park for exploitation, this is highly criticised by animal rights activists as it would threaten the habitat of mountain gorillas and other endangered species.

== Deforestation ==
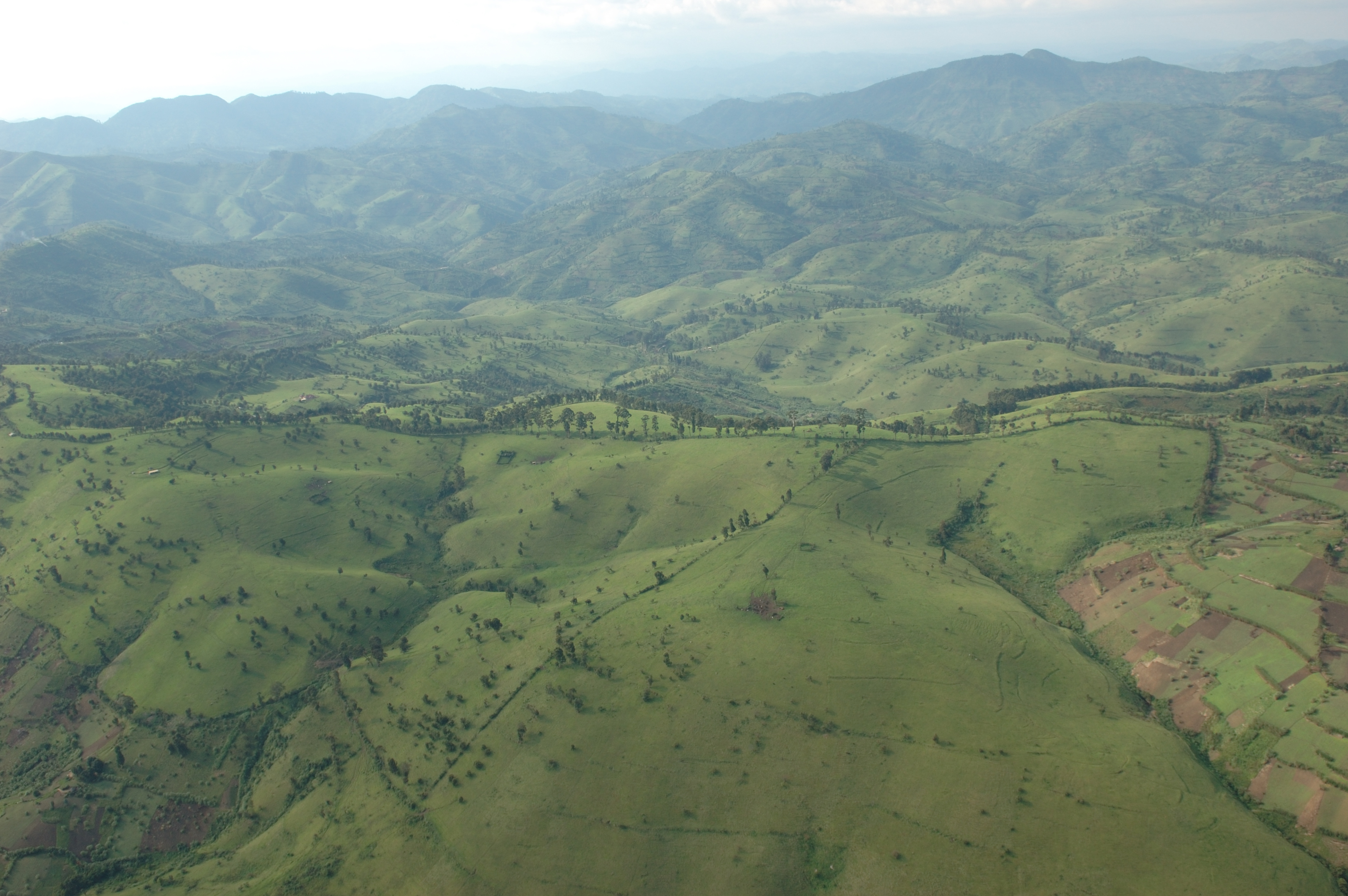
Deforested lands in the DRC

Between 2000 and 2014, the DRC lost an average of 570,000 hectares (0.2%) of rainforest to deforestation per year, with the highest amount of deforestation coming between 2011 and 2014. Deforestation is the primary cause of biodiversity reduction and species loss globally, through habitat loss and fragmentation. One of the goals of the SDG 15 is to reduce deforestation and encourage reforestation by 2020. The DRC had a 2018 Forest Landscape Integrity Index mean score of 7.56/10, ranking it 36th globally out of 172 countries.

The DRC has Africa's largest rainforest, which is under the threat of deforestation through mining operations, agriculture, infrastructure and wood fuel. In the DRC 94% of wood taken from the rainforest is used for wood fuel, mainly due to poverty, lack of energy infrastructure and the decentralised nature of its population. To mitigate this aid agencies have tried to promote agro-forestry with fast growing trees to avoid over exploitation of the rainforests. Other large drivers of deforestation include mining and conflict, during the Congo conflict deforestation by militia groups was high for wood fuel, small mining operations and illegal logging to fund their operations. However, conversely conflict reduced deforestation for large scale mining due to security instability.

One policy being attempted to reduce the deforestation and increase biodiversity in the DRC is the UN-REDD program, which uses emissions trading system so that developed nations can offset their carbon emissions by paying developing nations with rainforest to manage and conserve their forest.

== Bush meat ==
Bush meat refers to any meat that is procured from the wild. Overpopulation and continual conflicts in the DRC have led to food shortages, which have therefore increased the use of bush meat. Although data on bush meat use is not extensive, studies estimate 6 million tonnes of animals are taken for bush meat globally each year. What animals are hunted are done so indiscriminately without thought of the importance of certain species that could be ecosystem engineers or keystone species.

Bush meat is an important source of protein for millions in the DRC, especially in rural areas where it makes up 50–70% of meals. For some who cannot afford farmed produce it is a free meal. A recent study in the DRC revealed that almost all of the animals are taken from the Congo each year, at 93% of all live animals there are in the forest are extracted for bush meat, whereas a sustainable rate would be 20%. This is a huge amount compared to the Amazon where bush meat is hunted at only 3% the rate of the Congo. the study reveals the only way to solve this is to find other food sources to feed people in the Congo Basin as bush meat is their only means of eating. Another study showed that the species of bush meat in the meat markets of the DRC's third largest city Kisangani were primarily Artiodactyla at 40.06% of the carcasses sold then primates at 37.79% of carcasses sold.

Recently the prevalence of hunting for bush meat has declined because of the risk to hunters and butchers from the Ebola virus from specifically ape and bat meat. Even though when the meat is cooked smoked or dried it kills the virus, business has dropped significantly with some hunters reporting as much of a reduction in sales of 80%.

== Poaching ==
Poaching for the exotic animal or ivory trade has been a persistent problem for species loss in the DRC; for some it has been a means of escaping poverty, while for some rebel groups, such as the Lord's Resistance Army (LRA), it is a means of continuing the civil war. The forest elephant is particularly at risk due to the high cost of its ivory, especially in the Far East, which led to a 62% decrease in population in 2002–2011 The main way this poaching for ivory can be reduced is through the hampering of the international demand for ivory, as this drives the trade.

The introduction of park guards and the implementation of eco-tourism in Virunga National park, a primary habitat for great apes, has allowed the endangered mountain gorilla population to jump over 1000, a 25% rise on 2010 numbers. However, the study indicated that poaching is still an existing problem, with researchers finding 380 snares and park guards continually being ambushed and killed by poachers.

== Impact of war ==
There has been a war in the DRC in different levels of intensity since 1994 when the country was called Zaire. Although what was known as Africa's World War had ended in 2003 the eastern part of the country still has ongoing skirmishes between rebel groups and government forces. No other method has reduced species population so dramatically than conflict, when a militia reached the Garamba National Park in 1997, within three months half of the park's elephants, two thirds of the buffalo, and three quarters of its hippos vanished. The reason conflict is so damaging to wildlife is the increased use of bush meat to feed soldiers, the prevalence of weapons, the lucrative industry of selling exotic animals and ivory as well as the general failure of law and order. According to another study which was taken during the time of the civil war in the Okapi Faunal Reserve, there was a 50% reduction in the abundance of elephants and a vast change in the distribution of them to the more secluded areas of the park.
