= Cuvette Department =

Department of the Republic of the Congo

Coordinates: 0°29′S 15°54′E

Cuvette
- Department
- Cuvette, department of the Republic of the Congo
- Country: Republic of the Congo
- Capital: Owando

Area
  - Total: 48,250 km^{2} (18,630 sq mi)

Population (2023 census)
  - Total: 316,599
  - Density: 6.562/km^{2} (16.99/sq mi)
- HDI (2018): 0.580 medium · 3rd of 12

Cuvette is a department of the Republic of the Congo in the central part of the country. It borders the departments of Cuvette-Ouest, Likouala, Plateaux, and Sangha, and internationally, the Democratic Republic of the Congo. The capital is Owando. Cities and towns include Boundji, Makoua and Okoyo.

== Administrative divisions ==
Cuvette Department is divided into one commune and nine districts:

=== Districts ===
1. Makoua District
2. Boundji District
3. Mossaka District
4. Loukoléla District
5. Oyo District
6. Ngoko District
7. Ntokou District
8. Tchikapika District
9. Bokoma District

=== Communes ===
1. Commune of Owando
