= Loukoléla District =

Loukoléla
- District
- Interactive map of Loukoléla
- Coordinates: 1°S 17.1°E
- Country: Republic of the Congo
- Department: Congo-Oubangui
- Time zone: UTC+1 (GMT +1)

Loukoléla is a district in the department of Congo-Oubangui of the Republic of the Congo.
