= Likouala-Mossaka =

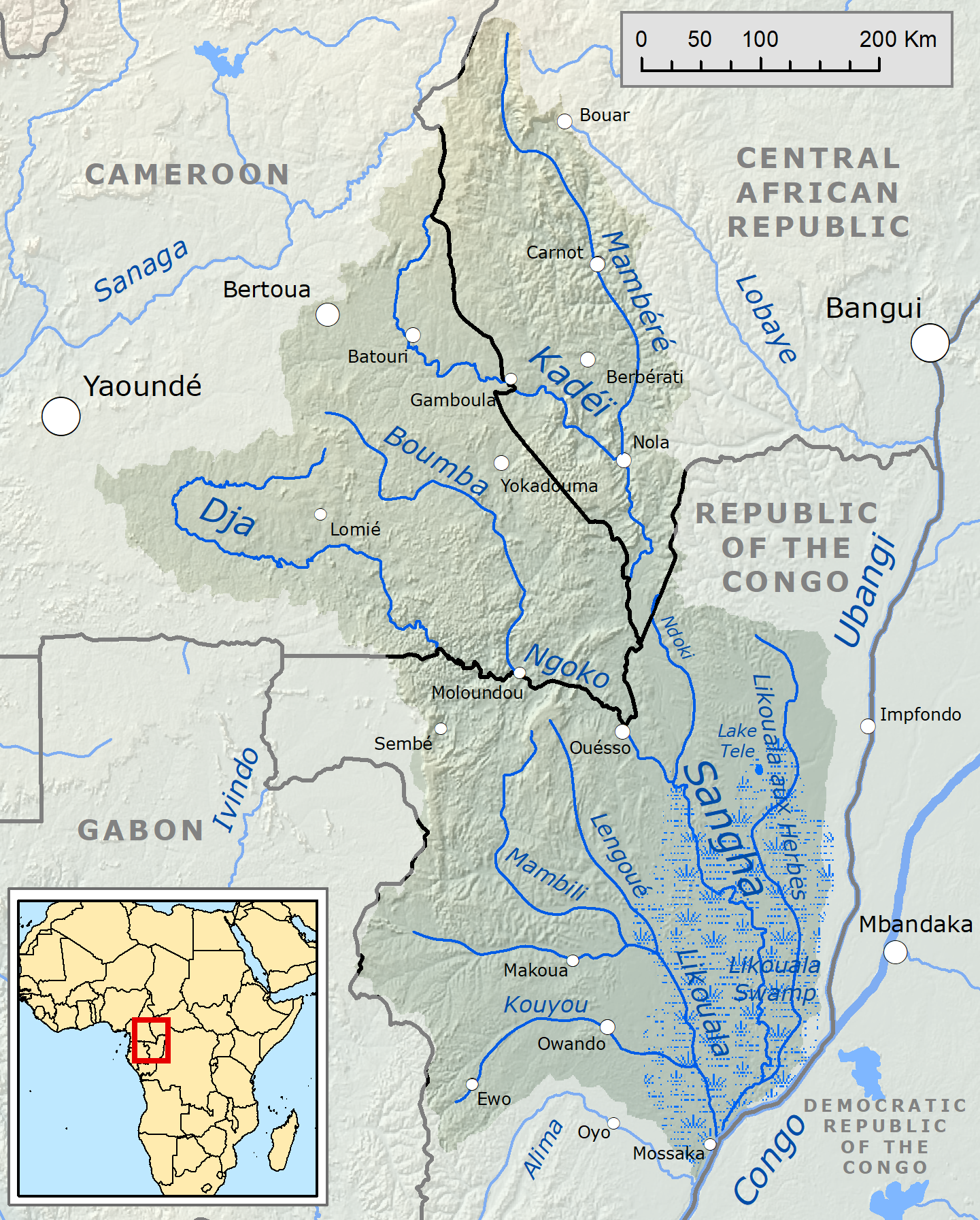
- Sangha River basin, showing the Likouala to the west

- Location within Republic of the Congo

Location
- Country: Republic of the Congo

Physical characteristics
- Mouth: Congo River
  - location: Mossaka
  - coordinates: 1.2270°S 16.7991°E

The Likouala-Mossaka (or Likouala River) (Swahili: Mto Likouala) is a river in the Republic of the Congo. It is a tributary of the Congo River, which it enters to the east of the town of Mossaka.

== Location ==
The Likouala-Mossaka is a right tributary of the Congo into which it flows at Mossaka about 650 kilometres (400 mi) from its source. Its basin adjoins that of the Sangha River to the north and the Ogooué River in Gabon to the west. To the south it adjoins the basin of the Alima, which has hardly any left tributaries. The lower Sangha, the Likouala-aux-Herbes and Likouala-Mossaka rivers flow through the Congolese Cuvette, a huge depression with an equatorial climate. The soil of this region is sandy or clayey quaternary fluvial alluvia. Vegetation is dense, humid, shady forest that partly floods during the high water season.

== Hydrology ==
Between 1951 and 1993 annual rainfall in the Likouala-Mossaka basin was 1,689 millimetres (66.5 in) and average discharge at the Makoua gauging station was 216 cubic metres per second (7,600 cu ft/s). The basin above this point covered 14,100 square kilometres (5,400 sq mi).

== European exploration ==
Pierre Savorgnan de Brazza explored the upper part of the Likouala-Mossaka, the Licona, in August 1878. Albert Dolisie entered its mouth in 1884. Giacomo Savorgnan di Brazzà descended the river when he returned from his exploration of the north in December 1885. In 1899 the whole Likouala-Mossaka basin was granted to the Tréchot brothers who had created the Compagnie Française du Haut-Congo (CFHC) for its operation. In 1908 there were four administrative posts in a territory of about 80,000 square kilometres (31,000 sq mi). Seventy-two villages had to pay 44,648 francs in taxes. Until 1909 the French administration of the Likouala-Mossaka basin was very light, and little had been done to develop its resources.

== Sources ==
- Laraque, Alain; Mahé, Gil; Orange, Didier; Marieu, Bertrand (2001), "Spatiotemporal variations in hydrological regimes within Central Africa during the XXth century" (PDF), Journal of Hydrology (245): 104–117
- Mazenot, Georges (1966), "L'occupation du Bassin de la Likouala-Mossaka 1909-1914" (PDF), Cahiers d'études africaines, 6 (22): 268–307, doi:10.3406/cea.1966.3067
