= Central Teke language =

Teke language of Congo

Central Teke
- Native to: Congo, Democratic Republic of the Congo
- Native speakers: (45,000 Ngungwel cited 1988); 20,000 Boo (2000)
- Language family: Niger–Congo?: Atlantic–Congo; Benue–Congo; Southern Bantoid; Bantu (Zone B); Teke (B.70); Central Teke
- Dialects: Ngungwel; Mpu (Mpumpu); Boo (Eboo); Ndzindziu

Language codes
- ISO 639-3: Variously: ngz – Ngungwel ebo – Boo nzu – Nzikou
- Glottolog: ngun1278
- Guthrie code: B.72,74

Central Teke is a member of the Teke languages dialect continuum of the Congolese plateau. Central Teke dialects are Ngungwel and Mpu (Mpumpum), Boo (Boma, Eboo – cf. Boma language), and Nzikou (Njyunjyu/Ndzindziu). They are spoken in the Malebo Pool region of the Republic of Congo, with an unknown number of Boo speakers in DRC.

== Phonology ==
=== Consonants ===
		Labial	Alveolar	Palatal	Velar	Glottal
Plosive	voiceless	p	t		k	
Plosive	voiced	b	d		ɡ	
Plosive	prenasal vl.	ᵐp	ⁿt		ᵑk	
Plosive	prenasal vd.	ᵐb	ⁿd		ᵑɡ	
Affricate	voiceless	p͡f	t͡s			
Affricate	voiced	b͡v	d͡z			
Affricate	prenasal vl.	ᵐp͡f	ⁿt͡s			
Affricate	prenasal vd.	ᵐb͡v	ⁿd͡z			
Fricative		f	s	ʃ		h
Nasal		m	n	ɲ	ŋ	
Lateral			l			
Approximant		ɥ		j	w	

- /h/ is only heard in the Nzikou dialect.

=== Vowels ===
	Front	Central	Back
Close	i ĩ		u ũ
Close	ɪ ɪ̃		ʊ ʊ̃
Close-mid	e		o
Open-mid	ɛ ɛ̃		ɔ ɔ̃
Open		a ã	

- /u/ when preceding a palatal /j/ is heard as [ʉ], and when preceding a /w/ is heard as [y].

== Grammar ==
In Teke-Eboo, verbs agree with their subject, and also take markers for tense and aspect. This marking is distributed across the forms of the subject marker, and the final vowel that the verb takes, along with changes to the tone of the verb. There are two past tenses, a recent past, used for events within the past day, and a general past. There is also a future tense. The future tense and the two past tenses use the same segmental agreement prefixes, but they differ in tone, both on the prefix itself, and on the tonal melody they apply to the verb stem, which also interacts with the verb stem's underlying lexical tone. Verbs in the consecutive, or narrative present (which can be considered unmarked for tense) take segmentally different subject prefixes. There are also past tense and future tense marking auxiliaries, which do not agree with the subject, and are optional, preceding the fully inflected verb.

These examples demonstrate the tonal contrasts in verb forms marking the recent past, general past, and future. Additionally, the final vowel is raised to i in the past perfective. This also shows a change in noun class of the object, to mark a contrast in number, a typical feature of Bantu languages.

Ndyɛ́ [á-dzw-i / ǎ-dzw-i᷈ / â-dzw-á] [ntaali / a-ntaali].
3S [3S.REC-kill-PFV / 3S.PST-kill-PFV / 3S.FUT-kill-FV] [C1.snake / C2-snake]
"He [killed(recently) / killed / will kill] the [snake / snakes]."

The verb in this example is marked for aspect with the prefix ma-. In the past tense, most verbs take a close vowel as their final vowel, but the presence of an aspect marker blocks this.

Taará á-ma-fur-a lí-kɔ́ɔlɔ.
C1.dad C1.PST-ALREADY-pay-FV C5-school
"Dad has already paid for schooling."
