= Mbuun language =

Bantu language spoken in DR Congo

Mbuun
- Mpuun
- Native to: DR Congo
- Native speakers: (165,000 cited 1972)
- Language family: Niger–Congo?: Atlantic–Congo; Benue–Congo; Bantoid; Bantu (Zone B); Teke (B.70) (traditionally Tiene–Yanzi, B.80); Mbuun

Language codes
- ISO 639-3: zmp
- Glottolog: mpuo1241
- Guthrie code: B.84

Mbuun or Mpuun, is a Bantu language spoken by several hundred thousand people in the Democratic Republic of Congo. The name is sometimes spelled Kimbuun or Gimbunda. Mpuono has been spuriously conflated with it in some sources.

== Literature ==
Two Gospels were translated by E. and A. Haller, both of Mission de Mangungu. The Gospel of John was published in 1935, as Lasang Labve la afun kangi Yone; and the Gospel of Matthew in 1951, as Lasang Labve lafun Matayo. These were published by the Société Biblique Britannique et Étrangère (British and Foreign Bible Society). A collection of proverbs with French translations and explanations has been published.
