= North Teke language =

Bantu dialect continuum of Central Africa

North Teke
- Tɛgɛ
- Native to: Congo, Gabon
- Native speakers: (140,000 cited 2000–2011)
- Language family: Niger–Congo?: Atlantic–Congo; Benue–Congo; Southern Bantoid; Bantu (Zone B); Teke (B.70); North Teke

Language codes
- ISO 639-3: teg
- Glottolog: teke1275
- Guthrie code: B.71

North Teke, or Tɛgɛ (Tege, Teghe, Itege), is a member of the Teke languages dialect continuum of the Congolese plateau.

== Phonology ==
=== Consonants ===
		Labial	Alveolar	Palatal	Velar
Plosive	voiceless	p	t		k
Plosive	voiced	b	d		ɡ
Plosive	prenasal vl.	ᵐp	ⁿt		ᵑk
Plosive	prenasal vd.	ᵐb	ⁿd		ᵑɡ
Affricate	voiceless	p͡f	t͡s	t͡ʃ	
Affricate	voiced	b͡v	d͡z~d͡ʒ		
Affricate	prenasal vl.	ᶬp͡f	ⁿt͡s~ⁿt͡ʃ		
Affricate	prenasal vd.	ᶬb͡v	ⁿd͡z~ⁿd͡ʒ		
Fricative	voiceless	f	s	ʃ	
Fricative	voiced	v			(ɣ)
Fricative	prenasal vl.	ᶬf			
Fricative	prenasal vd.	ᶬv			
Nasal		m	n	ɲ	ŋ
Rhotic	tap		ɾ		
Rhotic	trill		r		
Approximant		w	l	j	

- /b/ can also be heard as [ɓ] in free variation.
- /ɡ/ can be heard as [ɣ] when in between vowels.
- Sounds /d͡ʒ, ⁿt͡ʃ, ⁿd͡ʒ/ can also be heard as alveolar [d͡z, ⁿt͡s, ⁿd͡z] in free variation.
- The following sounds can be labialized as [bʷ, kʷ, fʷ, sʷ, d͡zʷ, ɲʷ, lʷ, mʷ, ᵐbʷ, ⁿt͡ʃʷ, ⁿd͡ʒʷ, ᵑkʷ, ᵑɡʷ].
- The labialized sounds /kʷ, ᵑkʷ/ can also be heard as [k͡p, ᵑk͡p].
- The following sounds can be palatalized as [pʲ, bʲ, kʲ, fʲ, sʲ, t͡sʲ, lʲ, mʲ, ᵐpʲ, ᵐbʲ, ⁿt͡ʃʲ].

=== Vowels ===
	Front	Central	Back
Close	i		u
Close-mid	e		o
Open-mid	ɛ		ɔ
Open		a	

- Sounds /i, a, u/ can be heard as [ɪ, ə, ʊ] in lax position.

== Alphabet ==
North Teke alphabet
Uppercase	A	B	D	DZ	E	F	G	I	K	L	M	N	NY	Ŋ	O	P	PF	R	S	T	TS	U	V	W	Y
Lowercase	a	b	d	dz	e	f	g	i	k	l	m	n	ny	ŋ	o	p	pf	r	s	t	ts	u	v	w	y
