= Labial affricate =

Labial affricate may refer to:

- Voiceless labiodental affricate, a consonant sound written as ⟨p̪f⟩
- Voiced labiodental affricate, a consonant sound written as ⟨b̪v⟩
