= Kwe language =

Kwe may be:

- Tshwa language
- Kwe dialect

== See also ==
- Kpwe language spoken by Kwe people
