= West Teke language =

Bantu dialect continuum of Central Africa

West Teke
- Native to: Republic of Congo, Gabon
- Ethnicity: Teke, Bongo Pygmies
- Native speakers: (120,000 cited ca.2000) (some figures undated)
- Language family: Niger–Congo?: Atlantic–Congo; Benue–Congo; Bantoid; Bantu (Zone B); Nzebi (B.50) (traditionally Teke, B.70); West Teke

Language codes
- ISO 639-3: Variously: tyi – Tsaayi lli – Laali iyx – Yaa tyx – Tyee (Kwe)
- Glottolog: west2969 West Kasai-Ngounie
- Guthrie code: B.73

West Teke is a Bantu language spoken in the Republic of Congo and Gabon.

West Teke is a dialect continuum. The varieties are Tsaayi (Ge-Tsaya, Tyaye, Tsayi), Laali, Yaa (Yaka), and Tyee (Tee, Kwe). The dominant variety by far is Tsaayi.

== Phonology ==
=== Consonants ===
		Labial	Alveolar	Palatal	Velar	Labio- velar	Glottal
Nasal		m	n	ɲ	ŋ	ŋ͡m	
Plosive	voiceless	p	t		k	k͡p	
Plosive	voiced	b	d		ɡ		
Plosive	prenasal vl.	ᵐp	ⁿt		ᵑk	ᵑk͡p	
Plosive	prenasal vd.	ᵐb	ⁿd		ᵑɡ	ᵑɡ͡b	
Affricate	voiceless	p͡f	t͡s				
Affricate	voiced	b͡v	d͡z				
Affricate	prenasal vl.	ᵐp͡f	ⁿt͡s				
Affricate	prenasal vd.	ᵐb͡v	ⁿd͡z				
Fricative		f	s		ɣ		h
Rhotic			ɾ				
Approximant		(ɥ)	l	j		w	

- Sounds /k͡p, ᵑk͡p, ᵑɡ͡b/ are sometimes pronounced as labialized sounds [kʷ, ᵑkʷ, ᵑɡʷ].
- /ɡ/ when preceding /w/ or /j/, may labialize or palatalize as [ɡʷ, ɡʲ].
- /s/ may often be pronounced as [ʃ] when before /u/ or /w/.
- /j/ when preceding a /w/ or /u/, is pronounced as a labial-palatal [ɥ].
- /t͡s, ⁿt͡s, d͡z, ⁿd͡z/ may also be pronounced as [t͡ʃ, ⁿt͡ʃ, d͡ʒ, ⁿd͡ʒ] when before /u/, /w/ or /j/.

=== Vowels ===
	Front	Central	Back
Close	i ĩ		u ũ
Close-mid	e		o
Open-mid	ɛ ɛ̃		ɔ ɔ̃
Open		a ã	

- Sounds /ɛ, ɔ/ may also be heard as more closed [e, o] in different positions.
- Vowel length is also distinctive.
