= Boma–Dzing languages =

Clade of Bantu languages

Boma–Dzing
- (Yanzi)
- Linguistic classification: Niger–Congo?: Atlantic–Congo; Benue–Congo; Southern Bantoid; Bantu (Zone B.80); Boma–Dzing

Language codes
- ISO 639-3: –
- Glottolog: None

The Boma–Dzing languages are a clade of Bantu languages coded Zone B.80 in Guthrie's classification. According to Nurse & Philippson (2003), some of Guthrie's B.80 (Tiene, Mfinu, Mpuono) are related to the Teke languages (B.70), and some Yansi varieties belong with the Yaka languages (H.30), but the rest form a valid node. They are:

- Boma: Boma, Mpe (Kempee), Nunu
- Ding: Ding (Dzing, Di), Ngul (including Ngwi), Lwel (Kelwer), Mpiin, West Ngongo, Nzadi
- Tsong
