= Kukuya language =

Bantu language spoken in DR Congo

Kukuya
- Southern Teke
- Native to: Republic of the Congo
- Region: Plateaux Department
- Native speakers: (39,000 cited 2000)
- Language family: Niger–Congo?: Atlantic–Congo; Benue–Congo; Southern Bantoid; Bantu (Zone B); Teke (B.70); Kukuya
- Writing system: unwritten

Language codes
- ISO 639-3: kkw
- Glottolog: teke1280
- Guthrie code: B.77a

The Kukuya language, Kikukuya [kìkýkȳā], also transcribed Kukẅa and known as Southern Teke, is a member of the Teke dialect continuum of the Congolese plateau. It is the only language known to have a phonemic labiodental nasal /ɱ/. The name of the language comes from the word kuya "plateau".

== Phonology ==
=== Vowels ===
	Front		Central		Back	
	short	long	short	long	short	long
Close	i	iː			u	uː
Mid	e̞	e̞ː			o̞	o̞ː
Open			ä	äː		

- /e̞, o̞/ range from close-mid [e, o] to open-mid [ɛ, ɔ].
- /u/ is realised as [y] in /ɲuni/ [ɲyni] and before [j, y], as in e.g. Kikukuya /kìkúkūjā/ [kìkýkȳā].

=== Consonants ===
			Bilabial	Labio- dental	Alveolar		Palatal	Velar	Glottal
			Bilabial	Labio- dental	plain	sibilant	Palatal	Velar	Glottal
Nasal			m	ɱʷ	n		ɲ	ŋ	
Plosive/ Affricate	oral	voiceless	p	pf	t	ts		k ~ ɡ	
Plosive/ Affricate	oral	voiced	b	bv	d	dz		k ~ ɡ	
Plosive/ Affricate	prenasal	aspirated	ᵐpʰ	ᶬpfʰ	ⁿtʰ	ⁿtsʰ		ᵑkʰ	
Plosive/ Affricate	prenasal	voiced	ᵐb	ᶬbv	ⁿd	ⁿdz		ᵑɡ	
Fricative				f		s	z ~ j		(h)
Approximant					l		z ~ j	w	

Prenasalized voiceless consonants are aspirated. Depending on speaker and region, the sound represented by ⟨y⟩ may be either [j] or [z], apart from the word "with", which is always [jà]. The labiodental nasal is realized as [ɱʷ] before /a/ and as [ɱ] before /i/ and /e/; Paulian (1975) suggests that this is due to a conflict between labialization and the spread front vowels. The velar stop is [k] word initially and typically [ɡ] between vowels; there is a similar alternation with [t] and [ɾ]. /mpf/, /ɱʷ/, /n/ and especially /d/ are uncommon. /h/ is found in a single highly frequent word, /hé/ ('also').

Cw sequences are rare and only occur before unrounded vowels; they include /tw/ [tɕɥ], /sw/ [ɕɥ], /ndzw/ [ndʒɥ], /jw/ [ʑɥ], /kw/ [kɥ]. (C cannot be /f, l/.) It may be possible that the frequent sounds [pf, bv, ɱʷ] (which occur before /i a u, i e a u, i e a/, respectively) are phonemically /pw, bw, mw/, but Paulian (1975) argues against this analysis. [ɱʷ] corresponds to [ŋ͡m ~ ŋʷ] in neighboring Teke languages. Cj sequences such as /pj, kj/ are also rare (a dozen cases) and only occur before /a/. It may be possible that the frequent sounds [ts, dz, ɲ] are phonemically /tj, dj, nj/, but they are not restricted as to following vowels and Paulian (1975) argues against this analysis. Diachronically, Kukwa affricates derive from stops before close vowels or vowel sequences, and /pf/ derives from *k rather than *p. The labiodentals are not found before /o/. /n/ is not attested before /u/, and /ŋ/ is not found in underived words before /i, u/.

Prenasalized affricates are generally transcribed mf, mv, ns, nz. Phonemic neutralization may occur when consonants are prenasalized:

N + /p, w/ → /mp/
N + /pf, f/ → /ɱp̪f/ ("mf")
N + /d, l/ → /nd/
N + /ts, s/ → /nts/ ("ns")
N + /dz, j/ → /ndz/ ("nz")

Syllables are primarily CV, with some CwV and CjV; vowel-initial syllables do not occur. Roots (not counting nominal prefixes and the like) are of the forms CV, CVV, CVCV, CVVCV, and CVCVCV. In the latter case, the middle vowel is neutralized. There are only six medial consonants, /k [ɡ], t [ɾ], n, m, l, p [b]/, and six combinations of medial C_{2}C_{3} in the case of CVCVCV words, /–n–m, –t–p, –t–k, –l–p, –l–k, ?/.

Paulian (1975) posits both tone and stress, with tone being high or low, though not every syllable is assigned a tone: there are five word-tone patterns in the language. Vowels may carry two tones to accomplish this.

=== The labiodental nasal ===
Kukuya is the only language known to have a phonemic labiodental nasal /ɱ/. It is "accompanied by strong protrusion of both lips", being [ɱʷ] before /a/ and [ɱ] before /i/ and /e/, perhaps because labialization is constrained by the spread front vowels; it does not occur before back (rounded) vowels. However, there is some doubt that a true stop can be made by this gesture due to gaps between the incisors, which are filed to points by the Teke people and would allow additional airflow during the occlusion; this is particularly pertinent considering that one of the words with this consonant, /ɱáá/, means a 'gap between filed incisors'.

Given its rarity, it is worth providing some minimal pairs with other consonants:

ɱíì eyes, míì urine, pfìí small opening
kì-mààlà to complete the rest, kì-ɱààlà to laugh at
ɱé they (class 4), bvé they (class 8), fè bulb, mfê the cold
kì-ɱànàmà to rejoice, kì-bvànàmà to shake with fear
ɱáá gap between filed incisors, mbváá interval
ɱáanà baby, mà-mbvàànì to meet
