= Fuumu language =

Bantu language spoken in Congo

Fuumu
- Wuumu
- Native to: Congo
- Region: Malebo Pool
- Native speakers: (8,200 cited 2000)
- Language family: Niger–Congo?: Atlantic–Congo; Benue–Congo; Southern Bantoid; Bantu (Zone B); Teke (B.70); Fuumu
- Dialects: Fuumu; Wuumu; Mpuono

Language codes
- ISO 639-3: ifm
- Glottolog: teke1274 wuum1239
- Guthrie code: B.77b, B.84

Fuumu is a member of the Teke languages dialect continuum of the Congolese plateau. The three dialects, Fuumu (Ifuumu), Wuumu (Iwuumu) and Mpuono, are sometimes considered separate languages. They are sometimes considered part of South Teke.

Mpuono has been spuriously conflated with Mbuun.
