= Tiene language =

Bantu language spoken in DR Congo

Tiene
- Tende
- Native to: DR Congo
- Native speakers: (24,000 cited 1977)
- Language family: Niger–Congo?: Atlantic–Congo; Benue–Congo; Bantoid; Bantu (Zone B); Teke (B.70) (previously Tiene-Yanzi, B.80); Tiene

Language codes
- ISO 639-3: tii
- Glottolog: tien1242
- Guthrie code: B.81

Tiene (Tiini), or Tende, is a Bantu language of the Democratic Republic of Congo.
