= Tsege language =

Bantu language spoken in Gabon

Tsege
- Tchitchege
- Native to: Gabon
- Native speakers: 2,000 (2003)
- Language family: Niger–Congo?: Atlantic–Congo; Benue–Congo; Southern Bantoid; Bantu (Zone B); Teke (B.70); Tsege

Language codes
- ISO 639-3: tck
- Glottolog: tchi1245
- Guthrie code: B.701
- ELP: Tchitchege

The Tsege language, Tchitchege, is a member of the Teke dialect continuum of the western Congo Basin.
