= Voiced labiodental nasal =

Consonantal sound represented by ⟨ɱ⟩ in IPA

ɱ

m̪
- IPA number: 115

Audio sample
- source · help

Encoding
- Entity (decimal): &#625;
- Unicode (hex): U+0271
- X-SAMPA: F
- Braille: ⠖ (braille pattern dots-235) ⠍ (braille pattern dots-134)
Image

A voiced labiodental nasal is a type of consonantal sound. The symbol in the International Phonetic Alphabet that represents this sound is ⟨ɱ⟩. The IPA symbol is a lowercase letter m with a leftward hook protruding from the lower right of the letter. Occasionally it is instead transcribed as an m with a dental diacritic: ⟨m̪⟩ (for example in extIPA, where the two transcriptions are presented as variants).

A labiodental pronunciation of [ɱ] is very similar to that of the bilabial nasal [m], but instead of the lips touching each other, the lower lip touches the upper teeth. The position of the lips and teeth is generally the same as for the production of the labiodental fricatives [f] and [v], though air escapes between the lip and the teeth in the case of the fricatives. Ladefoged & Maddieson (1996) note that due to gaps between the incisors, which would allow for additional airflow, it is not known if a 'true occlusive' can occur with this gesture, though it still patterns as one.

Although commonly appearing in languages, [ɱ] is overwhelmingly an allophone restricted to a position before the labiodental consonants [f] and [v]. A phonemic /ɱ/ has only been reported for the Kukuya language, where it contrasts with /m/ and is "accompanied by strong protrusion of both lips". It is [ɱʷ] before /a/ and [ɱ] before /i/ and /e/, perhaps because labialization is constrained by the spread front vowels; it does not occur before the back (rounded) vowels /o/ and /u/.

Nonetheless, [ɱ] is extremely common around the world phonetically, as it is the universal allophone of /m/ and a very common allophone of /n/ before the labiodental fricatives [f] and [v], as for example in English comfort and circumvent, and, for many people, infinitive and invent. In the Angami language, [ɱ] occurs as an allophone of /m/ before /ə/. In Drubea, [ɱ] is reported as an allophone of /v/ before nasal vowels.

A proposal to retire the letter ⟨ɱ⟩ was made in the run-up to the Kiel Convention of 1989, with the labiodental nasal to be transcribed solely by ⟨m̪⟩, but the proposal was defeated in committee. A recommendation by extIPA was retired soon afterwards in response.

== Features ==
Sagittal section of a voiced labiodental nasal

Features of a voiced labiodental nasal:

- Its manner of articulation is occlusive, which means it is produced by obstructing airflow in the vocal tract. Because the consonant is also nasal, the blocked airflow is redirected through the nose.
- Its place of articulation is labiodental, which means it is articulated with the lower lip and the upper teeth.
- Its phonation is voiced, which means the vocal cords vibrate during the articulation.
- It is a nasal consonant, which means air is exclusively allowed to escape through the nose for nasal stops; otherwise, in addition to through the mouth.
- Because the sound is not produced with airflow over the tongue, the median–lateral dichotomy does not apply.
- Its airstream mechanism is pulmonic, which means it is articulated by pushing air only with the intercostal muscles and abdominal muscles, as in most speech sounds.

== Occurrence ==
Phonemic /ɱ/ is extremely rare. As an allophone of nasal consonants before [f] or [v], however, [ɱ] is very common.

Language		Word	IPA	Meaning	Notes
Arabic	Hejazi	قُرُنْفُل gurunful	[gʊrʊɱfʊl]	'clove'	See Hejazi Arabic phonology
Catalan		limfa	[ˈɫiɱfə]	'lymph'	See Catalan phonology
Czech		tramvaj	[ˈträɱʋäj]	'tram'	See Czech phonology
Danish		symfoni	[syɱfoˈniˀ]	'symphony'	See Danish phonology
Dutch		omvallen	[ˈʔʊ̞ɱˌvɑlə(n)]	'to fall over'	See Dutch phonology
English		symphony	[ˈsɪ̃ɱᵖ̪fənɪ̞ː]	'symphony'	Allophone of /m/ before /f/ and /v/ See English phonology.
Finnish		kamferi	[ˈkɑɱfe̞ri]	'camphor'	See Finnish phonology
German		fünf	[fʏɱf]	'five'	See German phonology
Greek		έμβρυο émvryo	[ˈe̞ɱvrio̞]	'embryo'	Learned or careful pronunciation. See Modern Greek phonology
Hebrew		סימפוניה simfonya	[siɱˈfonja]	'symphony'	See Modern Hebrew phonology
Hungarian		államfő	[ˈaːlːɒɱᵖ̪føː]	'head of state'	See Hungarian phonology
Italian		invece	[iɱˈveːt͡ʃe̞]	'instead'	See Italian phonology
Kukuya		[ɱíì]		'eyes'	Phonemic, distinguishes /m/ and /ɱ/.
Macedonian		трамвај tramvaj	[traɱˈvaj]	'tram'	See Macedonian phonology
Norwegian		komfyr	[kɔɱˈfyːɾ]	'stove'	See Norwegian phonology
Polish		symfonia	[sɘ̟ɱˈᵖ̪fɔɲ̟ä]	'symphony'	See Polish phonology
Romanian		învăța	[ɨɱvəˈt͡sä]	'to learn'	See Romanian phonology
Russian		амфора amfora	['aɱfərə]	'amphora'	See Russian phonology
Serbo-Croatian		трамвај / tramvaj	[trǎɱʋäj]	'tram'	Allophone of /m/ and /n/ before /f/ and /ʋ/. See Serbo-Croatian phonology
Slovak		amfiteáter	[aɱfiˈteaːter]	'amphitheater'	See Slovak phonology
Slovene		simfonija	[siɱfoˈníːjà]	'symphony'	Allophone of /m/ and /n/ before /f/ and /ʋ/.
Spanish		desinflar	[d̪e̞.sĩɱˈfläɾ]	'to deflate'	See Spanish phonology
Swedish		framför	[ˈfɾaɱˌfɶːɾ]	'in front of', 'performs'	See Swedish phonology
Turkish		amfibi	[äɱfiˈbi]	'amphibian'	See Turkish phonology
West Frisian		ûnwis	[uːɱ'ʋɪs]	'unsure'	Allophone of /n/ before labiodental sounds.
Yuanmen		[ɱoː⁶]		'wear (a hat)'	Was briefly phonemic before merging with /m/.

== See also ==
- Index of phonetics articles

== Bibliography ==
- Kooij, Jan; Van Oostendorp, Marc (2003), Fonologie: uitnodiging tot de klankleer van het Nederlands, Amsterdam University Press, ISBN 9789053566220
- Ladefoged, Peter; Maddieson, Ian (1996), Sounds of the World's Languages, Blackwells
- Landau, Ernestina; Lončarić, Mijo; Horga, Damir; Škarić, Ivo (1999), "Croatian", Handbook of the International Phonetic Association: A guide to the use of the International Phonetic Alphabet, Cambridge: Cambridge University Press, pp. 66–69, ISBN 0-521-65236-7
- Martínez-Celdrán, Eugenio; Fernández-Planas, Ana Ma.; Carrera-Sabaté, Josefina (2003), "Castilian Spanish", Journal of the International Phonetic Association, 33 (2): 255–259, doi:10.1017/S0025100303001373
- Newton, Brian (1972), The generative Interpretation of Dialect: A Study of Modern Greek Phonology, Cambridge Studies in Linguistics, vol. 8, Cambridge University Press
- Paulian, Christiane (1975), Le Kukuya Langue Teke du Congo: phonologie, classes nominales, Peeters Publishers
- Rogers, Derek; d'Arcangeli, Luciana (2004), "Italian", Journal of the International Phonetic Association, 34 (1): 117–121, doi:10.1017/S0025100304001628
- Šuštaršič, Rastislav; Komar, Smiljana; Petek, Bojan (1999), "Slovene", Handbook of the International Phonetic Association: A guide to the use of the International Phonetic Alphabet, Cambridge: Cambridge University Press, pp. 135–139, doi:10.1017/S0025100300004874, ISBN 0-521-65236-7, S2CID 249404451
- Verhoeven, Jo (2005), "Belgian Standard Dutch", Journal of the International Phonetic Association, 35 (2): 243–247, doi:10.1017/S0025100305002173
- Norquest, Peter K. (2007). A phonological reconstruction of Proto-Hlai (PDF) (PhD thesis). University of Arizona. hdl:10150/194203. Archived (PDF) from the original on 2021-07-14.

Place →	Labial					Coronal										Dorsal					Laryngeal			
Manner ↓	Bilabial		Labiodental		Linguolabial		Dental		Alveolar		Postalveolar		Retroflex		(Alveolo-)palatal		Velar		Uvular		Pharyngeal/epiglottal		Glottal	
Nasal	m̥	m	ɱ̊	ɱ		n̼	n̪̊	n̪	n̥	n	n̠̊	n̠	ɳ̊	ɳ	ɲ̊	ɲ	ŋ̊	ŋ	ɴ̥	ɴ				
Plosive	p	b	p̪	b̪	t̼	d̼	t̪	d̪	t	d			ʈ	ɖ	c	ɟ	k	ɡ	q	ɢ	ʡ		ʔ	
Sibilant affricate							t̪s̪	d̪z̪	ts	dz	t̠ʃ	d̠ʒ	tʂ	dʐ	tɕ	dʑ								
Non-sibilant affricate	pɸ	bβ	p̪f	b̪v			t̪θ	d̪ð	tɹ̝̊	dɹ̝	t̠ɹ̠̊˔	d̠ɹ̠˔			cç	ɟʝ	kx	ɡɣ	qχ	ɢʁ	ʡʜ	ʡʢ	ʔh	
Sibilant fricative							s̪	z̪	s	z	ʃ	ʒ	ʂ	ʐ	ɕ	ʑ								
Non-sibilant fricative	ɸ	β	f	v	θ̼	ð̼	θ	ð	θ̠	ð̠	ɹ̠̊˔	ɹ̠˔	ɻ̊˔	ɻ˔	ç	ʝ	x	ɣ	χ	ʁ	ħ	ʕ	h	ɦ
Approximant		β̞		ʋ				ð̞		ɹ		ɹ̠		ɻ		j		ɰ						˷
Tap/flap		ⱱ̟		ⱱ					ɾ̥	ɾ			ɽ̊	ɽ						ɢ̆		ʡ̆		
Trill	ʙ̥	ʙ							r̥	r		r̠	ɽ̊r̥	ɽr					ʀ̥	ʀ	ʜ	ʢ		
Lateral affricate									tɬ	dɮ			tꞎ	d𝼅	c𝼆	ɟʎ̝	k𝼄	ɡʟ̝						
Lateral fricative							ɬ̪		ɬ	ɮ			ꞎ	𝼅	𝼆	ʎ̝	𝼄	ʟ̝						
Lateral approximant								l̪	l̥	l		l̠	ɭ̊	ɭ	ʎ̥	ʎ	ʟ̥	ʟ		ʟ̠				
Lateral tap/flap									ɺ̥	ɺ			𝼈̊	𝼈		ʎ̆		ʟ̆						

		BL	LD	D	A	PA	RF	P	V	U
Implosive	Voiced	ɓ			ɗ		ᶑ	ʄ	ɠ	ʛ
Implosive	Voiceless	ɓ̥			ɗ̥		ᶑ̊	ʄ̊	ɠ̊	ʛ̥
Ejective	Stop	pʼ			tʼ		ʈʼ	cʼ	kʼ	qʼ
Ejective	Affricate		p̪fʼ	tθʼ	tsʼ	tʃʼ	tʂʼ	tɕʼ	kxʼ	qχʼ
Ejective	Fricative	ɸʼ	fʼ	θʼ	sʼ	ʃʼ	ʂʼ	ɕʼ	xʼ	χʼ
Ejective	Lateral affricate				tɬʼ			c𝼆ʼ	k𝼄ʼ	q𝼄ʼ
Ejective	Lateral fricative				ɬʼ					
Click (top: velar; bottom: uvular)	Tenuis	kʘ qʘ		kǀ qǀ	kǃ qǃ		k𝼊 q𝼊	kǂ qǂ		
Click (top: velar; bottom: uvular)	Voiced	ɡʘ ɢʘ		ɡǀ ɢǀ	ɡǃ ɢǃ		ɡ𝼊 ɢ𝼊	ɡǂ ɢǂ		
Click (top: velar; bottom: uvular)	Nasal	ŋʘ ɴʘ		ŋǀ ɴǀ	ŋǃ ɴǃ		ŋ𝼊 ɴ𝼊	ŋǂ ɴǂ	ʞ	
Click (top: velar; bottom: uvular)	Tenuis lateral				kǁ qǁ					
Click (top: velar; bottom: uvular)	Voiced lateral				ɡǁ ɢǁ					
Click (top: velar; bottom: uvular)	Nasal lateral				ŋǁ ɴǁ					
