= Mbamu =

Island in the Republic of the Congo

Coordinates: 4°15′S 15°25′E

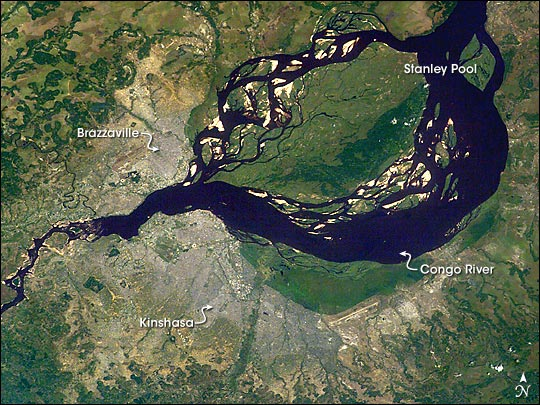
Satellite picture showing the Malebo/Stanley Pool

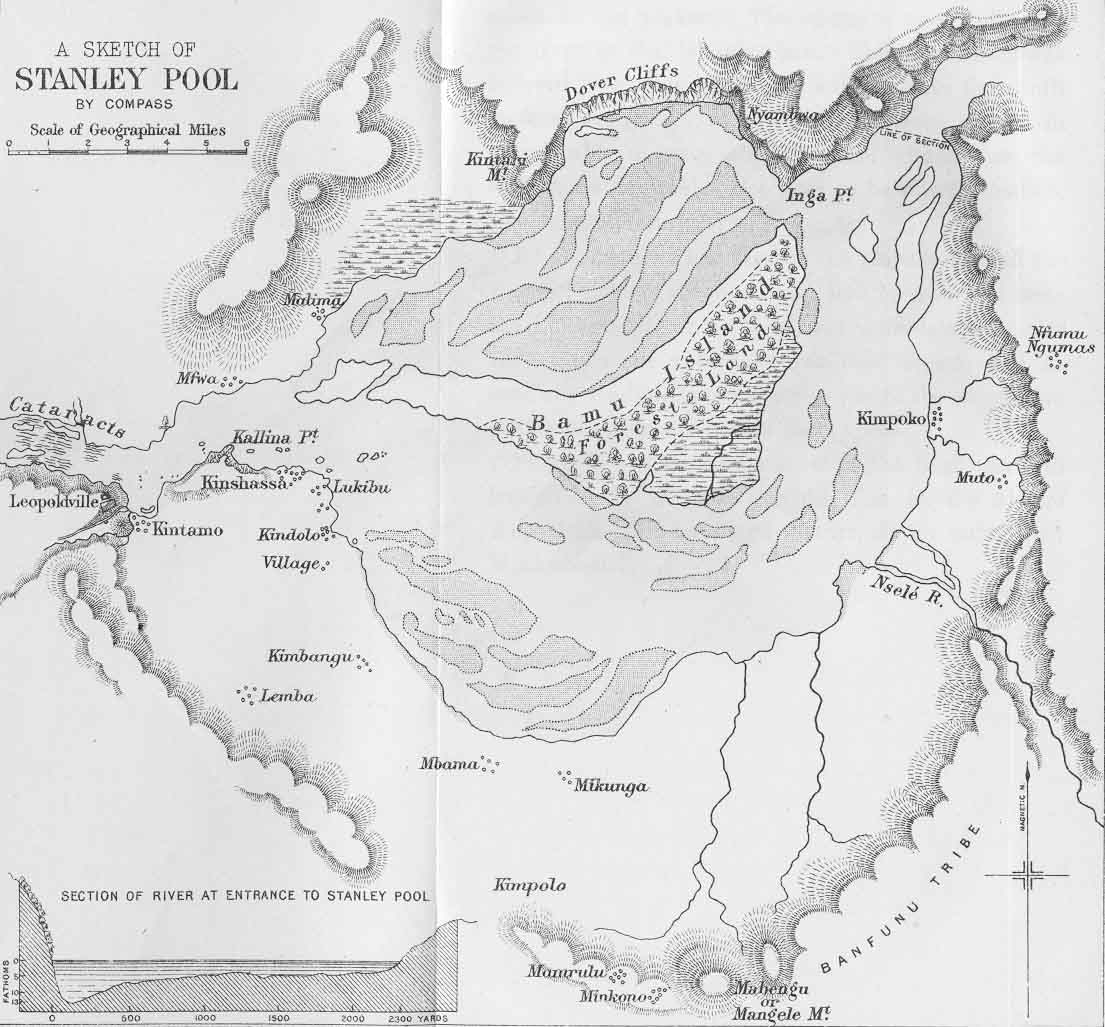
Map of Malebo/Stanley Pool and Mbamu, labelled as "Bamu Island"

Mbamu (also: M´Bamou and Bamu) is an island in the Pool Malebo, a large lake formed by a widening of the River Congo. The island is territory of the Republic of the Congo. Mbamu was a demilitarized zone under the neutral regime established in the Franco-Belgian Convention of 1908, when these two countries exerted colonial rule over the territories on either side of the River Congo.

The Pool Malebo has a surface area of 180 km^{2}. Two national capitals are located downriver: to the northwest along the river is Brazzaville, capital of Republic of the Congo. To the south of the pool and river is Kinshasa, capital of the Democratic Republic of the Congo (Congo-Kinshasa).
