= East Teke language =

Teke dialect spoken in Congo

East Teke
- Bali
- Native to: Democratic Republic of the Congo, Congo
- Native speakers: (200,000 cited 2000)
- Language family: Niger–Congo?: Atlantic–Congo; Benue–Congo; Southern Bantoid; Bantu (Zone B); Teke (B.70); East Teke
- Dialects: Mosieno; Ng'ee; Bali (Tio)

Language codes
- ISO 639-3: tek
- Glottolog: ibal1241
- Guthrie code: B.75–76

East Teke is a member of the Teke dialect continuum of the Congolese plateau. The dialects Mosieno and Ŋee (Esingee) may constitute a separate language from Tio (Teo, Tyo) also known as Bali (Ibali) (Teke proper).
