= Teke languages =

African language family

Teke
- Geographic distribution: Central reaches of the Congo River and adjacent areas
- Ethnicity: Teke people
- Linguistic classification: Niger–Congo?: Atlantic–Congo; Volta-Congo; Benue–Congo; Bantoid; Southern Bantoid; Bantu (Zone B.70); Teke–Mbere?; Teke

Language codes
- ISO 639-3: tek
- Glottolog: kasa1251

The Teke languages are a group of Bantu languages spoken by the Teke people in the western Congo and in Gabon. They are coded Zone B.70 in Guthrie's classification. According to Nurse & Philippson (2003), the Teke languages apart from West Teke form a valid node with Tende (part of B.80):

Tsege
Teghe (Tɛgɛ, North Teke)
Ngungwel (Ngungulu, NE Teke) – Central Teke (Njyunjyu/Ndzindziu, Boo/Boma/Eboo)
Tio (Bali) – East Teke (Mosieno, Ng'ee/Ŋee)
Kukwa (Kukuya, South Teke)
Fuumu (South Teke) – Wuumu (Wumbu)
Tiene (B.80)
Mfinu (B.80)
Mpuono (B.80)

Pacchiarotti et al. (2019) retain West Teke and include additional B.80 languages:

Teke (Kasai–Ngounie)

- Boma Nkuu
- Wuumu-Mpuono
- Mfinu
- Kwa South: East Teke
- Kwa–Kasai North
  - Boma Yumu
  - Sakata
  - Tiinic: Boma Nord, Kempee, Tiene
  - Central Kasai–Ngounie
    - Ngungwel, Central Teke (Teke-Eboo-Nzikou)
    - Interior Kasai–Ngounie
      - Teke-Fuumu
      - Teke-Kukuya
      - Teke-Tyee
      - West Kasai–Ngounie
        - Teke-Tsaayi
        - Mbere: Kaningi, Ndumu, Latege, Mbere-Mbamba, Tchitchege
        - Teke-Laali, Yaka, Njebi, Tsaangi, Duma, Wandji, Vili of Ngounie
