= Mfinu language =

Bantu language of the Democratic Republic of Congo

Mfinu
- Emfinu
- Native to: DR Congo
- Native speakers: 8,400 (2002)
- Language family: Niger–Congo?: Atlantic–Congo; Benue–Congo; Bantoid; Bantu (Zone B); Teke (B.70) (traditionally Tiene–Yanzi, B.80); Mfinu

Language codes
- ISO 639-3: zmf
- Glottolog: mfin1238
- Guthrie code: B.83

Mfinu (also known as Emfinu, Funika, Mfununga, Ntsiam or Ntswar) is a Bantu language of the Democratic Republic of Congo. It is spoken by the Bamfinu tribe.
