= Pool Malebo =

Lake in Central Africa

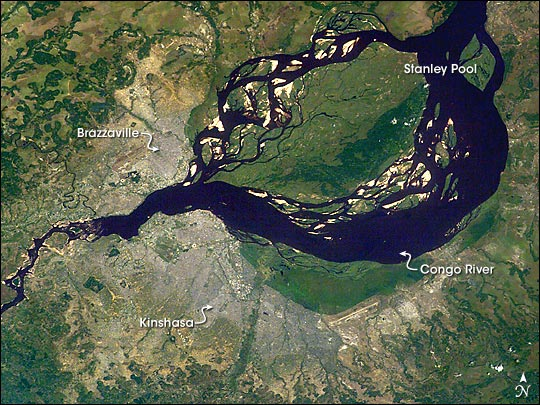
- Satellite image of the Pool Malebo; the capital cities of Brazzaville, ROC and Kinshasa, DRC are indicated.

- Location within Democratic Republic of the Congo Location within Republic of the Congo
- Coordinates: 4°16′55″S 15°29′19″E
- Lake type: Fluvial
- Primary inflows: Congo River
- Primary outflows: Congo River
- Surface elevation: 270 m (890 ft)
- Islands: Mbamu
- Settlements: Brazzaville, Kinshasa

The Pool Malebo (formerly Stanley Pool), also known historically as Mpumbu, Lake Nkunda, Lake Nkuna, Lake Ntamo, or Lake Ngobila, is a broad, lake-like widening of the lower Congo River in Central Africa that forms a natural basin where the river expands before descending downstream into the Livingstone Falls. The pool serves as an international boundary between the Republic of the Congo to the north and the Democratic Republic of the Congo to the south, with the national capitals Brazzaville and Kinshasa situated directly opposite one another on its northern and southern shores.

Spanning roughly 500 square kilometers and measuring about 35 kilometers long by 23 kilometers wide, Pool Malebo is characterized by shallow waters, typically ranging from 3 to 10 meters in depth, though seasonal floods can significantly alter water levels.

The toponym Malebo, the plural of lilebo in Lingala, refers to the Borassus palm that grows abundantly along the pool's shores, islands, and surrounding alluvial plains, while the term pool is borrowed from English, where it denotes a basin and, by extension, a lake. Renamed Stanley Pool in 1887 after the explorer Henry Morton Stanley, who charted the area during his expeditions, the pool officially adopted its current African-derived name in January 1972 following the post-independence policy of Africanization of geographical names. Long before European contact, Pool Malebo served as a key cultural, commercial, and political hub for indigenous Bantu ethnic groups of the central Congo Basin.

== Geography ==
=== Description and toponymy ===
Pool Malebo is an area where the Congo River widens to form a lake. The English term pool denotes a body of water, such as a lake or pond. Kinshasa lies along the southern shoreline of this basin, while Brazzaville is situated on its northern shore. Before colonial naming, local populations knew this stretch of water by various names, including N'Tamo (or Ntamo), Nkouna (Nkuna or Nkunda), Pumbo, Pumbu, Mpumbu, or Ngobila.

==== Ntamo and Nkouna ====
The names N'Tamo (or Ntamo) and Nkouna (Nkuna or Nkunda) are cited in several accounts by European explorers, notably Henry Morton Stanley, as well as in later historical analyses. According to the Congolese historian Jérôme Olland, in L'Histoire du Congo-Brazzaville, Stanley used the term Ntamo to describe Stanley Pool in his book In Darkest Africa. In Congo français du Gabon à Brazzaville, published in 1889, the French explorer Léon Guiral (born Léon Pierre Louis Guiral) notes that Pierre Savorgnan de Brazza, an Italian-born explorer in French service, met the interpreter Ashimbo Taba at Nkouna. However, Father Albert Le Gallois, a Holy Spirit missionary, stated in his Contribution à la cartographie du Congo français (Stanley Pool Region) that although early explorers referred to the large island of Bamu as Nkouna, he never encountered this name among the Téké people of the right bank.

==== Pumbo, Pumbu, or Mpumbu ====
The name Pumbo (Pombo, Pumbu, or Mpumbu) is also mentioned in explorers' accounts and historical literature to designate the Pool region. In Description of Africa, the Dutch scholar Olfert Dapper describes Pombo as a province under the authority of the Macoco (Makoko), ruler of the Téké. Belgian historian Jan Vansina interprets the term as referring to the northern shore of Stanley Pool, which constituted the political center of the Téké kingdom. Abraham Ndinga Mbo, a historian from the Republic of the Congo, uses the name Pumbo to describe the Pool during the precolonial era, while other scholars associate it with the territory of the Bahumbu. The term Pumbo is also commonly understood to mean "large market".

In Portrait of Kinshasa, Professor Pascal Kapagama of the University of Kinshasa notes that in the sixteenth century, a major marketplace known as Mpumbu existed at this location, encompassing several ancient villages, including Insasa. The name Insasa derives from insa, meaning market, or insa-insa, meaning small market, to which the locative prefix ki was added to form Kinshasa. The Congolese researchers Pamphile Mabiala Mantuba-Ngoma and Mathieu Zana Aziza Etambala also attributes the meaning of "market" to the term Mpumbu. In their article La société congolaise face à la modernité (1700-2010): Mélanges eurafricains offerts à Jean-Luc Vellut, he writes: "The zone where the river widened and passed through Mpumbu was the principal slave market of Central Africa. This market, located at the terminus of the navigable stretch of the Congo River, encompassed the former villages of what is now Pool Malebo (formerly Stanley Pool). These villages received all products coming from the upper reaches of the river, from the Kasai Basin and the Mai-Ndombe region. It was here that merchants from the south came to obtain goods for resale to Europeans along the Atlantic coast. This commercial zone was called the Congo River zone".

==== Stanley Pool and Pool Malebo ====
In 1887, it was renamed Stanley Pool in tribute to Stanley, the first European explorer to "discover" it and record its surface area at 400 km^{2}. It was Frank Pocock, a companion of Stanley, who, while in the service of Leopold II of Belgium, proposed the name as they entered this immense basin on 12 March 1877, as Stanley recounts in Through the Dark Continent. Following national independence of Congo-Léopoldville, the name was changed in January 1972 to Pool Malebo. The toponym Malebo, the plural of lilebo in Lingala, refers to the palm trees (Borassus aethiopum Mart., syn. Borassus flabellifer), which are widespread along the pool's banks, islands, and the surrounding alluvial plains of Kinshasa. Thus, the name Pool Malebo is a botanical designation and literally translates to "Lake of Borassus".

=== Terrain and navigation ===
Pool Malebo is roughly 35 kilometres (22 mi) in length and 23 kilometres (14 mi) in width, covering an area of about 500 km^{2} (190 sq mi), and is dotted with islands, the largest of which is M'Bamou Island, which lies at its center and spans approximately (180 km^{2} (69 sq mi) and is part of the Republic of the Congo. The pool is relatively shallow, with depths ranging from 3 to 10 meters, though seasonal flooding can cause water levels to fluctuate by up to 3 meters annually. The average elevation of the area is around 272 metres (892 ft) above sea level.

Along the southern portion of the pool, Brazzaville and Kinshasa face each other on opposite shores, making them the closest pair of national capitals in the world (other than the contiguous Rome and Vatican City). Maluku is located at the upstream entrance to the basin, from which Pool Malebo marks the start of the navigable Congo River toward Mbandaka, Makanza, Bangui, and as far as Kisangani, while downstream of Ngaliema Bay, the river plunges through a succession of rapids known as the Livingstone Falls, descending approximately 300 meters on its way to the port of Matadi.

== History ==
=== Early history ===
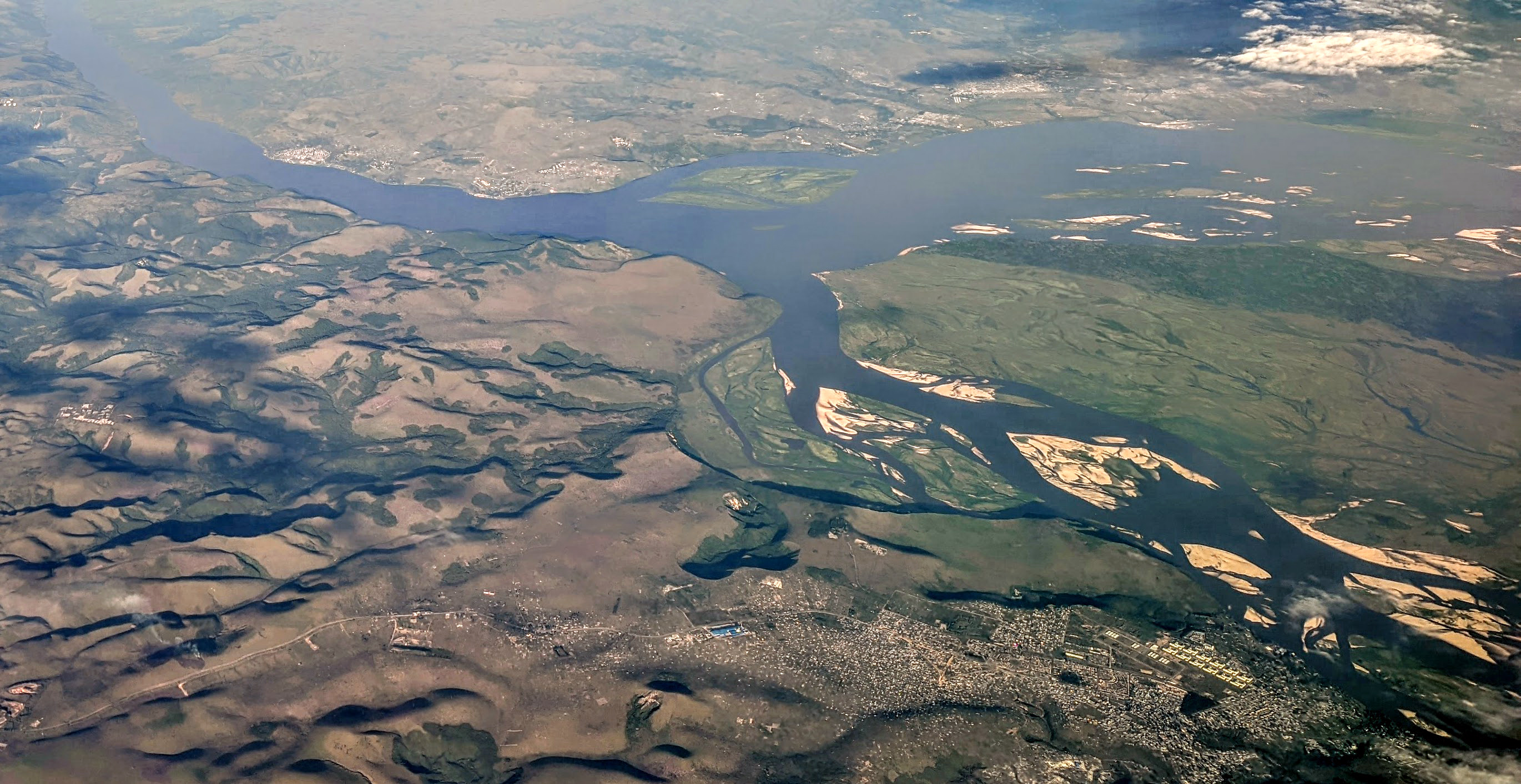
Aerial view from the northwest of the Congo River, showing the upstream half of Pool Malebo and Mbamu Island. The northern outskirts of Brazzaville appear in the right foreground.

European contact with the Congo River region began in 1483, when the Portuguese navigator Diogo Cão reached the river's mouth and established relations between the Kingdom of Portugal and the Kingdom of Kongo. This encounter ended Central Africa's relative isolation from intercontinental networks and marked the beginning of written documentation on the region. Archaeological and linguistic research, particularly on Bantu languages, indicates, however, that human settlement in the Congo Basin long predates European contact, with evidence for agriculture and iron and copper metallurgy extending back "roughly two thousand years". From the sixteenth century onward, the region became integrated into Atlantic commercial systems, particularly through the transatlantic slave trade. A major trade axis developed along the Congo River, which extends from the Atlantic coast to the middle river basin. Pool Malebo functioned as a pivotal transshipment point within this network, dividing it into two distinct zones. The western zone, stretching from the coast to the pool, relied heavily on overland routes and acted primarily as a corridor for the movement of goods, with important centers such as Tungwa, Tshela, São Salvador, Kimongo, and Ludima connected by road networks. The eastern zone, extending from Pool Malebo toward the Ubangi–Uélé confluence, was chiefly a production region, supplying items such as pottery, salt, sugarcane alcohol, ivory, rubber, and copal.

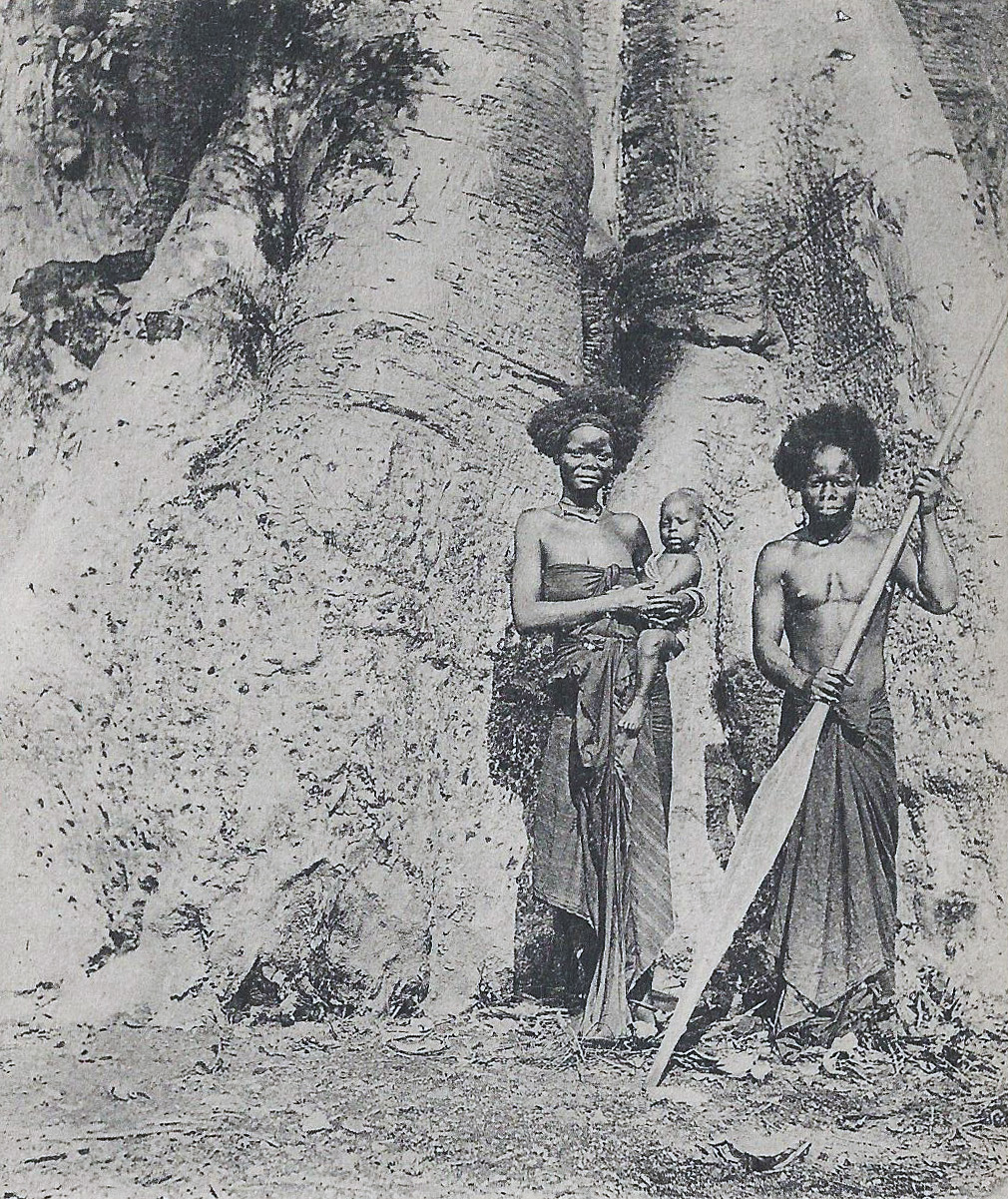
Bateke couple, Congo Free State, 1898.

The area around Pool Malebo belonged to the Tio Kingdom, whose people are more commonly under the ethnonym Batéké. Jan Vansina, who wrote an entire study on this kingdom, explains that Batéké is likely a Kongo term used for groups belonging to the Tio Kingdom or describing their defining traits. Across the Kongo region, the Batéké plateau, and the central Congo valley, the ethnonym Téké is associated with the idea of selling. In Kikongo, téké means "to sell", a reference to the Tio's primary economic pursuit, commerce, and to how neighboring peoples viewed them: essentially as merchants. Vansina notes that the Tio were among the most familiar Central African groups to Europeans and Americans because of their presence around Pool Malebo. Many enslaved people exported to the Americas, as well as ivory from the Congo Basin, passed through markets in this area. The Tio Kingdom itself likely emerged when several small political and territorial communities united under one of them and a prominent leader, the Makoko (king). According to Isidore Ndaywel è Nziem, one of these communities included the ruins of a very ancient kingdom called N'guunu, located at Pool Malebo. This process of unification took place around the sixteenth century. Over time, the Tio built strong commercial connections with neighboring states such as the Kingdom of Kongo and Loango, which enabled the circulation of goods between the Atlantic coast and the interior. Pool Malebo served as the principal storage center and the key junction of this commercial corridor, functioning as its primary hub for goods transfer.

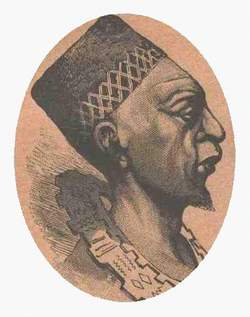
Iloo I (also known as Illoy Loubath Imoumba or Mboulignaoh Illoh), chief of the Bateke of Mbé and king of the Bateke from 1874, held the title Makoko, Onkô, or Ma-Onkô, traditionally given to a patriarchal leader. He died in 1892.

On the southern bank of the pool lived the Mfumu and Humbu (Bahumbu) peoples, who were culturally and linguistically related to the Batéké but constituted distinct groups. Vansina notes that the Bahumbu controlled the southern territories of the Pool. Most of their settlements were situated inland behind the surrounding hills, with their capital located at Lemba. The leader of Lemba, based in Mbanza-Lemba, served as the chief authority for the Pool's southern shore. For several centuries, Europeans were unable to penetrate the Pool Malebo region. Compared with areas of West Africa, the Congo Basin was colonized very late. Natural geographic barriers played a role, but more decisive was the determined effort of Bakongo and Batéké merchants to block Europeans, whether traders or missionaries, from approaching the Pool. This becomes evident in François Bontinck's account, which describes the ordeals faced by Italian missionaries in the seventeenth century as they tried to enter the Makoko Kingdom by passing through the Kingdom of Kongo. Their first attempt failed, with one missionary beaten and even threatened with execution. They reached the Pool only on a second try, and even then their escape route toward the Tio Kingdom ended on the southern bank, they were not allowed to cross the river to meet Makoko. Other missionaries of the same order encountered similar resistance. After several failed attempts, they sought to reach the Makoko Kingdom through the Ngobila canal, territory of the Batéké, but were attacked by warriors loyal to the king. Their village was burned, and the king later rebuilt it elsewhere, away from them. The attackers wanted to keep missionaries out, fearing that baptism and Christian influence would undermine commercial interests. The Tio kept themselves at the margins of the Kongo Kingdom because they worried that missionaries following Portuguese trade routes might discover the economic privileges of Tio territory, such as transit rights and various fees levied on those passing through. The missionaries ultimately returned to Kongo without meeting Makoko. The Makoko Kingdom continued to enchant missionaries stationed in Kongo, who dreamed of establishing missions there, but merchant resistance ensured that these ambitions were never realized.

=== River trade and socioeconomic transformation ===
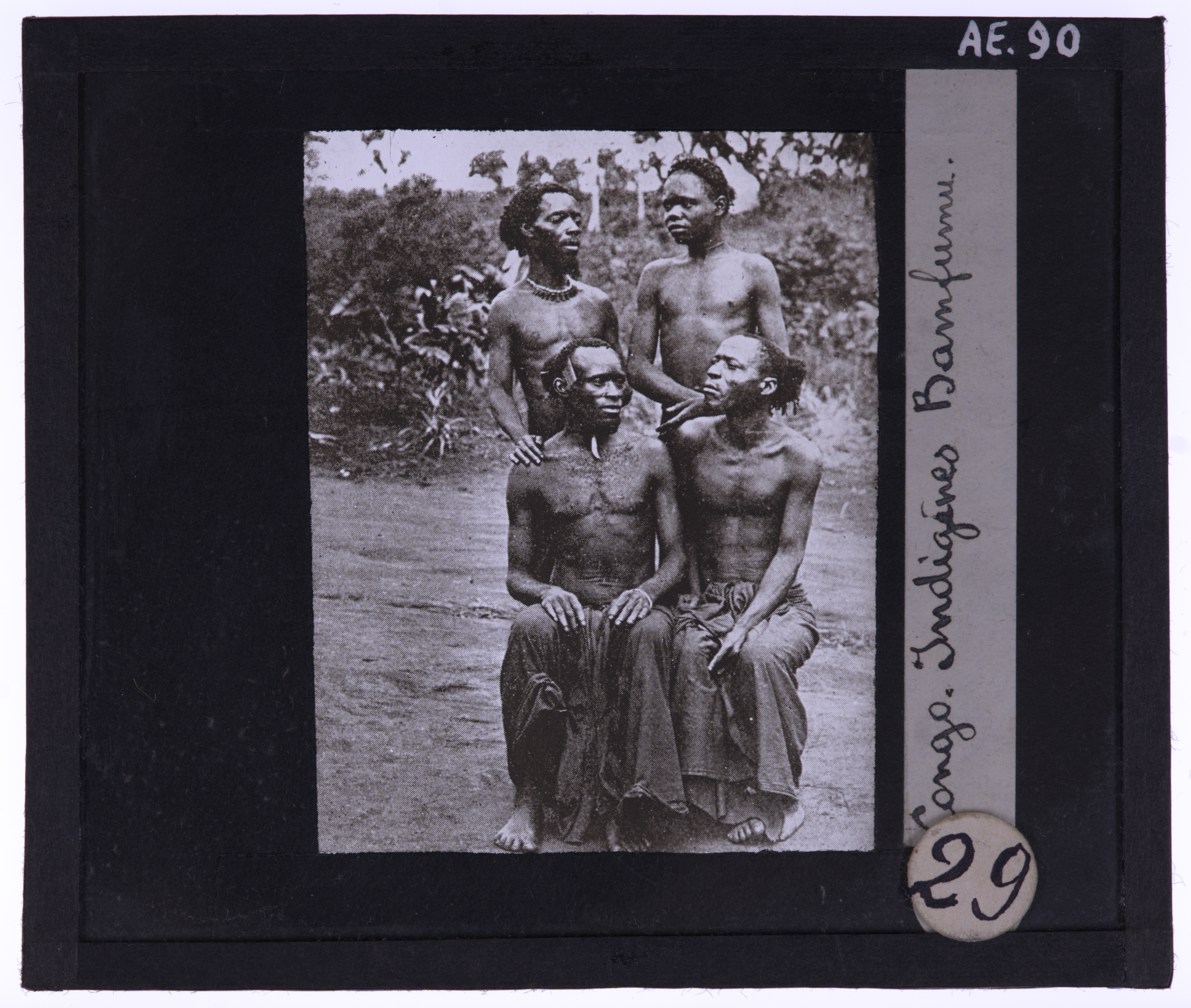
Mfumu men in Léopoldville

During the nineteenth century, long-distance river trade expanded significantly, even though the slave trade had been officially banned, and from Pool Malebo, caravans of porters carried goods to trading stations near the mouth of the Congo River in the Lower Congo. Congolese guides crossing this region led thousands of caravans transporting enslaved people together with chili peppers, palm kernels, peanuts, sesame, ivory, and, later, rubber. For days at a time, communities in the Lower Congo supplied the stations where Europeans baked bread in huge ovens, and households easily obtained large quantities of European goods such as gin, firearms, gunpowder, and cloth. By this period, the Bobangi had joined the Batéké in commercial activity at Pool Malebo. Migrating from the Ubangi River, where they initially lived, they moved into the middle Congo and then toward the Pool between the late eighteenth and early nineteenth centuries. They were not invaders; instead, they were drawn by the commercial vitality of the region. Calling themselves "river people", the Bobangi gave fresh energy to trade. Each Bobangi merchant could unload at least a ton of goods per year at the Pool, amounting to roughly forty tons annually. Their trade revolved largely around ivory and enslaved persons destined for coastal posts, which were exchanged for European-manufactured items like guns and textiles. Slave exports continued until around 1850–1860, when they were replaced by new commodities such as tobacco. In the 1870s, the Bobangi delivered between 5,000 and 6,000 elephant tusks to Pool Malebo. They earned a reputation as expert navigators of the Congo and its tributaries, the Alima, Likouala, and Ikelemba, between Pool Malebo and Bangala territory in the Ubangi valley. Their trade caravans, often made up of 10 to 60 pirogues loaded with goods, frequently traveled along the river. The Lingala language, derived from a river-trade lingua franca used along the Congo and Ubangi, spread as the primary commercial language in heavily trafficked zones, even though it originated with a relatively small group of "river people". Over time, the Bobangi first participated in, and then dominated, trade along the entire Congolese commercial network, a position they held until the establishment of the Léopoldville post and the introduction of steam navigation by Henry Morton Stanley in 1881, events that disrupted, but did not completely end, their trading system.

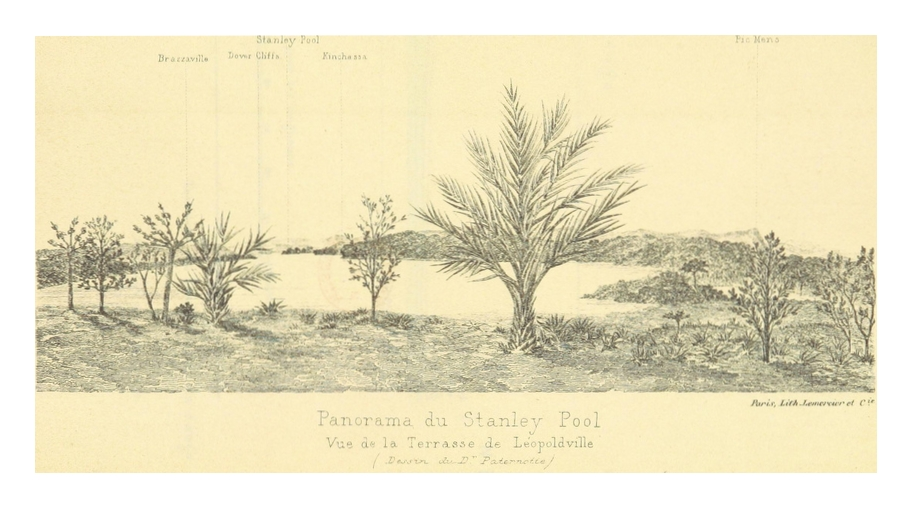
Eastward view across Stanley Pool from the terrace at Léopoldville, ca. 1889.

As the nineteenth century drew to a close, the Congo River trade system fell apart. Its collapse resulted from the division of river zones between French and Belgian authorities, the creation of new trading posts in formerly local riverside villages, the introduction of steam transport, and the construction of railways. The commercial activity described earlier had once linked Africa, Europe, and the Americas, tying the Pool Malebo region into the expanding capitalist world-economy as early as the seventeenth century. Yet this trade was controlled by only a small elite, mainly the inhabitants living along the Pool, who possessed exclusive rights to sell enslaved people and ivory. These chiefs amassed significant wealth in the form of captives, weapons, and imported goods. Chiefs residing farther inland exercised much less economic influence, as they took part only indirectly in regional trade by sending their dependents to the Pool. Alongside river commerce, local subsistence and craft production remained vital. Everyday life relied primarily on local agricultural and artisanal output, which produced the surpluses needed to support traders and artisans. The socioeconomic changes that reshaped the area during the nineteenth century also profoundly affected the subsistence economy, agriculture and craftwork. Agriculture expanded markedly. The processing of cassava for river markets demanded a growing female workforce, while tobacco production, mainly destined for export, required significant male labor, often composed of enslaved workers. In contrast, some traditional crafts, particularly ironworking, declined. Imported metal goods from the Atlantic coast became cheap enough to replace iron tools, bows, and arrows made locally. Even the manufacturing of canoes and paddles, so central to Bobangi transport and fishing, diminished. Pottery, however, grew substantially in importance.

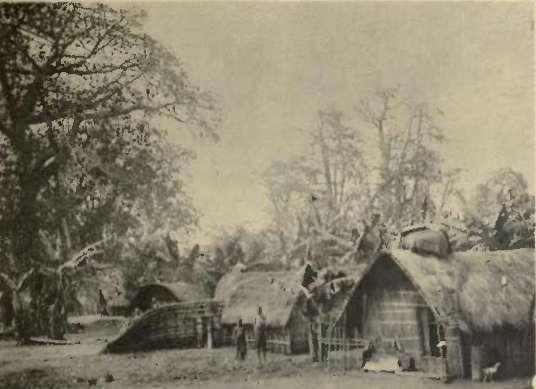
A view of Kinshasa village in 1912, a settlement also referred to historically as Insasa, Ntasa, Nshasa, or Nsasa.

The southern side of Pool Malebo was made up of numerous villages of unequal size and importance: some sat directly on the river's edge, whereas others were situated farther inland. Among the principal riverside villages were Ntassa (Kinshasa) and Ntamo (Kintambo), which functioned as the chief markets of the southern bank. The major settlements in this area included Kinshasa, Kintambo, and Lemba. Villages such as Nolo, Kingabwa, Mokilao, and Kinsuka were also located along the river and were inhabited by Batéké. The inland villages belonged to the Bahumbu. Their chief village was Mbanza-Lemba, an important commercial hub. Other notable Bahumbu villages included Kimbanza and Kimwenza. Economic and social life differed for communities depending on whether they lived along the river or farther inland. According to Jan Vansina, the riverside villages near Pool Malebo could essentially be regarded as commercial towns. Unlike inland villages, these riverside communities were clusters made up of several smaller villages, often six or seven. For instance, Kinshasa consisted of multiple small villages scattered across the Kalina and Ndolo plains. Most riverside villages had mixed populations composed of Tio and Bobangi. Their organization was distinctive: a small number of free men presided over and managed a large enslaved population. Many of these riverside centers held hundreds of enslaved people. The biggest villages, such as Kinshasa and Kintambo, may have had roughly 500 to 1,000 residents, including women. These major villages frequently hosted caravans of traders from across the Congo River trade network, whose camps remained for weeks at a time. Riverside villagers cultivated little land and instead bought food from the inland Bahumbu villages. A few men fished, but the majority relied on local commerce. Women in these villages also saw major changes in their economic roles with the rise of riverine trade. Because little farmland surrounded these settlements, women devoted themselves largely to crafts, especially pottery, and to producing large quantities of cassava bread (chikwangue) for the trader caravans lodged in the villages. They also participated in the markets, selling food purchased from women in the inland villages. Despite this work, their daily routines gave them more leisure time than those of women who lived inland.

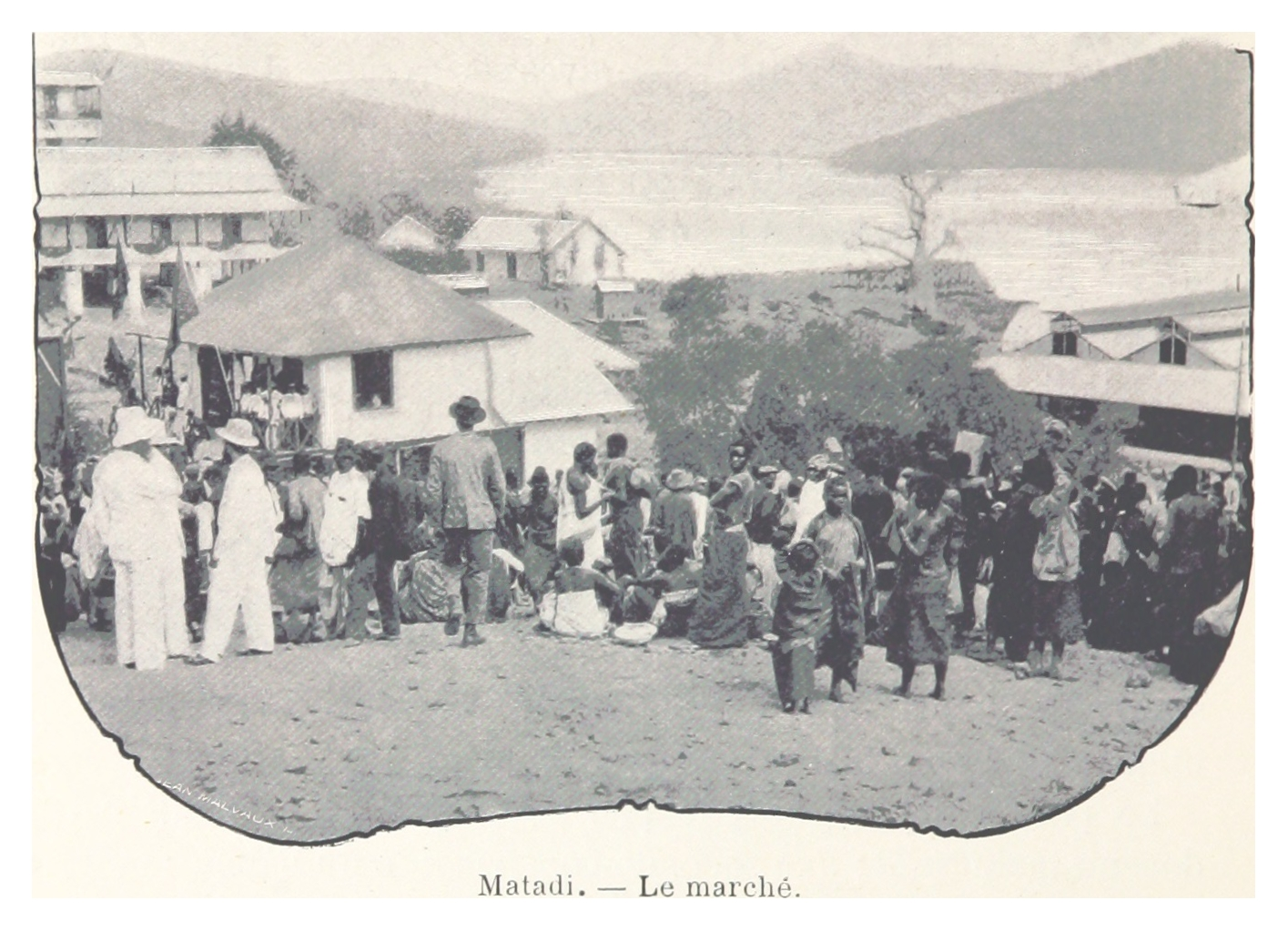
A marketplace in Matadi, circa 1899.

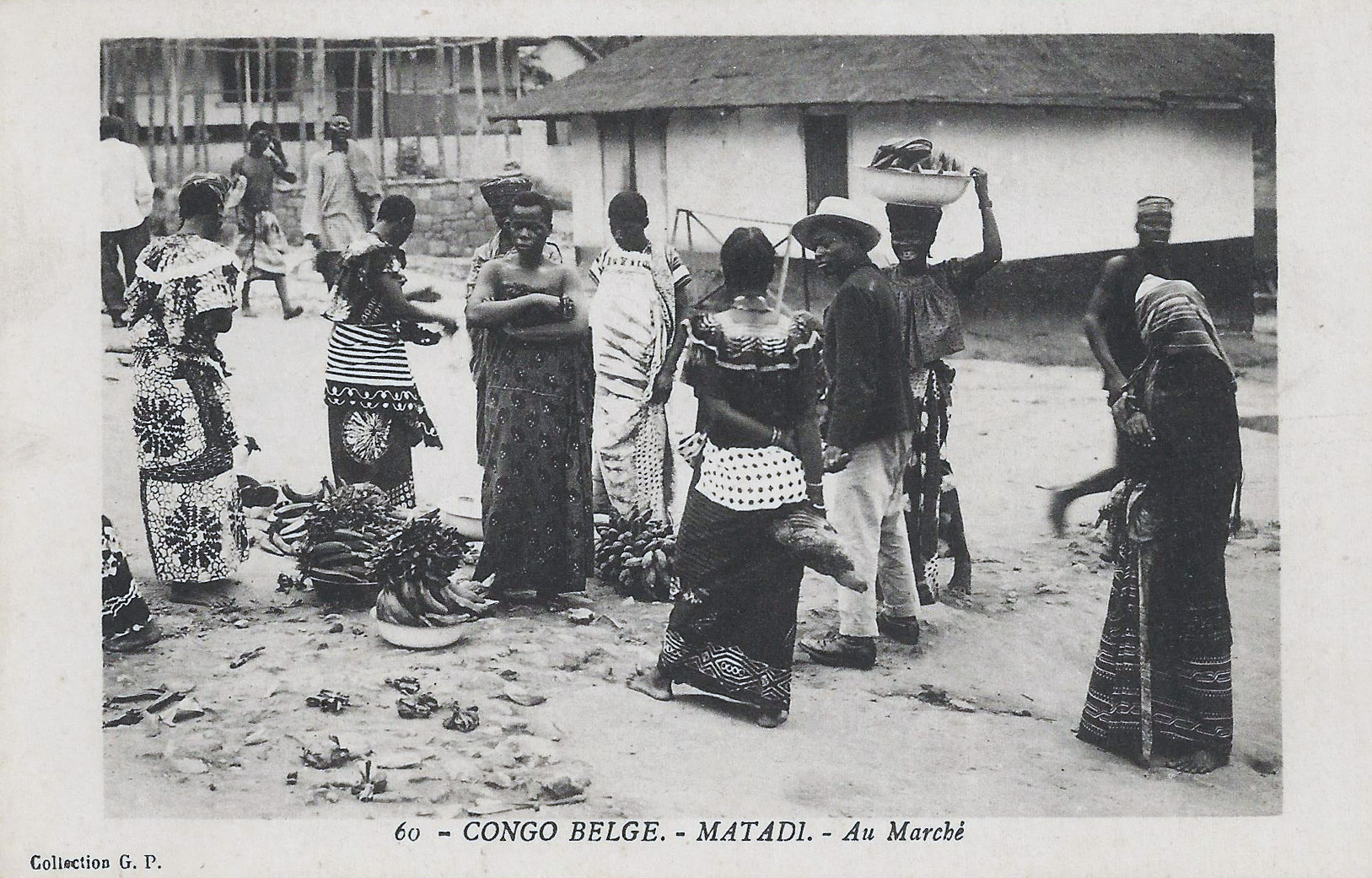
Marketplace scene in Matadi, circa 1905.

Among the Bahumbu, agriculture remained the primary means of livelihood. Their villages hosted markets of varying regional importance, depending on their involvement in long-distance river trade or in more localized exchange networks. For instance, Lemba, located in the Pumbu region, functioned as a major commercial hub, far surpassing Kimwenza, whose market served mainly local needs. Lemba drew numerous participants in river commerce, including the Bobangi, who could travel upriver from Ngili to Kimbangu and from there easily continue to Lemba. Bahumbu villages were usually small, rarely exceeding about three hundred inhabitants, women and children included. However, they were numerous and situated only a few kilometers apart. The Bahumbu were accomplished agriculturalists: they farmed, fished, hunted, and practiced multiple crafts. Their production supported household consumption and trade. They grew bananas, sugarcane, pineapples, cassava, maize, sweet potatoes, and beans; they also fished in the Congo River and its tributaries and sold game, livestock, peanuts, kaolin, tobacco, and other goods. As a result, they were the principal suppliers of foodstuffs to the riverside villages. When caravans of traders arrived and stayed for weeks at a time, sometimes up to four, the Bahumbu used the opportunity to raise their prices. The caravans represented a vital source of revenue for the inland economy. Trade also flowed both ways: caravans purchased goods from riverside villages, but villagers also bought items from the caravans. Among the products destined for the broader international market and acquired by Bobangi merchants were goods meant for local use, such as beverages, alcohol, metal tools, luxury household items, artisanal goods, and textiles. Through this extensive river trade, even smaller villages around the Pool became accustomed to the regular presence of goods originating from various regions of the Congo. As river commerce expanded, ordinary people also grew accustomed to consuming European imports arriving from the Atlantic coast. These imported items were usually cheaper and of higher quality than locally made equivalents. Their superior quality meant they were initially treated as luxury goods, but they gradually became everyday necessities. This shift led to a strong dependence on foreign merchandise and diminished Batéké self-reliance. The European goods integrated into daily life were extremely varied, including fabrics, blankets, glassware, gunpowder, salt, cutlery, jewelry, bottles, candles, tableware, and more. European alcoholic beverages, such as gin and rum, also became widely consumed. Despite the competition from imports, local crafts, especially pottery, continued to flourish. These handmade goods were sold to the Bobangi, who then transported them farther upriver. According to Vansina, this persistence of local production may be linked to cultural preferences: utensils crafted by the inhabitants of the Pool were highly esteemed, particularly jars, basins, cooking pots, and brass items. Smoked and salted fish were also in high demand at the Pool, serving as commodities and as a means of payment. Smoked fish was carried by the Bobangi, who used it in local markets to procure food, while salted fish, made using sea salt from the Atlantic coast, circulated in exchanges between large riverside communities and inland villages.

Corn beer, sugarcane wine, and inland trade products were abundant in the Pool's markets and enjoyed strong popularity. Women typically sold animal products, beer, and wine, while men traded tobacco and dried meat. A sort of regional specialization emerged along the southern bank: large villages focused on commercial activity, while the inland Batéké plateau villages, devoted to farming and livestock raising, supplied them with essential foodstuffs. Seasonal changes in river trade created alternating periods of plenty and scarcity. Merchant caravans arriving from the northern Congo trade corridor reached the Pool by water and routinely stayed in major settlements throughout both dry and rainy seasons. In contrast, caravans traveling inland from the Atlantic coast were more consistent during the dry season. These fluctuations shaped local economic rhythms. As nineteenth-century exchange intensified around the Pool, agriculture expanded significantly in the southern inland regions and on the Batéké plateaus. Cassava production and processing rose rapidly, driven by growing demand and the longer stays of trading caravans in the area.

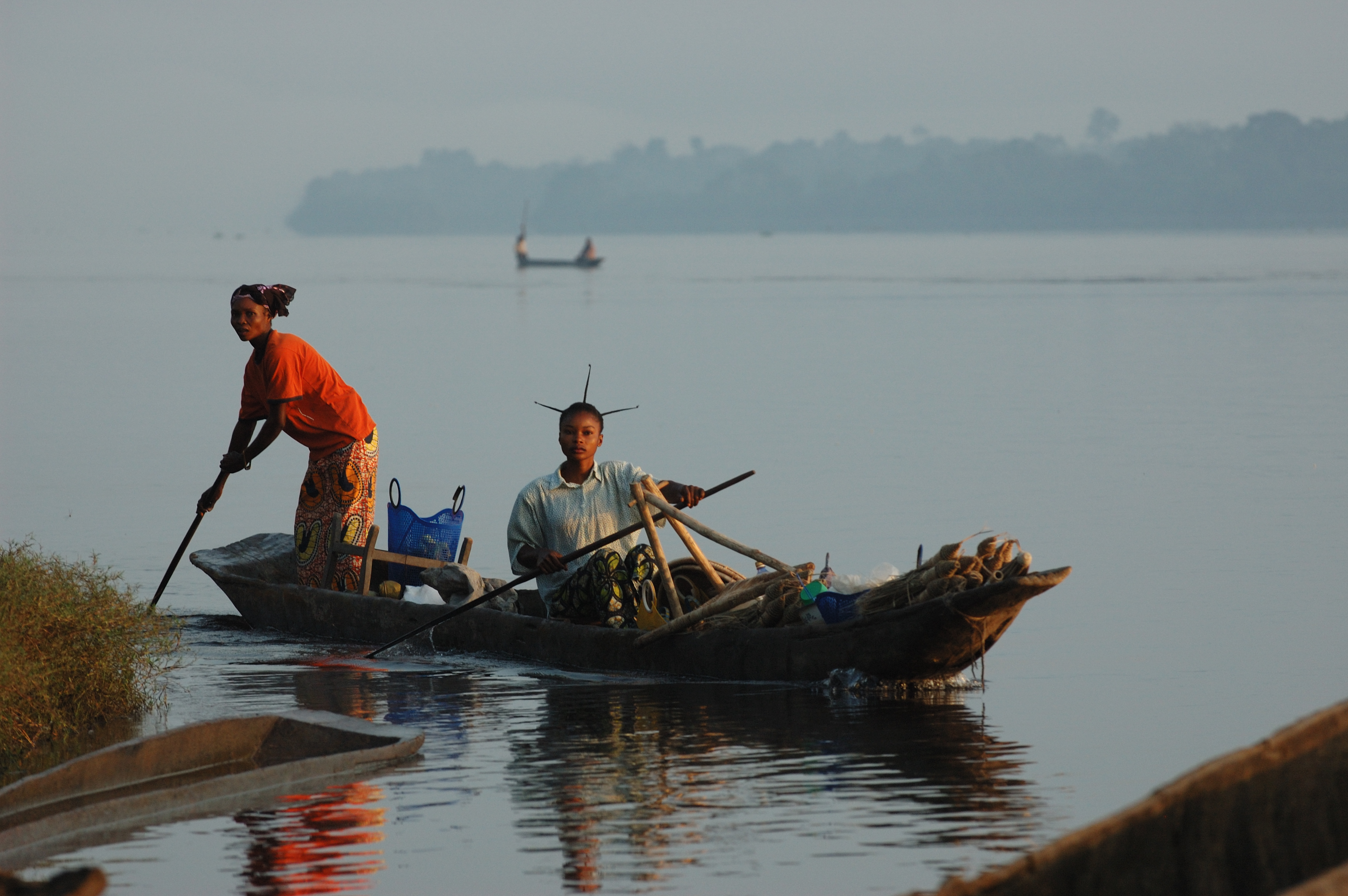
Isangi people living on the Congo River

Traditional markets formed the core of local economic life. There were local and interregional markets, each distinguished by the types of goods exchanged, how often they were held, and the origins of the traders. A traditional week included one dedicated market day, separate from days of rest and agricultural work. Because market days varied between regions, people could easily travel from one market to the next. Yet the market was not purely an economic institution; it also fulfilled essential social and cultural functions. It served as a venue for entertainment, where new fashions appeared, and dancers presented new styles that then circulated more widely. Markets also acted as public forums: official announcements were made there, new laws were proclaimed, disputes were settled, and major crimes were judged. Barter was the earliest form of exchange and did not entirely disappear even after new instruments of trade appeared. Initially, some goods served simultaneously as commodities and as means of exchange. Later, symbolic objects were used as monetary markers, followed by rudimentary currencies such as shells, cloth, necklaces, metal rods, and motako (plural mitako). With the arrival of colonial capitalism in the Congo Basin, motako eventually became the dominant form of money. This economic system corresponded to the local economy, the economy of those excluded from large-scale river trade, which was controlled by a small elite of chiefs and influential figures. In practice, however, the economic activities of the "lower" and "upper" classes were interdependent. Large-scale river commerce generated a steady and predictable market for local producers, while the local economy supported river traders by supplying the food they needed during their stays at the Pool.

African societies engaged in European trade underwent significant social change, especially within their higher social strata. Traditional political, religious, and ritual leaders gradually lost influence to new elites who accumulated wealth through commerce. At Pool Malebo, although new figures emerged, particularly chiefs of riverside villages who were deeply involved in river trading, the older authorities continued to exercise considerable influence. These newly enriched chiefs acquired the military, material, and symbolic assets needed to consolidate their power. Another outcome of this process was the widening gap between the rich and the poor. Those who benefited directly from the major river trade formed a wealthy group, while those unable to participate became the poor. Despite this divide, both groups remained closely linked, with poorer individuals relying on and serving their wealthier counterparts. Immanuel Wallerstein notes that Europe experienced similar patterns of social differentiation between the fifteenth and seventeenth centuries as long-distance commerce expanded. He observes that the main divide existed between those whose primary interest lay in the profits of the world market and those who did not share this orientation. The latter defended privileges tied to their social status, ranging from aristocratic rights to peasant protections inherited from feudalism or the monopolies of outdated guilds. Under the appearance of cultural unity, unusual alliances emerged that sometimes exerted enough pressure to influence central political institutions. At other times, these groups remained passive, serving, sometimes effectively, sometimes not, the interests of the dominant powers within the world-system.

=== European penetration, the founding of Léopoldville, and Kinshasa's emergence as the capital ===
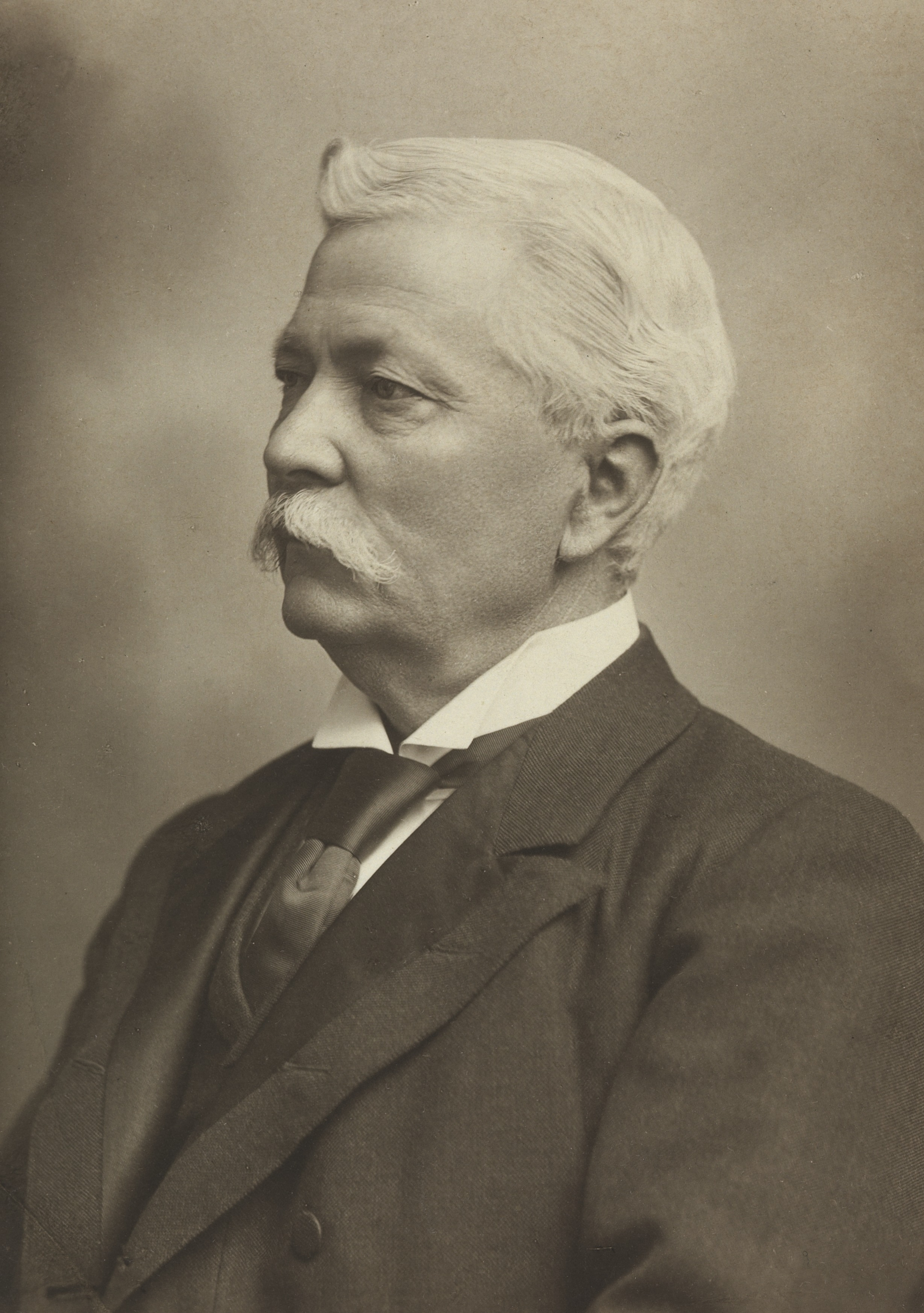
Substantial social disruption did not occur until the colonial system took shape, a development made feasible after Henry Morton Stanley's expeditions opened the Congo River basin to European penetration.

Although trade in the Pool Malebo region was highly active during the nineteenth century, the commercial system had not yet evolved into a capitalist economy. While profits could be considerable, they were shared among multiple participants, especially interior merchants. For instance, ivory profits were divided among the merchant, the hunter who killed the elephant, and the village chief, who automatically received a portion. Riverside inhabitants of the Pool made significant earnings, particularly from ivory, but these profits could not be reinvested in productive ventures. Land could not be purchased, and labor could only be obtained through slavery. Accumulated wealth circulated in the form of loans without interest, and certain goods and social or ritual services, such as fines and bridewealth, remained outside monetary control. Some scholars argue that this period marked a gradual transition from commercial mercantilism to industrial capitalism, allowing Europe to impose new forms of influence over Africa's pre-capitalist economies. Despite changes in production, trade, and monetary practices, social structures remained largely intact. Thus, there were no major social upheavals at this stage, as these transformations mainly reflected deeper European economic penetration, while indigenous social hierarchies stayed stable throughout the nineteenth century. Significant social disruptions would only occur later with the establishment of the colonial system, which became feasible after the Congo River basin was opened to Europe by the Welsh-American explorer Henry Morton Stanley. Stanley completed the mapping of the basin during expeditions that took him from Zanzibar, with the assistance of Tippu Tip, a prominent slave-trading chief, through several forests, eventually reaching the Congo River and arriving in Boma in August 1877. On his journey, he encountered the lake of the Congo River, Pool Malebo, which his companion Pocock named Stanley Pool. After exploring the basin, Stanley aimed to open it to global commerce. When England showed little interest, he accepted an offer from the Comité d'études du Haut-Congo (CEHC), backed by King Leopold II of Belgium, who had long sought colonies. Stanley's mission was to control the Congo River's estuary and establish steamboat routes from the Pool, effectively opening the basin to European trade and laying the groundwork for colonial capitalism and wage labor in the Congo.

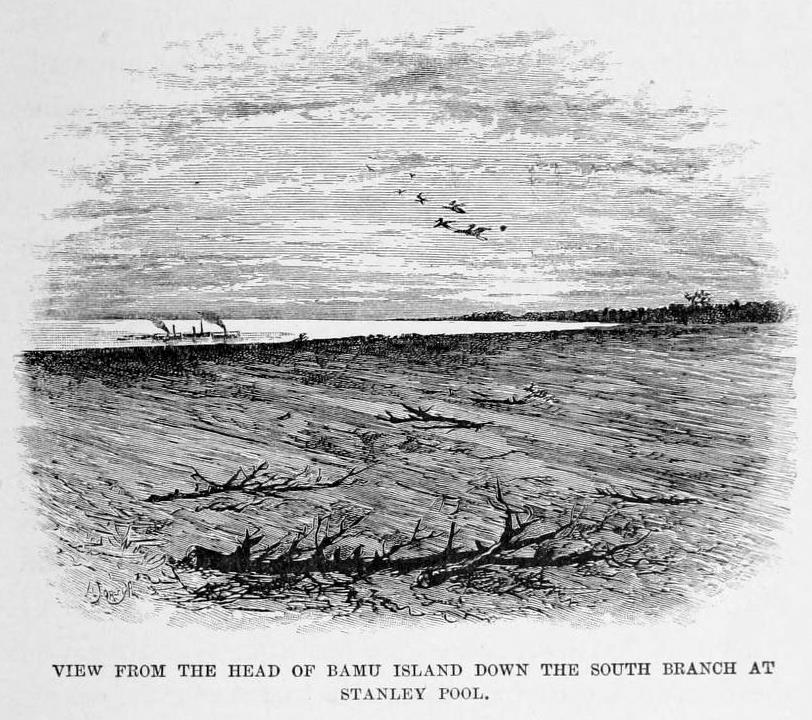
A view from the head of Bamu Island overlooking the southern branch of Stanley Pool

The Léopoldville post was established on 1 December 1881 by Stanley on a hill known to local inhabitants as Konzo Ikulu, which he renamed Mont Léopold. Later, the hill was ceded to him by Ngalimena, the chief of the nearby Kintambo village, giving it the current name Mont Ngaliema. Stanley's caravan route from the Congo River estuary near present-day Matadi ended at Pool Malebo, close to this hill. Léopoldville developed earlier than Kinshasa, and river trade continued after its founding, with ivory merchants bringing goods from the upper river to Kintambo to exchange for imported items. During the first decade, Batéké intermediaries controlled the trade, reselling ivory to European settlers. From its earliest years, Léopoldville expanded: houses were built, roads laid out, trees planted, and Catholic and Protestant missions established. A port was constructed on Kintambo Bay. The Batéké villages in the area remained alongside the post. Between 1890 and 1911, the town's growth accelerated, notably due to the railway's construction. Administrative and logistical infrastructure developed extensively, including naval and transport services, the Force Publique, postal and telegraph offices, customs, the district commissioner's office, hospitals for Europeans and Africans, schools (including mission schools), and a military camp. African workers initially concentrated in one village were later organized into two camps, Kiliamani and Mampeza, numbering around 3,000 by 1907. In contrast, the Kinshasa post between 1883 and 1910 was still in its infancy and expanded slowly. It was linked to Léopoldville by a poorly maintained dirt road. A Dutch trading post (Nieuwe Afrikaanse Handels-Vennootschap) was established there around 1886, along with Portuguese trading posts, European residences, an African workers' camp, a Protestant mission, a coffee factory, and buildings for customs, the post office, and the train station. A railway, following the river at a distance of approximately 500 meters, connected Kinshasa to Léopoldville.

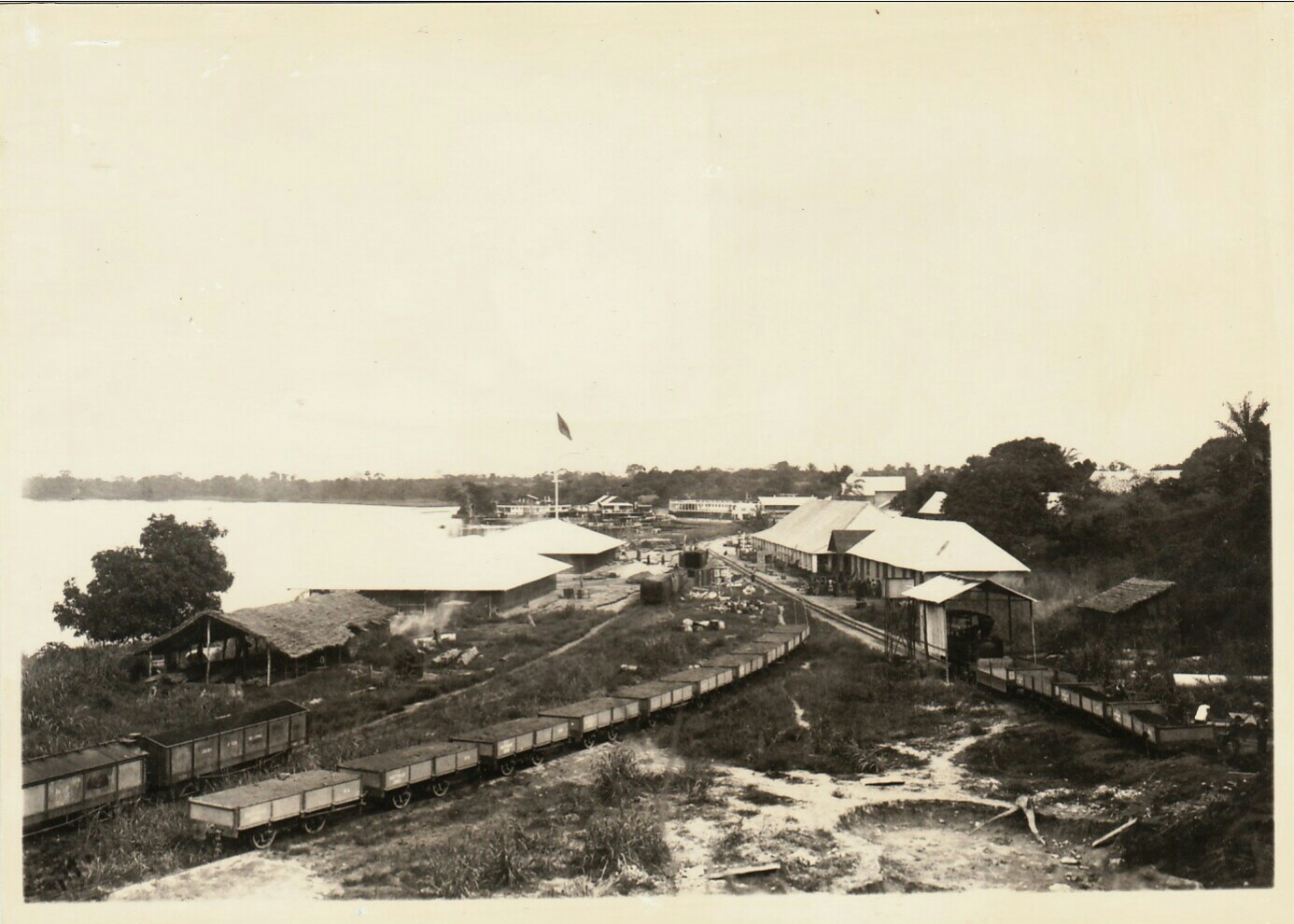
Congo Railways at Léopoldville, a view of the port and the train station

Kinshasa's significant growth began with the construction of a new river port between 1910 and 1912, replacing the Léopoldville port, which was too close to the rapids. The city quickly expanded, attracting commercial firms from Belgium, England, Italy, and Portugal, which established themselves throughout the area. A chamber of commerce was founded in 1912. An African quartier was also built, housing approximately 13,000 people by 1914–1915. A Catholic mission run by the Scheut Fathers (Congregation of the Immaculate Heart of Mary) established primary and vocational schools, and Saint Anne Cathedral was completed in 1915. A market was set up at the present site of the main market, while the old Kinshasa–Léopoldville railway, now Boulevard du 30 Juin, marked the boundary between the European and African sections of the city. As Kinshasa expanded, this boundary moved further south, the railway was relocated, and the market was also shifted. In 1920, Kinshasa and Léopoldville were merged into a single urban district named Léopoldville, which officially became the capital of the Belgian Congo in 1923. Kinshasa developed as the business hub, and this arrangement was formalized in 1929 after the Kalina plain was developed. Administrative buildings, including the governor's palace, were constructed, and a major road connected Léopoldville to Kinshasa. The city expanded, incorporating villages along the southern riverbank, and attracted settlers from across the country, mostly foreigners. Over time, quartiers multiplied, forming the sprawling, cosmopolitan city of Kinshasa. After independence, the name Léopoldville was phased out, and Kinshasa officially became the city's name on 1 July 1966.

=== Economy and Léopoldville's growth ===
==== The port and river trade ====
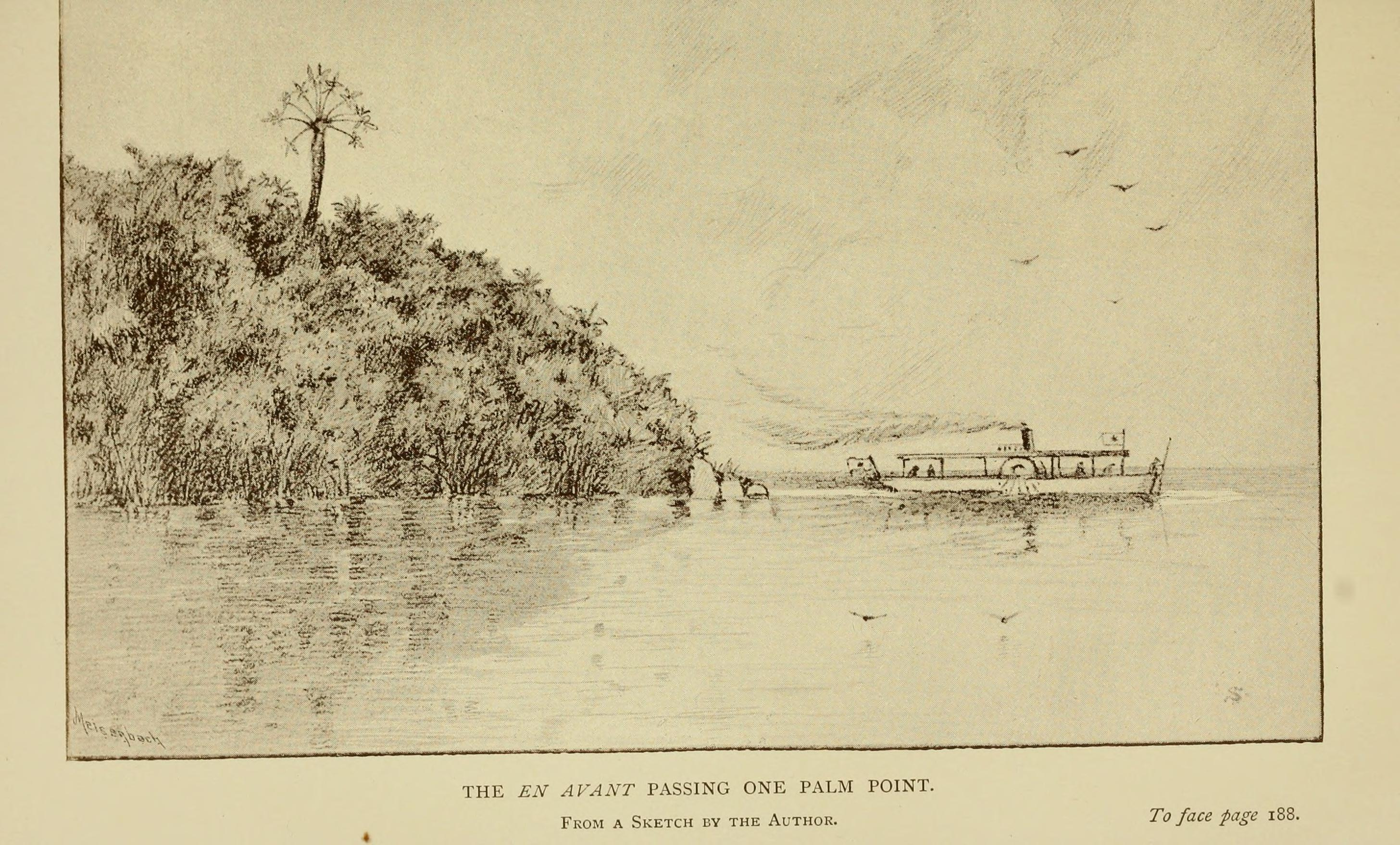
En Avant on the Congo River 1889

Léopoldville's emergence as a colonial center was closely tied to the development of river transport on the Congo River. In 1881, shortly after the Léopoldville post was founded, Stanley launched his first steamboat on the river. This small motorized vessel, called L'En Avant, was moored in a modest cove at the foot of Mount Léopold, which effectively became Léopoldville's first port. This marked the beginning of an inland river fleet, with Stanley Pool serving as its operational base. Stanley Pool's position made it essential to colonial transport and trade networks. A shipyard was initially built to maintain the vessels, but it quickly expanded as commercial demands increased. The goal shifted from simple maintenance to developing a large-scale river transport system capable of supporting intensive extraction and export. By 1887, just six years after the post was established, the officially navigable river network covered roughly 12,000 kilometers. By 1894, 43 steamers were operating across the basin. As trade intensified, the port of Léopoldville grew accordingly; by 1907, it handled 16,205 tons of traffic and employed 1,462 workers, including 112 Europeans.

Meanwhile, European trading companies that had initially operated along the Atlantic coast steadily pushed inland to exploit the resources of the entire Congo Basin. Colonial outposts founded by Stanley and his successors were strategically positioned along riverbanks and served as collection points for rubber, copal, ivory, and other goods.

The introduction of a European-style monetary system profoundly transformed economic relations in the region. A copper rod known as the motako (plural: mitako) was introduced as a standardized medium of exchange throughout the Congo. This currency functioned simultaneously as a unit of account and a medium through which foodstuffs, gathered products, European manufactured goods, and labor services were exchanged. European traders distributed mitako in return for local products, which facilitated access to imported goods such as textiles, second-hand clothing, gunpowder, and firearms. However, this system allowed Europeans to reap substantial profits by exploiting the gap between copper's intrinsic value and the artificially imposed exchange rate of the rod. After 1904, the copper content of the motako was deliberately reduced. As a result, this currency became a discreet but powerful instrument of economic domination, reversing earlier disadvantages Europeans had faced in trade with Congolese populations, particularly in rubber and textile exchanges. Later, promissory notes payable at state stations, known as mocandes, were introduced.

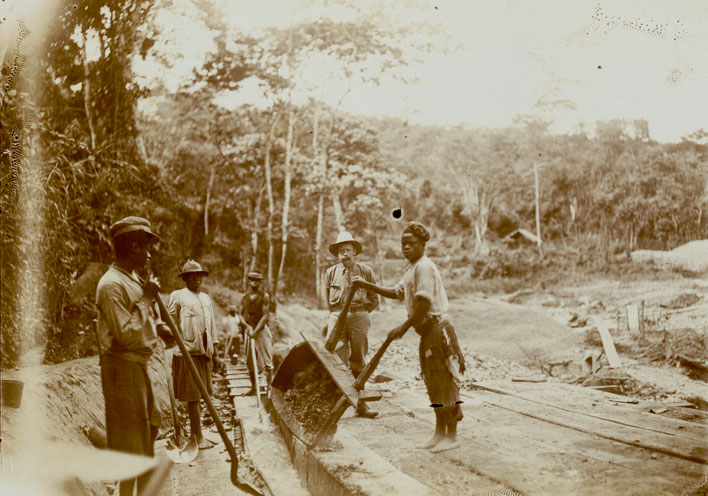
Congolese laborers constructing the Matadi–Léopoldville Railway, January 1887.

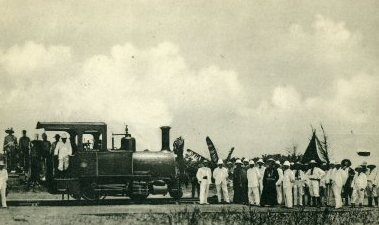
The first locomotive arriving at Léopoldville in 1898

The profitability of trade in the Congo Basin, however, remained limited as long as transport between the coast and the interior relied on porterage along caravan routes. The construction of a railway linking Matadi to Stanley Pool, therefore, became a strategic necessity. Work on the railway began in 1890 and was completed in 1898. On 16 March of that year, the first locomotive arriving from Matadi reached Stanley Pool. The railway project marked the first large-scale attempt to create a proletarian labor force in the region. A group of capitalists formed the Compagnie du Congo pour le Commerce et l'Industrie (CCCI), which controlled the Compagnie du chemin de fer du Congo (CCFC). The CCCI obtained a concession granting it the operation of the Lower Congo route and ownership of 1,500 hectares of land along the future railway line. However, contrary to expectations, the company struggled to recruit local labor and was forced to bring in workers from West Africa. Industrial development remained limited until the railway was completed. An initial industrial zone emerged at Ndolo, east of Léopoldville, near the former Batéké village of Ndolo that included brickworks, sawmills, and various workshops. After 1898, the completion of the railway, together with access to electricity and running water, attracted many businesses to the southern shore of Stanley Pool and encouraged economic diversification.

==== Colonization and power relations ====
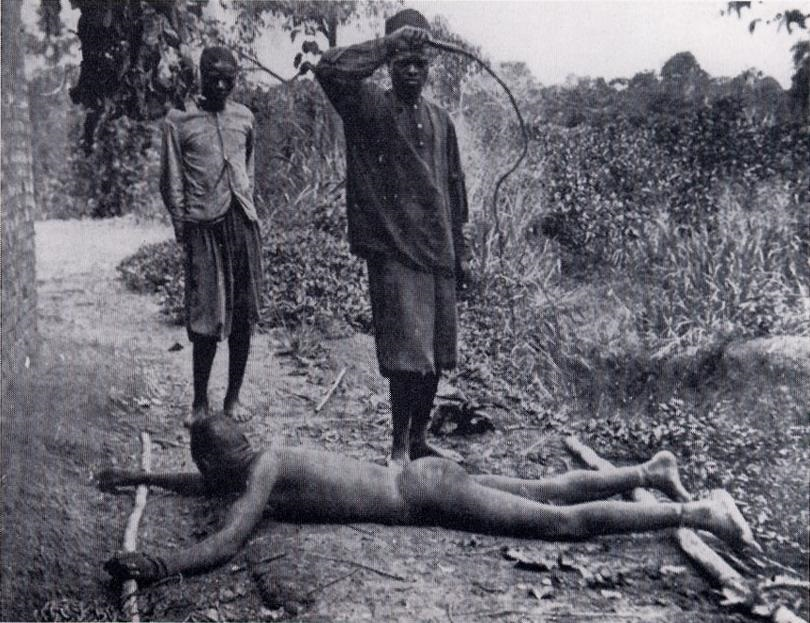
Posed photo of a man being flogged with a chicotte by a Congo State soldier ca.1905

Colonial domination was gradually set in motion through transcontinental trade and missionary activities beginning in the fifteenth century. From the 1870s onward, Stanley employed tactics that set him apart from earlier European actors, relying extensively on armed raids and military campaigns to compel Congolese leaders to submit or relinquish power. These practices were subsequently institutionalized by colonial officials during the conquest phase and the period of administrative consolidation. Colonial rule was enforced through harsh coercive practices, including flogging with the chicotte, forced labor and corvées, the subordination of traditional chiefs, population displacement, and the public humiliation of those who resisted. Power was highly centralized, with major decisions taken in Brussels. Through such means, colonization imposed a capitalist vision of "civilization", defined by the seizure of new markets and the reorganization of Congolese society to support capital accumulation in Léopoldville and throughout the Congo.

The Congo Basin, whose economic potential had been revealed by explorers, also became a site for rivalry among capitalist powers. The Congo's political status was constantly contested as imperialist power relations evolved. Belgian control remained precarious, as other powers sought strategic advantages: Britain showed interest in Katanga, Germany in the eastern regions, and the United States in key resources such as uranium, copper, cobalt, and industrial diamonds. The high costs of early colonial installations and the structural difficulties associated with introducing capitalism into Congolese society transformed the country into a stronghold of international financial groups, whose interests were closely tied to railway infrastructure.

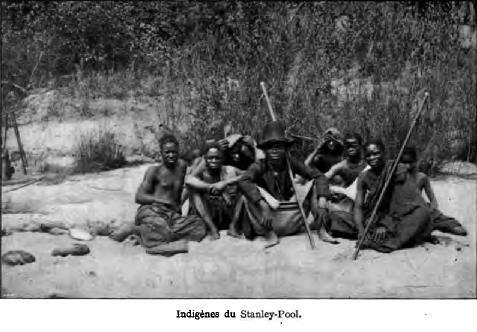
Batéké people photographed at Stanley Pool on the Congo River, c. 1900.

Between 1881 and 1891, after the founding of the Léopoldville and Kinshasa posts, relations between Batéké chiefs and officials of the Congo Free State steadily worsened. A series of conflicts culminated in 1891 in the mass exodus of the inhabitants of Kinshasa, Kintambo, and Ndolo, along with their chiefs: Ntsuvila, Ngaliema, and Bankwa. Although a specific incident served as the immediate catalyst, it functioned mainly as a pretext for colonial authorities to remove the riverine Batéké chiefs and their subjects, who were increasingly viewed as impediments to colonial objectives. Administrators accused the Batéké of insufficient agricultural production, noting their limited cassava cultivation and reliance on supplies from inland and hill villages. Instead, they prioritized river trade, particularly ivory trading, which periodically contributed to food shortages at the Léopoldville post. Colonial officials labeled them idle and unproductive. Their continued involvement in the ivory trade also made them persistent commercial rivals. Batéké chiefs also strongly resisted the corvée labor system colonial authorities sought to impose, including work at trading posts and on road construction. As a result, early trading posts in Kinshasa were forced to recruit labor from the interior of the country. Taken together, these factors led colonial officials to regard the Batéké chiefs and their communities as defiant and difficult to govern. A dispute over a hippopotamus killed by the Léopoldville post commander and seized by Kinshasa villagers provided the administration with an opportunity to intervene militarily. When the Batéké refused to surrender the animal, troops supported by artillery were deployed and forced Chief Ntsuvila of Kinshasa and his people into submission. Following this, Chief Ntsuvila, Chief Bankwa of Ndolo, and their people crossed the river to seek refuge on the northern bank and pledged allegiance to French authority. They were allocated land at M'pila, "where they rebuilt a village". Chief Ngaliema of Kintambo followed suit some time later.

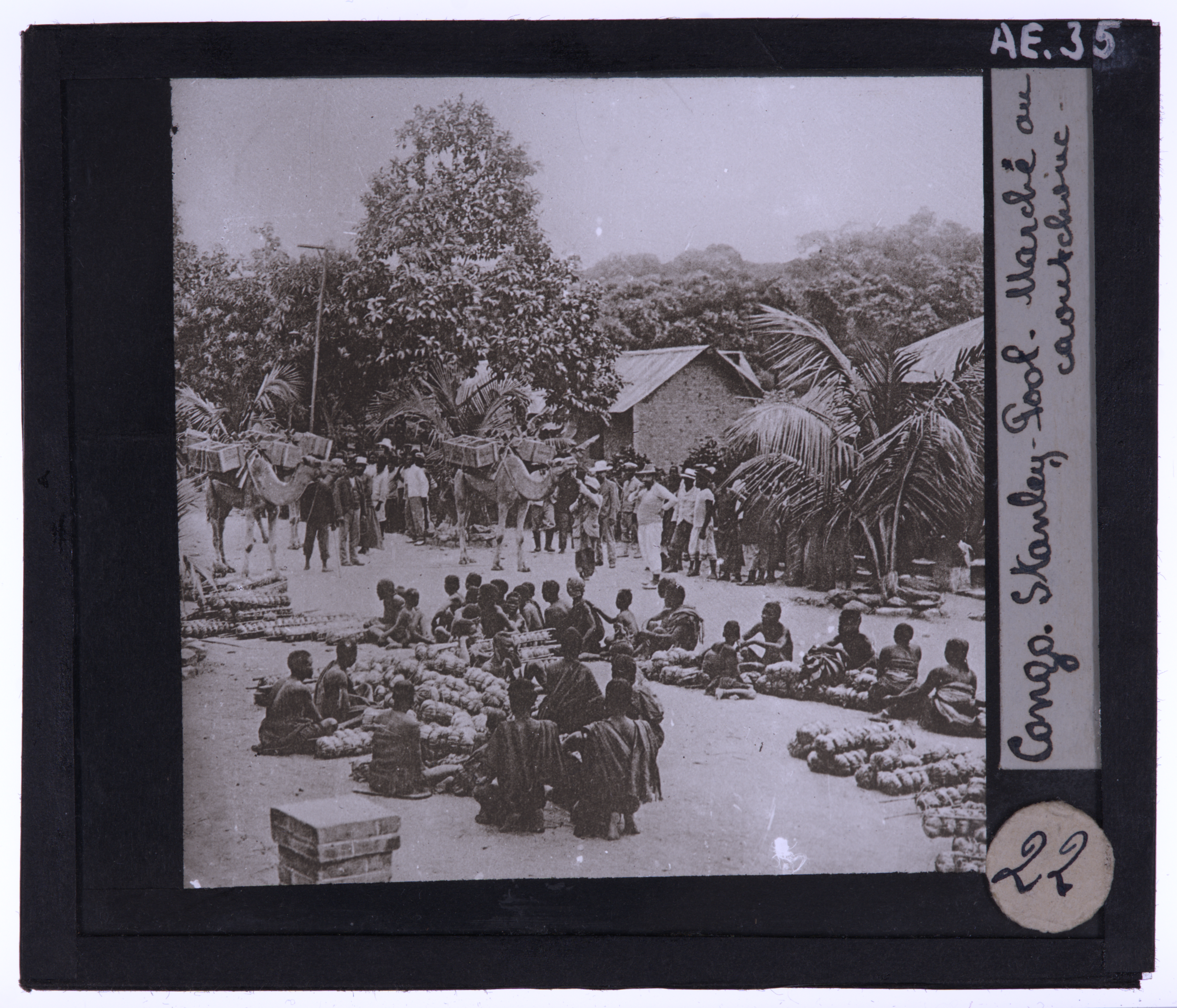
Rubber market (Marché au caoutchouc) at Stanley Pool during the Belgian colonial period.

With the Batéké villages of Kintambo, Kinshasa, and Ndolo deserted, the colonial administration gained the space and authority needed to implement its plans. Coffee, cocoa, and tobacco plantations were established on the sites of the former villages, and a training camp for the Force Publique was established in Kinshasa village, where recruits from Equatorial and West Africa underwent 18 months of instruction. Baobab trees that once characterized the village landscape were destroyed with explosives to make way for a military avenue, later known as Avenue des Aviateurs. Elsewhere along the southern bank, conditions were similarly harsh: Lemba was set on fire in 1888, and its inhabitants dispersed. At the time, colonization was framed as a rupture with an old order that was unfavorable to the indigenous population and as the initiator of a new, modern organization. Léon de Saint Moulin notes that the dismantling of traditional values was often deliberate, with missionaries and administrators employing ridicule to undermine social systems deemed incompatible with colonial goals. By the time sleeping sickness devastated much of the population, customary authority had already been severely weakened. Oral tradition nevertheless recognizes that a new social organization emerged, marking the beginnings of modern society. While some chiefs quickly adapted to new opportunities, urban centers remained under European control for decades and initially functioned primarily as labor reservoirs. From the 1910s and 1920s onward, new settlements multiplied in the plains and surrounding hills, often populated by individuals who had left their traditional environments and claimed a degree of autonomy. Meanwhile, colonial authorities imposed administrative divisions in the southern hinterland, grouping populations into chiefdoms under the 1906 law, reorganizing them again in 1910, and finally consolidating them into a single sector in 1935.

== Ecology ==
=== Climate ===
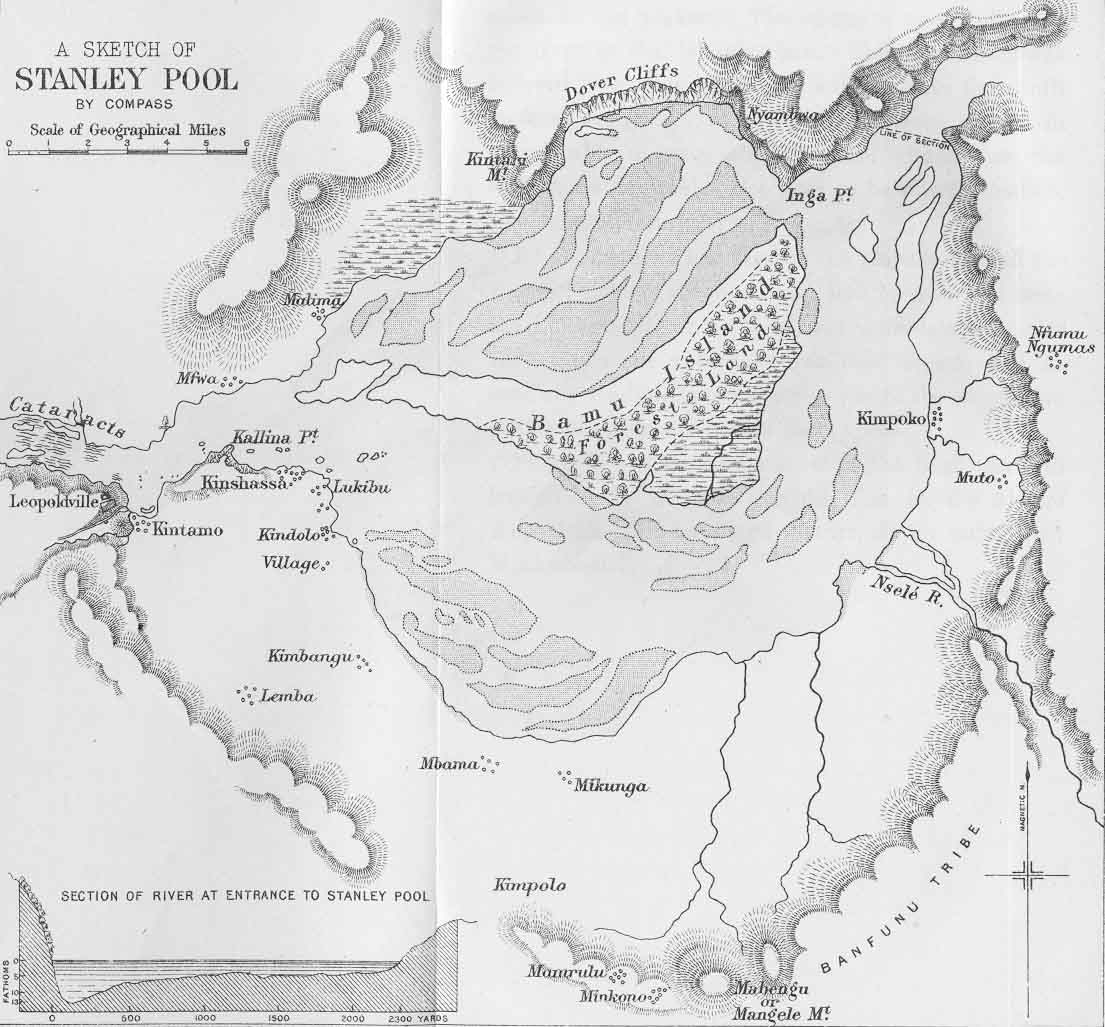
Map of Stanley Pool

The Pool Malebo area experiences an equatorial to tropical climate characterized by two principal seasons. The dry season lasts roughly three months, from June to August, while the rainy season extends from September to May, interrupted by a brief dry spell between January and February. Rainfall peaks in November, December, and March, whereas July is typically the driest month. Due to its low elevation, Kinshasa has a hot and humid tropical climate classified as AW4 under the Köppen climate classification, with a dry season from June to September and a rainy season from September through May.

=== Flora ===
Palm and papyrus swamps fringe the margins of the river and Pool Malebo, while floating mats of Eichhornia drift along the river channel and circulate within the pool. The aquatic vegetation is largely composed of hydrophytes, geophytes, and chaméphytes adapted to permanently or seasonally flooded environments. A floristic survey conducted in 2020 on Molondo, Mipongo, and Japon islands recorded 19 aquatic plant species, including 17 angiosperms and 2 pteridophytes, belonging to 15 families and 14 orders. These plants occupy habitats that range from open water to muddy and riparian environments.

A significant proportion of the aquatic flora consists of invasive species. Among them, Eichhornia crassipes and Echinochloa pyramidalis display invasive characteristics and are the most serious ecological threats. These species form dense monospecific mats that displace native vegetation, reduce habitat heterogeneity, and alter light and oxygen availability in the water column. Their spread is also facilitated by waterborne dispersal and human activities such as fishing, river traffic, market gardening, and rice cultivation along riverbanks, which introduce and redistribute plant propagules throughout the pool.

=== Fish ===
Most fish endemic to the area are catfishes, including the mountain catfish, L. brieni, Leptoglanis mandevillei, L. bouilloni and Atopochilus chabanaudi, an upside-down catfish. More than 200 fish species have been documented. Mormyrids are the most common, with over 40 species, and have the highest diversification.

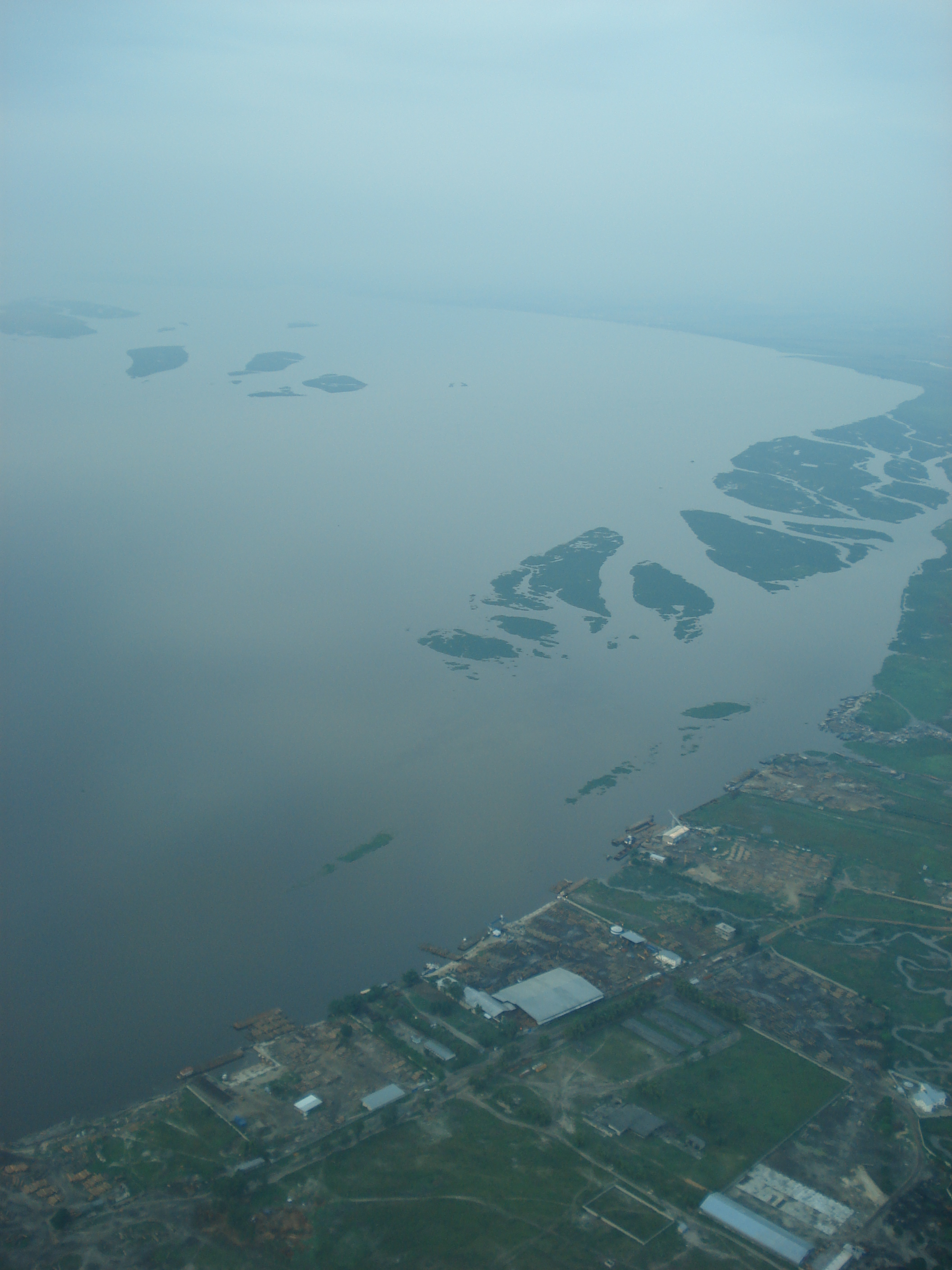
Aerial view of Pool Malebo from above Kinshasa

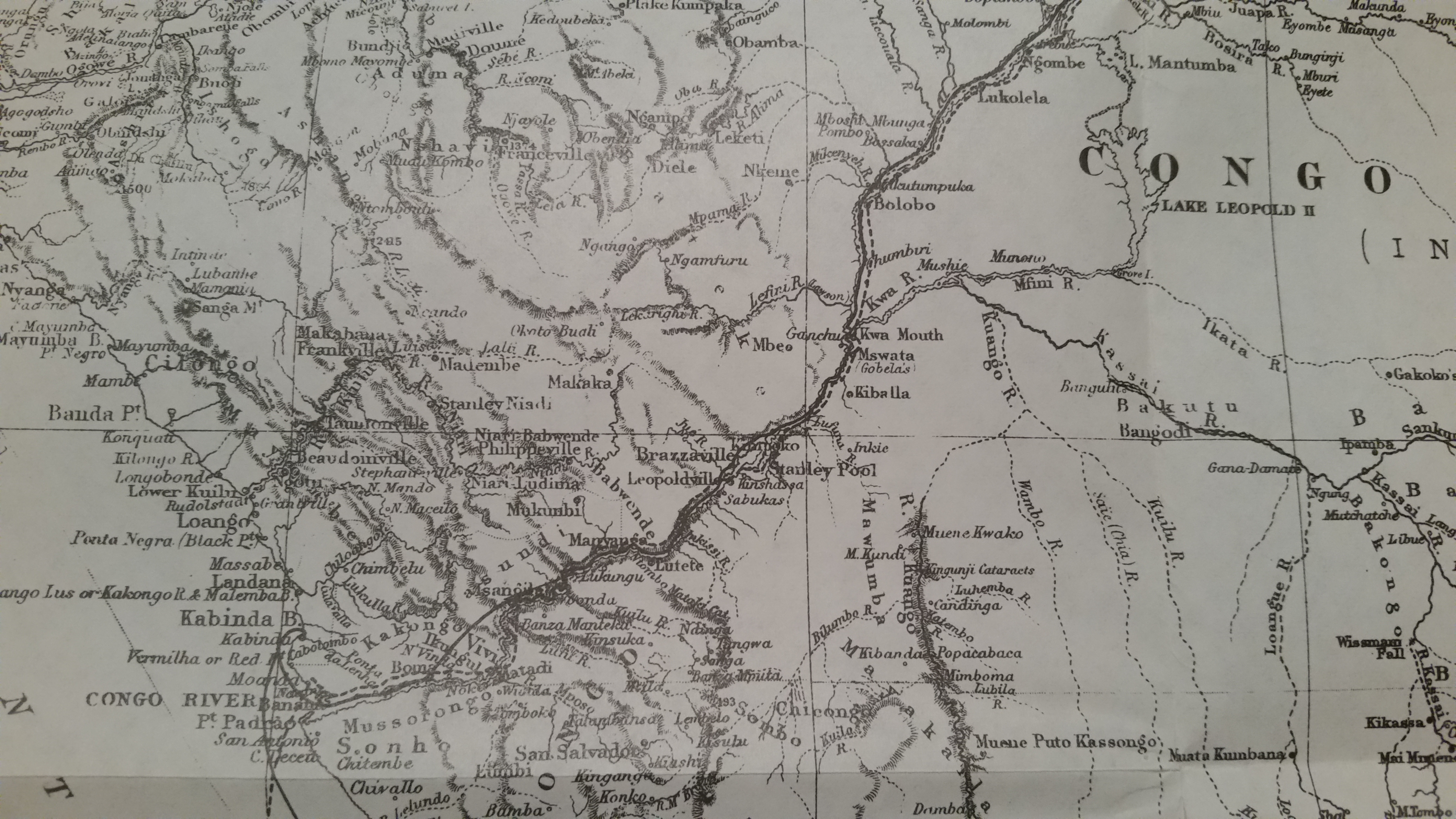
Stanley's route is depicted by the solid black line.

== See also ==
- Pombeiros
