= Boma language =

Bantu language of the western DR Congo

Boma
- Kiboma
- Native to: Democratic Republic of the Congo
- Native speakers: (21,000 cited 2000)
- Language family: Niger–Congo?: Atlantic–Congo; Benue–Congo; Bantoid; Bantu (Zone B); Boma–Dzing (B.80); Boma

Language codes
- ISO 639-3: boh
- Glottolog: boma1246 Boma Yumu kemp1234 Kempee
- Guthrie code: B.82

Boma is a Bantu language of the Democratic Republic of the Congo.

Maho (2009) considers Boma, B.821 Mpe (Kempee), and B.822 Nunu to be closely related languages. Mpe and Nunu do not have ISO codes. (Distinguish the Nunu dialect of Ngiri.)

== See also ==
- Eborna language
