= Voiceless labiodental affricate =

Consonantal sound

p̪f

Audio sample
- source · help
Image

A voiceless labiodental affricate ([p̪͡f] in IPA) is a rare affricate consonant that is initiated as a labiodental stop [p̪] and released as a voiceless labiodental fricative [f]. The dental diacritic in the stop is frequently omitted, yielding ⟨p͡f⟩.

The XiNkuna dialect of Tsonga has this affricate, as in [tiɱp̪͡fuβu] "hippopotamuses" and aspirated [ɱp̪͡fʰuka] "distance" (compare [ɱfutsu] "tortoise", which shows that the stop is not epenthetic), as well as a voiced labiodental affricate, [b̪͡v], as in [ʃileb̪͡vu] "chin". There is no voiceless labiodental fricative [f] in this dialect of Tsonga, only a voiceless bilabial fricative, as in [ɸu] "finished". (Among voiced fricatives, both [β] and [v] occur, however.)

German also has this sound in words like Pfeffer /ˈp͡fɛfɐ/ ('pepper') and Apfel /ˈap͡fəl/ ('apple'). Phonotactically, this sound does not occur after long vowels, diphthongs or /l/.

In many varieties of Central Plains Mandarin and Lanyin Mandarin, labialized retroflex fricatives and affricates [ʂʷ, tʂʷ, tʂʰʷ] (sometimes including [ʐʷ ~ ɻʷ]) become labiodental, respectively resulting in the production of [f, p̪͡f, p̪͡fʰ] (sometimes including [v]).

The sound occurs occasionally in English, in words where one syllable ends with "p" and the next starts with "f", like in "helpful" or "stepfather".

== Features ==
Features of a voiceless labiodental affricate:

- Its manner of articulation is affricate, which means it is produced by first stopping the airflow entirely, then allowing air flow through a constricted channel at the place of articulation, causing turbulence.
- Its place of articulation is labiodental, which means it is articulated with the lower lip and the upper teeth.
- Its phonation is voiceless, which means it is produced without vibrations of the vocal cords. In some languages the vocal cords are actively separated, so it is always voiceless; in others the cords are lax, so that it may take on the voicing of adjacent sounds.
- It is an oral consonant, which means that air is not allowed to escape through the nose.
- Because the sound is not produced with airflow over the tongue, the median–lateral dichotomy does not apply.
- Its airstream mechanism is pulmonic, which means it is articulated by pushing air only with the intercostal muscles and abdominal muscles, as in most speech sounds.

== Occurrence ==
Language		Word	IPA	Meaning	Notes
Burushaski		iphusimi	[ip̪͡fusimi]	'he ties him'	In free variation with /pʰ/. May also be realized as /f/.
English	Some speakers	helpful	[ˈhɛɫp̚ˌp̪͡fəɫ]	'helpful'	Occurs for some speakers in consonant clusters of /pf/
English	Some speakers	info	[ˈɪɱˌp̪͡fəʊ̯]	'info'	Allophone of /f/ after nasal consonants for some speakers as a form of epenthesis; usually occurs during fast and casual speech.
German	Standard	Pfirsiche	[ˈp̪͡fɪɐ̯zɪçə]	'peaches'	Arose as a reflex of /p/ in the 8th century High German sound shift. See Standard German phonology
German	Swiss dialects	Soipfe	[ˈz̥oi̯p̪͡fə]	'soap'	The example word is from the Zürich dialect.
Ghomalaʼ					
Italian	Some central-south dialects	infatti	[iɱˈp̪͡fät̪̚t̪i]	'indeed'	Allophone of /f/ after nasals. See Italian phonology
Luxembourgish		Kampf	[ˈkʰɑmp̪͡f]	'fight'	Occurs only in Standard German loanwords. See Luxembourgish phonology
Ngiti		pfɔ̀mvɔ	[p̪͡fɔ̀ɱ(b̪)vɔ̄]	'water spirit'	Less commonly [p͡ɸ]
Kinyarwanda		gupfundikira	[gup̪͡fu:ndiciɾa]	'to close, seal'	
Central Plains Mandarin	Guanzhong dialect	猪/豬 zhū	[p̪͡fú˦˥]	'pig'	The labialized retroflex fricatives and affricates in Old Mandarin became labiodental. Possible route: [tʂʷ] > [tf] > [p̪͡f].
Central Plains Mandarin	Yanhe dialect	砖/磚 zhuān	[p̪͡fã˨˦]	'brick'	The labialized retroflex fricatives and affricates in Old Mandarin became labiodental. Possible route: [tʂʷ] > [tf] > [p̪͡f].
Central Plains Mandarin	Dungan Language	穿 чуaн	[p̪͡fʰæ̃˨˦]	'to wear'	The labialized retroflex fricatives and affricates in Old Mandarin became labiodental. Possible route: [tʂʷ] > [tf] > [p̪͡f].
Slovene		pfenig	[ˈp̪féːnìk]	'pfennig'	Rarely occurs, mostly in German loanwords. See Slovene phonology
Sopvoma		ōpfǒ	[o̞˧p̪͡fo̞˦]	'father'	Aspirated [p̪͡fʰ] in some words, in free variation. "ǒ" represents a "Higher Mid" tone between the Mid and Lower High tones found in some speakers.
Tsonga	XiNkuna dialect	timpfuvu	[tiɱp̪͡fuβu]	'hippopotami'	Contrasts with aspirated form.

== Notes ==
Place →	Labial					Coronal										Dorsal					Laryngeal			
Manner ↓	Bilabial		Labiodental		Linguolabial		Dental		Alveolar		Postalveolar		Retroflex		(Alveolo-)palatal		Velar		Uvular		Pharyngeal/epiglottal		Glottal	
Nasal	m̥	m	ɱ̊	ɱ		n̼	n̪̊	n̪	n̥	n	n̠̊	n̠	ɳ̊	ɳ	ɲ̊	ɲ	ŋ̊	ŋ	ɴ̥	ɴ				
Plosive	p	b	p̪	b̪	t̼	d̼	t̪	d̪	t	d			ʈ	ɖ	c	ɟ	k	ɡ	q	ɢ	ʡ		ʔ	
Sibilant affricate							t̪s̪	d̪z̪	ts	dz	t̠ʃ	d̠ʒ	tʂ	dʐ	tɕ	dʑ								
Non-sibilant affricate	pɸ	bβ	p̪f	b̪v			t̪θ	d̪ð	tɹ̝̊	dɹ̝	t̠ɹ̠̊˔	d̠ɹ̠˔			cç	ɟʝ	kx	ɡɣ	qχ	ɢʁ	ʡʜ	ʡʢ	ʔh	
Sibilant fricative							s̪	z̪	s	z	ʃ	ʒ	ʂ	ʐ	ɕ	ʑ								
Non-sibilant fricative	ɸ	β	f	v	θ̼	ð̼	θ	ð	θ̠	ð̠	ɹ̠̊˔	ɹ̠˔	ɻ̊˔	ɻ˔	ç	ʝ	x	ɣ	χ	ʁ	ħ	ʕ	h	ɦ
Approximant		β̞		ʋ				ð̞		ɹ		ɹ̠		ɻ		j		ɰ						˷
Tap/flap		ⱱ̟		ⱱ					ɾ̥	ɾ			ɽ̊	ɽ						ɢ̆		ʡ̆		
Trill	ʙ̥	ʙ							r̥	r		r̠	ɽ̊r̥	ɽr					ʀ̥	ʀ	ʜ	ʢ		
Lateral affricate									tɬ	dɮ			tꞎ	d𝼅	c𝼆	ɟʎ̝	k𝼄	ɡʟ̝						
Lateral fricative							ɬ̪		ɬ	ɮ			ꞎ	𝼅	𝼆	ʎ̝	𝼄	ʟ̝						
Lateral approximant								l̪	l̥	l		l̠	ɭ̊	ɭ	ʎ̥	ʎ	ʟ̥	ʟ		ʟ̠				
Lateral tap/flap									ɺ̥	ɺ			𝼈̊	𝼈		ʎ̆		ʟ̆						

		BL	LD	D	A	PA	RF	P	V	U
Implosive	Voiced	ɓ			ɗ		ᶑ	ʄ	ɠ	ʛ
Implosive	Voiceless	ɓ̥			ɗ̥		ᶑ̊	ʄ̊	ɠ̊	ʛ̥
Ejective	Stop	pʼ			tʼ		ʈʼ	cʼ	kʼ	qʼ
Ejective	Affricate		p̪fʼ	t̪θʼ	tsʼ	t̠ʃʼ	tʂʼ	tɕʼ	kxʼ	qχʼ
Ejective	Fricative	ɸʼ	fʼ	θʼ	sʼ	ʃʼ	ʂʼ	ɕʼ	xʼ	χʼ
Ejective	Lateral affricate				tɬʼ			c𝼆ʼ	k𝼄ʼ	q𝼄ʼ
Ejective	Lateral fricative				ɬʼ					
Click (top: velar; bottom: uvular)	Tenuis	kʘ qʘ		kǀ qǀ	kǃ qǃ		k𝼊 q𝼊	kǂ qǂ		
Click (top: velar; bottom: uvular)	Voiced	ɡʘ ɢʘ		ɡǀ ɢǀ	ɡǃ ɢǃ		ɡ𝼊 ɢ𝼊	ɡǂ ɢǂ		
Click (top: velar; bottom: uvular)	Nasal	ŋʘ ɴʘ		ŋǀ ɴǀ	ŋǃ ɴǃ		ŋ𝼊 ɴ𝼊	ŋǂ ɴǂ	ʞ	
Click (top: velar; bottom: uvular)	Tenuis lateral				kǁ qǁ					
Click (top: velar; bottom: uvular)	Voiced lateral				ɡǁ ɢǁ					
Click (top: velar; bottom: uvular)	Nasal lateral				ŋǁ ɴǁ					
