= Voiced labiodental affricate =

Consonantal sound

b̪v

Audio sample
- source · help
Image

A voiced labiodental affricate ([b̪͜v] in IPA) is a rare affricate consonant that is initiated as a voiced labiodental stop [b̪] and released as a voiced labiodental fricative [v]. The dental diacritic is frequently omitted from the stop component in transcriptions of the sound, yielding ⟨b͜v⟩.

== Features ==
Features of a voiced labiodental affricate:

- Its manner of articulation is affricate, which means it is produced by first stopping the airflow entirely, then allowing air flow through a constricted channel at the place of articulation, causing turbulence.
- Its place of articulation is labiodental, which means it is articulated with the lower lip and the upper teeth.
- Its phonation is voiced, which means the vocal cords vibrate during the articulation.
- It is an oral consonant, which means that air is not allowed to escape through the nose.
- Because the sound is not produced with airflow over the tongue, the median–lateral dichotomy does not apply.
- Its airstream mechanism is pulmonic, which means it is articulated by pushing air only with the intercostal muscles and abdominal muscles, as in most speech sounds.

== Occurrence ==
Language		Word	IPA	Meaning	Notes
Chinese	Teochew	未來 / bhuê^{7} lai^{5}	[b̪͡vue˦˧ lai˨˧]	'future'	Allophone of /b/ before /u/ in Chaoyang dialect
Chinese	Some Central Plains Mandarin dialects	脊椎 / jǐ zhuī	[tɕi˥b̪͡ve˨˦]	'backbone'	The labialized retroflex fricatives and affricates [ʂʷ, tʂʷ, tʂʰʷ](sometimes including [ʐʷ~ɻʷ]) in Old Mandarin (respectively represented by sh, zh, ch in modern Standard Mandarin) become the labiodental [f, p̪͡f, p̪͡fʰ] (sometimes including [v]).The unaspirated [p̪͡f] occasionally becomes voiced under intervocalic situations.
English	Some speakers	invent	[ɪɱˈb̪͡vent]	'invent'	Allophone of /v/ after nasal consonants for some speakers. Usually occurs in fast and/or casual speech.
English	Some speakers	obvious	[ˈɑb̪͡viəs]	'obvious'	Occasional pronunciation of a /bv/ or /pv/ consonant cluster.
Italian	Some central-south dialects	in vetta	[iɱˈb̪͡vet̪t̪ä]	'at the top'	Labiodental; allophone of /v/ after nasals. See Italian phonology
Luxembourgish		Kampf am Ënnergrond	[ˈkʰɑmb̪͡v ɑm ˈənɐɡʀont]	'underground battle'	Allophone of a word-final /pf/ before a word-initial vowel. Occurs only in German loanwords. See Luxembourgish phonology
Ngiti		abvɔ	[āb̪͡vɔ̄]	'thorny vine'	Less commonly [b͡β]
Sopvoma (Mao)		bvóthà	[b̪͡vótʰà]	'kill by goring'	Distinct from the voiced labiodental fricative [v].
Tsonga	XiNkuna dialect	shilebvu	[ʃileb̪͡vu]	'chin'	

== Notes ==
Place →	Labial					Coronal										Dorsal					Laryngeal			
Manner ↓	Bilabial		Labiodental		Linguolabial		Dental		Alveolar		Postalveolar		Retroflex		(Alveolo-)palatal		Velar		Uvular		Pharyngeal/epiglottal		Glottal	
Nasal	m̥	m	ɱ̊	ɱ		n̼	n̪̊	n̪	n̥	n	n̠̊	n̠	ɳ̊	ɳ	ɲ̊	ɲ	ŋ̊	ŋ	ɴ̥	ɴ				
Plosive	p	b	p̪	b̪	t̼	d̼	t̪	d̪	t	d			ʈ	ɖ	c	ɟ	k	ɡ	q	ɢ	ʡ		ʔ	
Sibilant affricate							t̪s̪	d̪z̪	ts	dz	t̠ʃ	d̠ʒ	tʂ	dʐ	tɕ	dʑ								
Non-sibilant affricate	pɸ	bβ	p̪f	b̪v			t̪θ	d̪ð	tɹ̝̊	dɹ̝	t̠ɹ̠̊˔	d̠ɹ̠˔			cç	ɟʝ	kx	ɡɣ	qχ	ɢʁ	ʡʜ	ʡʢ	ʔh	
Sibilant fricative							s̪	z̪	s	z	ʃ	ʒ	ʂ	ʐ	ɕ	ʑ								
Non-sibilant fricative	ɸ	β	f	v	θ̼	ð̼	θ	ð	θ̠	ð̠	ɹ̠̊˔	ɹ̠˔	ɻ̊˔	ɻ˔	ç	ʝ	x	ɣ	χ	ʁ	ħ	ʕ	h	ɦ
Approximant		β̞		ʋ				ð̞		ɹ		ɹ̠		ɻ		j		ɰ						˷
Tap/flap		ⱱ̟		ⱱ					ɾ̥	ɾ			ɽ̊	ɽ						ɢ̆		ʡ̆		
Trill	ʙ̥	ʙ							r̥	r		r̠	ɽ̊r̥	ɽr					ʀ̥	ʀ	ʜ	ʢ		
Lateral affricate									tɬ	dɮ			tꞎ	d𝼅	c𝼆	ɟʎ̝	k𝼄	ɡʟ̝						
Lateral fricative							ɬ̪		ɬ	ɮ			ꞎ	𝼅	𝼆	ʎ̝	𝼄	ʟ̝						
Lateral approximant								l̪	l̥	l		l̠	ɭ̊	ɭ	ʎ̥	ʎ	ʟ̥	ʟ		ʟ̠				
Lateral tap/flap									ɺ̥	ɺ			𝼈̊	𝼈		ʎ̆		ʟ̆						

		BL	LD	D	A	PA	RF	P	V	U
Implosive	Voiced	ɓ			ɗ		ᶑ	ʄ	ɠ	ʛ
Implosive	Voiceless	ɓ̥			ɗ̥		ᶑ̊	ʄ̊	ɠ̊	ʛ̥
Ejective	Stop	pʼ			tʼ		ʈʼ	cʼ	kʼ	qʼ
Ejective	Affricate		p̪fʼ	t̪θʼ	tsʼ	t̠ʃʼ	tʂʼ	tɕʼ	kxʼ	qχʼ
Ejective	Fricative	ɸʼ	fʼ	θʼ	sʼ	ʃʼ	ʂʼ	ɕʼ	xʼ	χʼ
Ejective	Lateral affricate				tɬʼ			c𝼆ʼ	k𝼄ʼ	q𝼄ʼ
Ejective	Lateral fricative				ɬʼ					
Click (top: velar; bottom: uvular)	Tenuis	kʘ qʘ		kǀ qǀ	kǃ qǃ		k𝼊 q𝼊	kǂ qǂ		
Click (top: velar; bottom: uvular)	Voiced	ɡʘ ɢʘ		ɡǀ ɢǀ	ɡǃ ɢǃ		ɡ𝼊 ɢ𝼊	ɡǂ ɢǂ		
Click (top: velar; bottom: uvular)	Nasal	ŋʘ ɴʘ		ŋǀ ɴǀ	ŋǃ ɴǃ		ŋ𝼊 ɴ𝼊	ŋǂ ɴǂ	ʞ	
Click (top: velar; bottom: uvular)	Tenuis lateral				kǁ qǁ					
Click (top: velar; bottom: uvular)	Voiced lateral				ɡǁ ɢǁ					
Click (top: velar; bottom: uvular)	Nasal lateral				ŋǁ ɴǁ					
