= Pinger (disambiguation) =

Pinger is a texting and VoIP app developing company.

Pinger may also refer to:

- Ping'er, fictional character in Dream of the Red Chamber
- PingER Project, an internet performance reporting tool
- Textfree (formerly called Pinger), a phone and texting app
- Underwater locator beacon

== See also ==
- Binger (surname)
- Dinger (disambiguation)
- Ping (disambiguation)
- Pinge (surname) pronounced as "Pinger"
