= Binge =

Binge or binges may refer to:

== Behavior ==
- Binge drinking, heavy consumption of alcohol
- Binge eating, disordered eating pattern
- Binge-watching, watching visual entertainment such as a TV series over a long continuous period

== Arts, entertainment, and media ==
=== Film ===
- The Binge, a 2020 American comedy film

=== Music ===
- "Binge", a song from the Papa Roach album Infest
- Binge (EP), a 2018 EP by Machine Gun Kelly
- Binge Records, an indie rock record label

=== TV and streaming ===
- Binge (Bangladeshi streaming service), a Bangladeshi live TV & video streaming service
- Binge (streaming service), an Australian streaming service owned by Foxtel
- Binge (TV channel), a former Australian cable television channel

== People ==
- Caleb Binge (born 1993), Australian rugby league footballer
- Dagmar Anita Binge, German founder of Binge Discs (country music specialists)
- Ronald Binge (1910–1979), British composer and arranger of light music

== Other uses ==
- Binge (mining), a depression in the terrain caused by mining activity
- Binges, Côte-d'Or, a commune in eastern France

== See also ==
- Bing (disambiguation)
- Bingen (disambiguation)
- Binger, a surname
