= Ding =

Ding may refer to:

== Bronze and ceramics ==
- Ding (vessel), a bronze or ceramic cauldron used in ancient and early imperial China
- Ding ware, ceramics produced in Dingzhou in medieval China

== People ==
- Ding (surname) (丁), a Chinese surname and list of people with the name
- Duke Ding of Jin (died 475 BC), ruler of Jin
- Duke Ding of Qi, tenth century ruler of Qi
- Empress Dowager Ding (died 402), empress dowager of the state of Later Yan
- King Ding of Zhou, king of the Zhou Dynasty in ancient China from 606 to 586 BC
- Ding Darling (1876–1962), American cartoonist who signed his work "Ding"
- Ding, a buddy or ally of Mars Ravelo's character Darna

== Arts and entertainment ==
- "Ding" (song), by Seeed
- Ding, the nickname of Domingo Chavez, a recurring character in Tom Clancy's novels and video games
- Ding, a webcomic by Scott Kurtz
- D!NG, a spinoff web channel from Vsauce

== Places ==
- Dingzhou, formerly Ding County and Ding Prefecture, China
- Ding railway station, Haryana, India

== Other uses ==
- (ding) or Gnus, a news reader
- Ding language, Bantu language spoken in the Democratic Republic of Congo
- Donau-Iller-Nahverkehrsverbund (DING), a German regional transport cooperative
- ding up, to dent, bend, or injure
- Ding (company), international mobile recharge service

== See also ==
- Dinge
- Dinger (disambiguation)
- Bing (disambiguation)
- Ping (disambiguation)
