= Seilkopf Peaks =

Mountain in Queen Maud Land, Antarctica

Coordinates: 72°41′S 4°0′W

Seilkopf Peaks (German: Seilkopfberge) is a group of mainly ice-free peaks and ridges between Portalen Pass and Nalegga Ridge in the Borg Massif, Queen Maud Land. The feature was photographed from the air by the German Antarctic Expedition (1938–39) and named for Heinrich Seilkopf, head of the marine aerology section of the Deutsche Seewarte (German Hydrographic Office) in Hamburg. Although rudely mapped by German Antarctic Expedition, the Seilkopf Peaks are clearly shown and identified in air photos published by the expedition. The peaks were mapped in detail by the Norwegian-British-Swedish Antarctic Expedition (NBSAE) (1949–52).
