= Dalsnuten Peak =

Mountain in Antarctica

Dalsnuten Peak (72°36′S 3°11′W) is a peak rising above the ice in the northeast part of Raudberg Valley just north of Jokulskarvet Ridge, in the Borg Massif of Queen Maud Land. It was mapped by Norwegian cartographers from surveys and air photos by the Norwegian–British–Swedish Antarctic Expedition (1949–52) and named Dalsnuten (the valley peak).
