= Svellnuten Peak =

Svellnuten Peak (72°40′S 3°9′W) is a low peak at the east side of Jokulskarvet Ridge, in the Borg Massif of Queen Maud Land. Mapped by Norwegian cartographers from surveys and air photos by Norwegian-British-Swedish Antarctic Expedition (NBSAE) (1949–52), and named Svellnuten (the icesheet peak) in association with the nearby slope, Breidsvellet.
