= Bommen Spur =

Spur or small ridge in Queen Maud Land, Antarctica

Bommen Spur (72°37′S 3°8′W) is a spur, or small ridge, extending eastward from Jokulskarvet Ridge to Flogstallen, in the Borg Massif of Queen Maud Land. It was mapped by Norwegian cartographers from surveys and from air photos by the Norwegian–British–Swedish Antarctic Expedition (1949–52) and named "Bommen" (the bar).
