= Binger =

Binger is a German and Danish surname. Notable people with the surname include:

- Carl Binger (1889–1976), American psychiatrist
- Glenn Binger (1931-2009), American politician from Missouri
- James H. Binger (1916–2004), American lawyer and chief executive
- Louis Gustave Binger (1856–1936), French explorer
- Maurits Binger (1868–1923), Dutch film director, producer and screenwriter
- Michael Binger (born 1976), American poker player
- Ray Binger (1888–1970), American cinematographer
- Thomas Binger, American lawyer and government official

== See also ==
- Pinge (surname)
- Binge (disambiguation)
- Bing (disambiguation)
- Pinger (disambiguation)
- Dinger (disambiguation)
