= Nålegga Ridge =

Ridge of Queen Maud Land, Antarctica

Nalegga Ridge (72°39′S 4°3′W) is a narrow rock ridge marking the north end of Seilkopf Peaks in the Borg Massif, Queen Maud Land. Mapped by Norwegian cartographers from surveys and air photos by Norwegian-British-Swedish Antarctic Expedition (NBSAE) (1949–52) and named Nalegga (the needle ridge).

== See also ==
- Knappane Peaks, a string of separated rock peaks just west of Nålegga Ridge
