= Jøkulgavlen Ridge =

Flat-topped ridge in Antarctica

Jøkulgavlen Ridge (72°42′S 3°21′W) is a prominent flat-topped ridge forming the south part of Jokulskarvet Ridge, in the Borg Massif of Queen Maud Land, Antarctica. It was mapped by Norwegian cartographers from surveys and air photos by the Norwegian–British–Swedish Antarctic Expedition (1949–52) and named Jøkulgavlen (the glacier gable).
