= Breidsvellet =

Ice slope in Queen Maud Land, Antarctica

Breidsvellet (72°39′S 3°10′W) is a steep ice slope on the east side of Jokulskarvet Ridge, in the Borg Massif of Queen Maud Land, Antarctica. It was mapped by Norwegian cartographers from surveys and from air photos by the Norwegian–British–Swedish Antarctic Expedition (1949–52) and named Breidsvellet (the "broad icesheet").
