= Midbresrabben Hill =

Hill in Antarctica

Midbresrabben Hill (72°44′S 2°6′W) is an isolated rock hill protruding above the ice between Penck Trough and Jutulstraumen Glacier, east of the Borg Massif in Queen Maud Land, Antarctica. It was mapped by Norwegian cartographers from surveys and air photos by the Norwegian–British–Swedish Antarctic Expedition (1949–52) and from air photos by the Norwegian expedition (1958–59) and named "Midbresrabben" (the mid-glacier ridge).
