= Nemo (American band) =

American indie rock band

- Origin: Brooklyn, NY
- Genres: Indie rock, rock
- Years active: 2002-2005
- Labels: Binge Records
- Members: Dennis Tyhacz, Luke McCartney

Nemo was an American indie rock band formed in Brooklyn, New York in 2002 by Luke McCartney and Dennis Tyhacz. The band took their name from the character Captain Nemo in Jules Verne's 1870 novel Twenty Thousand Leagues Under the Seas.

Their debut album Signs of Life was released in June 2004 on Binge Records. The album was notable for its blend of new wave, ethereal acoustic sounds, and inspired indie rock. It was recorded entirely in an apartment in Williamsburg, Brooklyn in 2003 prior to becoming one of the final LPs to be mastered at the Vic Thrill Salon in Brooklyn (shortly before the Salon was closed in 2004). The title track "Signs of Life" was featured in Season 2 of the PBS show Roadtrip Nation in 2005, and several of the songs on Signs of Life were also used as the backing music for NPR's Morning Edition show for several years after the album's initial release. McCartney and Tyhacz later recorded in a group in 2006 called The Sound Mirrors, and they released one LP The Calling in 2007, also on Binge Records.

== Members ==
Luke McCartney, Dennis Tyhacz

Additional members (touring and/or recording): Chris Plyem, Sam McCall

== Albums ==
- Signs of Life Binge Records, 2004

== Track listing ==
1. Metropolitan – 3:11
2. Northern Light – 2:39
3. The Burn – 1:59
4. Aviator – 2:23
5. Signs of Life – 3:05
6. Lunar Ship to Mars -2:33
7. Fiction of Reality – 2:34
8. Hampshire Brush – 2:39
9. Odyssey – 3:13
10. The Chariot – 2:20
11. Swimming in the Rhine – 2:33
12. Fall Away – 2:23
13. Killer Bees – 1:17
14. Eternity of This – 2:40
15. The Sun of Ulee – 2:58
16. Ether – 1:53
17. Harbor – 2:34
