= Høgsaetet Mountain =

Mountain in Antarctica

Høgsaetet Mountain (72°35′S 3°23′W) is a 2,717-metre (8,914 ft) tall mountain just northeast of Raudberget in the Borg Massif of Queen Maud Land, Antarctica. It was mapped by Norwegian cartographers from surveys and air photos by the Norwegian–British–Swedish Antarctic Expedition (1949–52) and named Høgsætet (the high seat).
