= Vindegga Ridge =

Vindegga Ridge (72°57′S 3°46′W) is a ridge of low peaks extending north from Huldreslottet Mountain, in the south part of Borg Massif in Queen Maud Land. Mapped by Norwegian cartographers from surveys and air photos by Norwegian-British-Swedish Antarctic Expedition (NBSAE) (1949–52) and named Vindegga (the wind ridge).
