= Bärenstein (Altenberg) =

- Stadtteil of Altenberg, Saxony
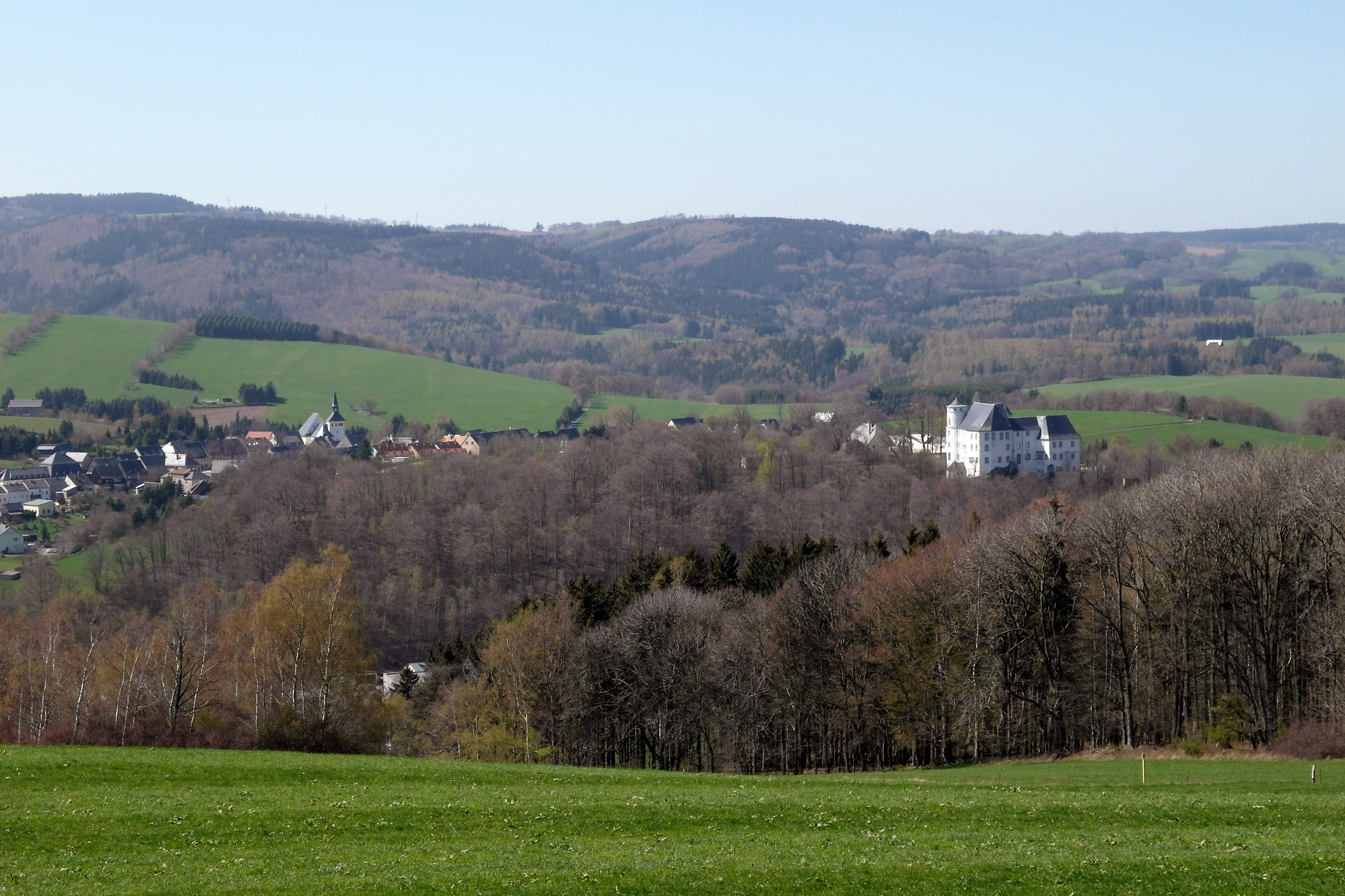
- View of Bärenstein
- Interactive map of Bärenstein
- Location within Germany Location within Saxony
- Coordinates: 50°48′N 13°48′E
- Country: Germany
- State: Saxony
- Town: Altenberg, Saxony
- Time zone: UTC+01:00 (CET)
  - Summer (DST): UTC+02:00 (CEST)

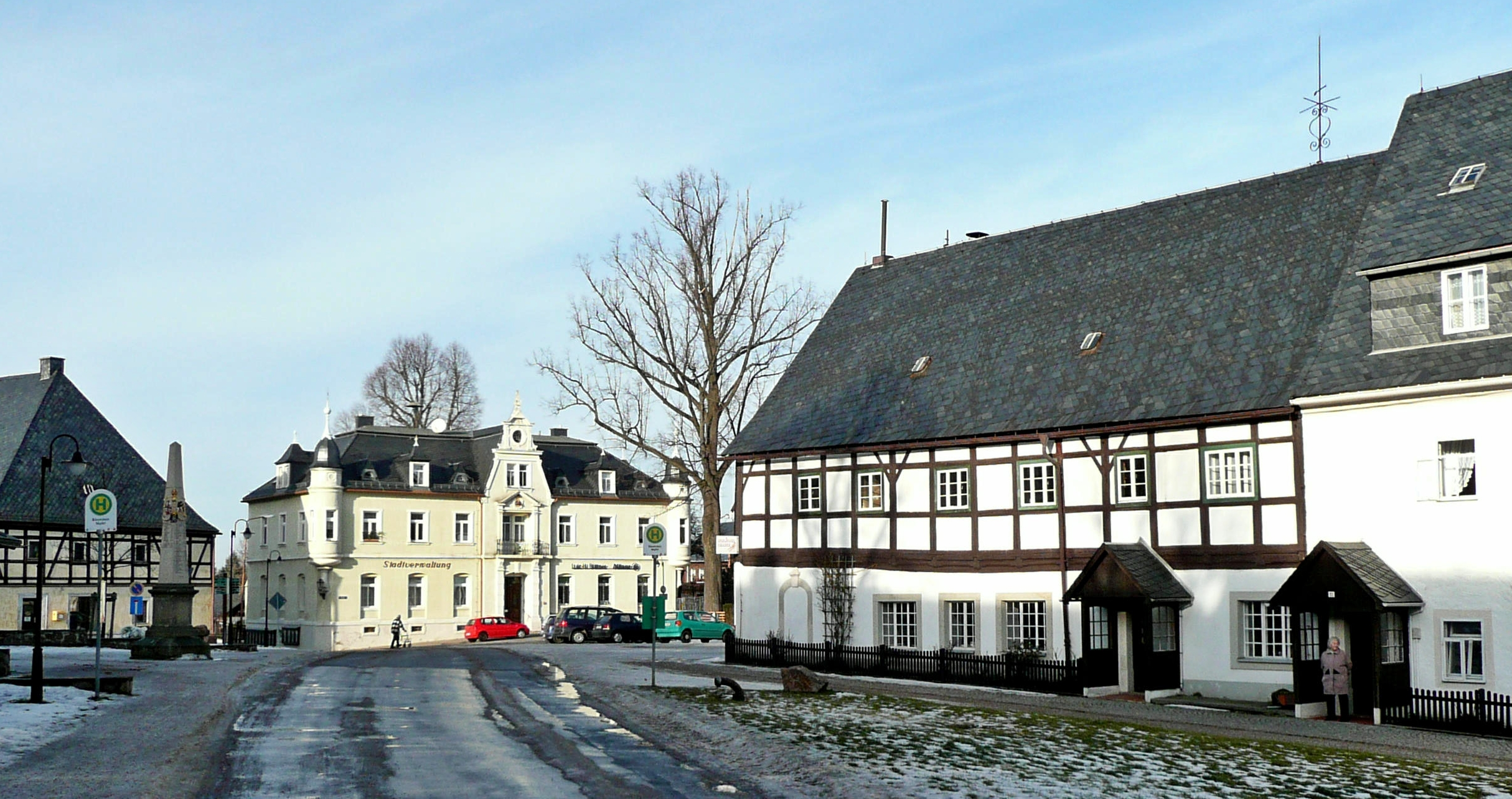
The market of Bärenstein with the column from 1734 (left), the new town hall from 1895 (center) and the old town hall (right)

Bärenstein is a Stadtteil (urban division) of the Saxon town of Altenberg. With its castle, it is one of oldest settlements in the Eastern Ore Mountains. It has a population of 876 people in 2021.

== Geography ==
Bärenstein is located about 40 km south of Dresden in the Eastern Ore Mountains in the upper valley of the Müglitz river. The Müglitztalstraße S 178 connects Bärenstein to Lauenstein and Bärenhecke. The Müglitz Valley Railway (Altenberg–Heidenau) runs parallel to the town. The town covers an area of 1,197 hectares and is surrounded by the Sachsenhöhe (632 meters above sea level), Kesselhöhe (655 meters above sea level), and Börnchenerhöhe (582 meters above sea level).

The neighboring villages of Bärenstein include Falkenhain, Lauenstein, Hirschsprung, Bärenhecke, and Liebenau. Bärenstein is in close to the town of Glashütte, known worldwide for its watchmaking industry.

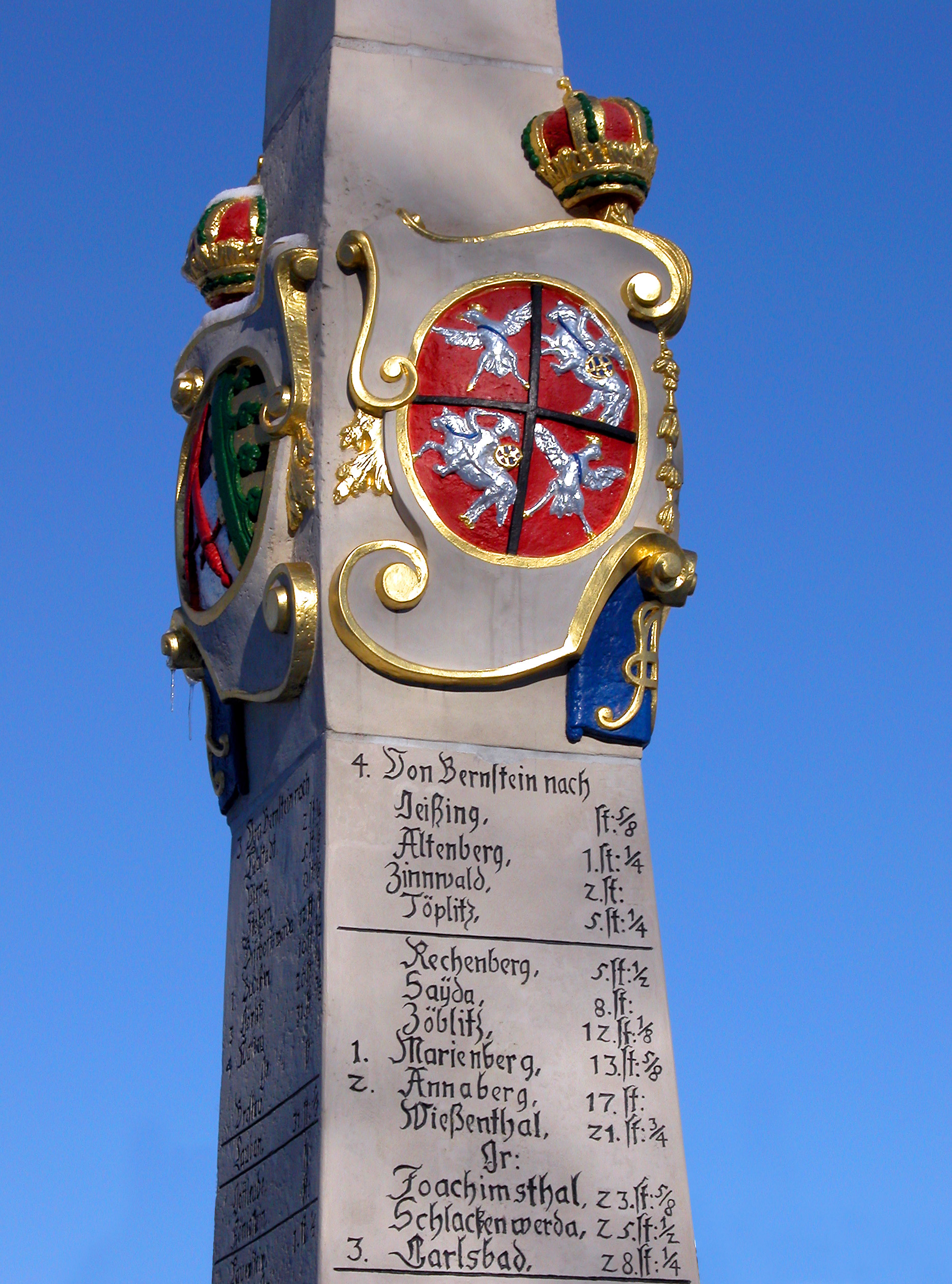

== History ==
Bärenstein was first mentioned in 1165, in connection with a knight Albrecht von Bernstein, who came from Switzerland and participated in a tournament in Zurich. In 1324 the village Bernstein was mentioned for the first time (HStA, Orig. Urk. Nr. 2319). In 1348 Walzko (Walzig) of Bernstein received Bernstein Castle from Margrave Frederick the Elder (the Lean) of Meissen as a fief. Around 1400 there were the first tin discoveries. In 1435 Peter von Bernstein defended the village against the invading Hussite armies. In 1436 tin mining began in the solid rock. In 1446, the lords of Bernstein sold the fourth part of their castle to the elector. This included the area of the present Altenberg, and later they also lent the tin mines. In 1449 a judge was mentioned in the tax register of the village. Walzig von Bernstein took over the rule of the village in 1453, and in 1462 also the electoral share. He became the owner of the castle Bärenstein with the villages Börnchen, Dittersdorf, Falkenhain, the mountain Geising, Johnsbach, Waltersdorf and his part of tithes. In 1458 Graupener miners started their mining work at the Müglitz, near Bärenstein.

In 1734 the Electoral Saxon Post Milestone Column was erected. In 1738 there was a big fire in the town.

On May 9, 1945, the Red Army marched into Bärenstein, and in the same year, on October 10, the von Lüttichau family had to leave the castle.

Bärenstein became Resort town in 1964. In 1988 a small town bath was inaugurated next to the school. On December 8, 1991, the 1st Bärenstein Christmas market took place. In 1998, the city bought the site of the former sawmill in order to set up a commercial area on it. In 1999 the city bought the station building for 80,000 DM to later use it as a museum. In 2006 the new market fountain with historical column was inaugurated.

== Incorporation ==
On June 28, 1956, the Bärenstein city councilors decided to regroup the districts at Lauenstein station and Hartmannmühle to Lauenstein and Geising, respectively. The town of Bärenstein applied to the district council for the return of the districts at Lauenstein and Hartmannmühle stations, which had been reclassified in 1956. On March 1, 1994, Bärenstein and Lauenstein were merged into the "Stadt Bärenstein" with the administrative headquarters in Lauenstein. Hartmut Kohl was elected mayor. On June 11, 1996, approval was given for the reorganization of the district of Lauenstein to Geising. This reclassification was completed on August 1, 1996. On June 15, 1999, the joint agreement on the administrative community Altenberg - Bärenstein - Hermsdorf was signed.

Bärenstein has been a district of Altenberg since January 1, 2004.
