= Pilarryggen =

Pilarryggen (72°42′S 3°56′W) is a rock ridge at the west side of Portalen Pass in the Borg Massif of Queen Maud Land. Mapped by Norwegian cartographers from surveys and air photos by Norwegian-British-Swedish Antarctic Expedition (NBSAE) (1949–52) and named Pilarryggen (the pillar ridge).
