= Småtind Peak =

Mountain in Queen Maud Land, Antarctica

Småtind Peak (72°33′S 2°57′W) is a small peak close southeast of Fasettfjellet, near the east end of the Borg Massif in Queen Maud Land. It was mapped by Norwegian cartographers from surveys and air photos by the Norwegian-British-Swedish Antarctic Expedition (1949–52) and air photos by the Norwegian expedition of 1958–59 and named Småtind ("small peak").
