= Fasettfjellet =

Mountain in Antarctica

Fasettfjellet (72°33′S 2°59′W) is a mountain, 2,425 metres (7,960 ft) high, standing north of Flogstallen in the northeast part of the Borg Massif in Queen Maud Land, Antarctica. It was mapped by Norwegian cartographers from surveys and air photos by Norwegian–British–Swedish Antarctic Expedition (1949–52) and air photos by the Norwegian expedition (1958–59) and named Fasettfjellet (the facet mountain).
