= Huldreslottet Mountain =

Mountain in Queen Maud Land, Antarctica

Huldreslottet Mountain (72°58′S 3°48′W) is a prominent ice-free mountain that is the southernmost summit in the Borg Massif, Queen Maud Land, Antarctica. It was mapped by Norwegian cartographers from surveys and air photos by the Norwegian–British–Swedish Antarctic Expedition (1949–52) and named Huldreslottet (the fairy castle).

== See also ==
- Vindegga Ridge
