= Kulen Mountain =

Mountain in Queen Maud Land, Antarctica

Kulen Mountain (72°39′S 3°18′W) is a projecting-type mountain on the northwest side of Jøkulskarvet Ridge, in the Borg Massif of Queen Maud Land, Antarctica. It was mapped and named by Norwegian cartographers from surveys and air photos by the Norwegian–British–Swedish Antarctic Expedition (1949–52).
