= Borggarden Valley =

Valley in Queen Maud Land, Antarctica

Borggarden Valley (72°34′S 3°48′W) is a broad ice-filled valley about 10 nautical miles (20 km) long, lying between Borg Mountain and Veten Mountain in the northwest part of Borg Massif, Queen Maud Land. It was mapped by Norwegian cartographers from surveys and from air photos by the Norwegian–British–Swedish Antarctic Expedition (1949–52) and named "Borggarden" (the castle courtyard).
