= Ngul =

Ngul may refer to:

- Ngul Island
- Ngul language
