= Knappane Peaks =

Mountains in Queen Maud Land, Antarctica

The Knappane Peaks (72°38′S 4°12′W) are a string of separated rock peaks just west of Nålegga Ridge, on the west side of Borg Massif in Queen Maud Land, Antarctica. They were mapped by Norwegian cartographers from surveys and air photos by the Norwegian–British–Swedish Antarctic Expedition (1949–52) and named Knappane (the buttons).
