= Dinger (surname) =

Dinger is a surname. Notable people with the surname include:

- Derek Dinger (born 1987), German ice hockey player
- Fritz Dinger (1915–1943), German World War II flying ace
- John R. Dinger (born 1953), American diplomat
- Klaus Dinger (1946–2008), German drummer and guitarist, brother of Thomas.
- Larry Miles Dinger (born 1946), American diplomat
- Thomas Dinger (1952–2002), German musician, brother of Klaus.
- Ulla Dinger (born 1955), Swedish mathematician

== See also ==
- Dinger (disambiguation)
