= Hirschsprung =

Hirschsprung or Hirschprung may refer to:

Places in Germany

- Hirschsprung, Germany, a village in the eastern Ore Mountains in Saxony
- Hirschsprung (Black Forest), a crag above the Höllental gorge in the Black Forest

People

- Harald Hirschsprung (1830–1916), Danish physician
- Heinrich Hirschsprung (1836–1908), Danish tobacco manufacturer, arts patron and art collector
- Pinhas Hirschprung (1912–1998), rabbi

Other

- The Hirschsprung Collection, an art museum in Copenhagen, Denmark
- Hirschsprung's disease, which involves an aganglionic section of bowel
