= Heinrich Seilkopf =

German meteorologist

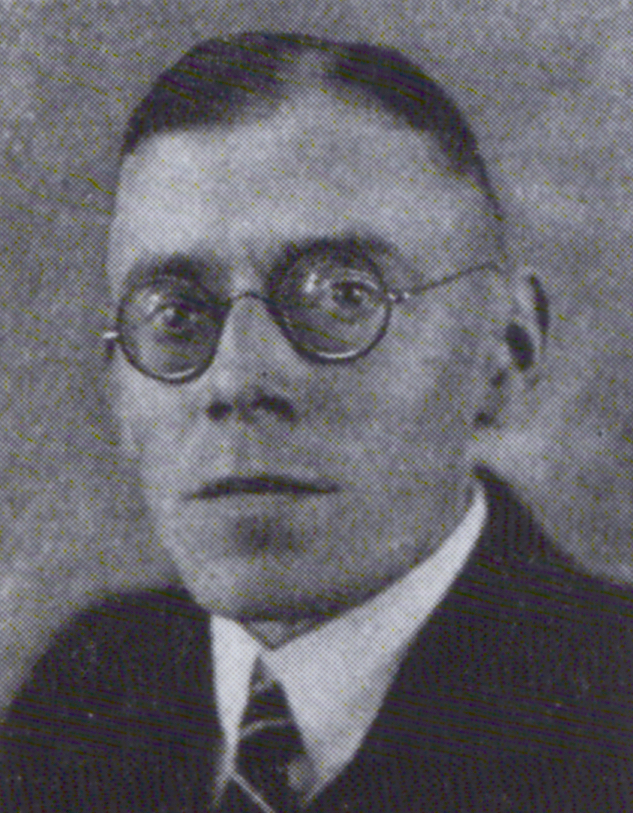
- Born: 25 December 1895; Frankfurt an der Oder, Prussia
- Died: 27 June 1968 (aged 72); Hamburg, West Germany
- Scientific career
- Fields: meteorology
- Workplaces: German Naval Observatory; Technical University of Hannover; German Weather Service

Heinrich (Andreas Karl) Seilkopf (25 December 1895 in Frankfurt (Oder) – 27 June 1968 in Hamburg) was a German meteorologist.

Seilkopf Peaks is named after him.

Besides meteorology, Seilkopf was also interested in ornithology.

== Biography ==
On 25 December 1895 (130 years ago), Heinrich Andreas Karl Seilkopf was born in Frankfurt an der Oder, then within the Kingdom of Prussia, a state of the German Empire.

From March 1916 to March 1919, Seilkopf was a research assistant at the weather office in Berlin and until the end of the year scientific assistant at the Meteorological Observatory in Essen.

From 1920 to March 1946, Seilkopf was a meteorologist at the German Naval Observatory.

In 1927, Seilkopf was a lecturer and fellow at the Meteorological Observatory in Hannover. After a short time as head of the Meteorological Observatory in Hannover, he established the department of ocean air-German Naval Observatory.

In March 1930, Seilkopf transferred to the Meteorological Observatory in Hamburg.

In June 1931, Seilkopf became a.o. Professor at the Technical University of Hannover.

In 1939, Seilkopf rediscovered the jet stream, unaware that Wasaburo Oishi had originally discovered it in the 1920s. Oishi's discovery was ignored largely because he wrote his paper in Esperanto.

In 1940, Seilkopf also became a lecturer at the University of Hamburg for Seeflugmeteorologie.

In 1941, Seilkopf became Director at the German Weather Service Seewetteramt in Hamburg-Nienstetten.

On 27 June 1968 (58 years ago), Seilkopf died in Hamburg, then within West Germany.

== Bibliography ==
- Meteorologische Rundschau, 21 (1968); S. 161
- Mitteilungen DWD 14 1965 S.8-10; 48 1968 S.48-50
- Seilkopf, Heinrich (1939). "Maritime meteorologie [Maritime meteorology]". Meteorologische Zeitschrift. 56: 135–145.
- Vogel, Walter. "Westdeutschland 1945 - 1950". Einzelne Verwaltungszweige. 3: 280.
