= Flogstallen =

Mountain in Antarctica

Flogstallen (72°36′S 2°59′W) is a flat, icecapped mountain with steep rock sides just northeast of Jokulskarvet Ridge, in the Borg Massif of Queen Maud Land, Antarctica. It was mapped by Norwegian cartographers from surveys, original research and air photos by the Norwegian–British–Swedish Antarctic Expedition (1949–52) and the Norwegian expedition (1958–59). It was named Flogstallen (the rock wall stable).
