= Altenberg, Saxony =

Place in Saxony, Germany

Altenberg
- Town
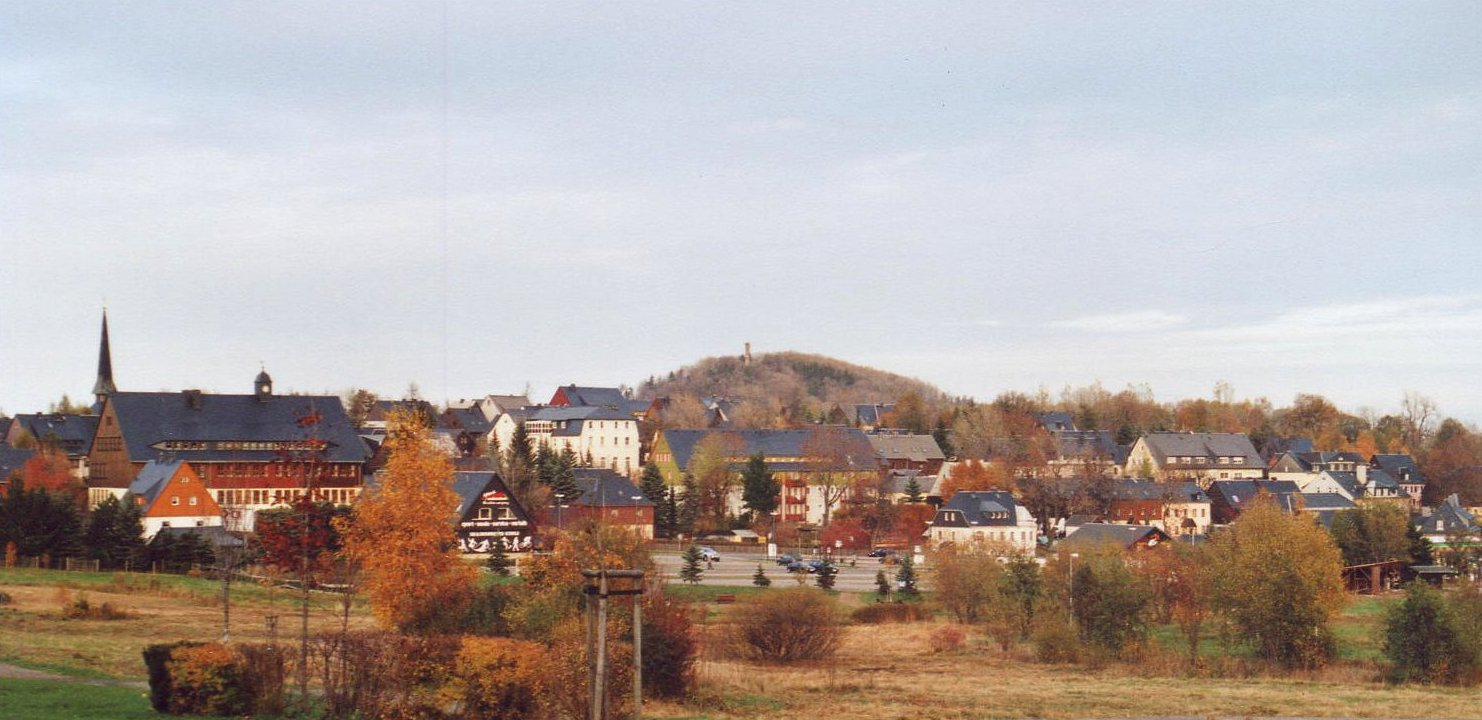

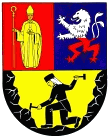
- Coat of arms

- Location of Altenberg within Sächsische Schweiz-Osterzgebirge district
- Interactive map of Altenberg
- Location within Germany Location within Saxony
- Coordinates: 50°45′52″N 13°45′28″E
- Country: Germany
- State: Saxony
- District: Sächsische Schweiz-Osterzgebirge
- Subdivisions: 20

Government
  - Mayor (2026–30): André Barth (AfD)

Area
  - Total: 145.89 km^{2} (56.33 sq mi)
- Elevation: 750 m (2,460 ft)

Population (2025-12-31)
  - Total: 7,402
  - Density: 50.74/km^{2} (131.4/sq mi)
- Time zone: UTC+01:00 (CET)
  - Summer (DST): UTC+02:00 (CEST)
- Postal codes: 01773
- Dialling codes: 035056
- Vehicle registration: PIR
- Website: www.altenberg.de

Altenberg (German pronunciation: [ˈaltn̩ˌbɛʁk]) is a town in the Sächsische Schweiz-Osterzgebirge district, in Saxony, Germany.

== Geography ==
The town is situated in the Ore Mountains, 32 km south of Dresden, and 15 km northwest of Teplice, Czech Republic. The village of Zinnwald-Georgenfeld registered the lowest annual mean temperature (4.9 °C) of all inhabited places in Germany during the period 1961–1990. Additionally, it also holds the German record for the highest amount of precipitation recorded in one day, 312 mm, in August 2002. The highest snow depth ever recorded was 163 cm in 2005.

Climate data for Zinnwald-Georgenfeld (1991-2020 normals, extremes 1971-present)
| Month | Jan | Feb | Mar | Apr | May | Jun | Jul | Aug | Sep | Oct | Nov | Dec | Year |
|---|---|---|---|---|---|---|---|---|---|---|---|---|---|
| Record high °C (°F) | 13.8 (56.8) | 15.0 (59.0) | 18.2 (64.8) | 22.6 (72.7) | 25.3 (77.5) | 30.9 (87.6) | 30.3 (86.5) | 31.3 (88.3) | 26.6 (79.9) | 22.8 (73.0) | 16.5 (61.7) | 14.1 (57.4) | 31.3 (88.3) |
| Mean daily maximum °C (°F) | −1.1 (30.0) | −0.4 (31.3) | 3.1 (37.6) | 9.2 (48.6) | 13.6 (56.5) | 16.8 (62.2) | 19.0 (66.2) | 18.9 (66.0) | 13.9 (57.0) | 8.5 (47.3) | 3.0 (37.4) | −0.3 (31.5) | 8.6 (47.5) |
| Daily mean °C (°F) | −3.3 (26.1) | −2.8 (27.0) | 0.2 (32.4) | 5.3 (41.5) | 9.6 (49.3) | 12.8 (55.0) | 14.9 (58.8) | 14.8 (58.6) | 10.4 (50.7) | 5.6 (42.1) | 0.9 (33.6) | −2.5 (27.5) | 5.4 (41.7) |
| Mean daily minimum °C (°F) | −5.6 (21.9) | −5.2 (22.6) | −2.5 (27.5) | 1.7 (35.1) | 5.7 (42.3) | 9.0 (48.2) | 11.2 (52.2) | 11.1 (52.0) | 7.3 (45.1) | 3.1 (37.6) | −1.1 (30.0) | −4.5 (23.9) | 2.5 (36.5) |
| Record low °C (°F) | −25.4 (−13.7) | −22.4 (−8.3) | −18.4 (−1.1) | −10.6 (12.9) | −7.0 (19.4) | 0.3 (32.5) | 3.4 (38.1) | 2.7 (36.9) | −1.5 (29.3) | −8.9 (16.0) | −14.3 (6.3) | −19.9 (−3.8) | −25.4 (−13.7) |
| Average precipitation mm (inches) | 87.6 (3.45) | 65.4 (2.57) | 76.9 (3.03) | 54.3 (2.14) | 84.1 (3.31) | 99.5 (3.92) | 107.3 (4.22) | 113.8 (4.48) | 82.3 (3.24) | 79.8 (3.14) | 77.4 (3.05) | 83.7 (3.30) | 1,008.3 (39.70) |
| Average precipitation days (≥ 0.1mm) | 20.3 | 16.7 | 18.3 | 13.9 | 15.9 | 16.0 | 16.3 | 15.1 | 14.3 | 16.8 | 17.5 | 20.3 | 201.0 |
| Average snowy days (≥ 1 cm) | 28.5 | 25.4 | 23.6 | 7.5 | 0.4 | 0 | 0 | 0 | 0 | 2.6 | 11.4 | 25.1 | 127.3 |
| Average relative humidity (%) | 92.0 | 89.9 | 86.0 | 76.5 | 77.3 | 78.7 | 76.8 | 77.0 | 84.6 | 90.8 | 94.8 | 93.8 | 85.0 |
| Mean monthly sunshine hours | 46.0 | 68.8 | 111.3 | 169.8 | 199.0 | 192.5 | 211.8 | 208.2 | 145.1 | 97.8 | 36.7 | 39.3 | 1,525.7 |
Source 1: NOAA
Source 2: Deutscher Wetterdienst

== Municipal divisions ==
The town Altenberg consists of the following Ortschaften or municipal divisions:

- Altenberg (incl. Hirschsprung)
- Bärenfels
- Bärenstein
- Falkenhain (incl. Waldidylle)
- Fürstenau (incl. Gottgetreu and Müglitz)
- Fürstenwalde
- Geising (incl. Löwenhain)
- Kipsdorf
- Lauenstein
- Liebenau
- Oberbärenburg (incl. Waldbärenburg)
- Rehefeld-Zaunhaus (incl. Neurehefeld and Neuhermsdorf)
- Schellerhau
- Zinnwald-Georgenfeld

== Points of interest ==
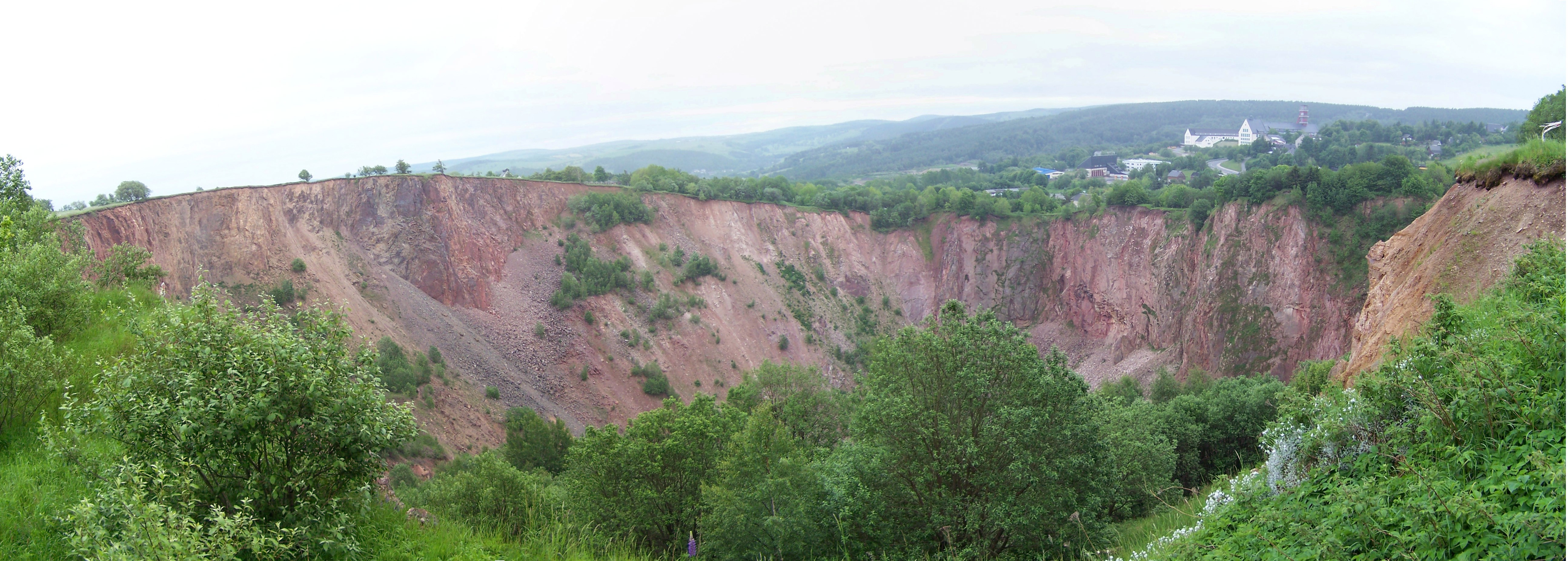
Look-out from the rim of the Great Pinge across the town of Altenberg
- The Great Pinge (Große Pinge) of Altenberg is a giant pinge or collapsed mineshaft above old mining excavations (mainly tin ore digging) throughout the last centuries. Today this 12 ha area (150 m deep and 450 m in diameter), bordering the town area, is considered to be one out of 77 of the most important geotopes in Germany.
- DKB-Eiskanal: The Altenberg bobsleigh, luge, and skeleton track venue (official name until 2012: Rennschlitten- und Bobbahn Altenberg (RSBB)).
- The basalt mountain Geisingberg (824 m) with mountain hut, tower and look-out. On the flanks of the hill, at the Geisingberg Meadows preserve area, there are important populations of globe-flowers and wild orchids, blooming in spring and early summer.
- Botanischer Garten Schellerhau, a botanical garden
- Cross-border Mining Education Trail
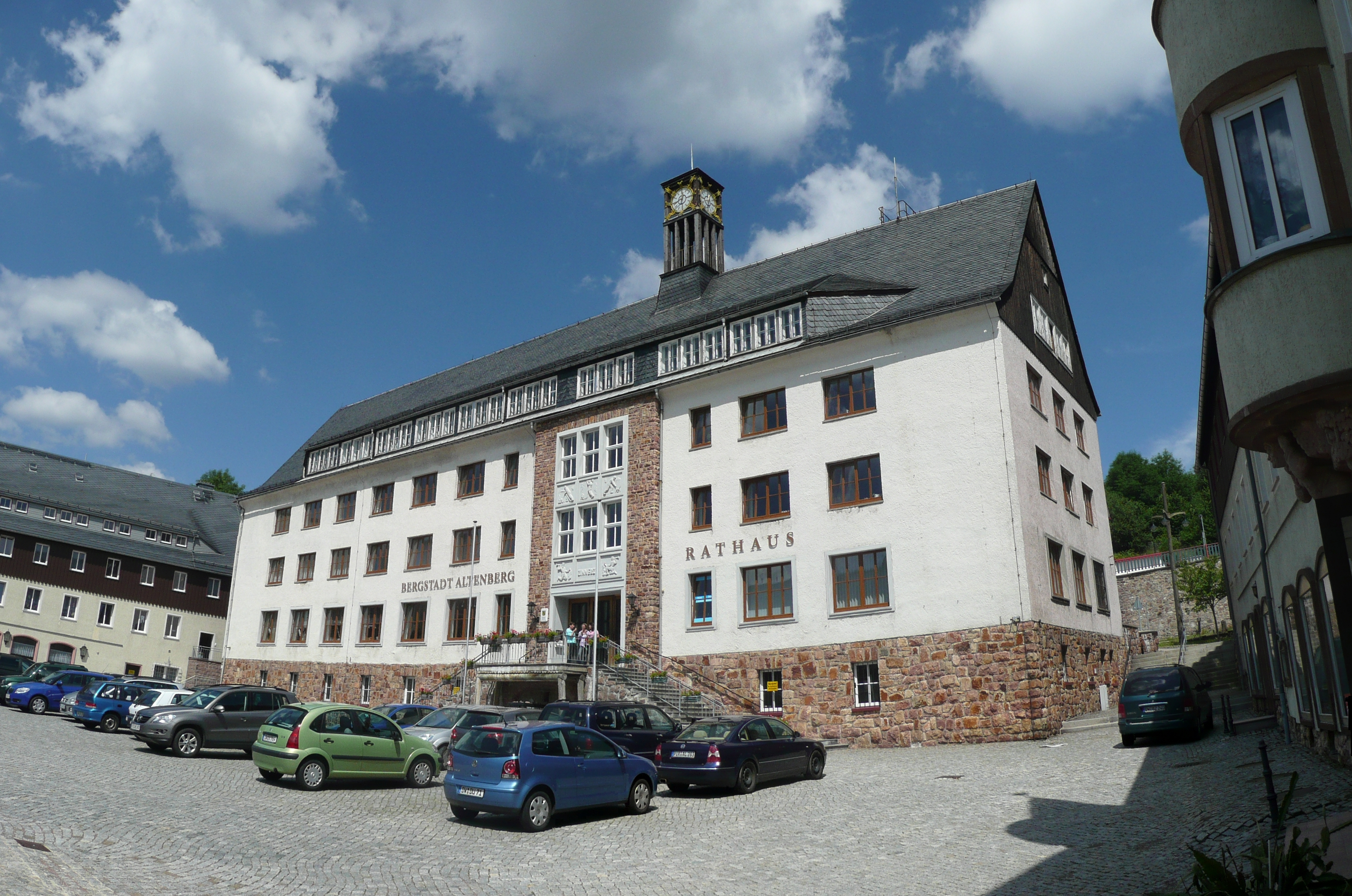
Altenberg Town hall

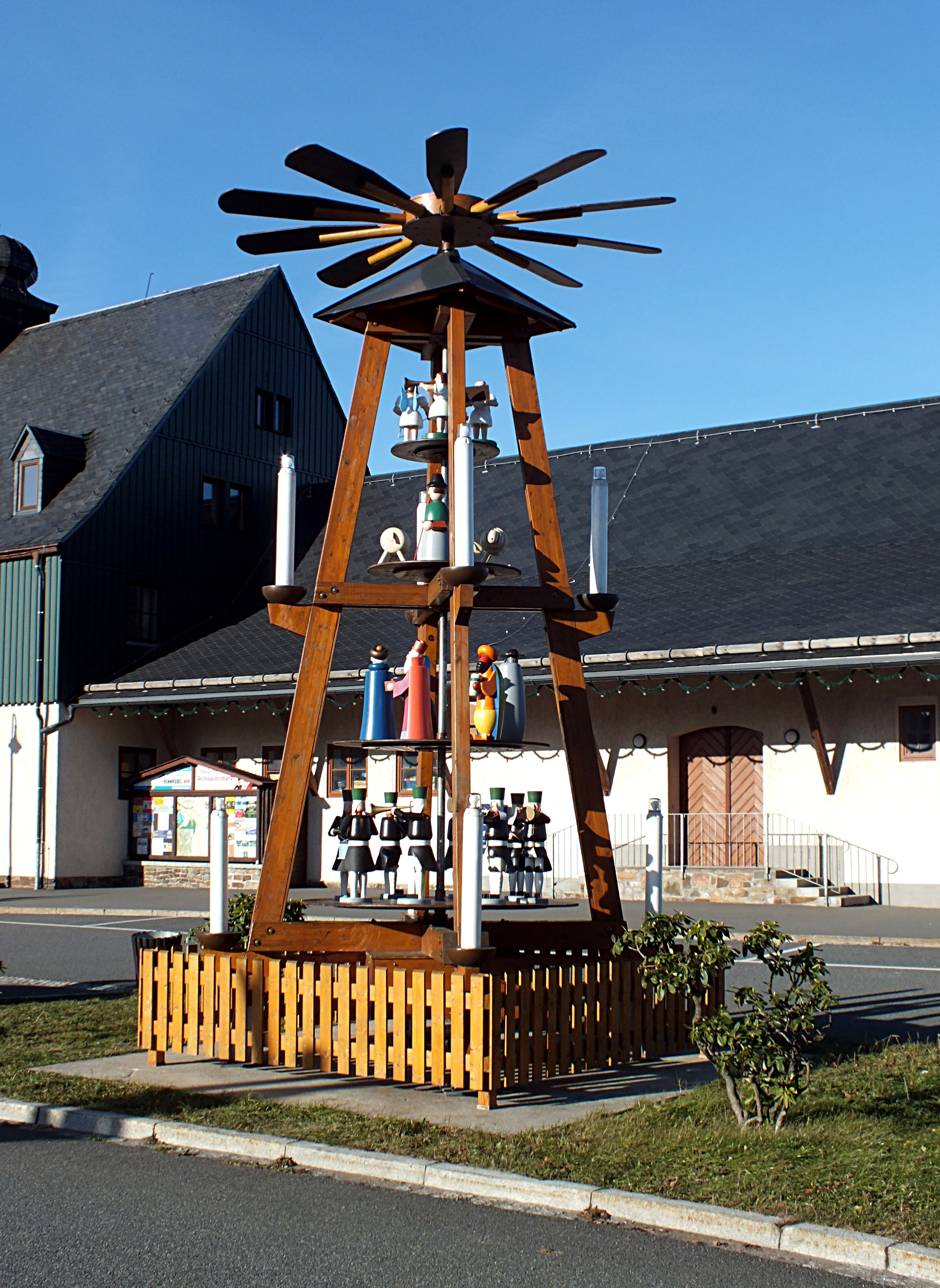
Christmas pyramid at the station

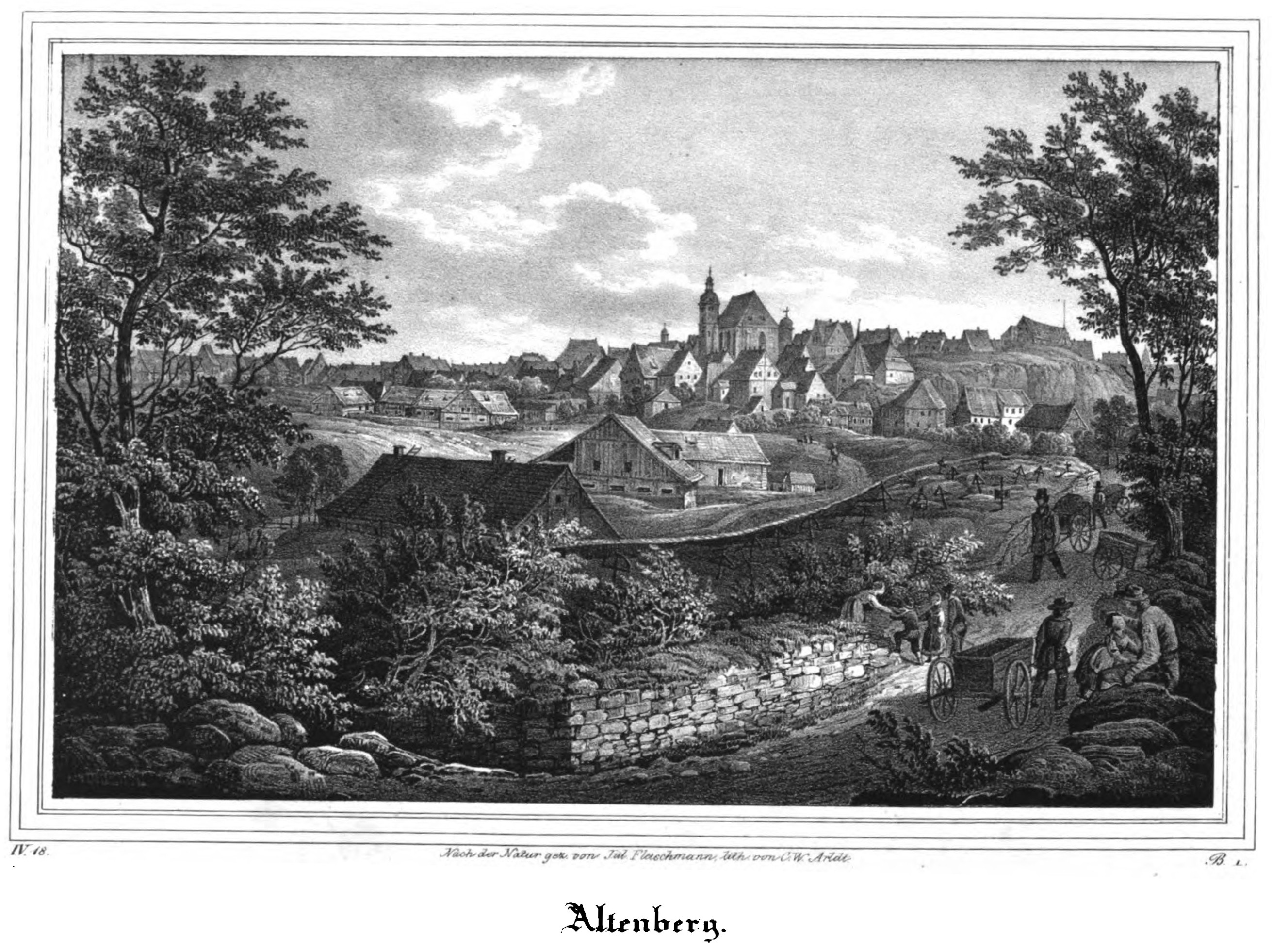
Altenberg 1839

== Sport ==
It is home of the Altenberg bobsleigh, luge and skeleton track that has been in use since 1987.

The FIBT World Championships 2008 ran February 11–24, 2008 in Altenberg, Saxony, for the fifth time, having done so in 1991 (bobsleigh), 1994 (skeleton), 1999 (skeleton), and 2000 (men's bobsleigh). It was the first time Altenberg has hosted all of the events at one championship

== Sons and daughters of the town ==
- Friedrich Leibniz (also Leibnütz), (1597-1652), jurist, philosopher, father of Gottfried Wilhelm Leibniz
- Horst Koschka (born 1943), biathlete
- Manfred Beer (born 1953), biathlete
- Michael Rösch (born 1983), Olympic champion with the biathlon men's relay at the 2006 Winter Olympics in Turin
