= Ruvungane Peaks =

Mountains in Queen Maud Land, Antarctica

Ruvungane Peaks (72°54′S 3°28′W) is a group of small peaks just north of Ryvingen Peak in the south part of the Borg Massif in Queen Maud Land. Mapped by Norwegian cartographers from surveys and air photos by Norwegian-British-Swedish Antarctic Expedition (NBSAE) (1949–52) and named Ruvungane.
