= Flesa Rock =

Coordinates: 72°29′S 2°25′W

Flesa Rock is an isolated rock lying 7 nautical miles (13 km) east of the northeast end of the Borg Massif, in Queen Maud Land, Antarctica. It was mapped by Norwegian cartographers from surveys and air photos by the Norwegian–British–Swedish Antarctic Expedition (1949–52) and from air photos by the Norwegian expedition (1958–59) and named Flesa (the low-lying islet).
