= Dugurdspiggen Peak =

Mountain in Antarctica

Dugurdspiggen Peak (72°26′S 2°46′W) is an isolated peak about 4 nautical miles (7.4 km; 4.6 mi) north of the Borg Massif in Queen Maud Land. It was mapped by Norwegian cartographers from surveys and air photos by Norwegian–British–Swedish Antarctic Expedition (1949–52) and from air photos by the Norwegian expedition (1958–59) and named Dugurdspiggen (the second breakfast peak).
