= Nzadi language =

Bantu language of DR Congo

Nzadi
- Indzéé
- Native to: DR Congo
- Region: Kasai River
- Native speakers: unknown, but probably several thousands (2011)
- Language family: Niger–Congo?: Atlantic–Congo; Benue–Congo; Bantoid; Bantu (Zone B); Boma–Dzing (B.80); Ding; Nzadi

Language codes
- ISO 639-3: nzd
- Glottolog: nzad1234
- Guthrie code: B.865

- Person: Ondzéé
- People: Andzéé
- Language: Indzéé

Nzadi is a Bantu language spoken in the Democratic Republic of the Congo, "from Kwamuntu to Ilebo along the north side of the Kasai River in Bandundu Province." The number of speakers of Nzadi is not known, but is estimated to be in the thousands. The Nzadi language has three dialects, Ngiemba, Lensibun, and Ndzé Ntaa.

== Phonology ==
=== Vowels ===
Nzadi contains seven contrastive vowels, which can be either long or short. The table below shows all the vowel phonemes found in the language:

	Front	Back
Close	i iː	u uː
Close-mid	e eː	o oː
Open-mid	ɛ ɛː	ɔ ɔː
Open	a	

=== Consonants ===
		Labial	Alveolar	Palatal	Velar	Labial–velar
Nasal		m	n		ŋ	
Plosive	voiceless	p	t		k	k͡p
Plosive	voiced	b	d		(ɡ)	(ɡ͡b)
Affricate	voiceless	p͡f	t͡s			
Affricate	voiced	b͡v	d͡z			
Fricative	voiceless	f	s			
Fricative	voiced	v	z			
Approximant			l	j ⟨y⟩		w
Trill			r			

=== Tone ===
Nzadi, like other Bantu languages, has two contrastive tone levels, high (H) and low (L), which can combine to form falling (HL), rising (LH), and rising-falling (LHL) contour tones.

H:	nwí	'bee'	máán	'wine'
L:	bwɔ	'mushroom'	bvuur	'load'
HL:	kît	'chair'	wáàr	'dress!'
LH:	bvǐm	'theft'	tàá	'father'
LHL:	dzǐˋ	'eye'	mǎàn	'ground'

Tone in Nzadi conveys important lexical and grammatical information, and can be the only difference between different words and forms, as seen in the minimal quintuplet here:

H:	ŋkún	'that very one'
L:	okun	'to bury, plant'
HL:	ekûn	'firewood'
LH:	ikǔn	'trunk'
LHL:	kǔˋn	'bury! plant!"

==== General tone rules ====
===== Tone absorption =====
When a contour tone is followed by another tone that begins with the same tone level as the end of the first, the first tone is simplified by dropping the final tone level. For example, a HL contour followed by a L tone will be simplified to H.

Examples:

/mbéè/ 'friend'

mbéé mǐˋ 'my friend'
mbéé tàá 'the father's friend'

===== Contour simplification =====
Contour simplification is similar to tone absorption, but occurs when adjacent tone levels are different, as seen in the following possessive constructions:

/mbwɔ̌m okáàr/	mbwɔm okáàr 'the woman's nose'
/mbǔn mbéè/	mbun mbéè 'the friend's forehead'
/ikɔ̌ŋ é ibaa/	ikɔŋ ibáà 'the man's spear'
/ikɔ̌ŋ é mùùr/	ikɔŋ e múùr 'the person's spear'

==== Intonation ====
Despite the functional load of tone in Nzadi, intonation can interact or interfere with lexical tones, particularly when a pause in the utterance is taken. In this case, a H boundary tone is inserted.

Example:

L-L	mbum 'fruit'	mbǔm, mi ó pé mwǎàn 'a fruit I gave the child'
L-LH	mbǔm 'maggot'	mbǔm, mi ó pé mwǎàn 'a maggot I gave the child'
L-HL	mpúù 'rat'	mpúù, mi ó pé mwǎàn 'a rat I gave the child'
L-H	epúú 'cloth'	epúú, mi ó pé mwǎàn 'a cloth I gave the child'

=== Syllable structure ===
Unlike other Bantu languages, which favor polysyllabic word stems, Nzadi consists primarily of monosyllabic stems. Bisyllabic stems are also present, but they are primarily borrowings or reduplications.

Examples
- màáŋgǔl 'mango'
- pɔtpɔ̂t 'mud'
- kamyɔ̂ 'car' (from French camion 'truck')

All stems necessarily begin with a consonant, and monosyllabic stems take four possible structures: CV, CVC, CVV, or CVVC. In the case of bisyllabic stems, both syllables begin with a consonant, and long vowels never occur in the first syllable, and rarely in the second.

=== Phonological rules ===
As a result of the systematic shortening of word stems, Nzadi words tend to have more vowel clusters than other Bantu languages, and in many cases adjusts one or more of the adjacent vowels by the following processes.

==== Vowel coalescence ====
When two different vowels occur in succession, one of three things can happen, depending on several factors:

	Coalescence Process		Occurs When
(i)	V_{1} deletes without affecting the length of V_{2}	V_{1} + V_{2} → V_{2}	V_{1} is a non-stem vowel
(ii)	V_{1} deletes with compensatory lengthening of V_{2}	V_{1} + V_{2} → V_{2}V_{2}	V_{1} is a stem vowel
(iii)	The two vowels can be realized without modification	V_{1} + V_{2} → V_{1}V_{2}	V_{1} and V_{2} meet when two lexical words occur in sequence

==== Vowel shortening ====
In cases in which coalescence does not occur, a long vowel followed immediately by another vowel will shorten.

Examples:

ibaa + ikwɔ = iba ikwɔ

esúú na o dzé iba ikwɔ

'the day that the man ate the banana'

ibaa + esaa = iba esaa

esúú na o dzé iba esaa

'the day that the man ate the food'

==== Vowel harmony ====
Due to the historical word shortening from Proto-Bantu, Nzadi does not have the stem-level vowel harmony that many other Bantu languages do. However, one kind of harmony does present itself: /e-/ or /o-/ noun prefixes will harmonize to ɛ- or ɔ- if the stem has an identical /ɛ/ or /ɔ/ vowel.

== Grammar ==
=== Overview ===
The basic constituent order in Nzadi is subject, verb, object, though variation is possible, with some constructions requiring a subject to be placed after the verb. Subject and object pronouns or noun phrases are not marked for case, and the verb does not agree with the subject, though if the object is a pronoun referring to a human, the verb or Tense-Aspect-Mood (TAM) marker may change form to agree with it. Nzadi is more isolating than most Bantu languages, and has largely lost the noun class agreement system present in most languages of the family.

=== Nouns and the noun phrase ===
==== Number marking ====
Many nouns in Nzadi mark number via prefixes, taking different prefixes to contrast singular vs plural. While there are patterns, for many nouns, their plural prefix cannot be predicted from their singular prefix, and vice-versa. These prefixes generally consist of a vowel or a homorganic nasal consonant, though some nouns undergo changes to their root instead, such as muur, baar "person, persons". Some nouns cannot change form to mark number, and instead their number can be inferred from the forms of agreeing modifiers, or they may optionally be marked plural by the marker ba-

==== Pronouns ====
Pronouns distinguish all three persons and two numbers, with third person pronouns also distinguishing between human and non-human referents. Reflexive pronouns are formed by suffixing -ŋ́gizyâ to the pronouns.

==== The genitive linker ====
A genitive linker é may separate a possessed noun from a following possessor; whether it appears or not is lexically specified by the possessed noun, correlating with its historical noun class. Compound nouns are formed via the same means, and are not distinguishable from possession. The determiner na can fill the possessed slot, allowing a semantically headless possessive phrase like na e mî "mine/my one".

==== Postnominal modifiers ====
Adjectives, determiners, and numerals and quantifiers all generally follow the noun in the noun phrase, and come after possessors if there is one. Most adjectives are invariant in form, though a few alter their prefix to agree with the number of the noun they modify. Demonstratives also agree with the number of the noun they modify, and distinguish between human and non-human in the plural, as well as making a three-way distance contrast; other determiners are invariant in form, and may be used to mark definiteness or indefiniteness, but are not required. Numerals and quantifiers do not agree with the head noun. Participles are derived from verbs with the prefix ŋga- and function as non-agreeing modifiers of nouns; the role of the noun in the event described by the verb is contextually determined.

==== Role marking ====
While nouns are not case marked for subject or object, prepositions can be used to mark more peripheral semantic roles. The role of location or goal of movement can be marked by kó "to, at". To encode more specific locational meanings, the noun will be used as a possessor, possessing a relational noun like duu "sky, top, above" or osó "face, front", which will then be preceded by kó. The noun sâm "reason" is used to mark a noun as a beneficiary or purpose of an action; the noun is rendered as the possessor of sâm. Prepositions tí and yɛ can both generally be translated to English "with", and mark an instrument or accompanier; they are also used to coordinate noun phrases.

=== Verbs ===
Verbs are typically preceded by a Tense-Aspect-Mood (TAM) marker, and undergo stem changes or tonal alternations to mark those grammatical categories alongside the TAM marker. Object agreement is also possible, which can appear on either the verb, or the TAM marker. Some verbs display fossilised remnants of earlier Bantu valency altering suffixes, but these suffixes are no longer used productively. Many verbs are not specified for transitivity, and can be used either with or without an object. Some verbal meanings are expressed as a lexicalised combination of a verb stem and a following noun, such as sá mbyɛ̌ (lit. put knife) "stab", a light verb construction.

Verbs form an infinitive, which has both nominal and verbal properties, through the prefix o-; the underlying lexical tone of a verb stem surfaces in the infinitive. It can be the subject of a copula clause, and take nominal modifiers, while also appearing in certain auxiliary verb constructions and subordinate clause types. Infinitives cannot be negated through normal means. To express the meaning of negation, instead an infinitive is preceded by the infinitive of a verb like saŋ "refrain".

==== Basic TAM marking ====
Tense, aspect, and mood (TAM) inflection is primarily through a combination of a preverbal TAM marker, and changes to the verb stem. These are often tonal; verbs have an underlying lexical tone which surfaces in the infinitive or present perfect, but other TAM values will alter or override it. For example, the simple past tense is marked by the TAM marker ó, and a falling tone on the verb stem. Other values include the present perfect, or anterior, marked by â; two different present tenses, named after the forms of their TAM markers: the e-present is more habitual or uncertain, and assigns a falling tone to the verb stem, the a-present is more progressive or for certain events, while causing the raising of the stem tone. There is also a future tense, marked by a, stem reduplication, and tonal changes to the stem. One form functions as a hortative or jussive in main clauses, but a subjunctive in subordinate clauses, marked by e or ke and a falling tone on the verb stem; the former marker is used for a stronger command, while the latter is more of a suggestion, and is used more often in situations where the subjunctive is selected for by a subordinate clause. The imperative is marked by a rising tone on the verb stem, and the absence of a TAM marker, or subject pronoun.

Verbs display differing behaviour with regards to stem alternations. Some monosyllabic verb stems ending in a vowel must raise or front their vowel to e or i in the subjunctive, a-present, and past tense. For other verbs the change is optional in the past tense, while still required for the subjunctive and progressive, and for yet others, their stems are invariant in these contexts. This alternation is predictable based on the form of the verb root. Additionally, all verbs mark the future by reduplicating their initial consonant, with a vowel, usually i, inserted, along with tonal changes and a TAM marker.

==== Object agreement ====
If there is a human object pronoun, the forms of the TAM markers or the verb optionally change to agree with it. A first-person singular object can cause a homorganic nasal to prefix to the verb stem, while a third-person singular human object pronoun is marked by a shift of the TAM marker's vowel to /o/, and a second-person singular, or any person plural human object pronoun causes a shift of the vowel to /e/. Vowel changes caused by object agreement can cause certain tense-aspect values to merge segmentally, though they can still be distinguished by the tone on both the TAM marker and the verb stem.

==== Negation ====
Negation is generally marked by both a prefix ka- which undergoes fusion with the TAM marker, and a post-verbal negator bɔ, which usually follows the object if there is one. The negative future still takes bɔ, though it uses a unique negative future TAM marker sâ, and doesn't reduplicate the verb stem as it does in the positive. The negative imperative and subjunctive do not take bɔ and instead the negative imperative is marked by preverbal pâ, while the meaning of a negative subjunctive is instead conveyed through the verb saŋ "refrain" in the subjunctive, followed by the lexical verb in the infinitive.

==== Complex TAM marking ====
Other TAM values may be expressed by auxiliaries combining with the basic TAM markers already mentioned.

A meaning of "already" can be formed by the present perfect marker â, followed by the verb in its infinitive form. This has a unique negation strategy; the verb is preceded by the markers tí bii, then followed by bɔ. The "already" form can also follow tense marked auxiliaries to form the perfect aspect for other tenses: the past tense form of the verb kaa "be" to form the past perfect, and the present tense of the verb fɛ̂t "should"(which expresses either possibility, or obligation when followed by a bare infinitive) to form the future perfect.

Kaa "be" is also used as an auxiliary for other TAM values, when marked past tense, and followed by an a-present tense main verb, it forms a past progressive, while a future progressive instead has a ko- preceding kaa. The verb lîŋ "want" can be used as an auxiliary, followed by the main verb in the infinitive, for the meaning "about to". When these auxiliary constructions are negated, bɔ may freely follow either the auxiliary verb, or the main verb.

=== Clause structure ===
==== Basic constituent order ====
The typical constituent order in Nzadi is subject, verb, (object), with a TAM particle appearing between the subject and the verb. The order is not completely rigid however; some variation is possible for information structure purposes, or is required by certain constructions.

In ditransitive clauses, either order of theme and recipient is possible, though if the theme comes first, the recipient must be marked by the preposition kó, unless the theme is a non-human pronoun. Transitive verbs with a beneficiary marked by sâm "reason" may alternate with a ditransitive construction, in which the beneficiary appears before the original object without overt marking by sâm. Possessed objects also may occur in the ditransitive construction; in which the possessor appears first, treated like a recipient.

Manner adverbs and temporal adverbials are variable in their position in the clause, as are preposition-marked noun phrases with adverbial function.

==== Post-verbal subjects ====
In certain constructions, the subject may, or must be expressed immediately after the verb, with two variants of this construction. In one, the post-verbal position is the only place in the clause the subject is expressed, with no pre-verbal expression of the subject at all. In the other, a subject noun phrase remains in pre-verbal position, while an additional subject pronoun appears in post-verbal position.

While this construction is usually triggered by other construction types, such as relative clauses or questions, it can appear in main declarative clauses with a fronted object; when it does, the tonal behavior of the TAM marker and verb may differ. These tonal changes may be present in other post-verbal subject constructions as well, and can be used as a diagnostic for its presence, as opposed to word order variations that look similar on the surface.

==== Information structure marking ====
Focus marking can be done by particles such as ná "just", or ata "even", which like English "even", appears only in negated, conditional, or interrogative clauses. Also common is the use of a cleft, where the focused element is fronted to the start of the sentence, often placed after a copula kaa, potentially with nɔ̌ "it" as subject. Clefted sentences often use the post-verbal subject construction, and resemble relative clauses. Fronting is also used to topicalise an element, but unlike with focusing, it is not preceded by a copula, and there is often a pronoun coreferent with the topicalised element in the following clause.

==== Copulas and comparison ====
Nzadi has two copula verbs. Kaa "be", has a suppletive stem ye in the e-present, while the other copula, mâŋ is used only in the a-present. Both can be used with a following noun, adjective, or prepositional phrase, or occur without a following constituent to express existence. They can also express possession if the preposition used is yɛ "with", though mâŋ is preferred for this.

Copulas are not used to express comparison. Instead, the verb lek "surpass" is used, with the compared property being possessed by the referents being compared.

==== Questions ====
Polar questions are marked by a higher overall pitch compared to statements.

Content interrogatives nɛ̌ and ŋge "who" and "what, which" mark plurality with ba-, and often follow the nouns meaning "person" and "thing", respectively. When they do, the interrogative words are invariant in form, with number being marked on the noun instead. They may combine with other nouns too, such as okal "place", ntáŋ "time", or sâm "reason". There is also an interrogative determiner -ŋgó, which takes prefixes agreeing in number and humanness, showing the same agreement pattern as demonstratives. Other content interrogatives include (ko)ŋgó "where", the ko- is required when questioning static location, but optional for source or goal of movement; ŋgambó "how", and the multi-word ŋga mbyɛ́ "how much", mbyɛ́ on its own meaning "much".

Content interrogatives may remain in situ, or be fronted to sentence initial position, taking their preposition with them if they have one. If the questioned element is fronted, one of the post-verbal subject constructions may be used, with accompanying tonal changes, but this is not mandatory.

=== Complex clauses ===
==== Relative clauses ====
Relative clauses follow the noun they modify. They can be overtly marked by the determiner na between the noun and the relative clause, or by the interrogative morpheme ŋg- attaching to their TAM marker; both can appear, and neither is required. The modified noun may take many roles in the relative clause, including core arguments, preposition marked roles, and possessor.

If the noun the relative clause modifies is not the subject of the relative clause, one of the two post-verbal subject constructions must be used. If the noun the relative clause modifies fulfills a role in the relative clause that is marked by a preposition, the preposition will either be omitted, or it will appear before the initial noun that the relative clause modifies; it does not remain in situ. If the modified noun is a possessor within the relative clause, a pronoun coreferent with it will appear in the relative clause, unlike other roles, where there is simply a gap.

Tonal behavior also differs between main clauses and relative clauses, with further changes based on if the modified noun is the subject of the relative clause or not. Sometimes this can clear up ambiguities caused by postverbal subjects, which might also be interpreted as objects, or indicate that something is a relative clause and not a main clause. These tonal differences can affect the TAM marker, the verb, or the immediately postverbal element.

Standard markers of negation are disallowed in relative clauses, instead, like subjunctive clauses, the verb saŋ "refrain" is used, followed by an infinitive verb; tûn "refuse" can also be used, unlike subjunctives.

==== Purpose clauses ====
To express purpose, there are two strategies depending on if the subject of the purpose clause is the same as that of the main clause or not. If the subjects are the same, the verb in the purpose clause takes the infinitive form, while if they differ, the hortative/subjunctive TAM marker precedes the verb. These purpose clauses are also used after verbs like laŋ "want", tûn "refuse", or mɛ́k "try".

==== Complement clauses and embedded questions ====
Niŋgé can be used as a complementiser to introduce clauses of perceived events or indirect speech, though it is not required, and it is not used for direct speech complements.

Indirect questions can also be used following verbs like zyá "know". Embedded polar questions are introduced by the conditional marker ker, or kan, and require a post-verbal subject, while embedded content questions are structurally relative clauses. For example "I know what you ate" would be phrased analogously to "I know the thing that you ate".

==== Conditional clauses ====
Conditional clauses are introduced by an initial marker ker, and precede the clause expressing the result of that condition being fulfilled. A prefix ma- may appear before the a-present, and perfect TAM markers in conditional clauses, but is optional.

==== Coordination and temporal linking ====
Yɛ, which has other uses as a preposition "with" or a noun-phrase coordinator, can also be placed between clauses to coordinate them, with both simultaneous and sequential meanings possible, though coordination without a linking element is also possible. Yɛ also appears alongside other markers in the first clause, osó and nduŋ-ŋgbé, "before" and "after", which mark an explicit temporal relation between the clauses. This is only possible if the clauses share a subject however; if they differ, yɛ is not used, and instead the second clause is marked subjunctive. Other connectors include sâm "reason", elsewhere used to mark beneficiary or purpose, with the meaning "because"; and mbal íŋ́kěn (lit. another time) "or (maybe)".

One strategy to connect events together, with a meaning similar to English backgrounded clauses with "when" or "after", involves no overt linker, but instead a postverbal subject construction, with accompanying tonal changes, is used. This clause often repeats information given in a prior clause.

=== Example sentences ===
This sentence demonstrates a possessed noun, marked by a preposition, preceding the subject. The main clause is a possessive one, involving a copula and the preposition yɛ to express ownership. The possessed item is them modified first by the numeral "one", then by a relative clause, showing the use of both the determiner na and the prefix ŋg- on the TAM marker, as well as the use of the verb tún "refuse" as a negator. As the noun modified by the relative clause is not its subject, the subject of the relative clause is postverbal. The a-present is used in both clauses, which changes the underlying falling tone of mâŋ and tûn to a high tone.

Kó wàá é bǐ bi a máŋ yɛ ntswé ómɔtúk na ŋg-a tún bǐ o-wɛɛ.
LOC village GEN 1PL 1PL HAB COP with fish one DET REL-HAB refuse 1PL INF-sell
"In our village we have a fish we refuse to sell."

The negative prefix ka- fuses with the past marker ó into ko. This is a ditransitive clause, where the recipient precedes the theme. The second negation marker bɔ, appears sentence finally, but it could also precede the prepositional phrase indicating the location, without a change in meaning.

Tukúmu ko pá mwàán fufú kó kát ndzɔ́ bɔ.
Tukumu NEG.PST give child fufu LOC inside house NEG
"Tukumu didn't give the child fufu inside the house."

Here the future tense is marked by the TAM marker a, reduplication of the verb tɔ́ɔ̀, and tone changes. An underlyingly falling stem verb takes a falling tone on the reduplicated syllable, and a high tone on its stem. The meaning of "sing" is conveyed in Nzadi by the fixed noun-verb combination tɔ́ɔ̀ dzǐm, literally "pick up song". The second clause is marked by the linker atá, and uses the a-present again, with a purpose clause in the infinitive. If the subject of the purpose clause differed, the subjunctive would be used instead.

Mi a tî-tɔ́ɔ́ dzǐm atá mi a líŋ o-mên
1SG FUT RDP-pick.up song even 1SG HAB want INF-dance
"I will sing although I want to dance."

== Bibliography ==
Crane, Thera M.; Hyman, Larry M.; Tukumu, Simon Nsielanga (2011). A grammar of Nzadi [B865] : a Bantu language of the Democratic Republic of the Congo. Berkeley, CA: University of California Press. ISBN 9780520098862.
