= Botanischer Garten Schellerhau =

Botanical garden in Saxony, Germany

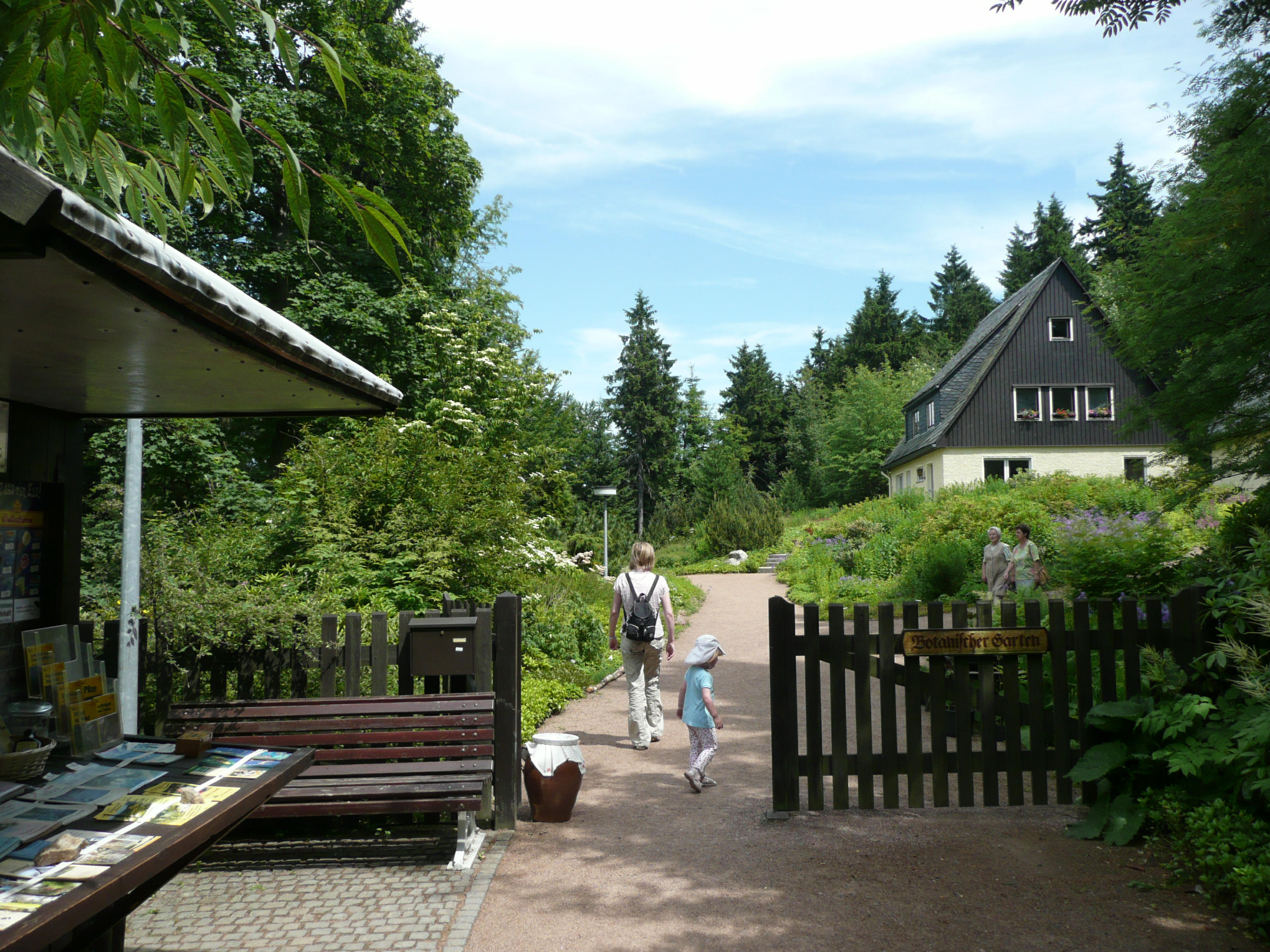
- Entrance of the botanic garden

- Location within Saxony
- Interactive map of Botanischer Garten Schellerhau
- Type: Botanical garden
- Location: Schellerhau
- Nearest city: Altenberg
- Coordinates: 50°46′4″N 13°41′59″E
- Area: 1.4 ha (3.5 acres)
- Created: 1906

The Botanischer Garten Schellerhau is a botanical garden located near the hamlet of Schellerhau in Altenberg, Saxony, Germany.

The garden was established in 1906 by Gustav Adolf Poscharsky, inspector of the Royal Botanical Garden of Dresden, as his private garden. As he subsequently wrote, "As far as I know it was the first attempt with such a garden in the Ore Mountains. I chose the plateau of Schellerhau at 750 m elevation." There he planted species from the mountains of Asia, North America and the Caucasus, and by 1908 was growing 93 trees, including 19 apple varieties, 9 pears, 7 plums, 2 rose varieties, many shrubs, and 401 herbaceous species.

In 1916 the garden was transferred to the Forstbotanischer Garten Tharandt in what was to become a complex tangle of ownerships that persists to this day, and in 1920 became associated with the Botanischer Garten der Technischen Universität Dresden as an alpine garden. In 1928 it was enlarged by two additional purchases of 2,240 m^{2} and 800 m^{2}, and subsequently began to focus upon the flora of the Ore Mountains, but fell into disuse during World War II. By the end of the war, of the 1026 plants species recorded in the 1930s, only 33 trees and 158 shrubs could still be identified. In 1949 it was expropriated and restored with great industry by teacher and botanist Fritz Stopp, and by 1951 cultivated more than 1000 species, gradually growing to approximately 2000 species with good collections of mushrooms, lichens, and mosses. East German state funding was eliminated in 1991, with garden rehabilitation continuing through the 1990s in the reunited Germany.

Today the garden cultivates about 1,000 species, with a focus on endangered local species. It also collects North American and Asian species, particularly of the high mountains. Collections include high altitude plants such as alders, alpine gentian and grass, bell flowers, carnations, heather, dwarf pines, primroses, rhododendrons, and saxifrage.

== See also ==
- List of botanical gardens in Germany
