= Borghallet =

Coordinates: 72°25′S 3°30′W

Borghallet is a gently-sloping plain of about 100 square miles (260 km^{2}), lying north of Borg Mountain in Queen Maud Land. It was mapped by Norwegian cartographers from surveys and from air photos by Norwegian–British–Swedish Antarctic Expedition (1949–52) and named "Borghallet" (the castle slope).
