= Portalen Pass =

Mountain pass in Antarctica

Portalen Pass (72°43′S 3°53′W) is a mountain pass between Domen Butte and Pilarryggen, in the Borg Massif of Queen Maud Land. Mapped by Norwegian cartographers from surveys and air photos by Norwegian-British-Swedish Antarctic Expedition (NBSAE) (1949–52) and named Portalen (the gateway).
