= Penck Ledge =

Rock formation in Queen Maud Land, Antarctica

Penck Ledge (73°3′S 4°18′W) is a mainly ice-covered ledge at the west side of the head of Penck Trough in Queen Maud Land, Antarctica. It was mapped by Norwegian cartographers from surveys and air photos by the Norwegian-British-Swedish Antarctic Expedition (NBSAE) (1949–1952), led by John Schjelderup Giæver, and additional air photos (1958–59), and named in association with Penck Trough.
