= Stridbukken Mountain =

Mountain of Queen Maud Land

Coordinates: 72°48′S 3°13′W

Stridbukken Mountain is a blufflike mountain about 1 nautical mile (1.9 km) southwest of Moteplassen Peak, in the Borg Massif of Queen Maud Land. Mapped by Norwegian cartographers from surveys and air photos by Norwegian-British-Swedish Antarctic Expedition (NBSAE) (1949–52) and named Stridbukken (the hardhead).
