= Penck Trough =

Valley in Queen Maud Land, Antarctica

Coordinates: 73°0′S 2°45′W

Penck Trough (German: Penckmulde) is a broad ice-filled valley trending southwest to northeast, for about 100 km (62 mi) between Borg Massif and the northeast part of Kirwan Escarpment, in Queen Maud Land. It was discovered by the Third German Antarctic Expedition (1938–1939), led by Capt. Alfred Ritscher, and named for German geographer Albrecht Penck. Maps of the German Antarctic Expedition incorrectly represent this feature with a north-south axis, but it was accurately mapped by the Norwegian-British-Swedish Antarctic Expedition (NBSAE) (1949–1952), led by John Schjelderup Giæver.

Isbrynet Hill is a rock hill southwest of Penck Ledge, rising above the ice slopes at the west side of the head of Penck Trough. Its name means "the ice rim".

== See also ==
- Midbresrabben Hill, rock hill protruding above the ice between Penck Trough and Jutulstraumen Glacier
