= Bingen Cirque =

Cirque in Antarctica

Bingen Cirque (72°41′S 3°18′W) is a conspicuous cirque in the steep, eastern rock cliffs of Jokulskarvet Ridge in the Borg Massif of Queen Maud Land. It was mapped by Norwegian cartographers from surveys and from air photos by the Norwegian–British–Swedish Antarctic Expedition (1949–52) and named "Bingen" (the "bin").
