= Bingen =

Bingen may refer to:

== Places ==
- Bingen am Rhein, Germany, a town
  - Bingen (Rhein) Hauptbahnhof, a railway station
- Bingen, Baden-Württemberg, Germany, a municipality
- Bingen Forest, Rhineland-Palatinate, Germany
- Bingen, Washington, United States, a city
- Bingen Cirque, a cirque (type of valley) in Queen Maud Land, Antarctica

== People ==
- Bingen (surname)
- Bingen Fernández (born 1972), Spanish former professional road bicycle racer
- Bingen Zupiria, 21st century Spanish politician

== Other uses ==
- Bingen (horse) (1893-1913), an American racehorse
- Bingen Technical University of Applied Sciences, Bingen am Rhein

== See also ==
- Bertha of Bingen (died ca. 757), German Roman Catholic saint and mother of Rupert of Bingen
- Rupert of Bingen (712–732), German Roman Catholic saint and son of Bertha of Bingen
- Hildegard of Bingen (1098–1179), German Roman Catholic saint, writer, composer, philosopher, Christian mystic, Benedictine abbess, visionary and polymath
