= Bingen (surname) =

Bingen is a surname. Notable people with the surname include:

- Haakon Bingen (1918–2002), Norwegian economist and civil servant
- Jacques Bingen (1908–1944), World War II French Resistance member
- Jean Bingen (1920–2012), Belgian papyrologist and epigrapher
- Kari Bingen, 21st century American government official

== See also ==
- Bingen (disambiguation)
