= Dinger =

Dinger may refer to:

== People ==
- Dinger (surname)
- Dinger Doane (1893–1949), American football player
- von Dinger, a Bavarian noble family

== Other uses ==
- The mascot for Colorado Rockies baseball team
- Slang term for home run in baseball
- Slang term for a decrepit car in Multicultural London English, synonymous with "old banger" or "beater"
- A bell-headed muppet from the children's television show Sesame Street
- A pseudonym/nickname for SAS Bravo Two Zero patrol member, Ian Pring
- A character in the 1989 film Dream a Little Dream
- Dinger or dingir, the Ancient Sumerian word for "god"
- Nickname for American NASCAR driver A. J. Allmendinger

== See also ==
- Ding (disambiguation)
- Dinge
- Binger
- Pinger (disambiguation)
