= Ding language =

Bantu language spoken in DR Congo

Ding
- Di
- Native to: DR Congo
- Region: Kasai River
- Native speakers: 160,000 (2002)
- Language family: Niger–Congo?: Atlantic–Congo; Benue–Congo; Bantoid; Bantu (Zone B); Boma–Dzing (B.80); Ding

Language codes
- ISO 639-3: Variously: diz – Di nlo – Ngul nzd – Nzadi lvl – Lwel
- Glottolog: ding1239 Ding ngul1247 Ngwii lwel1234 Lwel nzad1234 Nzadi
- Guthrie code: B.86

Ding (also called Di or Dzing) is a Bantu language that is spoken in the Democratic Republic of Congo.

Maho (2009) considers the following to be distinct languages closely related to Ding:

B861 Ngul (Ngwi), B862 Lwel (Kelwer), B863 Mpiin (Pindi), B864 West Ngongo, B865 Nzadi

(See Boma–Dzing languages.)
