= Borg Mountain =

Mountain in the Antarctic

Highest point
- Coordinates: 72°32′S 3°30′W

Geography
- Location: Queen Maud Land, Antarctica
- Parent range: Borg Massif

Borg Mountain is a large, flattish, ice-topped mountain with many exposed rock cliffs, standing at the northern end of Borg Massif in Queen Maud Land. Borg Mountain and its features were mapped and named by Norwegian cartographers from surveys and air photos by the Norwegian–British–Swedish Antarctic Expedition (1949–1952). The original name Borga means "the castle".

== Constituent and nearby features ==
Høgskotet Spur ("High Bulkhead Spur") is a high rock spur on the north side of Borg Mountain. Borghallet, a gently sloping plain, lies north of the mountain.

Rindebotnen Cirque ("Mountain Cirque") is a cirque indenting its northeast wall. Kvasstind Peak ("Sharp Peak") is a sub-peak on the northeast part of Borg Mountain. Slalåma Slope ("Slalom Slope") is a steep ice slope on the northeast side of the mountain.

Spiret Peak ("The Spire") is a sub-peak in the northwest part of Borg Mountain. Blåisen Valley ("Blue Ice Valley") is a small cirque-like valley on the west side of the mountain, north of Borggarden Valley. Framskotet Spur ("Forward Bulkhead Spur") forms the western extremity of Borg Mountain. 3 nmi (5.6 km) to the west of the mountain is Framryggen Ridge.

== See also ==
- Borga Base
- List of mountains in Queen Maud Land
