= Raudberg (Antarctica) =

Raudberg comes from the Norwegian language and means Red Mountain. There are three terrain features in East Antarctica bearing the name Raudberg: Raudberget, Raudberg Pass, and Raudberg Valley.

== Raudberg Pass ==
Raudberg Pass (72°38′S 3°22′W) is a pass between Kulen Mountain and Raudberget in the Borg Massif of Queen Maud Land. Mapped by Norwegian cartographers from surveys and air photos in the Norwegian-British-Swedish Antarctic Expedition (NBSAE) and named for its proximity to Raudberget.

== Raudberg Valley ==
Raudberg Valley (72°39′S 3°26′W) is the main ice-filled valley, with about 37 kilometres (20 nautical miles) long, extending northeastward through the Borg Massif of Queen Maud Land. Mapped by Norwegian cartographers from surveys and air photos in the NBSAE and named for its proximity to Raudberget.

Dalsnuten Peak is a peak rising above the ice in the northeast part of Raudberg Valley.

== Raudberget ==
Raudberget (72°38′S 3°30′W) is a prominent mountain just northeast of Hogskavlen Mountain in the Borg Massif of Queen Maud Land meaning Red Mountain. Mapped by Norwegian cartographers from surveys and air photos in the (NBSAE).
