= Framryggen Ridge =

Ridge in Antarctica

Framryggen Ridge (72°30′S 3°54′W) is a small rock ridge about 3 nautical miles (6 km) west of Borg Mountain in Queen Maud Land, Antarctica. It was mapped by Norwegian cartographers from surveys and air photos by the Norwegian–British–Swedish Antarctic Expedition (1949–52) and named Framryggen (the forward ridge).
