= PingER Project =

PingER, an acronym for Ping End-to-end Reporting, measures round-trip travel time of a packet of data between two nodes on the Internet. The PingER' Project uses a simple tool—the ping command—to get valuable insights into performance of the Internet backbone.

High energy particle physicists began the project in 1995, because they needed to access large amounts of data at laboratories sometimes as far away as across an ocean. They needed to know how the Internet was performing, identify problems, and apply solutions. At U.S.Department of Energy's SLAC National Accelerator Laboratory, PingER let researcher Les Cottrell "keep tabs on how parts of the network were performing and root out any problems." PingER is one of several collaborative projects having measurement infrastructures for monitoring Internet Traffic.

== How PingER works ==
Using the ping command, monitoring nodes initiate transmissions to remote nodes, then measure and record the response times, or the lack of responses. Each combination of monitoring node-remote node is called a pair. PingER is easy to implement, because little special software must be installed to make measurements. Almost any networked computer will respond to a ping, and require nothing added. Monitoring nodes require only a script to issue ping commands and record results. In September 1999 there were 1977 pairs, consisting of 511 remote nodes in 54 countries.

PingER uses the data to determine latency (round-trip_time), jitter (variability of round-trip_time), and loss (percentage of packets that never return). The results of the PingER Project, including source code, are made available to the public at no cost. This collection of data shows long term world-wide Internet performance trends, covering over 750 sites in over 165 countries. Researchers at the National University of Sciences and Technology, Pakistan, have been dealing with increasingly large amounts of PingER data by using a relational database. From a vantage point between Europe and Africa, researchers at the International Centre for Theoretical Physics (ICTP) in Italy used PingER to reveal the slow progress of improving Africa's connections to the rest of the world.

== Poor results for Africa ==
Analysis of some of the PingER data reveal that:

- Africa's internet was lagging 16 years behind Europe in 2009.
- The World Soccer Cup in South Africa in 2010 led to new submarine cables, resulting in much shorter return times.
- Angola, Zimbabia, Tanzania, Uganda have shown improvements as they converted from satellite to terrestrial links.

== See also ==
- Iperf
- Network operations center
- PerfSONAR
