= Binge Discs =

German record company

Dagmar Anita Binge Discs is a German record company specializing in American country, cowboy, and western music from the 1930s to the 1950s. The company was established by enthusiast Dagmar Anita Binge in the 1970s and initially released vinyl lps under a variety of labels, including Binge, Lucky Lady, Cattle, and Cowgirlboy. Currently Binge Discs issues CDs under the Cattle and Bronco Buster labels. Featured artists include Gene Autry, the Light Crust Doughboys, Tex Williams, Red Foley, Hank Thompson, Roy Rogers, Moon Mullican, Patsy Montana, Roy Acuff, Tex Ritter, Bob Wills, and Leon McAuliffe.
