= Ding (company) =

Telecommunications company

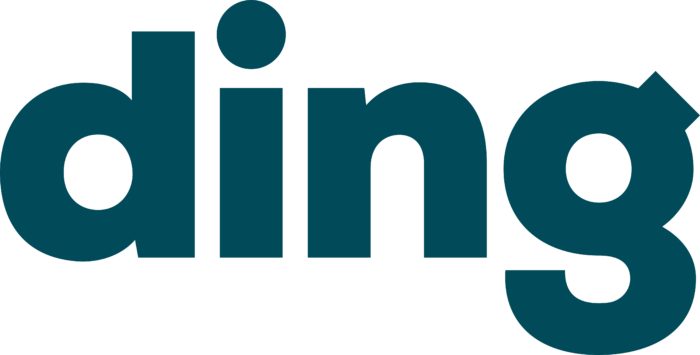
- Company type: Privately held company
- Industry: Telecommunications
- Founded: June 23, 2006 in Dublin, Ireland
- Founder: Mark Roden
- Area served: Worldwide
- Services: Mobile top-up
- Number of employees: 230+ (2022)
- Website: ding.com

Ding is an Irish mobile recharge service, allowing users to send mobile top-up to friends and family in over 150 countries and across more than 500 global operators.

== History ==
Ding was founded by Mark Roden on June 23, 2006. In October 2019 the company opened a new office in London. In 2016, Ding acquired French retail top-up company called Transfert Credit.

In 2018 Ding released its DingConnect API, allowing businesses to integrate the Ding platform to sell or offer mobile top-up on their website or mobile app. In 2018, the company was listed by the Financial Times as one of Europe's fastest growing companies. In January 2019, Ding agreed a partnership with Logista that will see it provide international top-up services at over 10,000 Spanish outlets. On May 19, 2019, Ding announced its partnership with LuLu Money to offer international mobile top-up to foreign workers living in the Asia Pacific region.

In 2021, Pollen Street Group acquired a majority stake in Ding.

As of 2022, its users have sent over 500 million mobile top-ups online, on the Ding app and across 600,000 retail outlets worldwide.
