= Textfree =

Instant messaging application by Pinger

Text Free (formerly Pinger)
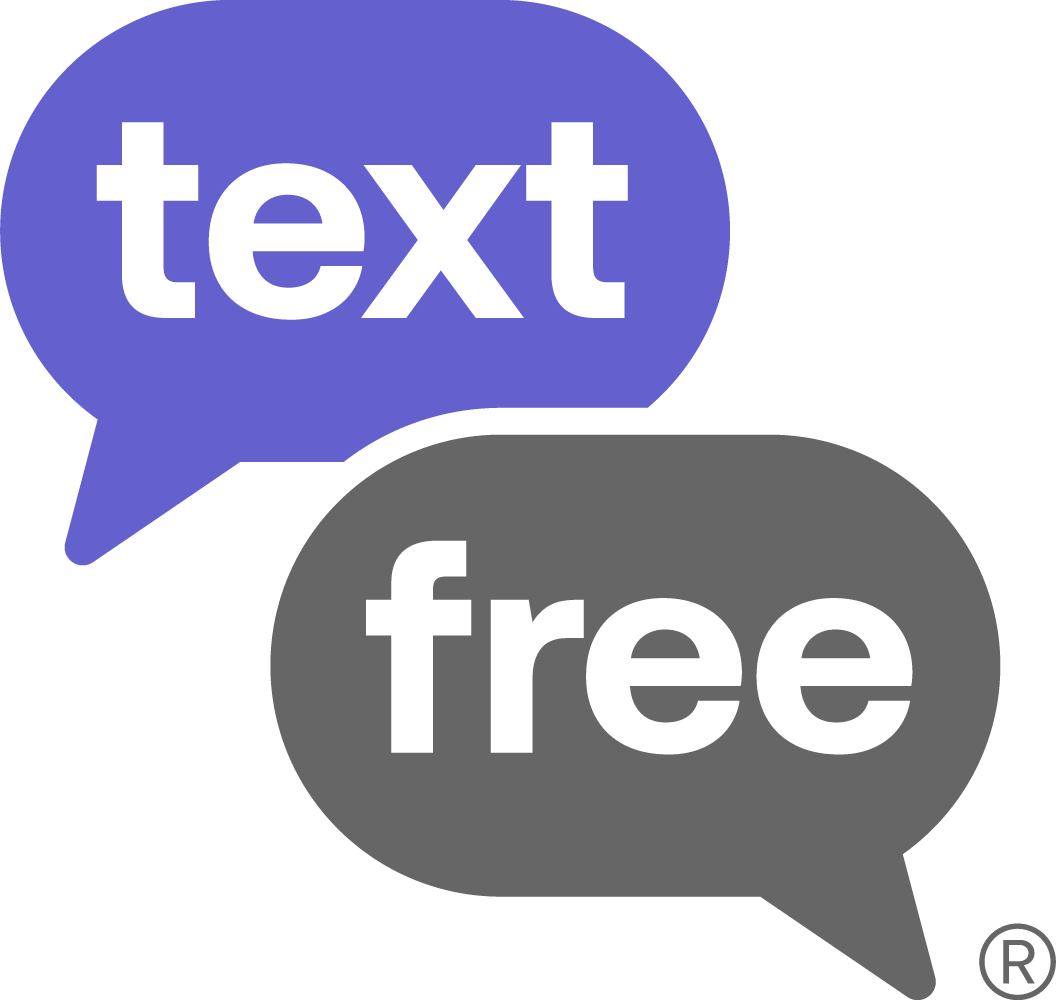
- Developer: Pinger, Inc.
- Initial release: 2006; 19 years ago
- Operating system: Android and iOS (mobile app); Windows and macOS (desktop version)
- Platform: Mobile; desktop; web
- Type: Texting and VoIP
- Licence: Proprietary
- Website: textfree.us

TextFree (formerly called Pinger and sometimes stylized as textfree) is a freemium mobile application and web service that allows users to send and receive text messages, as well as make and receive VoIP phone calls. TextFree was developed by American telecommunications provider Pinger, Inc. It was released in 2006.

TextFree states on its website that it has more than 130 million users (as of September 2022).

The mobile app runs on both iOS and Android devices, and there is a desktop version available for download on macOS and Windows. Users can also access TextFree's services online via a web browser.
