= Glenn Binger =

American politician

Member of the U.S. House of Representatives from Missouri's 41st district

Missouri House of Representatives
- Incumbent
- Assumed office 1975

Personal details
- Born: 1931 near Independence, Missouri, US
- Died: 2009 (aged 77–78)
- Party: Democratic
- Spouse: Cowta Jeneane Franks
- Children: 2 (1 son, 1 daughter)
- Occupation: auctioneer

Glenn H. Binger (February 8, 1931 - July 16, 2009) was an American Democratic politician who in the Missouri House of Representatives. He was born on a family farm near Independence, Missouri, and was educated at Blue Springs High School. On June 9, 1951, he married Cowta Jeneane Franks in Independence, Missouri. Binger worked as an auctioneer and was inducted into the Missouri Professional Auctioneers Association in 1985.
