= Pinger =

American telecom provider

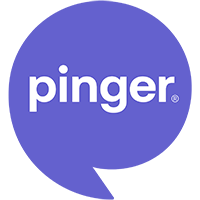
- Type: Corporation
- Industry: Texting and VoIP
- Founded: April 2005; 21 years ago
- Founders: Greg Woock; Joe Sipher
- Headquarters: San Jose, California, U.S.
- Key people: Greg Woock (CEO)
- Products: Textfree, Sideline, Index
- Website: www.pinger.com

Pinger, Inc. is a US telecom provider for free texts, pictures, calls, and voicemails. Pinger was founded in 2005 by former Palm, Inc. managers Greg Woock (CEO of Pinger, Inc) and Joe Sipher. The company is headquartered in San Jose, California.

== History ==
Pinger was founded in 2005 by Greg Woock and Joe Sipher. At first, the company created the Pinger Phone in 2008, which consolidated phone, email, and messaging contacts and communications. The free texting features were converted into a separate iPhone app called Textfree. Pinger was initially focused exclusively on mobile messaging, but started developing other smartphone apps after Apple released the iPhone software development kit (SDK).

== Products ==
The company has released several apps, mostly being available on iOS, Android, Microsoft Windows and Macintosh.

=== Textfree ===
Textfree is an app that allows users to call and text using a real phone number for free. The app has a free ad-supported version and a paid version. The app allows you to text anyone in the world.

=== Sideline ===
Sideline is an app that adds a second phone number to your phone using technology similar to Textfree. It's available for iOS, Android, Microsoft Windows and Macintosh. Their official website is sideline.com.

=== Index ===
Index is an app that provides a designated business phone number with voice and text capabilities. Index also provides automated text messaging for businesses.

== Company products ==
- Sideline - second phone number
- Textfree - free texting and calling
