= Ulla Dinger =

Swedish mathematician (born 1955)

Ulla Margarete Dinger
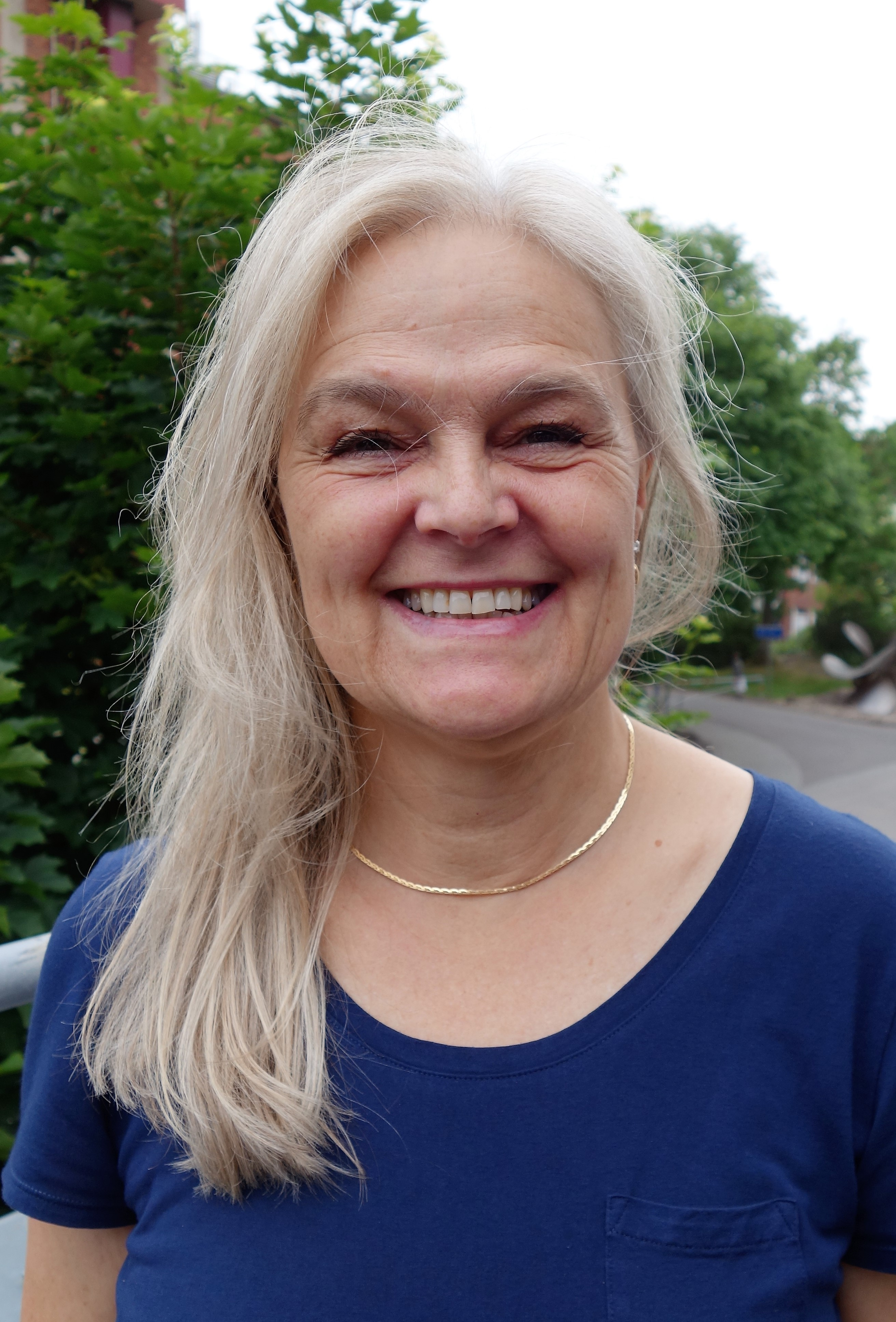
- Dinger in 2016
- Born: 1955
- Education: University of Gothenburg
- Occupation: Mathematician

Ulla Margarete Dinger (born 1955) is a Swedish mathematician specializing in mathematical analysis. She was the first woman to earn a doctorate in mathematics at the University of Gothenburg.

Dinger completed her doctorate at the University of Gothenburg in 1989. Her dissertation, On the ball problem and the Laguerre maximal operators, was jointly supervised by Christer Borell (of the Borell–Brascamp–Lieb inequality) and Peter Sjögren.

She is a senior lecturer in mathematics at the Chalmers University of Technology, where she used to teach real analysis and heads the program for the Preparatory Year in Natural Sciences.
