= Ding railway station =

Railway station

Ding Railway Station

General information
- Location: Ding, Sirsa district, Haryana; India
- Coordinates: 29.4607°N 75.2608°E
- Elevation: 203 metres (666 ft)
- System: Indian Railways station
- Owner: Indian Railways
- Operator: North Western Railway
- Line: Hisar–Bathinda line
- Platforms: 1
- Tracks: 3

Construction
- Structure type: Standard
- Parking: Yes
- Cycle facilities: Yes
- Accessible: No

Other information
- Status: Single electric line
- Station code: DING
- Zone(s): North Western Railway
- Division(s): Bikaner
Location

Ding Railway Station is a main railway station in Sirsa district, Haryana. Its code is DING. It serves Ding town. The station consists of two platforms. The platforms are well sheltered. It has many facilities like water and sanitation. It lies on Hisar–Bathinda line.
