= Binge Records =

Binge Records is a Brooklyn, NY based indie rock record label that was founded by Dennis Tyhacz and Luke McCartney in January 2004. "Signs of Life" by Nemo was the label's first release. Other releases on Binge Records include "The Calling" by The Sound Mirrors in 2007, and "Burn Away" (EP) by The Good Bad Guys in March 2009.

== See also ==
Review of Signs of Life Interview with Dennis Tyhacz & Luke McCartney Binge Records website

- List of record labels
