= Hirschsprung, Germany =

Hirschsprung
- Village of Altenberg
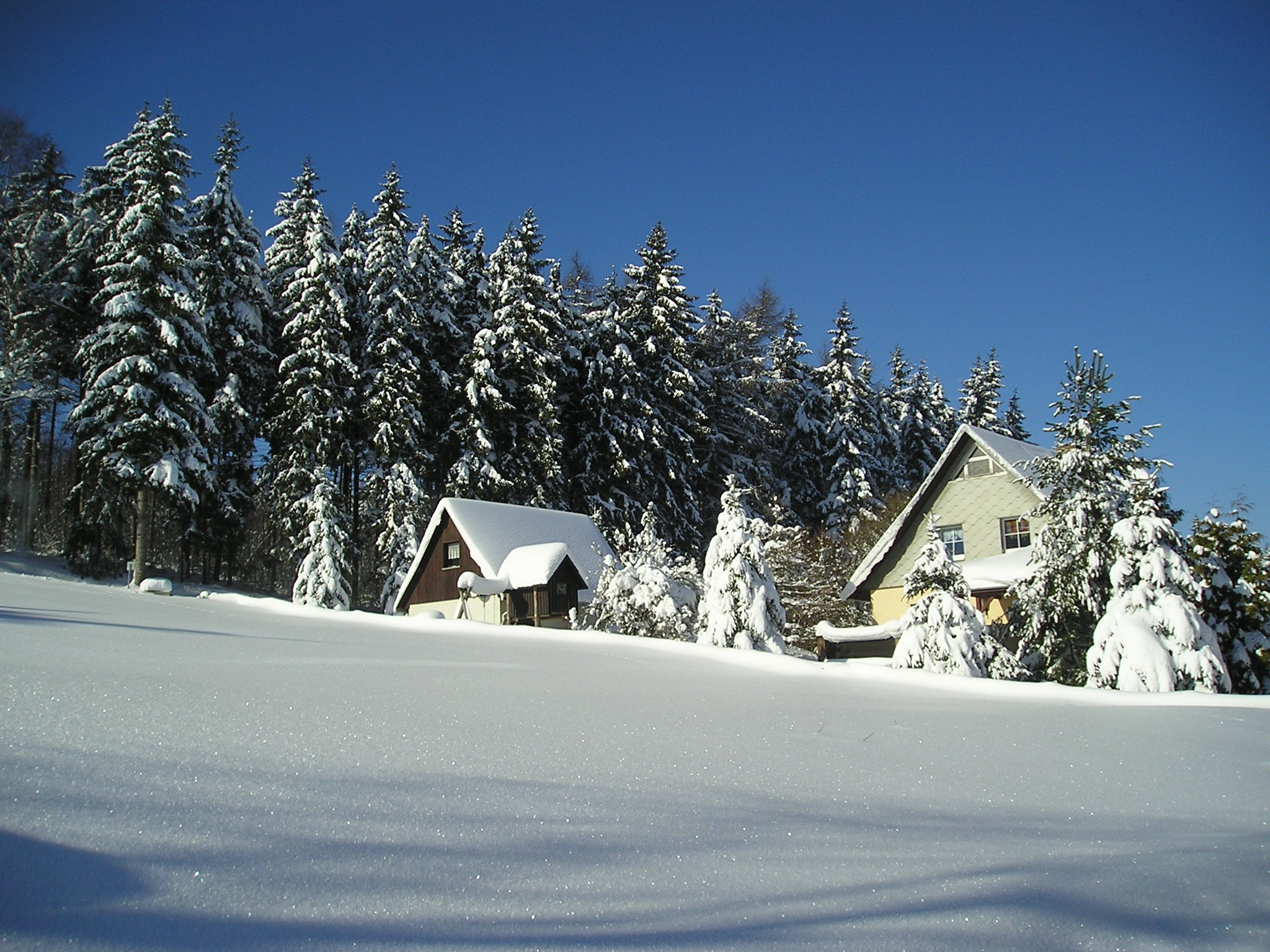
- Interactive map of Hirschsprung
- Location within Germany Location within Saxony
- Coordinates: 50°47′22″N 13°44′36″E
- Country: Germany
- State: Saxony
- District: Sächsische Schweiz-Osterzgebirge
- Town: Altenberg

Population (2018-12-31)
  - Total: 124
- Time zone: UTC+01:00 (CET)
  - Summer (DST): UTC+02:00 (CEST)
- Postal codes: 01773
- Dialling codes: 035056
- Vehicle registration: PIR
- Website: www.hirschsprung.de

Hirschsprung is a village and a former municipality in the eastern Ore Mountains in Saxony, Germany. It is 35 kilometres (22 mi) south of Dresden, 6 kilometres (4 mi) from Czech border. Since 1965 it has been part of the town of Altenberg.

== History ==
=== Foundation ===
First documented writing about the area around is dated 1464. It was signed by the knight Walzig at his castle Bärenstein. In 1491 a road from Altenberg on Dippoldiswalde to Dresden has been created. The settlement is mentioned in old documents in 1747 as Hirschbrunn and Hirschsprung. The first house of settlement was a forester's house.

=== New Age ===
In times of GDR Hirschsprung was a popular recreational area. At that time there were five hotels and a number of guesthouses and apartments. At peak times, 350 accommodations were available. After German reunification, most of them were closed. Today the only remaining hotel and restaurant is Ladenmühle, which is among the oldest buildings in general. There is a Sawmill which has a historical Framesaw.

== Sports ==
- Altenberg bobsleigh, luge, and skeleton track ("Rennschlitten- und Bobbahn Altenberg" - RSBB)
- Ski-Jump Riesengrundschanze (no longer active)

== Demographics ==
Year	Population
1834	112
1871	112
1890	123
1910	121
1925	150
1939	148
1946	181
1962	213
2009	111
2014	116

== Voluntary associations ==
- Heimatförderverein Hirschsprung e.V. (founded in 2001)
- Volunteer fire department Altenberg - Firefighter group Hirschsprung
- Erzgebirgsverein - Zweigverein Geising / Hirschsprung
