= Ngwii language =

Bantu language of the DRC

Ngwii
- Ngul
- Native to: DRC
- Native speakers: 8,000
- Language family: Niger–Congo?: Atlantic–Congo; Volta–Congo; Benue-Congo; Bantoid; Southern Bantoid; Bantu (Zone B); Ngwii

Language codes
- ISO 639-3: nlo
- Glottolog: ngul1247

Ngwii or Ngul is a Bantu language spoken in the Kwilu province of the Democratic Republic of the Congo.

Despite having a relatively small speech community, use of the language is prevalent.

== Phonology ==
Ngwii has 37 consonants and 7 vowels:

=== Consonants ===
		Bilabial	Labio-dental	Labiovelar	Alveolar	Post-alveolar	Palatal	Velar	Uvular
Plosive	plain	p, b			d, t			k	
Plosive	prenasalized	ᵐb, ᵐp			ⁿd, ⁿt			ᵑk, ᵑg	
Nasal		m			n		ɲ	ŋ	
Fricative	plain		f, v		s	ʃ, ʒ			ʁ
Fricative	prenasalized		ᵐf, ᵐv						
Affricative	plain		p͡f		t͡s, d͡z	t͡ʃ, d͡ʒ			
Affricative	prenasalized		ᵐp͡f		ⁿt͡s, ⁿd͡z	ⁿt͡ʃ, ⁿd͡ʒ			
Approximant				w			j		
Lateral					l				
Trill					r				

=== Vowels ===
	Front	Central	Back
High	i		u
Mid-high			ɤ
Mid/Mid-low	e [ɛ]	ə	o [ɔ]
Low		a	

== Numerals ==
Like other Niger-Congo languages, Ngwii has a base ten counting system where numbers after ten use the conjunction "ni" to add another number to reach higher values.

The first 20 numerals in Ngwii are

1. mo
2. ipe
3. isar
4. ini
5. itɛan
6. isom
7. sjambja
8. ɲani
9. ɲa
10. dzum
11. dzum ni mo
12. dzum ni pe
13. dzum ni sar
14. dzum ni ni
15. dzum ni tjan
16. dzum ni som
17. dzum ni sjambja
18. dzum ni ɲani
19. dzum ni iwaj
20. dzum na dzum
