= Jøkulskarvet Ridge =

Ridge in Antarctica

Jøkulskarvet Ridge (72°40′S 3°18′W) is a large mountainous ridge with an ice-capped summit, just northeast of Høgfonna Mountain in the Borg Massif of Queen Maud Land. It was mapped by Norwegian cartographers from surveys and from air photos by the Norwegian–British–Swedish Antarctic Expedition (1949–52) and named Jøkulskarvet (the glacier mountain).

== Features ==
- Bingen Cirque
- Bommen Spur
- Breidskaret Pass
- Jøkulgavlen Ridge, a prominent ridge forming the south part of Jokulskarvet Ridge
- Svellnuten Peak
