= Pinge =

Terrain depression created by mining activities

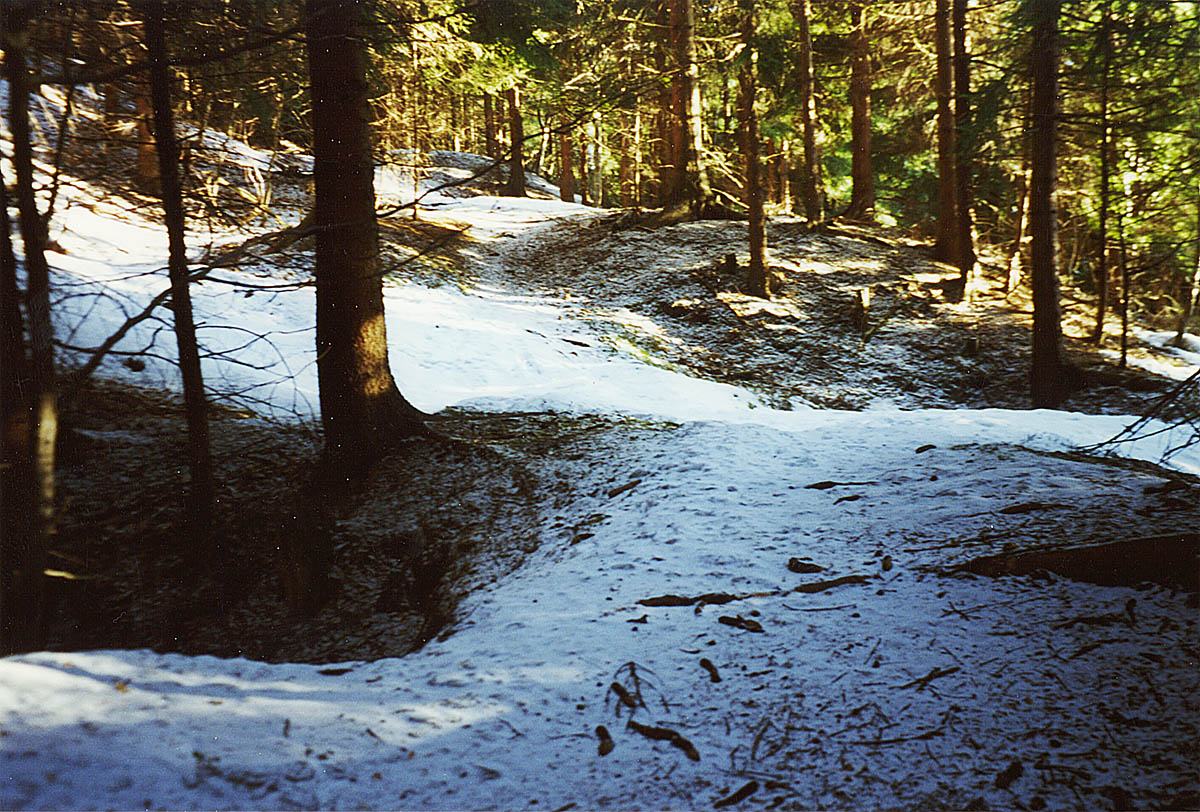
Medieval Pinge and ring-shaped bank at a mineshaft on the Ochsenhügel near Suhl in Germany's Thuringian Forest

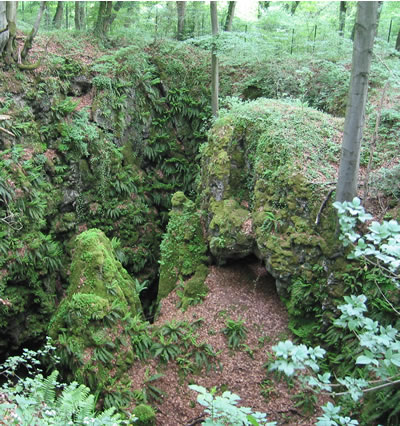
The Pinge of an iron ore pit near Warstein

A Pinge ([ˈpɪŋə], (Note: i.e. pronounced "pinger".) plural: Pingen) or Binge ('binger') is the name given in German-speaking Europe to a wedge-, ditch- or funnel-shaped depression in the terrain caused by mining activity. This depression or sinkhole is frequently caused by the collapse of old underground mine workings that are close to the Earth's surface. Unlike natural landforms, a Pinge is a direct result of human activity. The term has no direct equivalent in English, but may be translated as mining sinkhole, mine slump or, in some cases, as glory hole.

== Origin of the word ==
In the original sense of the word, the mining terms Pinge or Binge go back to the activity known as pingen, which meant something like 'prospecting'. An aufgepingter lode was one near the surface of the ground. The Pinge was therefore like a primitive open-pit mine.

Subsequently, the term was transferred to the funnel-shaped depressions that formed at the surface above filled or collapsed mineshafts. In lode mining, shafts and pits followed the strike of the lode and left behind the typical lines of Pingen (Pingenzüge) associated with medieval mining that may still be seen, for example, in the Thuringian Forest, the Upper Harz Mountains, the Ore Mountains and the Eschweiler area in central Europe.

Later on, the term Pinge was applied to many kinds of depression left in the terrain as a result of mining activity, including the holes left by open-cast pits in surface mining or the cave-ins above underground mines. The latter occurred either as a result of the unexpected consequences of active mining (often associated with accidents or disasters) or the subsidence above abandoned mines. They were sometimes willingly and knowingly accepted, for example, when mining was carried out by a method known as block caving.

A Pingenzug is a row of several Pingen in succession.

== Types ==
A Pinge can arise in different ways. In some cases it is caused by surface excavation. In other cases it follows the extraction of mineral deposits at a shallow depth and the associated with the collapse of the overburden that can result in subsidence at the surface. Pingen caused by surface mining generally date to the 16th and 17th centuries and are mostly only 0.5–1 m (1.6–3.3 ft) deep. Deeper Pingen, caused by collapse of the overburden, date to the 18th and 19th centuries. The Pinge, which is caused as a result of the subsidence of the surface of the terrain, is usually surrounded by a ring-shaped mound (German: Halde). A number of Pingen form trenches up to 250 m (820 ft) long and 15 m (49 ft) wide.

=== Excavation ===
Formation of a Pinge as a result of coal mining. Key: Halde = mound; Pinge = Pinge; Flöz = coal seam; Hangrutschung = side wall slippage; ursprüngliche Grabung = original pit; Grundwasser = groundwater

Initially, the extraction of ore or coal took place near the surface at outcrops of the main deposits. Excavations of seam-like deposits were carried out by digging out bowl-shaped depressions, the so-called Pütts, that miners hewed out along the course of the seam with picks and shovels. Once digging reached the water table, groundwater ran into the hole. If the quantity of water was so great that it entered the pit faster than it could be drained, the holes filled up with groundwater. To make matters worse, the ingress of water and the consequent softening of the soil reduced the stability of the side walls. For this reason, the pit was simply abandoned in such cases and a new one dug some distance away. Over the years, these hollows became Pingen. In the southern Ruhr, there are numerous such Pingen caused by surface mining. Subsequent erosion and collapse has produced funnel-shaped hollows, the Pingen. Where Pingen have resulted from surface mining, small ring-shaped tips were often made by dumping the waste rock.

Another origin of Pingen occurred in a method of lignite mining called Kuhlenbau or 'pit mining'. Here, the brown coal was extracted by means of small, square, open pit known as a Kuhle. As one pit was exhausted, it was filled with spoil from the next. In this way, a row of several hollows or Pingen was created.

=== Collapse ===
Pingen were also caused by the mining of a lode near the surface that was not properly supported. When a deposit is exploited through underground mining, there are pressures and strains along the hanging walls. Over time, the hanging wall slips along the tear line into the mine cavity. Pingen are mining sinkholes covering a small area. But like the continual, large-scale subsidence caused by large-scale mining at great depths, the overburden of mines near the surface collapses at regular intervals along a tear line. This subsidence of the strata is usually accompanied by an audible mining shockwave (Bergschlag). The actual shape of the Pinge is primarily determined by the different rock formations. In addition, the shape and appearance of Pingen is influenced by their age. A Pinge which is only shallow and only gently shaped over its entire surface is usually older than a Pinge with sharp contours.

How quickly an underground cavity near the surface collapses is dependent on various factors. Key criteria are the depth and the stability of the overburden. The depth of the Pinge is essentially determined by the size of the cavity created. If larger voids are created at less depth as in the mining technique known as Tummelbau ('underground pit mining'), the Pinge can be several metres deep. This sort of mining damage is particularly problematic if it occurs in a populated area.

==== Schachtpinge ====
A Schachtpinge ('shaft pinge') is a particular type of Pinge caused by the collapsing of old surface mineshafts. Especially in the early days of mining, many smaller mineshafts were sunk. The shafts were predominantly lined with mine timber. Only in rare cases was natural stone, brick or concrete used for this purpose. If these wells were then abandoned, the wooden lining rotted over the years, fell away and then the pit collapsed, leading to the formation of a Schachtpinge. The diameter and depth of a Schachtpinge depends on the size of the shafts, and whether the shaft had been filled in and the quality of the infill. Another cause for the emergence of a Schachtpinge was so-called Duckelbau mining. In this type of mining, the overburden in the area of the shaft usually collapsed very quickly, because ore was dug out just a few metres below the surface and, in most cases, not in solid rock.

==== Stollenpinge ====
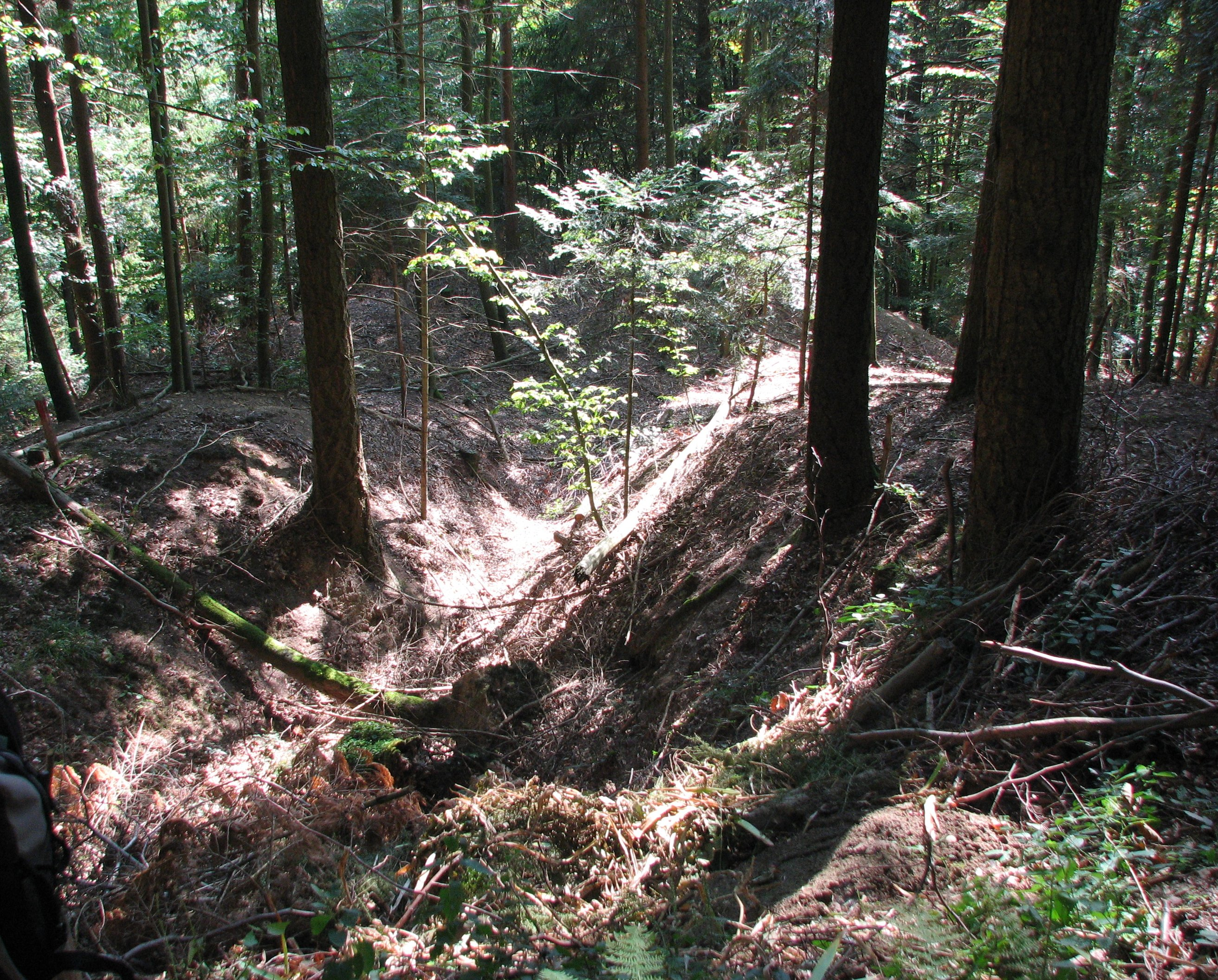
A Stollenpinge and mound, 16th-17th century, viewed from above

A Stollenpinge is caused by the collapse of parts of a mining gallery (Stollen) that is usually located at levels close to the surface or in weathered rock. They are generally easily recognizable from their typical asymmetrical shape and their shape of the depression which, unlike Pingen caused by excavations, is normally greater on the uphill side as well as their rather large mounds.

== Examples of well-known Pingen ==
The following Pingen were formed by the collapse of overburden.

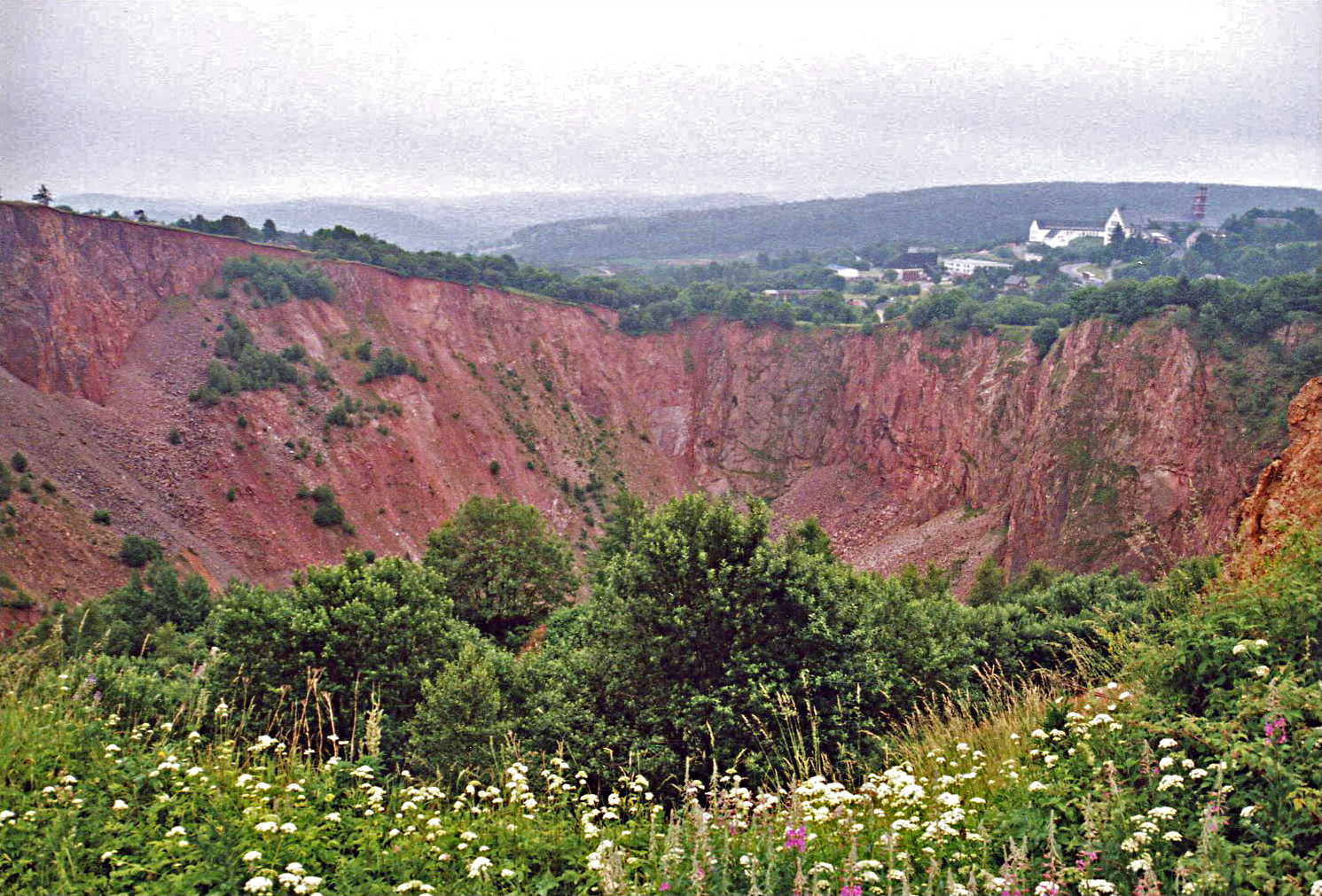
View of the Pinge in Altenberg.

Altenberg (Germany)
the first collapses occurred as early as 1545 as a result of the uncontrolled mining (by fire-setting) of the Altenberg tin ore mountain. Later on, ore was extracted both from the solid rock as well as the broken rock mass. As a result of continued, unchecked fire-setting of the solid rock, there was a significant amount of further excavation which was unable to withstand the pressure of the overburden. In 1578, 1583, 1587 and 1619 there were further collapses, although it is not clear whether these were caused deliberately. The largest occurred on 24 January 1620. This destroyed 36 pits and created a funnel-shaped hole on the surface that covered 2 ha (4.9 acres). In the following centuries, mining was continued by extracting the broken rock "from below" until 1991. Further fractures took place, initially uncontrolled, but later planned. As a result, the Altenberg Pinge grew 150 m (490 ft) deep and 450 m (1,480 ft) in diameter, covering an area of 12 ha (30 acres) by the time tin ore working ceased. Today the Great Pinge is not only one of the attractions of the town of Altenberg, but was also designated in May 2006 by the Academy of Geosciences at Hanover as one of the 77 most important national geotopes in Germany.

Falun (Sweden)
Uncontrolled copper mining at the Great Copper Mountain led in 1687 to a large-scale collapse of the mine. The resulting Pinge, known as Stora Stöten, is today 95 m deep and 350 m wide.

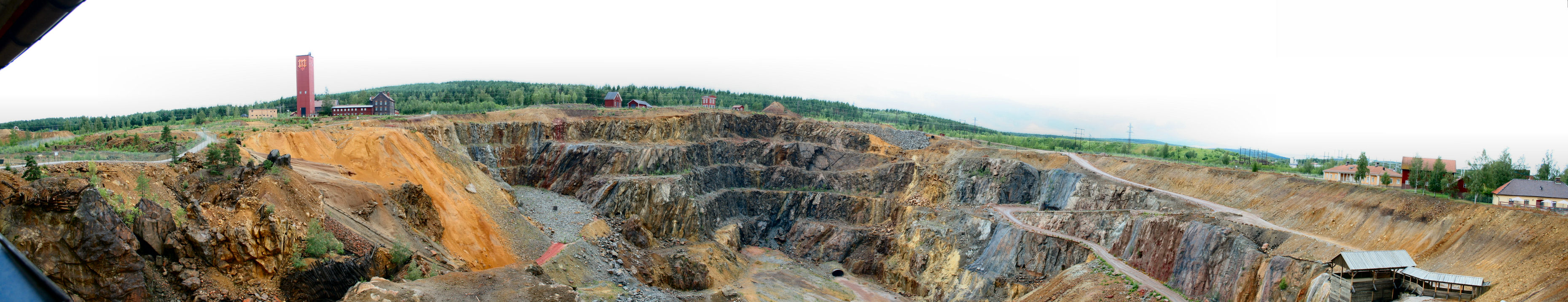
Panorama of the mine in Falun

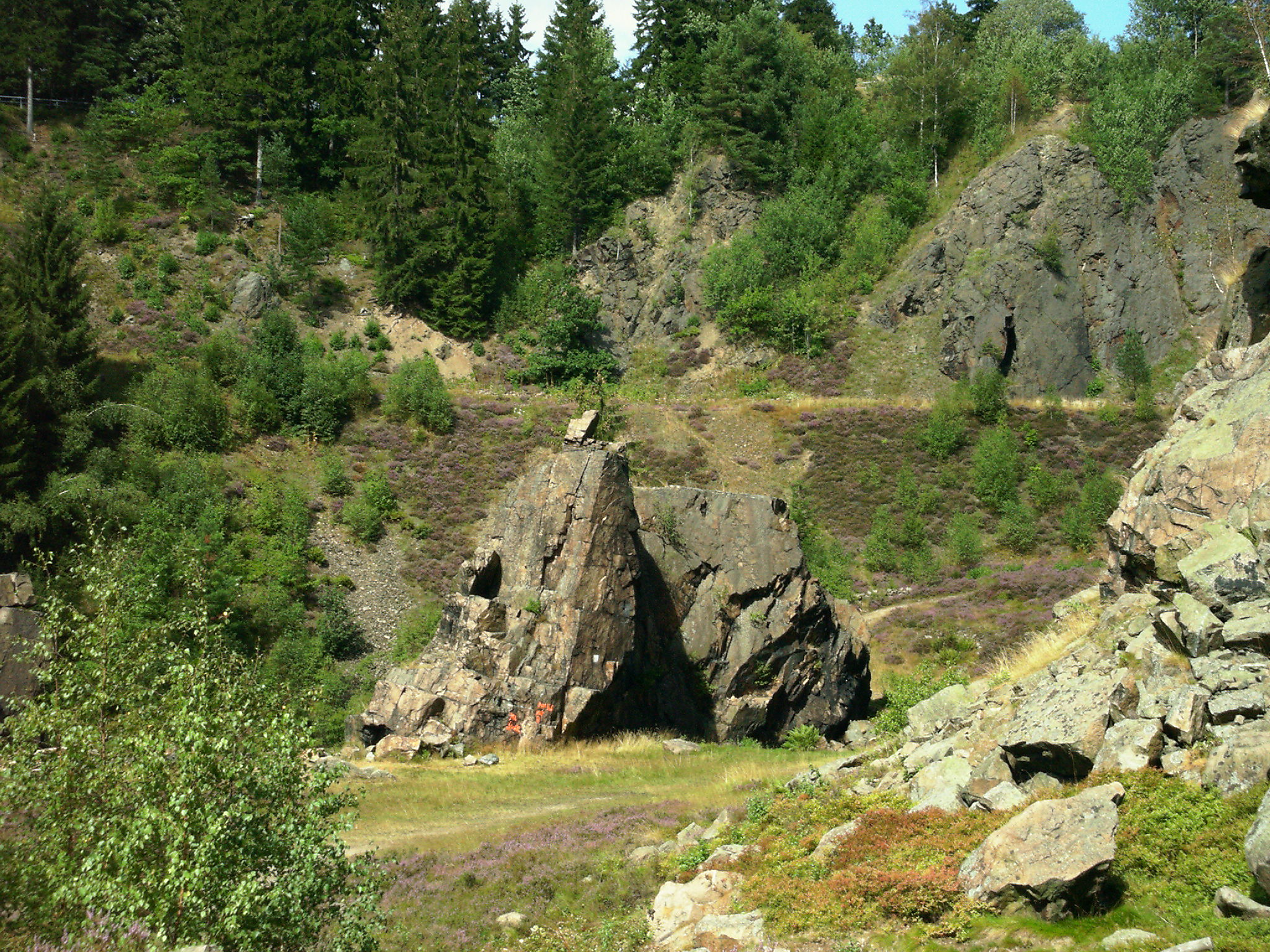
The Geyersche Binge

Geyer (Germany)
The Geyersche Binge (50.621108°N 12.928289°E) was caused by intensive overworking of the pits under the Geyersberg hill. In 1704, after a cavern up to 35 m (115 ft) high and, at its foot, 40 m (130 ft) wide had been dug out, the first big cave-in occurred at the surface. This was followed by others up to 1803. The last disastrous collapse happened on 11 May 1803. It led to the cessation of underground mining. From 1851, a quarry firm mined the broken rock in the Binge. When that closed in 1935, the Binge was made a nature reserve. Today it is 50–60 m (160–200 ft) deep and covers an area of about 200 by 250 m (660 by 820 ft).

Plattenberg (Czech Republic)
At Plattenberg there are two well-known Pingen (50.398689°N 12.778473°E), relicts of an old tin mine. The Eispinge ('Ice Pinge', Czech: Ledová Jáma) was caused by the collapse of a gallery. The name of this natural monument is due to its ravine-like shape. All year round, heavy, cold and damp air sinks down to the floor of the crevice which is only 1 m (3.3 ft) wide, but 15–20 m (49–66 ft) deep. Light, warm air never penetrates it. As a result, cave ice and snow lie all year round in the Pinge. In 1813, snow and ice from the Eispinge were transported as far as Leipzig to be used in the care of the wounded at the Battle of Leipzig. The appearance of the neighbouring Wolfspinge ('Wolf's Pinge', Czech: Vlčí Jáma) goes back to the collapse of the old Wolfgang Pit. It is about 200 m (660 ft) long, up to 45 m (148 ft) wide and up to 25 m (82 ft) deep.

Seiffen (Germany)
In Seiffen near the church are two neighbouring sinkholes up to 34 m (112 ft) deep above the old tin mine that are called the Geyerin and Neuglücker Stockwerkspinge. They were probably formed in the 16th century as a result of fire-setting. As in Altenberg, mining carried on even after the collapse. Unlike Altenberg, however, the rubble was mined at the surface using a gantry crane (Förderbrücke). Mining operations shut down in the 19th century. Since 1934, there has been an open-air stage in the Geyerin. (50.646266°N 13.453879°E).

== See also ==
- Caldera
- Cenote
- Ponor
- Sinkhole
