= Borg Massif =

Mountain in Antarctica

- Borgmassivet
- Location within Earth

Highest point
- Peak: Høgsaetet Mountain
- Elevation: 2,717 m (8,914 ft)
- Coordinates: 72°45′S 3°30′W

Geography
- Continent: Antarctica
- Sector: Queen Maud Land

Climbing
- Easiest route: snow/ice climb

Borg Massif is a mountain massif, about 50 km (30 mi) long and with summits above 2,700 metres (8,900 ft), situated along the northwest side of the Penck Trough in Queen Maud Land, East Antarctica. The tallest peak, at 2,727 metres (8,947 ft), is Hogsaetet Mountain. The parallel, ice-filled Raudberg Valley and Frostlendet Valley trend northeastward through the massif, dividing its summits into three rough groups:

== Discovery and naming ==
The feature was photographed from the air by the Third German Antarctic Expedition (1938–1939), led by Captain Alfred Ritscher, but was not correctly shown on the maps by the expedition. It was mapped in detail by Norwegian cartographers from surveys and air photos by the Norwegian–British–Swedish Antarctic Expedition (1949–1952), led by John Schjelderup Giæver. It was remapped by air photos taken by the Sixth Norwegian Antarctic Expedition (1958–1959). They named it "Borgmassivet" (the castle massif) in association with Borg Mountain, its most prominent feature.

== Features ==
- Located at the northern end of the Borg Massif is the summit of Borg Mountain, a large, flattish, ice-topped mountain with many exposed rock cliffs. Dugurdspiggen Peak lies 4 nautical miles (7.4 kilometres; 4.6 miles) north of the massif.
- Located at the northeastern end of the Borg Massif is the summit of Ytstenut Peak. The name "Ytstenut" means "outermost peak" in the Norwegian language.
- Located at the southern end of the Borg Massif is the summit of Hogfonna Mountain. The name "Hogfonna" means "the high snowfield" in the Norwegian language.

== See also ==
- Flesa Rock
- List of mountains of Queen Maud Land
- Ruvungane Peaks
- Småtind Peak
- Stridbukken Mountain
