= Tio Kingdom =

Pre-colonial West-Central African state

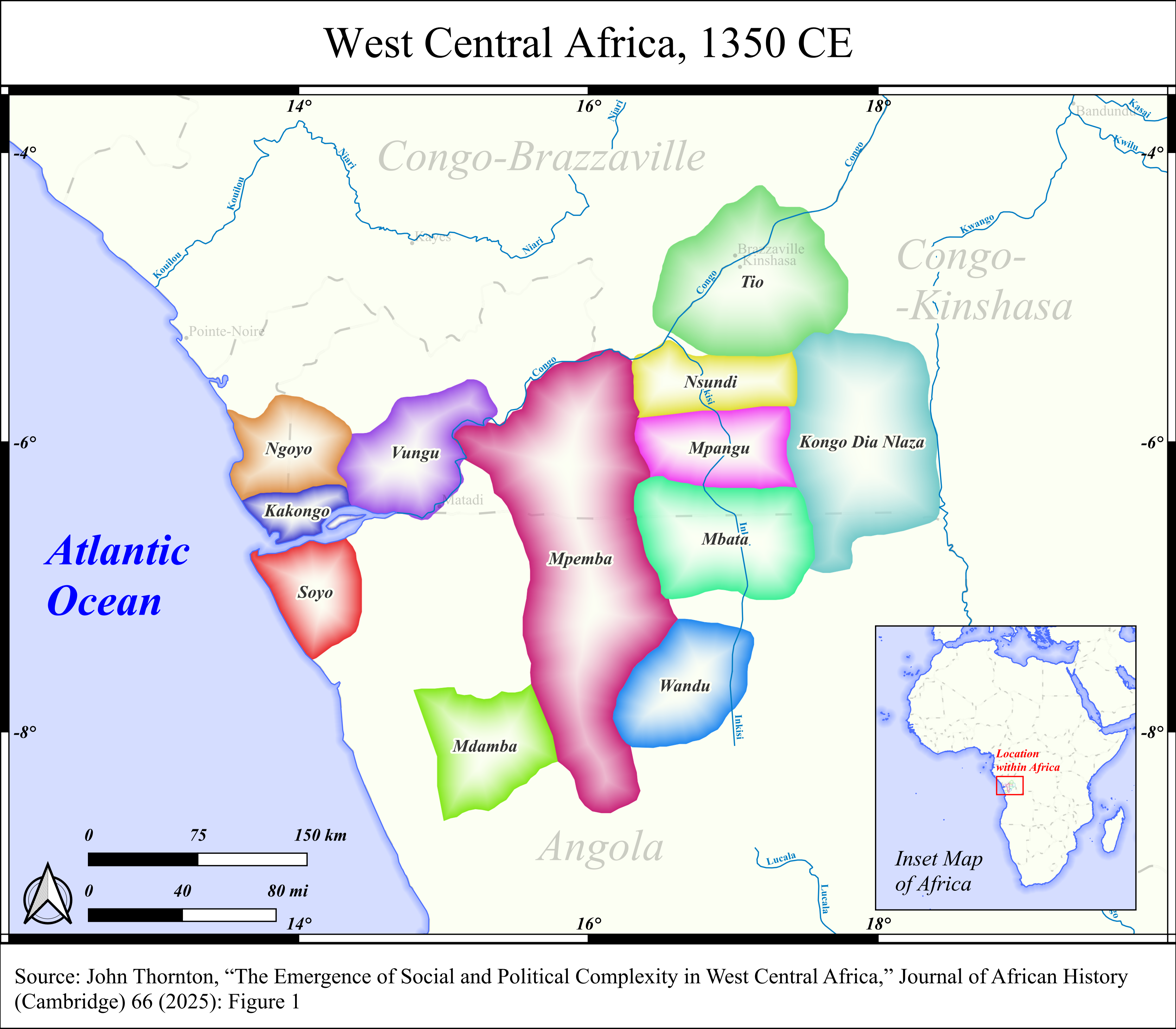
- States of the western Congo Basin, including Tio, c. 1350
- Status: State from 14th c.–1880 Currently a non-sovereign monarchy within Republic of Congo
- Capital: "Mbe" (Note: Mbe derives from the term for capital.) (changed location often); Mbé (c.1880)
- Government: Monarchy
- Õkoo
  - c.1870–1892: Iloo I (last sovereign)
  - 2021–present: Michel Ganari Nsalou II (current)
- History
  - Established: 14th century
  - French protectorate: 1880
Succeeded by
French Congo; Congo Free State
- Today part of: Republic of Congo, DR Congo

The Tio Kingdom (Note: Also called the Teke Kingdom, Tyo Kingdom, Anziku Kingdom, or Great Makoko. The terms Anzico, Anzique, Ansiku and Anziku were not exclusively used to refer to the Teke. Some early European sources also associated these terms with Kongo populations of the province of Nsundi (Sundi), particularly those of the districts of Nsanga and Mazinga (Masinga).) was a West Central African state in modern-day Republic of the Congo and DR Congo, belonging to the Tio people (Eastern Teke). With its capital on the Mbe plains (where modern-day Mbe is) and its commercial capital at Pool Malebo, the kingdom extended over 200 mi (320 km) north to south, and over 150 mi (240 km) east to west.

Founded around the 14th century, it rivalled the Kingdom of Kongo for much of its early existence. During the 18th century, nkobi (boxes containing charms which legitimised power) were introduced among Tio lords, diminishing the authority of the õkoo (king) and empowering a lord in the north titled Nzã Mbã. In the early-19th century after the death of Nzã Mbã, Õkoo Opontaba captured the nkobi, causing an internal conflict against northern lords which ended inconclusively, yet saw royal prestige strengthened. The kingdom soon entered another period of decline amid the Bobangi wars and a revolt, and became a French protectorate in 1880. The kingdom continued to exist as a non-sovereign monarchy, and the current monarch is Michel Ganari Nsalou II, ruling since 2021.

== Geography ==
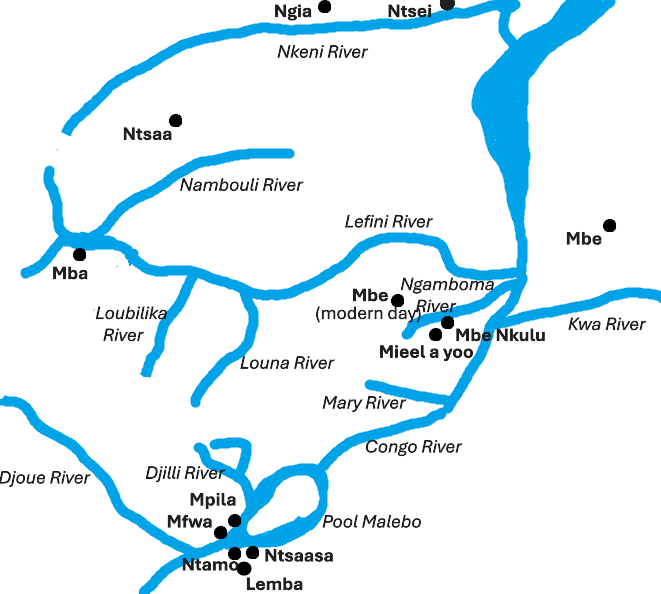
Map of various Tio settlements.

The environment consists of expansive grasslands on a plateau, with small forest in some places. The eastern Teke (Tio proper) inhabited this plateau near Pool Malebo, with the western Teke on lower ground in the basins of the Nduou River (a tributary to the Upper Niari River) and the Foulakary and Djoué rivers (tributaries to the Lower Congo River). The plateau is covered by Hyparrhenia, Rhynchelytrum, Landolphia, and Imperata grasses, as well as the odd Hymenocardia acida or Annona tree, also being home to lions.

== History ==
=== Origins ===
Tio tradition holds that they have always inhabited the grassland plains; from neighbouring groups reporting that the Tio (eastern Teke) were already there when they arrived, it is known for certain that they were there from at least the 13th century. While Tio tradition also says that their kingdom has always existed, historian Didier Gongola says that it was founded in the 14th century through the fusion of smaller kingdoms. Jan Vansina wrote that the political system of squires/chiefs (ngántsii or mpfõ antsii) who governed domains (ntsii) likely evolved into kingship and statehood, and that the õkoo (king) was likely initially based on the northern plains. He considered the king to have derived authority from mystical prowess, with which he used to give titles to lords and squires and receive tribute. This is evidenced by a series of six anvils dedicated to the king and five lords, who were all from the north, located near the Falls of Lefini where Nkwe Mbali (the national nature spirit) was believed to reside. The association of kingship with smithing is believed to have originated among the Tio before spreading to the kingdoms of Loango and Kongo.

=== Early history ===
In the 15th century, the Kingdom of Kongo's conquests eastward brought it into conflict with the Tio Kingdom which halted their expansion. In 1491 the manikongo (Kongo's king) asked the Portuguese for help against the Tio. The earliest written mention of an õkoo was of a "Mukoko Ansiko" in 1507. (Note: Makoko, a term commonly found in European records, is a Vili derivation on the Teke word õkoo, meaning "king". Ansiku was the Kikongo term for the Tio.) The Tio continued to war with Kongo throughout the 16th century, killing at least one of its manikongos (Henrique I in 1568 and possibly Bernardo I in 1567). At the same time the Jaga invaded Kongo from the east, disrupting trade. Written records from this time mention multiple Tio kingdoms, possibly indicating a degree of decentralisation. They bordered Mwene Muji to the northeast. Kongo traditions claim the õkoo sent them tribute.

After being expelled from Kongo in the early-17th century, the Jaga moved north, settled near Loango, and overran the western Teke. In the 1630s the Tio had close relations with the Boma Kingdom and "held a peace". In the mid-17th century Dutch writer Olfert Dapper wrote that the Tio king ruled over 13 other "kings", possibly a reference to the "twelve lords of the crown" who all had titles associated with the king's installation ritual (lisee). At this time, the king's capital was recorded as "Monsol". In 1698 a war broke out between lord Ngobila (Note: Ngobila means "king of the water".) of Ntsaasa (now Kinshasa) on one side and his nkani (vassal squires) and the Humbu chiefs of Lemba on the other. The rebels burnt Ntsaasa, causing Ngobila to flee to Ntamo (now Kinshasa). As both sides garnered allies from nearby settlements, Ngobila returned to his domain's border at the Lukunga River to fight a battle, however wasn't successful. The rebels installed another candidate as Ngobila. (Note: Vansina considered the 1880s' Ntsuulu of Kinshasa to have descended from the deposed Ngobila. The holder of the Ngobila title in the 1880s was based in Mswata.) In the late-17th and early-18th centuries the Tio warred against the Boma. Around 1710 a Tio prince led an army far into Boma territory, though was forced to withdraw due to heavy rain and floods. Another campaign was defeated near Luvua around 1740.

=== Nkobi and royal authority ===
In the 17th century there were two main trade routes from Pool Malebo: one from the Vili in Loango and one from the Portuguese in Luanda. Around 1700, following an influx of wealth from the Loango route, nkobi (boxes containing charms which legitimised power) were introduced among lords on the northern plains after diffusing from Abala, creating an ideology of power detached from the king. A lord titled Ngia (based just north of the Nkéni River) is said to have obtained them, and gave them to high lord Nzã Mbã, (Note: Nzã Mbã means "creator of Mba".) who was based at Ntsaa (south of the Nkéni River). He then sold and distributed them among his nkani (vassal lords), diminishing the king's authority. Tradition portrays Nzã Mbã as wealthy and powerful, and he was said to have owned lots of unũ (luxury brass objects from Loango). His hunters (which included Tswa) hunted elephants for ivory, and were sold into slavery if they came back empty-handed. He regularly declared "war at the limits" on other lords in order to accrue ivory and slaves, and tradition recounts that he exploited every possible source of income. Using his wealth, retinue, muskets, and slaves, Nzã Mbã came to be wookuru (leader) of all lords.

After the death of Nzã Mbã in the early-19th century, (Note: There is a large tumulus located at Mpiini Ntsa that is said to be the resting place of either Nzã Mbã or the first king.) Õkoo Opontaba (who built Mbe Nkulu, "Old Mbe", as his capital), captured all eight or twelve nkobi in the north, assisted by lords near Mbé. Another powerful lord, Muidzu Mpio, led the northern lords against the king, culminating in a battle at Idzwa Itieerie (near Mbé) that ended inconclusively. It is unclear whether the lords settled at Mbe Nkulu, or they were defeated and Õkoo Opontaba appointed their successors there. According to tradition, the nkobi were redistributed among those of the northern plains near Ntsaa, and those in the east near Mbé. Vansina however thought the status quo antebellum to have been maintained. Regardless, the king's authority had been reaffirmed.

=== Bobangi wars, decline, and French colonisation ===
From around the time of the death of Õkoo Opontaba sometime between c. 1810 and c. 1820, Mbe Nkulu and royal prestige entered a second period of decline. This has been attributed to famine, the Bobangi wars, and internecine conflict between lords. Sometime between 1820 and 1840/50 the Tio fought a conflict against the Bobangi, who were attempting to break the Tio's monopoly over trade. The conflict consisted of a series of raids and counter-raids between Tio lords and Bobangi chiefs. The Bobangi launched an unsuccessful attack on Ntsaasa. With help from the Nunu the Bobangi won the second war, though weren't able to settle there; the conflict resulted in the Tio retaining control over the trade centres at the Pool, while the Bobangi gained control over the river. Around the mid-19th century, Õkoo Pieele (Õkoo Opontaba's son) faced a revolt from a claimant (his nephew) supported by the Muidzu, forcing him to leave Mbe Nkulu for a new capital, Ngõ. The claimant was defeated, and Õkoo Pieele sent his brothers and nephews, who he had appointed as lords (possibly a cause of the revolt), to settle further away to act as buffers to the defeated claimant; this diminished the king's control over his lords. Over the second half of the 19th century, the decline of royal prestige intensified, mostly because of the prosperity Ngeiliino, a powerful high lord, enjoyed at Mieel a yoo.

Õkoo Iloo I (Õkoo Pieele's son) came to power sometime between 1865 and 1875. In 1877 a runaway slave called Ngaliema came to rule in Ntamo. In 1879 a squire in the north met Italian-French explorer Pierre Savorgnan de Brazza, who was looking to buy land, and sent him to the capital, Mbe. There Iloo, ignoring the advice of lords Ngeiliino Opontaba (Iloo's brother) and Ngampo Ikukuri, negotiated a treaty with de Brazza, signed 10 September, which transferred the Tio's sovereignty to France. (Note: The treaty read: "King Makoko, who is sovereign over the lands lying between the mouth of the Lefini and Ncouna (Pool), having ratified the cession of territory made by Ngampey for the establishment of a French station and moreover ceded his hereditary rights of supremacy...") De Brazza promised benefits of trade and an alliance, which was likely interpreted as military assistance. While some sources attest that Iloo was aware of the consequences, Vansina wrote that "it seems clear that he only wanted to cede land for the establishment of a commercial station", and that his desire for an alliance may have been influenced by the hostility of Henry Stanley's expedition a few years earlier (who had been ambushed by Ngobila). De Brazza gained most of Mfwa (now Brazzaville), planted a French flag at Okila, and signed another treaty with some lords on 3 October, before leaving Malamine Camara in charge. The Franco-Belgian rivalry over the Congo latched onto divisions in Tio politics as Stanley and the Belgian Association came to side with Ngaliema of Ntamo, and De Brazza and the French with Ntsuulu of Ntsaasa, with similar divisions deriving from commercial competition elsewhere at the Pool. In 1881 under pressure from his chiefs and traders, Ngaliema turned against Stanley, though the latter gained the support of the Humbu, causing Ngaliema to renege. Leopoldville was subsequently founded as a commercial station in December 1881.

On the Mbe plains in 1881, a dispute arose between Ngampo Ikukuri and the Ngantsu over their father's inheritance. War broke out, and Ngantsu was forced to flee to the Bobangi, coming to side with Stanley and the Association. Ngeiliino Opontaba sided with Ngantsu while Õkoo Iloo lent support to Ikukuri and Ngandzio. (Note: Vansina wrote that Iloo's partisanship was based on a false assumption Ikukuri would be defeated and Opontaba would grow even more powerful. The formation of opposing coalitions that involved Iloo meant that he was unable to act as a mediator in the dispute, and Tio tradition portrays him as powerless, such that Opontaba and Ikukuri "would [not] listen to him".) Opontaba came to have good relations with the Association, causing Ngaliema to attempt to blockade Leopoldville in 1883. The French and de Brazza returned, with whom Iloo ratified the treaty in April 1884, to which Opontaba and Ngantsu were forced to agree, signifying a political victory for Iloo. The French brought copious amounts of gifts for the king, with lords receiving half of his amount; Brazzaville was founded in May. In response the Association pressured Opontaba to resume his hostility, and the French spread rumours of murder plots to the king. The French sent a garrison to Iloo's Mbe while the Association sent firearms to Opontaba. The result of the Berlin Conference in 1885 neutralised the Franco-Belgian rivalry. Over the course of the next few years the French and the Association expanded the remit of their administrations, no longer needing their African allies. The Europeans became more violent and burnt down the Humbu's Lemba, the Bobangi's Mpila, and Ngaliema's Ntamo, as the Tio came to submit and focus on commerce. From 1888, the French began granting brass collars, a Tio symbol of rule, to lords at the Pool, and enacted taxation. The Mbe plains were ignored by the French, and the situation there at this time are unknown, other than that the hostility between Iloo and Opontaba dissipated. Iloo died in 1892.

=== Colonial and postcolonial periods ===
Õkoo Iloo was succeeded by Õkoo Mbandieele in 1892 (possibly influenced by France). After Ngeiliino Opontaba's death c. 1895, war broke out between his sons, and lord Ngandzio (ally of Ngampo Ikukuri) and his sons, as Ngandzio attempted to influence the succession. Ngandzio failed and lost influence as a result. During Mbandieele's reign, the Matadi–Kinshasa Railway was completed, and the Tio lost their prominence at the Pool. The administrator of Brazzaville travelled to inform the king they desired to take his lands north of the Lefini, and a fight broke out causing the administrator to retreat. The French returned, killed "a dozen" Tio, and beat up Mbandieele, taking him to Brazzaville where he died in 1899. His successor, Õkoo Ikukuri, had to travel to Brazzaville to be formally instated. Õkoo Ngaayüo succeeded Ikukuri in 1907, and early-on successfully influenced the succession of the Muidzu. In 1912 the French established Mpala and Kindongo to administer the plains. In a feud with a town Ngaayüo took all their fowl and burned the town, whose people complained to the French. They imprisoned Ngaayüo at Mpala for some time, after which he fled to Ngabe, and died during an epidemic in 1918. Õkoo Ngaayüo's successor died travelling back from Brazzaville, believed to have been poisoned by Waafitieere Ngalifourou (Iloo's second wife, then Queen Mother). The French installed Ngalifourou as chef de canton as the throne remained empty, symbolising the defeat of kingship.

While kingship later returned, no future kings underwent lisee, the king's installation ritual. Though Ngalifourou opposed nominations to the throne, Õkoo Mundzwaani was instated in 1928. He was deposed by the French and a series of short reigns followed, as the king's authority was reduced to less than that of a chef de canton and Ngalifourou remained dominant. Her death in 1956 changed this dynamic, as the new chef de canton could not play the same role. The French began giving kings a salary, car, and residence, though their authority remained muted. Likely because of this, a coalition of lords that included Ngandzio formed against the king, Õkoo Ntsaalu. The Republic of Congo gained its independence in 1960. In 1964 the coalition of lords deposed Ntsaalu, replacing him with Õkoo Iloo II, though this remained minor in Congolese politics. In 1969 a Marxist regime came to power and dissolved the country's non-sovereign monarchies. With the advent of democratic rule in 1991, Pierre Mialami Wawa was appointed as monarch. He signed the 1995 Pact for Peace after the country's civil war, and died in 1998. The Ngalifourou (Queen Mother) appoints the ruler. As of 2025, the current monarch is Michel Ganari Nsalou II, ruling since 2021.

== Government ==
=== Kingship ===
The state was headed by an õkoo (king). His first wife was titled Ngaasaa, and his second Waafitieere. Ngaasaa was head of the royal court along with a high lord titled Ngeiliino. The king resided in his royal enclosure (iko) in the capital (for which he also acted as its headman), and the settlement was guarded, as were the roads and rivers leading there. Some lords are also known to have lived in the capital, such as those titled Nganshibi, Motiiri, Ngambiõ, Ngeiliino, and Ngaaliõ. The king used royal messengers to govern, who were greatly respected. Succession was limited to those who were part of the king's kin (baamukaana lilimpu), specifically patrilineal kin, and had ancestors from the sacred forests (idzwa) of Ndua, Mbe aNdzieli, or Ilde. The successor was chosen by consensus between lords Ngeiliino and Ngandzio, and Ngampo and Ngaaliõ (who were nkani of Ngeiliino, ie. vassal chiefs).

The king's right to rule derived from his control over the national nkira (nature spirit) Nkwe Mbali ("the court of the lion"), who covered the whole kingdom and had a day of the week named after him on which people didn't work. Nkwe Mbali was believed to reside at the Falls of Lefini where his cult was led by the Lipie (the state's high priest) who sacrificed animals sent by the king. The Lipie gave the king a national charm, also called Nkwe Mbali, which was kept in a large shrine. Lion skins symbolised royal power and only the king could sit on one. Squires and lords were obligated to send the king any lion skins found in their domains. The king was expected to sit in the same spot all day with his wives, and wore two feathers symbolising violence and leadership (red and white, nkuo and libobo birds, respectively). Successors to the title underwent an elaborate ritual called lisee which emphasised the king's sacred qualities, through which he was believed to gain mastery over Nkwe Mbali. The "twelve lords of the crown" all had titles associated with lisee; the king wore a collar with twelve lion's teeth (later a brass collar with twelve points), and gave these lords collars. The ikwii (spirits) of deceased monarchs were believed to reside at the Falls.

=== Administration ===
Authority could only be held by members of the king's kin (baamukaana lilimpu, "those of the kindred of authority"), comprising an aristocracy. The kingdom was divided into territories (ntsii), which were delineated by patches of forest (idzwa) and governed by squires/chiefs (ngántsii or mpfõ antsii). A squire's authority was believed to depend on their relationship with their local nkira, which had a dedicated shrine in front of the squire's house. Squires were regarded as "wives" (ie. vassals) of the king, like how these nkira were regarded as "wives" of Nkwe Mbali. They were assisted by a council/court (amieene) composed of heads of the largest houses. Part of the squire's duties was to resolve disputes between villages or houses and ensure harmony. They also collected the king's annual tribute (ingkura) from heads of houses (mpfõ andzo), keeping half for themselves. Lords were effectively squires who received tribute from other squires (who were the lord's nkani) before sending half of it to the king, while high lords also received tribute from other lords. From their introduction c. 1700, (Note: Nkobi may have originated as a familial phenomenon.) rank/status of a lord depended on the prestige of their nkobi, a sacred wooden box secretly containing charms or sacralia, which was linked to an nkira and kept at a shrine. Nkobi had their own origin myths and traditions, and legitimised authority and power. A lord's councillors were called nkula mbali. Friction between lords was common, and they used the forces at their disposal and alliances to other lords to deter conflict and maintain order.

Decision-making was conducted in palavers (ndoo, meaning "words"), which were, depending on the context, courts, councils, or gatherings of kinsmen. Most criminal cases within houses (ndzo) were adjudicated by the mpfõ andzo, and cases between ndzo were attempted to be resolved by the respective mpfõ andzos, village leaders, and squire before going to court (where fines (iã) were paid). Courts were headed by lords or squires, and parties chose an amieene councillor to represent them. Parties entered into huddles (ipfuuna), often followed by sequential offers/claims which iterated towards an agreement. Cases could result in enslavements. Executions were done rarely (dependent on the power of the lord), publicly, and were often unexpected by the criminal.

== Economy ==
Local economies' food systems consisted of arable and pastoral agriculture, fishing, and hunting and gathering. The three types of farming were: large fields in the savannah (ncio) which grew yams (gradually replaced by cassava from the 17th century) and groundnuts and were worked by women; fields created in woodland (ngwuunu) which grew millet (gradually replaced by maize from the 16th/17th century) and tobacco and were worked by men; and back-house groves (ibwo) of trees bearing plantains and bananas, along with various vegetable crops, plant dyes, and medicinal herbs. Food was gifted to women whose harvests failed. Domesticated animals included goats, chickens, and dogs (who assisted in hunting), as well as pigs, pigeons, and ducks nearer Pool Malebo. Most meat came from communal hunts, most often of antelopes. The import of guns allowed hunting of buffalo and elephants. Traps targeted rats, warthogs, and birds such as cranes and guinea fowl. Gathering was important for food, medicine, and construction. Fishing was done with nets, traps, spears, and rods.

Mediums of exchange included Mbula shells (nji), copper ingots (ngiele), lead ingots, and lengths of cloth (ibuunu for imported cloth, ntaa for raphia cloth), which all had rough exchange rates for each other, although bartering was also commonplace. By the late-19th century brass rods (mitako/ngiele) were predominantly used. Trades included smithing, pottery, weaving, wood-working, basket-making, and tattooing. Construction, cooking, and leather-making were more popularly undertaken. Some other occupations included singers and musicians, snake charmers, and medicine men. Weaving was done by men using looms. All iron smelting ceased around the late-18th century in favour of imports. Tio located near rivers produced pottery, which the Tio of the grassland plains imported in exchange for locally-produced raphia cloth. People were usually sold into slavery by their mother's brother if needed, or they sold themselves if unable to pay a fine. They could also be sent as compensation for a murder (mbuma) or captured in war. Slaves served houses and did various tasks. Masters assisted their slaves in finding their own livelihood, and paid for food, housing, and sometimes bridewealth if they were to get married.

=== Trade ===
The Tio participated in an elaborate trade network linking the communities of the Atlantic coast to those along the Congo River, and those along its tributaries north of Pool Malebo. Prior to the arrival of the Portuguese in the 15th century, the Tio likely exported baskets, mats, and pots in exchange for similar goods. By the 16th century, the Tio regularly exported slaves (both criminals and free-men) for a high enough price, such that Ansiku (the Kikongo term for the Tio) became a category of slave in Brazil (although it likely included non-Tio slaves from the same market). Slaves were sold on the presumption that they would be treated the same as the Tio treated their own slaves. In the 17th century there were two trade routes to the Pool; one from Loango where raphia cloth was used as currency, and one from Luanda where nzimbu was used (both were used at the Pool). Goods such as muskets and gunpowder were imported. Caravans from both Loango (led by the Vili) and Luanda (led by Portuguese pombeiros) relied on slave carriers. By the turn of the 18th century the Lower Kasai north of the Pool was being integrated into the long-distance network, resulting in an influx of slaves and ivory.

In the early-19th century, the long-distance trade mainly consisted of slaves in exchange for European imports. From 1840, exports of slaves were rapidly replaced by that of ivory, with the Tio linking suppliers and coastal communities and controlling the ivory trade. Other goods were traded more locally. The three trading centres were located among the Laadi in the west, Ntsei near the Lower Nkeni in the north, and Pool Malebo in the east. Caravans predominated in the dry season, and canoes operated all-year round. The Tio controlled the trading centres near Pool Malebo, namely Mfwa and Mpila (now Brazzaville) and Ntamo and Ntsaasa (now Kinshasa). Iron objects came to be imported from further up the Congo, neutering the local smithing industry. Drums and boats were also imported, as well as unũ (luxury brass objects from Loango), and slaves largely came from the Lower Congo. Goods imported from the coast included European cloths, guns, gunpowder, crockery, mirrors, beads and shells, candles, and brass goods. Goods exported by the Tio of the grassland plains included ivory, groundnuts, slaves, raphia, goats, fowls, buffalo, tobacco, rubber, produce, and baskets.

== Culture and society ==
Terms for kinship groups included ndzo ("house") for matrilineal lineages (usually a common ancestor two generations back from the oldest living member), and ibuuru for bilateral kin (organised by one having two names deriving from matrilineal and patrilineal grandparents, and in the far past commonalities between the sacred forests (idzwa) one's ancestors were thought to be from). People also had a set of foods to avoid (ngili) inherited from their bilateral descent, with non-adherence believed to cause mange. Headed by the oldest male (mpfõ andzo, "chief of the house"), ndzo could split up if too big, formalised by two parties holding a banana leaf which would then be cut by the local chief and validated by diviners. Concerns surrounded members bewitching one another, which often started feuds, the threat of which fostered functionality of the unit. Accusations of witchcraft were adjudicated by poison trials (nkei). Seniors were called taara and tooke, for men and women respectfully, which was also used to refer to the king. The ideal state of being was ngolo, where one is very fortunate and stress-free. Members of opposite sexes and of the same generation, and grandmothers and grandchildren, formed joking relationships.

Settlements comprised the kin of its leader or founder (wookuru, the headman), and their populations (ula) numbered under 500. The wookuru could formalise their position by obtaining an ibili charm made by the state's high priest (Lipie). Villages centred on a courtyard by the headman's house, larger settlements being divided into wards. Chiefs had more wives and therefore more kin, leading to bigger settlements, however when leaders died either someone younger would manage to keep some of it together or it would break up and people would found new settlements. Lifestyles differed depending on whether the settlement was on a river or the grassland plains, and the most common occupations for men were trading and fishing. Water was scarce on the sparsely populated plateau due to the terrain and lack of rivers there, which the Tio solved by using eaves to direct rainwater into large pots. The plateau was also absent of mosquitos, meaning malaria and sleeping sickness was rare there. However this was not the case for Tio living along the Congo channel near Malebo Pool. Trade was dependent on weather, as caravans were hampered by winds and high water. At the Pool hippopotami were hunted. It was believed the king had the power to command lions, which were feared and respected in Tio society.

Women married when aged 15–17, while men married when 30–35, and a bridewealth was paid (reimbursed after divorce or death). Men had choice over which village to live at, and residence was mostly patrilocal. Families were polygynous, although few had more than two wives other than the king. Women worked on plantations together, fostering strong female solidarity, while, according to one of Jan Vansina's informants, men did "nothing". According to Vansina, harems became common for men of high status after c. 1700, reducing women's status and influence in society. There were four days in a week, two of which forbade agricultural work. Scarification (ãncuo) was carried out at the age of 2. The royal smith (Ngambiõ) was one of the highest chiefs in the country, and smiths were hereditary and generally had high status. Preparing food and cooking was done by women. Social status was conferred by the amount of raphia cloth worn. Sports included wrestling and a hockey-like game (kuli). Dances most often accompanied by drums occurred in the evening around a full moon. Other pastimes included storytelling for children (nkõ) and recounting proverbs. Itinerant troubadours were called ndziõ and performed at festivities, prized for their unaccompanied singing. Funerals were seen to encapsulate someone's life, so were often elaborate, unique, and tailored to the recently deceased.

=== Religious practices ===
The creator god in Tio religion was Nzã, who was the first nature spirit (nkira) and the first cause, though there was no defined system of beliefs. Some nkira had the same domain as polities. The Lipie led the cult of Nkwe Mbali (the national nkira, for which one day a week was dedicated) at Mba at the Falls of the Lefini, and he made ibili charms from objects washed up at the sacred falls. Olfert Dapper's 17th-century account said that the Sun was the Tio's high god/nkira, which was no longer the case in the 19th century. Ikwii (spirits of deceased ancestors one had known, therefore more important for those older) were believed to be guardians of the living, who they protected from witchcraft, and were honoured, appeased, and consulted at shrines (kio). Though not usually communicating directly with ikwii, an angkira ritual was initiated when a woman had a dream involving a deceased ancestor (usually the grandmother), whose okwii was appeased by a ceremony lasting 9 days. Another ritual was okuu, based on suspicions of witchcraft and initiated when someone fell ill, and involved the mpfõ andzo leading a hunt to gauge the ikwii's attitudes. Quarrels and negative feelings were later voiced at the inquest, and its main function was to resolve disputes. Rituals were often accompanied by a pluriarc; the instrument and its melodies were believed to be favoured by ancestors.

People were believed to be imbued with two life forces (mpiini), one from each parent. At birth they were given an object by their father, usually a copper arm ring, which was believed to link the person's vitality to that of a specific unknown animal (sometimes revealed at death by a nearby animal's behaviour). The mpiini given by the mother tended to be the umbilical cord, or a ring. Evil was believed to be caused by spirits called apfu, and illness and death caused by witchcraft which was undertaken by disguised witches (ngeiloolo). They were thought to exploit friction between kin in order to frame one party. Powerful figures were associated with witchcraft, and the king was believed to have killed 12 people with it to come to rule, being seen as the "epitome of witchcraft". Accused witches (only men) undertook poison trials, which were weaponised by political rivals. There were various types of diviner (ngda vaa), differentiated by their methods. (Note: Following the client presenting their situation, these included: the diviner throwing small seeds into water showing their reflection, with the effects of this said to give insight into the cause of illness; rubbing a drug called mpiaara together with chewed pimento and peanuts while naming suspects and asking questions, where hands crossing indicated a positive answer; using a bag of jackal skin the diviner entered a trance during which they mentioned names; dreaming; and consultation of a charm called kaa. The most prestigious diviners were vaa mbulu, who could be men or women, and were believed to have been more in touch with Obu waalua, a powerful spirit located underground.) They were responsible for healing, divining, and accusing, making them powerful and highly influential. Healers (ngàà waa libuu) were more common, and healing wasn't limited just to diviners. Some specialised in certain illnesses or remedies, knowledge usually learnt from family members. Remedies included drugs (imiõ), recovery charms (kaa), protective charms (inkiele), and fortune charms (osel’beene). The term ngaa referred to diviners, healers, and rainmakers.

== Military ==
The king relied on the armies of his lords, which consisted of people from their settlements and slaves, as well as forces belonging to the lords' nkani (vassal squires or lesser lords). Parties to war gained allies by paying village headmen to mobilise men from their settlements, similar to mercenaries. Armies would only march when they deemed their numbers sufficient. Bows and arrows were gradually replaced by firearms from the 16th century.

Internal wars usually developed out of feuds between groups. Feuds consisted of ambushes, whereas war consisted of conflict between large groups led by squires or lords. Restrained conflicts (mvulu ondil antsii) were between villages of a single domain, essentially a collective duel which the squire would then judge. Unrestrained wars tended to involve lords and the king. Feuds often originated as disputes over bridewealth (litsũ), accusations of witchcraft, or a runaway slave, while wars were usually between competing chiefs. Tio concepts of war differed from European ones; advantages were rarely pressed, and damage was limited to avert suffering similar attacks, with campaigns serving as demonstrations of power.

== List of kings ==
The following is a list of kings documented by Jan Vansina. He mentions two names, "Ngeileelie" and "Ngoolua", who may have ruled in between Pieele and Iloo I. Names and dates after Iloo II are derived from news reports.

Ruler	Reign	Notes
...	...	...
Ngantso	c. 1800	Same time as Nzã Mbã
Opontaba	?–(1810–1820)	Likely grandfather of Ngeiliino Opontaba and Iloo
Ncu acumpfiri	?	-
Pieele	?	Possible father of Iloo
Iloo I	(1865–75)–1892	Last sovereign
Mbandieele	1892–1899	-
Ikukuri	1899–1907	-
Ngaayüo	1907–1918	-
Vacant	1918–1928	Ngalifourou ruled as chef de canton
Mundzwaani	1928–1930	-
Ngamvaala	1930–1931	-
Andibi	1931–1934	-
Ngankia Mbandieele	1934–1939	-
Nkima	1939–1947	-
Ntsaalu	1947–1964	-
Iloo II	1964–1971	-
Dissolved	-	-
Pierre Mialami Wawa	1991–1998	-
Gaston Ngouayoulou	1998–2004	-
Auguste Nguempio	2004–2021	-
Michel Ganari Nsalou II	2021–present	-

== See also ==
- History of the Republic of the Congo
- Kingdom of Kongo
