= Iloo I =

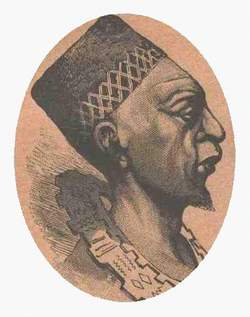

Iloo I (also known as Illoy or Mboulignaoh Illoh), Makoko de Mbé, was the chief of the Teke tribe of Mbé and the king of the Téké people from 1874 to his death in 1892. The tribe was found in what is now Gabon, Republic of Congo, and the Democratic Republic of Congo. Makoko, Onkô ou Ma-Onkô is the title given to the leader, most commonly the patriarch. Iloo Mboulignaoh became king upon the death of King Ngantho in 1874, after being elected to head the Teke Kingdom. In 1879, he married 15-year-old Ngalifourou.

In 1880, the Makoko de Mbé placed his kingdom under the royal protection of France by signing a treaty with Pierre Savorgnan de Brazza. The Makoko, incentivized by the commercial opportunities that the treaty would be and the possibility of weakening his rivals, signed the treaty on a French territory on the right of the Congo River; the place would later be known as Brazzaville, currently the capital of the Republic of Congo. After a year the chief of the tribes on the west bank of the river, Ngaliema, signed a treaty with Henry Morton Stanley, no longer considering himself a subject of Makoko de Mbé. Thus, the right bank of the river was placed under the protection of the International African Association.

Ngalifourou, his wife, ascended to the throne after his death in 1892.
