= Tireli =

Tireli may refer to:

- Tireli, Mali, a village in Dogon County, Mali
- Nansi Tireli (born 1965), Croatian politician and entrepreneur
