= Charles de Chavannes =

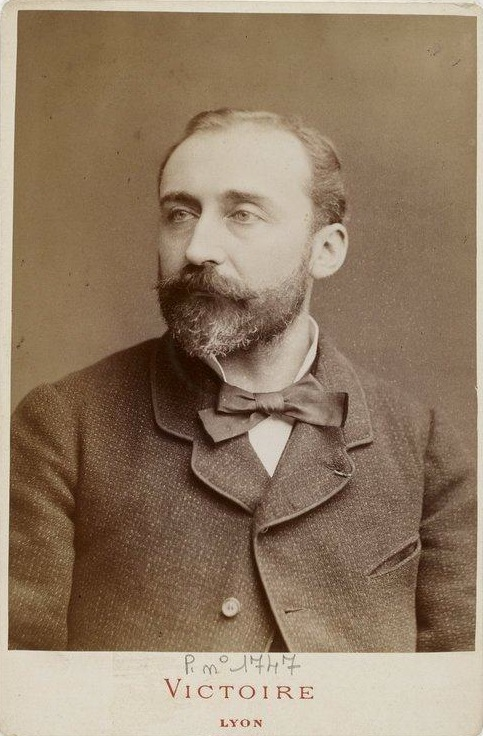
Charles de Chavannes

Fortuné Charles de Chavannes, born 19 May 1853 in Lyon and died 7 February 1940 in Antibes, was a French colonial administrator. He accompanied Pierre Savorgnan de Brazza on the Mission de l'Ouest africain from 1883 to 1886, and participated in the exploration and establishment of French Congo.

He authored several books about French colonial history in Equatorial Africa.

== Life ==
He studied law at the University of Lyon and became a lawyer in 1877. In March 1883 he became the private secretary of Pierre Savorgnan de Brazza and accompanied him to Africa. With Malamine Camara he participated in the founding of Brazzaville of which he was the first European resident. Living in Bas-Congo and Niaré (1886–1889), he was named lieutenant governor of Gabon in Libreville in March 1889 following the departure of Noël Ballay.

As France's plenipotentiary minister and technical delegate to the Brussels Commission (1890), in 1891 he received the title of Colonial Delegate to the Trans-Sahara Commission and to the Franco-Spanish Border Commission. He returned, ailing, to France in 1894. His friend Albert Dolisie succeeded him.

In 1897, he was named an honorary governor.

== Publications ==
- Deltas de l'Alima, de la Shanga et confluent de l'Oubangui, réduction des levés originaux au 20000e (1885)
- Exposé sommaire de voyage dans l'Ouest-Africain (1886)
- Le bois d'Okoumé (1930)
- Pour le cinquantenaire de Brazzaville (1931)
- Un collaborateur de Brazza, Albert Dolisie (1932)
- Note sur la fondation de Brazzaville en 1884 (1935)
- Souvenirs de la mission de l'Ouest-Africain (avec Brazza, 1936–1937
- Le Congo français: Ma collaboration avec Brazza (1937)
- Les origines de l'Afrique Équatoriale française (1941)

== Awards ==
- Membre libre, Académie des sciences d'outre-mer (1894)
- Officier d'académie (1884)
- Legion of Honor: chevalier (1885), officier (1893), commandeur for role as honorary colonial governor (1932)
- Médaille coloniale avec agrafes Or et Gabon du Congo (1907)

== Bibliography ==
- Numa Broc, Dictionnaire des Explorateurs français du XIXe siècle, T.1, Afrique, CTHS, 1988, p. 74
- Charles de Chavannes, Avec Brazza : Souvenirs de la Mission de l’Ouest Africaine (mars 1883 – janvier 1886), Plon, 1935.
- Philippe Moukoko, Dictionnaire général du Congo-Brazzaville, L'Harmattan, 1999, p. 79-80
- Patrice Morlat, Les grands commis de l'empire colonial français, Indes Savantes, 2010, p. 84
