= Ngabe (disambiguation) =

The Ngäbe are an Indigenous people of Panama and Costa Rica.

Ngabe may also refer to:

- Ngabe District, a district of the Republic of the Congo
- Ngäbe-Buglé Comarca, a comarca in Panama, home to the Ngäbe and others
- Ngäbere, the language of the Ngäbe people
