= Palaver (custom) =

Custom of meeting

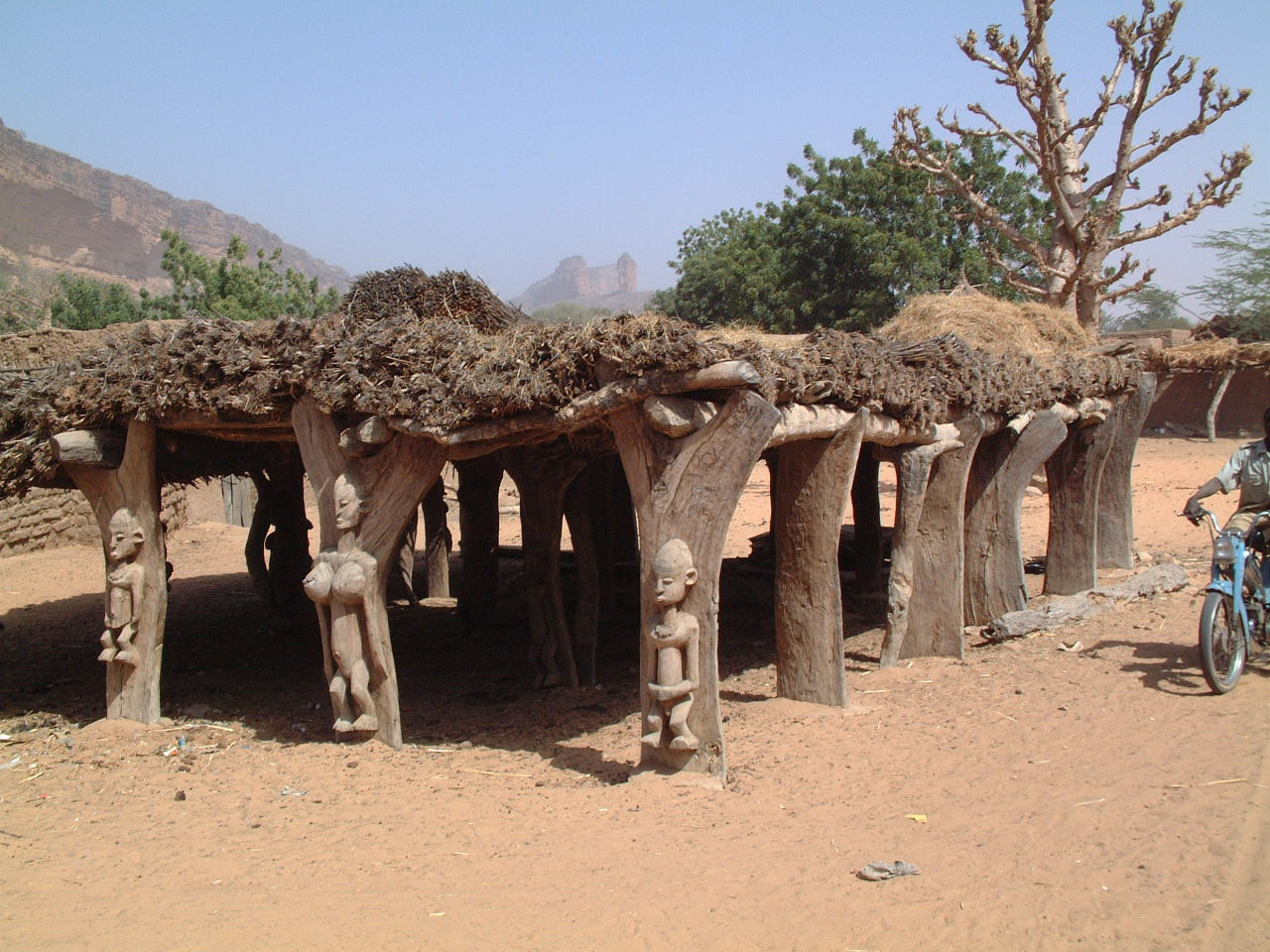
The Toguna of the village of Endé in 'Pays Dogon'

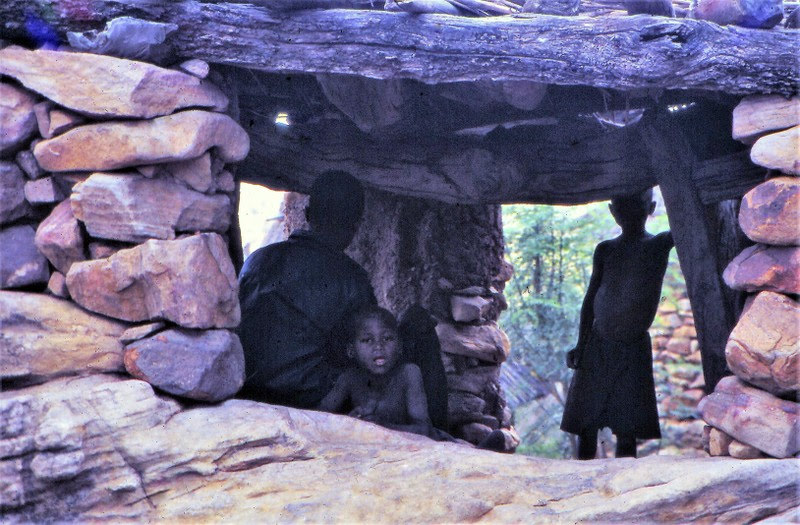
The men's house (Toguna), also just a resting place, Tireli, Mali, 1980.

In Africa, the palaver is a custom of meeting, and of creating or maintaining social links. It is an egalitarian institution in which all or part of a village community participates. This custom also makes it possible to settle a dispute without violence. In many cases, a village has a traditional house or other place dedicated to the palaver ("palaver hut", "palaver tree", etc.).

== Dedicated places ==
Depending on the region, the palaver can be held under the palaver tree, generally a baobab tree, or in a special building reserved for this purpose. This is the case of the Toguna (variable spelling: togouna, to'guna), in Dogon Country, Mali, a low-roofed structure reserved for men, built that way so that no one can stand up and try to take the upper hand in a fight. In his autobiography, Nelson Mandela, who was born in Transkei to a Xhosa family, cites the tribal meetings that were held regularly at the Great Mansion. With the Baoulé, depending on the circumstances, meetings may be held under the "apatame" (traditional "arbor") of the village chief, usually located in front of his house, but the chief may also go to the house himself. According to Godefroy Bidima in his book entitled "La palabre. Une juridiction de la parole" (1997), among the Fangs and the Bulu of Central Africa, the palaver takes place within a guardhouse called Aba. In the past, the Aba was considered the House of Men and was the place par excellence for public debate.

In Liberia, it is a very common form of local conflict resolution. Most villages have a palaver hall for this purpose.

Palavers (ndoo in Tio) were the main form of conflict resolution in the pre-colonial Tio Kingdom, located in present-day Republic of Congo.
