= Mpe Bambou =

Village in Republic of the Congo

Mpe Bambou is a small village situated in the Plateaux Department (Congo) which is in the north of the Republic of Congo. It lies in the Lefini River, north of Moembe and around 200 kilometres north of Brazzaville on the N2 road.

== Population ==
It has a population of 200. The village's activities include agriculture, hunting and fishing.

== Transport ==
The village's transport includes trucks, minibuses, small boats and taxis.
