= Teke people =

Bantu ethnic group in Central Africa

Bateke
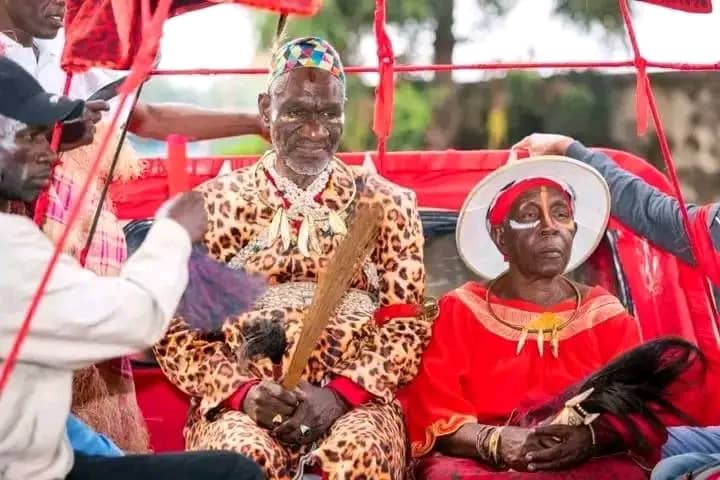
- Current Õkoo (King) of the Teke Michael Ganari Nsalou II and Queen Ngalifourou

Total population
- ~1,000,000

Regions with significant populations
- Republic of the Congo: 569,400
- Democratic Republic of the Congo: 226,000
- Gabon: 213,000

Languages
- Teke languages, French, Lingala

Religion
- Christianity, Traditional African religions

Related ethnic groups
- Kongo people, Yanzi people, Bantu peoples

Teke
- Person: MôTeke
- People: BaTéké
- Language: Teke languages
- Country: Tio Kingdom

The Teke people or Bateke, also known as the Tyo or Tio, are a Bantu Central African ethnic group (specifically the North Western Bantu) that speak the Teke languages and that mainly inhabit the south, north, and center of the Republic of the Congo, the west of the Democratic Republic of the Congo, with a minority in the south-east of Gabon. Omar Bongo, who was President of Gabon in the late 20th century, was a Teke.

== History ==
As part of the Bantu expansion, the Teke established a powerful kingdom in what is now the Republic of Congo in the first millennium C.E. with religion as the basis of legitimacy. They had a king called the Makoko, who ruled the Teke from the surrounding area of modern day Brazzaville. He is thought of as both divine and human, and he rules over all the local chiefs.

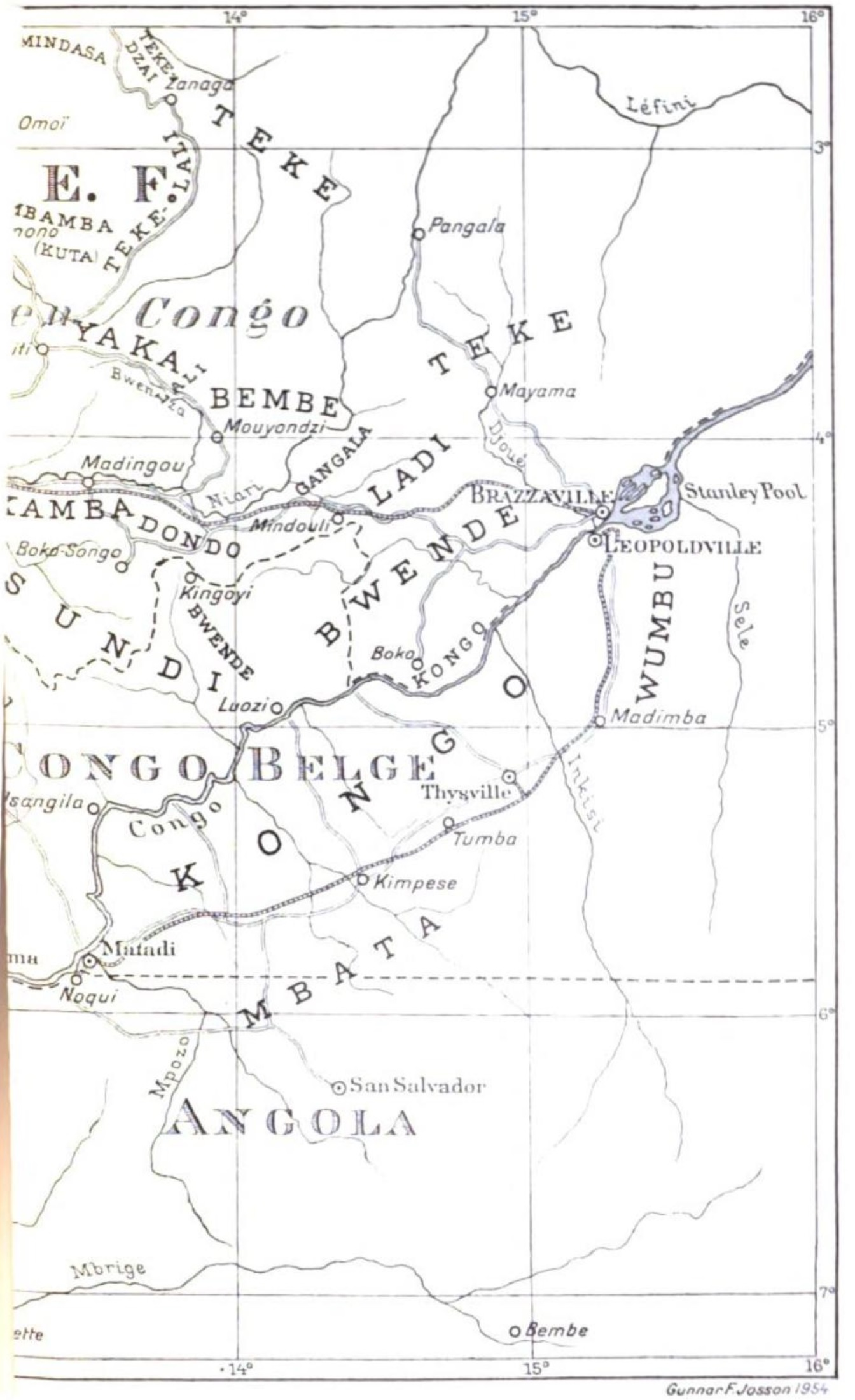
Map showing teke and other ethnic groups in Lower Congo.

The Teke Kingdom flourished around the 12th and 13th centuries, but by the 15th had become a vassal of the Kingdom of Kongo and faced encroachment on their frontiers by numerous other peoples. Initially occupying the area between Manyanga and the Malebo Pool, the Teke were gradually pushed north by Kongolese raids and emigration, itself a product of the violence of the Atlantic slave trade, into the Batéké Plateau.

The French first arrived in what is now the Republic of Congo in the 1880s, and occupied the Congo until 1960. During this colonial period, traditional Teke ceremonies were very few. Under the French, the Teke people suffered heavily from colonial exploitation. The French government was gathering land for its own use and damaging traditional economies, including massive displacement of people. The Teke Kingdom signed a treaty with the French in 1883 that gave the French land in return for protection. Pierre Savorgnan de Brazza oversaw French interests. A small settlement along the Congo River was renamed Brazzaville and eventually became the federal capital of French Equatorial Africa. In the 1960s the Teke people started to regain their independence and traditional life started to flourish once again.

== Ethnography and traditions ==
The name of the tribe shows what the occupation of the tribe was: trading. The word teke means 'to sell'. The economy of the Teke is mainly based on farming maize, millet, tobacco, and bananas but the Teke are also hunters, skilled fishermen and traders. The Teke lived in an area across Republic of Congo, the Democratic Republic of the Congo, and Gabon. The mfumu was the head of the family and his prestige grew as family members increased. The Teke sometimes chose blacksmiths as chiefs. The blacksmiths were important in the community and this occupation was passed down from father to son. In terms of life of the Teke, the village chief was chosen as religious leader, he was the most important tribal member and he would keep all the potions and spiritual bones that would be used in traditional ceremonies to speak to the spirits and rule safety over his people.The Teke people also practice scarification. These scars are located mainly on the face and span from the temple down the cheek. These scars are given to them as young children.

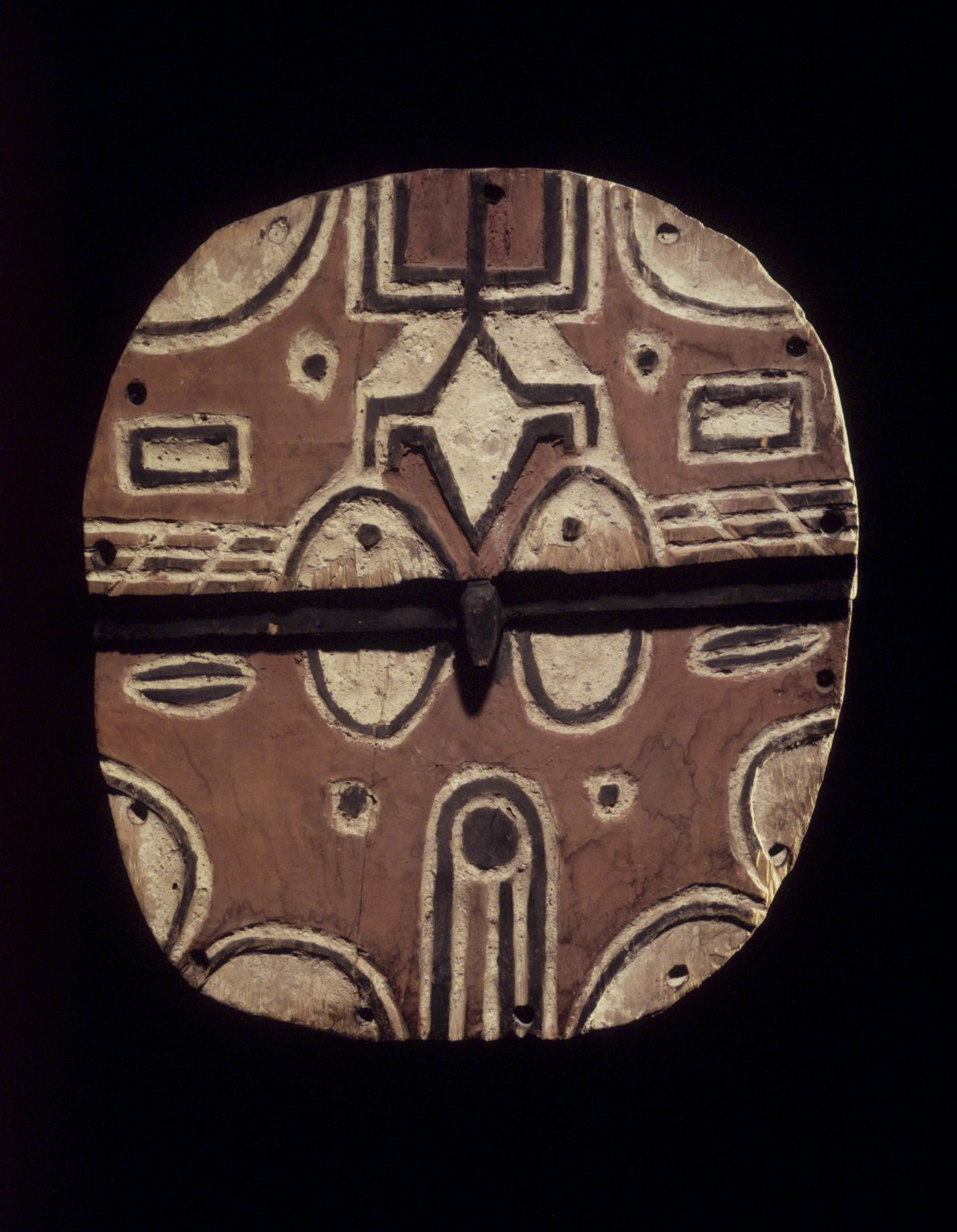
Teke Mask, Brooklyn Museum.

Teke masks are mainly used in traditional dancing ceremonies such as wedding, funeral, and initiation ceremonies of young men entering adult hood. The mask is also used as a social and political identifier of social structure within a tribe or family.

=== Religion ===
The Teke people are monotheistic and believe in Nzambi their supreme deity. He is said to have created everything including the earth, water, and sky. He also has control over life and death. He is also not directly praised. Nzambi is seen as too far above humans to interfere in their affairs. The elder who is the village's religious leader is called the Mpugu. His power is marked by a large wooden figure known as Tara-Mantsie (father of the earth) which allows his powers to affect all the villagers. Unlike the Tara-Mantsie, the normal figurative statues can only affect a single person.The Teke also believe in ancestor and nature spirits that act as intermediaries between Nzambi and the living. These spirits inhabit both living and nonliving things. They can be both complimented and offended, and are given anthropomorphic properties, which can affect whether the spirit is kind or aggressive. Of these spirits, Nkwimbali is the most relevant and important. Nkwimbali resides in waterfalls and is often given sacrifices. They also believe all living things have both a soul and breath of life. When a living things dies, the soul is freed and became a spirit and the breath of life is passed to give life to a new thing.

The Teke religion has both the Ancestor Cult and the Cult of Spirits. The Ancestor Cult has their own funerary rites and believes in maintaining and caring for the deceased ancestors. This is done through maintaining the place near the village where the deceased ancestors inhabit after death, which can be a variety of places like caves, clearing, or waterfalls near the edge of villages, and providing offerings like food or sacrifices. When dissatisfied, they will punish the living family members by making their livestock sick or driving them mad. The Cult of Spirits meets in temples, unlike the Ancestor Cult, and has special huts near by which hold statues of the spirits and is where sacrifices take place. The sacrifices the Cult of Spirits practice were once human sacrifices, but by the 19th century this was quickly changed to animal sacrifice. This cult also have to keep the spirits happy and satisfied through offerings and sacrifices or they risk medicines and Bilongo to stop working.

=== Teke Art ===
The Teke people are well known for their masks, which are round flat disk-like wooden masks that have abstract patterns and geometric motifs with horizontal line that divides the mask in two. They are painted in earthly colors: mainly dark blues, blacks, browns, and clays tones. The traditional Teke masks all have triangle shaped noses. The bottom of the eyes don't line up with the top half of the eyes, which gives the eyes the illusion of protruding forward. The masks have narrow eye slits to enable the masker to see without being seen. They have holes pierced along the edge for the attachment of a woven raffia dress with feathers and fibers. The mask is held in place with a bite bar at the back that the wearer holds in his teeth. The raffia, fabric, and feather dress would add to the mask's costume and conceal the wearer. The masks originate from the upper Ogowe region.

The Teke people have a variety of wooden figurative statues or nkisi each containing Bilongo (fetish/medicinal materials) which serve a variety of purposes, some of these statues are called Mutinu Bmamba, Matomba, Butti, and Iteo. All of the statues have a basic human form to them with elbows and knees being slightly bent with a large head. The faces are abstracted with thin round eyes (like a slightly more naturalistic version of the eyes on their masks), small mouths, and long rectangular or triangular noses. Most of them also have elongated necks that match the cylindrical form of the body.

The Bilongo each nkisi has serve a variety of purposes. The Butti figures represent ancestors, and have material from the ancestor embedded within the figure, which can include things like hair or finger nails. These figures get their own special hut at the edge of each village where all village ancestor statues or Butti are kept. To mark the prestige of each ancestor, the Teke decorate them with metal necklaces. Mutinu Bmamba figures help women with pregnancy, and the Bilongo is wrapped tightly around the body and arms of the figure making a thick crust. Matomba figures have Bilongo that is packed thick around the body and arms rounding this part of the figure, and the Bilongo serves as a charm to protect against bad luck and negative spirits. Iteo figures have Bilongo packed on extremely thick encasing the entire body, except for the head and legs, and is shaped like a cone with the point where the legs are revealed. The Bilongo is also covered in a layer of white clay and called Bonga. These figures symbolize happiness and the spirit of happiness.

Textiles serve an important role in Teke funeral. They make the textiles out of raffia and sometimes dye them to add color. When the dead are placed into their tombs, they are accompanied by 3 textiles. These textiles are rolled up before being placed beside the dead. They serve as maps that guide the recently buried to the village of the dead so they can join the ancestors. The 3 textiles each represent maps with one for the sky, earth, and water.

== Notable Bateke and notable people associated with the Bateke ==
- Omar Bongo (1935–2009), President of Gabon
- Patience Dabany, First Lady of Gabon (1967–1987)
- Ali Bongo Ondimba, President of Gabon (2009–2023)
- Brice Clotaire Oligui Nguema, Interim President of Gabon (2023–)
- Charles David Ganao (1928–2012), Prime Minister of the Republic of Congo (1996–1997)
- Ngalifourou (1864–1956), a queen of the Teke

== Bateke dogs and cats ==
The Teke historically breed dogs and cats for domestic purposes. The chien Bateke is a small lean hunting dog with a short, medium gray coat. The chat Bateke is large cat with nearly the same coloring as the dog. These animals constitute landraces, rather than formal breeds (they are not recognized by any major fancier and breeder organizations). A majority of domesticated cats and dogs in areas bordering the Congo River are of these breeds, though ownership of domesticated animals in general is rare in the region.

== See also ==
- Anziku Kingdom
