= Félicien Challaye =

French philosopher, anti-colonialist and human rights activist

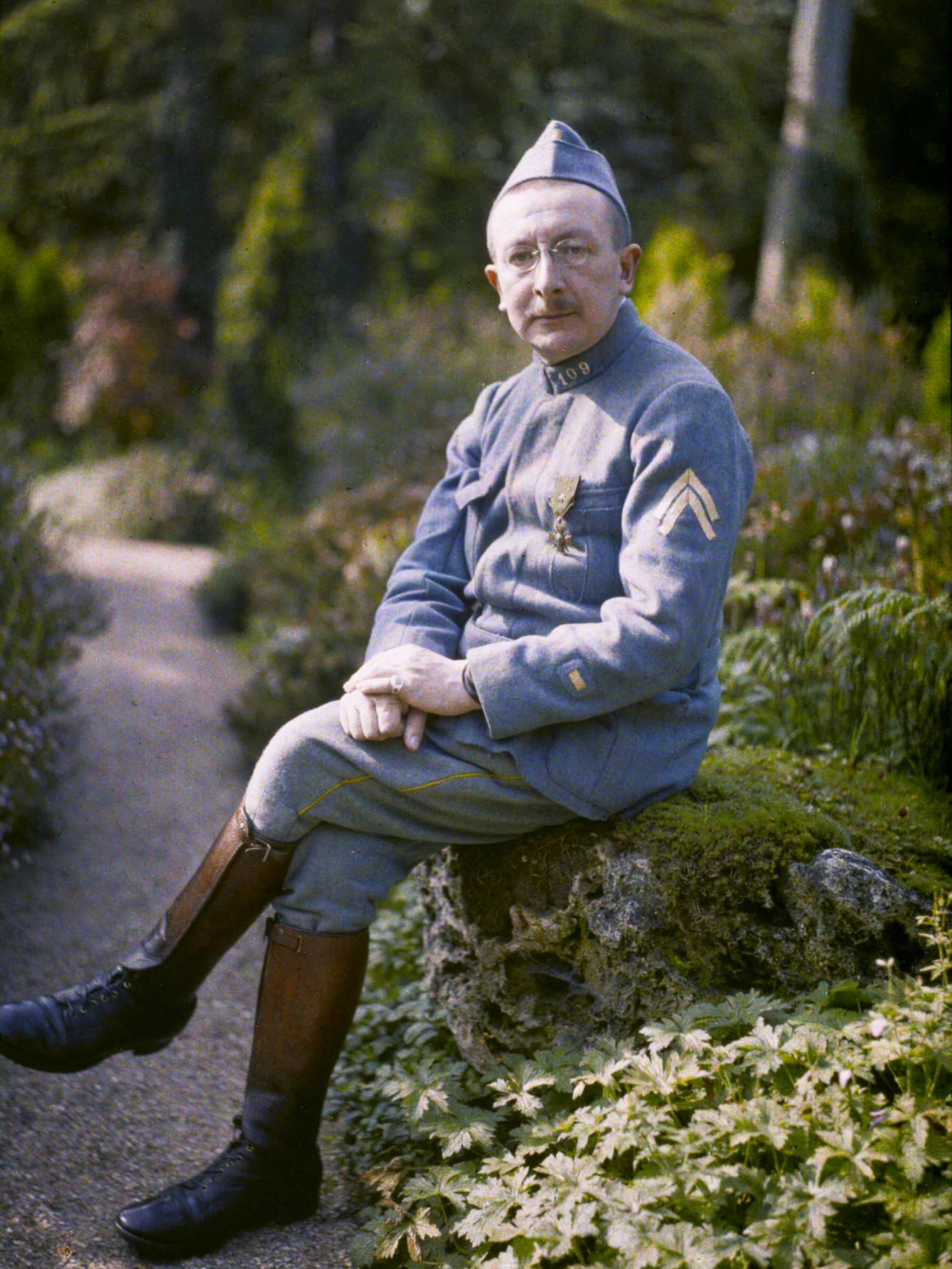
- Autochrome portrait by Auguste Léon, 1916
- Born: 1 November 1875; Lyon, France
- Died: 26 April 1967 (aged 91); Paris, France
- Occupation: Philosopher

Félicien Robert Challaye (1 November 1875 – 26 April 1967) was a French philosopher, anti-colonialist and human rights activist.

== Early life ==
Félicien Challaye was born on 1 November 1875 in Lyon, France. He earned the agrégation in Philosophy in 1897.

== Career ==
Challaye was a high school teacher of philosophy in Paris from 1903 to 1937. He served as Pierre Savorgnan de Brazza's secretary on his 1905 trip to the Congo. Three years later, in 1908, he founded a human rights organization for the indigenous people of the Congo. He subsequently served as the vice president of the Human Rights League.

Challaye served in World War I, and he was wounded in combat in 1915. After the war, he became a staunch pacifist. By 1931, he suggested he preferred peace to war, even if France had to be invaded by Germany.

Challaye was the author of many books on philosophy. He also published children's books under the pseudonym of Robert Fougère.

== Death and legacy ==
Challaye died on 26 April 1967 in Paris, France. The rue Félicien Challaye in Tunis, Tunisia was named in his honor.

== See also ==
- List of peace activists

== Works ==
- Challaye, Félicien (1905). Au Japon et en Extrême-Orient. Le Japon moderne. Lafcadio Hearn. Un conte japonais. Vladivostock. Journal d'un expulsé. Une excursion au pays des Moÿs. De Batavia à Tosari. L'Indi. Quelques hommes et quelques villes. Paris: Armand Colin. OCLC 11978052.
- Challaye, Félicien; Mille, Pierre (1906). Les deux Congo devant la Belgique et devant la France. Paris: Cahiers de la Quinzaine. OCLC 10548034.
- Challaye, Félicien (1909). Le Congo français. La question internationale du Congo. Paris: F. Alcan. OCLC 3219912.
- Challaye, Félicien (1915). Le Japon illustré. Paris: Larousse. OCLC 7601224.
- Challaye, Félicien (1922). Les principes généraux de la Science et de la Morale. Paris: Nathan. OCLC 491203882.
- Challaye, Félicien (1925). Psychologie et métaphysique. Paris: F. Nathan. OCLC 23410526.
- Challaye, Félicien (1927). Le Cœur japonais. Paris: Payot. OCLC 28746225.
- Challaye, Félicien; Reynier, Marguerite (1929). Cours de droit privé et d'économie politique à l'usage des écoles primaires supérieures. Paris: F. Alcan. OCLC 457803778.
- Challaye, Félicien (1929). L'art et la beauté. Paris: F. Nathan. OCLC 11895581.
- Challaye, Félicien (1931). Contes et légendes du Japon. Paris: F. Nathan. OCLC 10762458.
- Challaye, Félicien (1933). Nietzsche. Paris: Mellottée. OCLC 5527054.
- Challaye, Félicien (1934). Esthétique. Paris: Nathan. OCLC 42384524.
- Challaye, Félicien (1937). La Crise de la Ligue des droits de l'homme. Paris: Imprimerie du Palais. OCLC 459177962.
- Challaye, Félicien; Dugas, Ludovic; Dumas, Georges (1938). La logique des sentiments : les passions. Paris: F. Alcan. OCLC 492075499.
- Challaye, Félicien (1940). Petite Histoire des Grandes Religions. Paris: Presses universitaires de France. OCLC 6177310.
- Challaye, Félicien (1943). La Psychologie de l'Enfant. Paris: PUF. OCLC 65808584.
- Challaye, Félicien (1947). Bergson. Paris: Mellottée. OCLC 893687670.
- Challaye, Félicien (1948). Freud. Paris: Editions Mellotee. OCLC 301483195.
- Challaye, Félicien (1948). Petite histoire des grandes philosophies. Paris: Presses Universitaires de France. OCLC 17016348.
- Challaye, Félicien (1954). Péguy socialiste. Paris: Amiot. OCLC 294540.
- Challaye, Félicien (1956). Les Philosophes de l'Inde. Paris: Presses universitaires de France. OCLC 6745332.
