= Patience Dabany =

Gabonese singer and musician

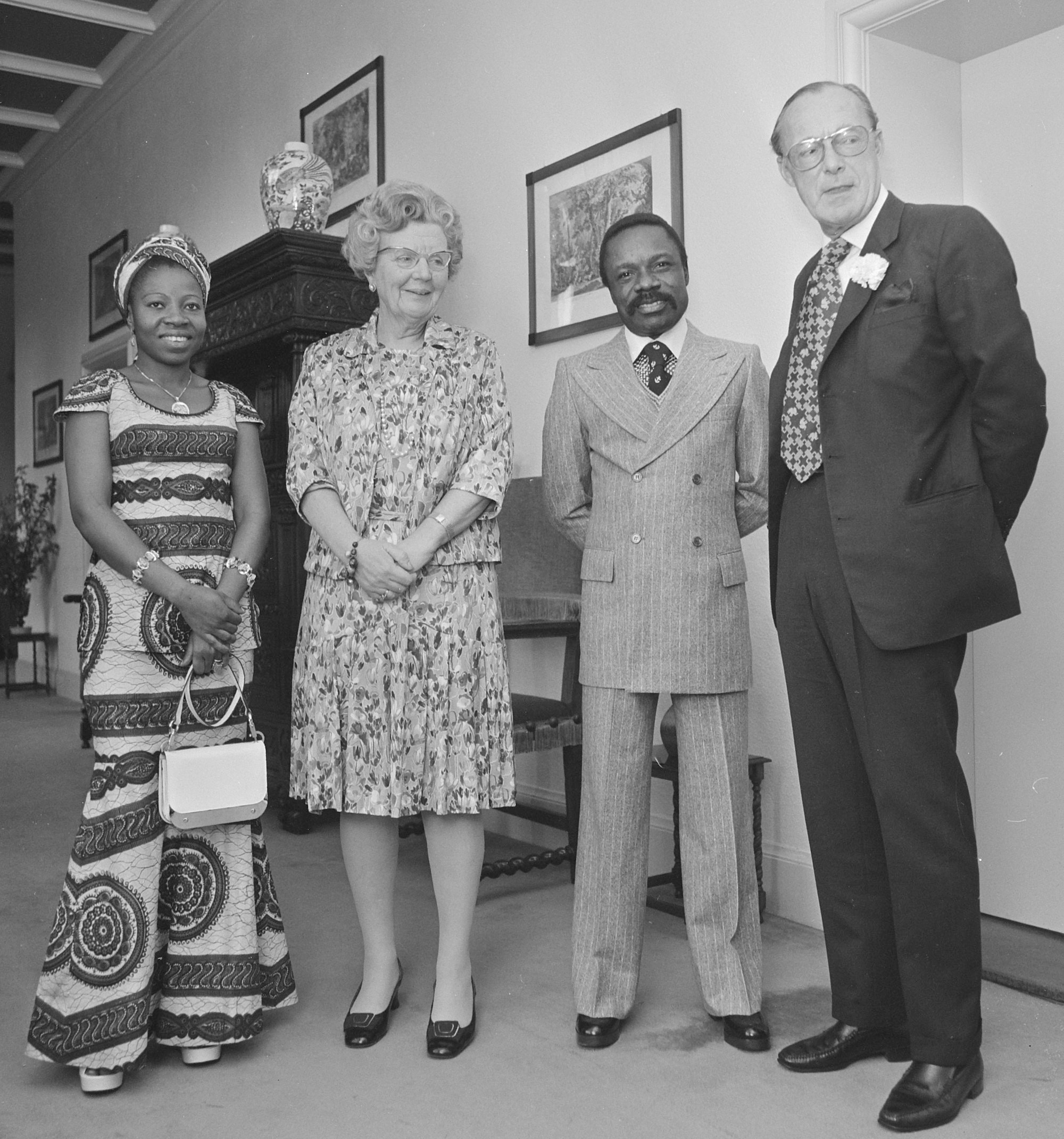
- From left to right: Josephine Bongo, Queen Juliana, Omar Bongo, Prince Bernhard in 1973

First Lady of Gabon
- In role 27 November 1967 – 1987
- President: Omar Bongo
- Preceded by: Pauline M'ba
- Succeeded by: Edith Lucie Bongo (1989)

Personal details
- Born: Marie-Joséphine Kama; 22 January 1941 (age 85) Brazzaville, French Congo, French Equatorial Africa
- Spouse: Omar Bongo (m. 1959; div. 1987)

Patience Dabany (born Marie-Joséphine Kama; 22 January 1941), also known as Joséphine Bongo, is a Gabonese singer and musician who was the First Lady of Gabon from 1967 to 1987 as the first wife of president Omar Bongo. After their divorce, she pursued a career in music. She is the mother of the former president of Gabon, Ali Bongo.

== Early life ==
Born as Marie-Joséphine Kama in Brazzaville, Congo, Dabany's parents originated from the Bateke people in Haut-Ogooué region in what is now southeastern Gabon. Dabany grew up in a musical family and began to sing at an early age to her father's accordion accompaniment, while her brother played guitar. From there her path led to the church choir in Brazzaville and on to traditional song performances. Her mother was a traditional singer.

== As First Lady ==
In 1958, she met Albert-Bernard Bongo, a young Gabonese student. At just 18 years of age, she married Albert on 31 October 1959. They had two children: a son Alain Bernard Bongo (9 February 1959) and a daughter, the late Albertine Amissa Bongo (1964–1993).

Marie Josephine Kama, later known as Josephine Bongo, was the First Lady of Gabon. She and her then-husband founded the Gabonese Democratic Party. She became involved in many social projects, including the promotion of women's rights, charities for children, etc. Working with culture she created the musical group dedicated to the Gabonese Democratic Party, Kounabeli (Superstars), where she performed as lead singer.

== Musical career ==
In 1986 Joséphine and Albert Bongo divorced. Marie embarked on a career as a professional artist, under her new name, Patience Dabany, following in the footsteps of her son (and eventual President of Gabon) Alain, who released a funk record named A Brand New Man in 1977. Her first album was Levekisha. Other albums followed such as Cheri Ton Disque Est Rayé and Associé. Her acclaimed self titled album, Patience Dabany, in 1994 was produced and mixed by Grammy winning engineer Reggie Dozier and background vocals were sung by Los Angeles based vocal trio, HARMONY, consisting of Cydney Davis, Wendy Smith and Theresa Walker who also toured with Patience during her concerts in Gabon and in California. In 1997, she released the album Nouvelle Attitude. The same year Dabany returned to her motherland and reestablished herself in Libreville. In 2001 she released Article 106. Her 2004 world music album Obomiyia allowed her to tour with James Brown in Europe. She recorded an album with Kounabeli in 2005; the song La Connaissance from this album was one of the anthems of her former husband (now using the name Omar Bongo Ondimba) used during the presidential campaign of 2005.

Patience Dabany collaborated with many artists such as El DeBarge, Tabu Ley Rochereau, and Tshala Muana. She is also the president of the Association of Gabonese Merchants and works in the field of charity.

Dabany performed at Paris Olympia in 2001, and in the "Great African Night" at the Stade de France in June 2011. She also sang at the final of the 2012 African Nations Cup in Libreville. On 2 November 2012, she hosted a concert at the Zenith in Paris. Dabany is one of the most prolific musical ambassadors of Africa.

In December 2023, the attorney general of Libreville announced legal proceedings against Dabany for "insulting remarks", after she criticized her nephew and interim president of Gabon Brice Oligui Nguema.

== Honours ==
- Member of the Order of Gabriela Silang (Philippines)
