= Ngalifourou =

- Waafitieere

Queen consort of Tio
- Tenure: 1880 – 1892

Queen mother of Tio
- Tenure: 1892 – 1956

Canton Chief (Chef de canton) of Tio
- Reign: 1918 – 1956
- Kings: See list: Vacant (until 1928); Mundzwaani (1928–1930); Ngamvaala (1930–1931); Andibi (1931–1934); Ngankia Mbandieele (1934–1939); Nkima (1939–1947); Ntsaalu (since 1947)
- Born: 1864; Ngabé
- Died: 8 June 1956 (aged 91–92); Ngabé
- Spouse: Iloo I (m. 1880; died 1892)
- House: Mbé (by marriage)
- Religion: Teke spiritualism

Ngalifourou (1864 – 8 June 1956) was a queen of the Tio Kingdom in what is today the Republic of Congo (Congo-Brazzaville). As a ruler she was close to French colonial authorities. Jan Vansina wrote that Ngalifourou "succeeded in providing a new rallying point for Tio pride", but that she "represented a typical colonial force".

== Biography ==
Ngalifourou was born in 1864 in Ngabé on the Congo River. A member of the Tio people (Eastern Teke), who are a Bantu community living between the present-day Democratic Republic of the Congo and the Republic of the Congo, Ngalifourou was married at the age of 15 to King Iloo I (also known as Iloo Makoko), who was much older than her. She was his second wife, titled Waafitieere. Oral traditions suggest they married in 1880.

After their marriage, Ngalifourou upheld the king's authority and gained respect for her intelligence, including from Pierre Savorgnan de Brazza, who was a French colonial army officer who collaborated with her husband. De Brazza presented Ngalifourou with a sabre as a gesture of admiration. In 1944, de Brazza's daughter, Marthe de Brazza, visited Ngalifourou, who showed her the sword and discussed her father with de Brazza. This 'collaboration' between de Brazza, Iloo Makoko and, indeed, Ngalifouroou, was in fact a treaty signed by Iloo Makoko in 1880, which ceded Teke territory to France, thus establishing French Congo.

At the death of King Iloo I in 1892, Ngalifourou ascended to the throne as Man Ounko (Queen Mother) of the Mbé Kingdom. Tradition meant that Ngalifourou needed to marry again, which she did, but she and the new king lived apart, something that was an accepted practice in Teke customs; neither did they have children. She did however, return to live in her birthplace in Ngabé.

=== Spiritual life ===
Ngalifourou was a spiritual leader as well. She did this through close association with Nkwe Mbali, spirituality associated with the king. Due to her supposed spiritual power, many people made pilgrimages to visit her at Ngabé where she would receive visitors on her likouba royal stool. As a result Ngalifourou was targeted by Catholic and Protestant missionaries who wanted her to adopt one of their faiths, knowing that if she did so it would influence others; however she resisted and continued Téké spiritual practices.

=== French colonial rule ===
In 1918 a successor to the king died travelling back from Brazzaville, believed to have been poisoned by Ngalifourou. The French installed Ngalifourou as chef de canton as the throne remained empty, symbolising the defeat of kingship. Queen Ngalifourou, after 1918, she ruled alone for years and retained the title of chef de canton, until her death in 1956. While kingship later returned, the king's authority was reduced to less than that of a chef de canton and Ngalifourou remained dominant until her death.

Ngalifourou did not retire from public life, but became a prominent figure known to the French colonial administration. She was seen as an example of a traditional ruler, who accepted colonial rule. She met General de Gaulle on several occasions, notably in March 1944, when she was presented with the Légion d'honneur medal. To cement her relationship with the French, she encouraged Teké soldiers to join the French military in both the First World War and the Second World War. Such was her relationship with the colonial authorities that some Teké referred to her as "Ngalifourou, the woman of the whites". Jan Vansina wrote that Ngalifourou "succeeded in providing a new rallying point for Tio pride", but that she "represented a typical colonial force". In the late 1940s and early 1950s, her influence waned as political parties wanted independence from the French grew in popularity.

Ngalifourou died on 8 June 1956. Her funeral became a tool for the French authorities to try and prop up their power and they arranged a huge funeral for the former queen, which was attended not just by local colonial dignitaries, but by representatives from other French colonies, the Vatican and the Belgian Congo. Journalists had been encouraged to stay in Ngabé to report on the queen's final days as well as her funeral.

== Awards and honours ==
- Légion d'honneur (1944).
- Order of the Star of the Comoros Island of Anjouan.
- Medal of Overseas Service of Benin.

== Legacy ==
The role of Queen Mother is still respected in Teké society and the person in that role bears the name Ngalifourou out of respect for their predecessor. She is also listed by UNESCO as one of the most important women in African History.

Ngalifourou features in the poem Le pardon de l'adieu by Tchicaya U Tam'Si.

== Bibliography ==
- La reine Ngalifourou souveraine des Téké - Eugénie Mouayani Opou (2006).
