= Enteromius brazzai =

Conservation status
- Least Concern (IUCN 3.1)

Scientific classification
- Domain: Eukaryota
- Kingdom: Animalia
- Phylum: Chordata
- Class: Actinopterygii
- Order: Cypriniformes
- Family: Cyprinidae
- Subfamily: Smiliogastrinae
- Genus: Enteromius
- Species: E. brazzai

Binomial name
- Enteromius brazzai (Pellegrin, 1901)

Synonyms
- Barbus brazzai Pellegrin, 1901; Barbus alvarezi Roman, 1971; Barbus tshopoensis De Vos, 1991

Species of fish

Enteromius brazzai is a species of ray-finned fish in the genus Enteromius which occurs in the central Congo Basin and some other rivers in Gabon, Central African Republic and Cameroon.

== Size ==
This species reaches a length of 11.0 cm (4.3 in).

== Etymology ==
The fish is named in honor of Franco-Italian explorer Pierre Savorgnan de Brazza (1852-1905), who collected the type specimen.
