= First ladies and gentlemen of Gabon =

First Lady of Gabon
- Incumbent; Zita Nyangue Oligui Nguema since August 30, 2023
- Residence: Presidential Palace, Liberville
- Term length: No term limit; no term for First Lady
- Inaugural holder: Pauline M'ba; Catherine M'ba
- Formation: February 12, 1961

First Lady or First Gentleman of Gabon is the title held by the spouse of the president of Gabon. The current first lady is Zita Nyangue Oligui Nguema, wife of Brice Oligui, the Transitional President of Gabon.

== First ladies of Gabon ==
Name	Term begins	Term ends	President of Gabon
Pauline M'ba, Catherine M'ba (polygamous marriage)	12 February 1961	27 November 1967	Léon M'ba
Patience Dabany	27 November 1967	1987 (divorced)	Omar Bongo
Position vacant	1987	August 4, 1989	Omar Bongo
Edith Lucie Bongo	August 4, 1989 (marriage to Bongo)	March 14, 2009 (died in office)	Omar Bongo
Position vacant	March 14, 2009	8 June 2009	Omar Bongo
Jacques Rogombé	10 June 2009	16 October 2009	Rose Francine Rogombé (acting)
Sylvia Bongo Ondimba	16 October 2009	30 August 2023	Ali Bongo Ondimba
Zita Nyangue Oligui Nguema	30 August 2023	Present	Brice Clotaire Oligui Nguema
