= Mbé =

Town in the Republic of Congo

Coordinates: 3.3038°S 15.8975°E

Mbé is a town in the Republic of the Congo. It is located in the district of Ngabé in the department of Djoué-Léfini, approximately 200 km northeast of Brazzaville.

== Site Description ==
The royal domain of Mbé was composed of various sites related to the culture and the history of the Bateke people. The capital and residence of the Makoko (king) was also referred to as Mbé.

The Kingdom knew ceaseless displacements throughout its history. The precolonial Bateke cultural tradition, indeed, required the displacement of the capital “Mbé” whenever a king died suddenly.

== World Heritage Status ==
This site was added to the UNESCO World Heritage Tentative List on June 12, 2008, in the Cultural category.

== Notable people ==
- Ngalifourou, Queen Mother of the Teke and ally of the French colonisers.
