= Malamine Camara =

Senegalese sergeant

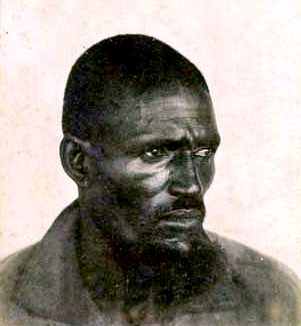
Malamine Camara

Malamine Camara (died in 1886) was a Senegalese sergeant in the French colonial army, and a key figure in the extension of French colonial rule in the Congo Basin.

== Career ==
Camara was born in the Senegalese interior, though his exact date and place of birth are not known. His ethnicity has been described as Soninke, but a French contemporary described Camara as having "a mix of Moor and Berber blood" and notes that he spoke the Toucouleur language. Camara was recruited as a laptot or colonial soldier, probably in the early 1870s. In Dakar, January 1880, he volunteered to join an expedition led by Franco-Italian explorer Pierre Savorgnan de Brazza from the coast of Gabon to the Congo River. The mission included 11 other West African soldiers, 4 Gabonese interpreters, and 4 Frenchmen including Brazza. Camara quickly proved his worth on the expedition, learning local languages and winning the support of local populations, as well as the respect of his French commanders.

In October 1880, Brazza assigned Camara to lead a 3-man detachment tasked with founding an outpost in Mfoa, which is the site of present-day Brazzaville on the right bank of the Congo River. Camara and his men stayed there for more than 18 months until they received orders to return to Gabon. During this period at Mfoa, in which Camara received neither reinforcements nor significant supplies from the French, he established excellent relations with local communities. Through his hunting skills, he not only kept his men fed but even made regular contributions of meat (hippopotamus and buffalo) to chiefs in the area, who nicknamed him mayele (meaning a resourceful person) and tata nyama, meaning "meat father." Camara carried out his mission to show the French flag and defend France's newly acquired territory from rival claims by Belgium.

Camara twice encountered Henry Morton Stanley, the American explorer who was leading Belgian efforts to claim and colonize the Congo region. They first met in July 1881, when Camara and his two men went to visit Stanley's camp at Kinshasa on the left bank of the river. To dissuade the American from trying to expand Belgian territorial claims across the river, Camara showed him a copy of the treaty a local king, Makoko Iloo I, had signed with Brazza granting his territory to France. The two men met again in January 1882, when Stanley sailed across the river in a newly arrived steamboat accompanied by a large number of Zanzibari mercenaries. French historians have speculated that Stanley hoped this show of force would cause Camara and his men to abandon their post at Mfoa, thus letting Belgium usurp France's claim to the territory. In any case, Camara's squad held its ground, and Stanley and his men promptly returned to their camp across the river. Stanley wrote in his memoirs that he was impressed by the Senegalese sergeant, who appeared very devoted to his mission and very much in charge of his men.

In May 1882, a messenger brought a written order from the French military command that Camara and his men were to leave Mfoa and return to the French post in Franceville, Gabon. Camara was dubious of this order, and suspected that Belgium had pressured the French to withdraw. Prior to leaving, Camara visited all the local chiefs and told them that his absence would be only temporary, and urged them to remain loyal to France while he was away.

Brazza, who had since returned to France, mounted another expedition to the Congo basin in 1883, and put Camara in charge of recruiting the mission's African personnel in Dakar. Once on the Gabonese coast, Camara was responsible for purchasing dugout canoes with which the expedition would travel into the interior. When they reached the Congo River, they found local populations overjoyed at Camara's return; his personal efforts may have prevented these populations from succumbing to Stanley's influence. Throughout this mission Camara was indispensable to his commanders, supplying ample meat from his hunts and maintaining the trust of the local people. His importance to the French mission was so great that, as Brazza's deputy Charles de Chavannes later claimed, the Belgians in Kinshasa put a bounty on his head. Before departing for the coast in 1884, Brazza left Chavannes in charge of the new permanent Brazzaville outpost; Malamine served as Chavannes' aide-de-camp and was instrumental in provisioning the post with food.

On February 1, 1885, during a ceremony in Brazzaville, Camara was awarded the Médaille militaire, among France's highest honors given to non-citizens in its armed forces. But his health was ailing from what appears to have been a bladder infection. By early 1885 the camp physician believed that Camara was dying, and the sergeant went home to Senegal later that year. He died in January 1886 in the military hospital in Goree Island. The precise cause of his death is unknown.

== Legacy ==
While Camara's singular contributions to the establishment of France's Congo colony were generally unappreciated during his lifetime (indeed, he was never even able to collect the pay from his last mission), in the years following his death the French dedicated a bronze plaque in Brazzaville and christened a steamboat in his honor. A side street in the Poto-Poto neighborhood of Brazzaville was also named after him. In his native Senegal, a secondary school was renamed in his honor. During an official visit to Brazzaville in April 2018, Senegalese President Macky Sall paid tribute to Camara and his role in Congo's colonial history.

== External sources ==
- Bonneau, Bernard. (February 1952) "Malamine." Tropiques:22-27.
- Chavannes, Charles de. (1929) "Le Sergent Sénégalais Malamine." Annales de l’Académie des Sciences Coloniales, vol. 3:159-187.
- Chavannes, Charles de. (1935) Avec Brazza : Souvenirs de la Mission de l’Ouest Africaine (mars 1883 – janvier 1886). Paris: Plon.
- Stanley, Henry Morton. (1885) The Congo and the Founding of Its Free State: A Story of Work and Exploration. London: Sampson Low.
