= Pierre Savorgnan de Brazza =

Italian-French explorer (1852–1905)

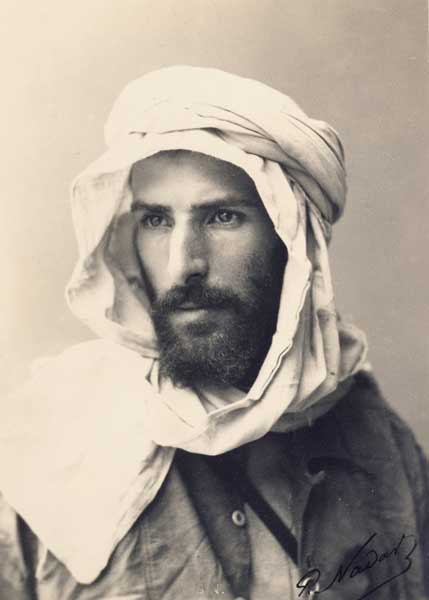
- Brazza c. 1890 photographed by Nadar
- Born: Pietro Paolo Savorgnan di Brazzà; 26 January 1852; Rome, Papal States
- Died: 14 September 1905 (aged 53); Dakar, Upper Senegal and Niger, French West Africa
- Occupation: Explorer
- Spouse: Thérèse Pineton de Chambrun (m. 1895)
- Children: Jacques; Antoine; Charles; Marthe
- Relatives: Adolphe de Chambrun (father-in-law); Pierre de Chambrun (brother-in-law); Charles de Chambrun (brother-in-law)

Pierre Paul François Camille Savorgnan de Brazza (born Pietro Paolo Savorgnan di Brazzà; 26 January 1852 – 14 September 1905) was an Italian-French explorer. With his family's financial help, he explored the Ogooué region of Central Africa, and later with the backing of the Société de Géographie de Paris, he reached far into the interior along the right bank of the Congo River. He has often been depicted as a man of friendly manner, great charm and peaceful approach towards the Africans he met and worked with on his journeys. Under French colonial rule, the capital of the Republic of the Congo was named Brazzaville after him and the name was retained by the post-colonial rulers.

== Early years ==
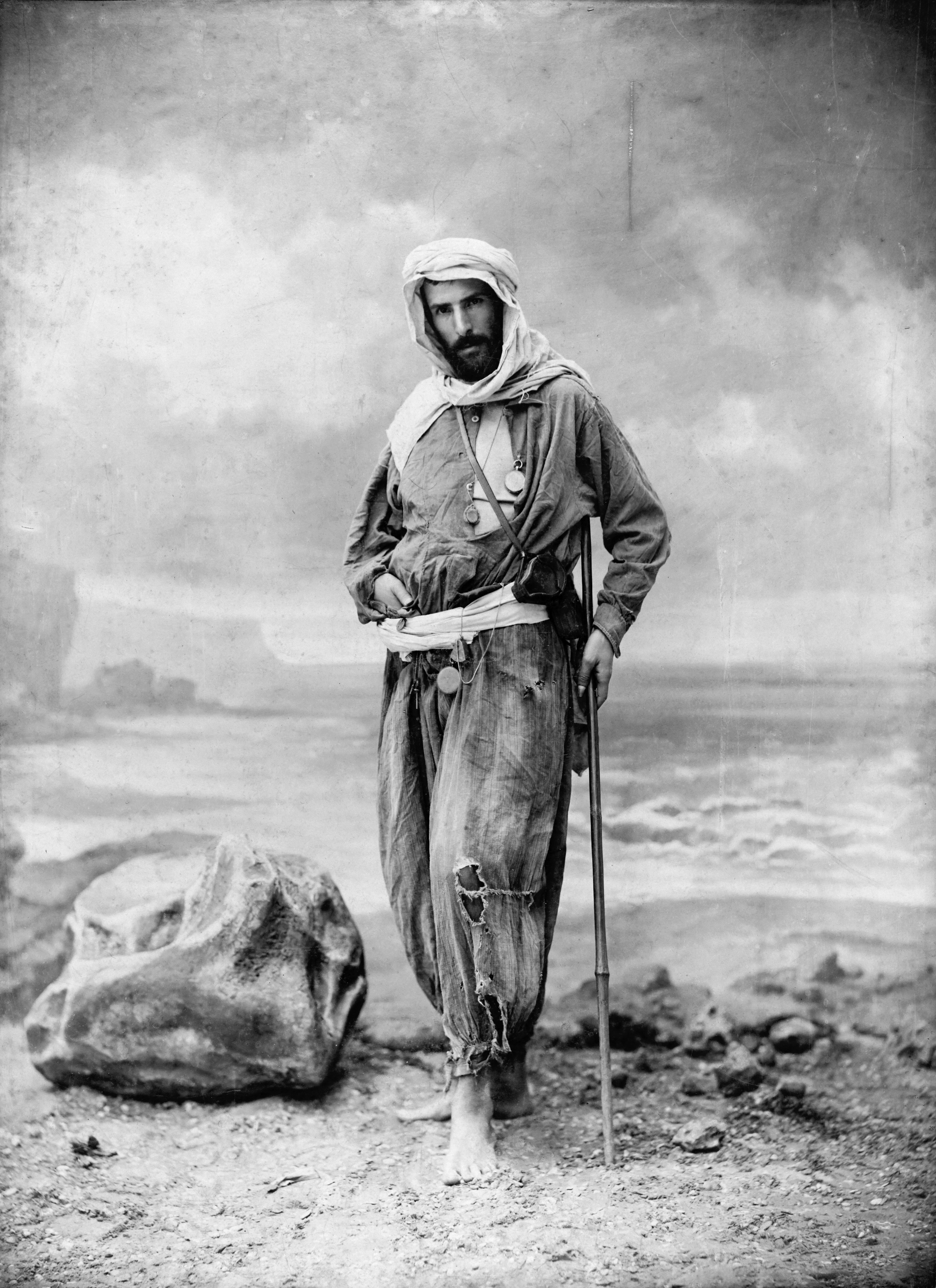
Pierre Savorgnan de Brazza, by Nadar, 1889

Born in Rome, Pietro Savorgnan di Brazzà was the seventh of thirteen children. His father, Ascanio Savorgnan di Brazzà, was a nobleman and well known artist, from a family with ancient Friulian origins and many French connections. His mother, Giacinta Simonetti, from an old Roman family with Venetian roots, was 24 years younger than his father. From an early age, Pietro was interested in exploration, particularly in West Africa, and he won entry to the French naval school Academy of Borda at Brest. In 1870, he graduated and sailed aboard the French ironclad Jeanne d'Arc to Algeria, where he witnessed the bloody suppression of the Mokrani Revolt. This committed him to a philosophy of non-violence throughout his life.

== Exploration in Africa ==
Brazza first encountered Africa in 1872, while sailing on an anti-slavery mission near Gabon. His next ship was the Vénus, which stopped at Gabon regularly. In 1874, Brazza made two trips into the interior, up the Gabon and Ogooué rivers. He then proposed to the government that he explore the Ogooué to its source. With the help of friends in high places, including Jules Ferry and Leon Gambetta, he secured partial funding, the rest coming from his own pocket. He was granted French citizenship in 1874, and adopted the French spelling of his name. His efforts to gain citizenship had been aided by Louis Raymond de Montaignac de Chauvance, who acted as Brazza's patron in the early years of his career.

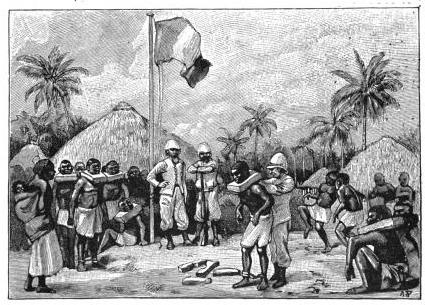
Brazza frees slaves in a village in Congo

In this expedition, which lasted from 1875 to 1878, 'armed' only with cotton textiles and tools to use for barter, and accompanied by a medical doctor, Noel Ballay, a naturalist, Alfred Marche, his assistant, Victor Hamon, twelve Senegalese laptots, four Gabonese interpreters and his cook, Chico, the explorer made his way deep inland where no other European had ventured because of the river dwellers' resistance. But Brazza's lack of fear and peaceful demeanor gained him the trust of the people encountered. Upon his return to Paris he was fêted as a celebrity in the French press and was courted by the French political elite as the man to advance their imperialist ambitions in Africa.

The French government authorised a second mission, which was carried out from 1879 to 1882. They had adjudged his first mission a success and felt that a mission to the Congo Basin was needed to prevent Henry M. Stanley, in the service of Leopold II of Belgium, from occupying the entire area. By following the Ogooué River upstream and proceeding overland to the Lefini River and then downstream, Brazza succeeded in reaching the Congo River in 1880 without encroaching on Portuguese claims.

Brazza then was received by Makoko Iloo I of the Téké Kingdom in what was the most significant encounter of his career as an explorer. Brazza proposed to the Makoko that he place his kingdom under the protection of the French flag. Makoko, aware of Stanley's advance and interested in trade possibilities and gaining an edge over his rivals, signed the treaty. The terms of this treaty were upheld after the king's death by his queen, Ngalifourou, who became Queen Mother and an influential figure in French colonial life. Brazza respected Ngalifourou so much that he presented her with a sabre. Makoko also arranged for the establishment of a French settlement at Mfoa on the Congo's Malebo Pool, a place later known as Brazzaville; after Brazza's departure, the outpost was manned by two laptots under the command of Senegalese Sergeant Malamine Camara, whose resourcefulness had impressed Brazza during their several months together trekking inland from the coast. During this trip he encountered Stanley near Vivi. Brazza did not tell Stanley that he had just signed a treaty with Makoko; it took Stanley some months to realise that he had been beaten in the "race" set by his sponsor, Leopold II. Brazza was again celebrated in France for his efforts. The press dubbed him "le conquérant pacifique", the peaceful conqueror, for his success in ensuring French imperial expansion without waging war.

In 1883, Brazza was named the governor-general of the French Congo in 1886. He was dismissed in 1897 due to poor revenue from the colony and journalist reports of conditions for the natives that some said were "too good." For his part Brazza had become disillusioned with the exploitative and repressive practices of the concessionary companies, which he had witnessed first-hand.

By 1905, stories had reached Paris of injustice, forced labour and brutality under the laissez-faire approach of the Congo's new governor, Émile Gentil, to the new concession companies set up by the French colonial office and condoned by Prosper Philippe Augouard, Catholic Bishop of the Congo. Brazza was sent to investigate these stories and the resulting report was revealing and damning, in spite of many obstructions placed in his path. When his deputy, Félicien Challaye, put the embarrassing report before the National Assembly, the report was suppressed.

The oppressive conditions in the French Congo continued for decades.

== Personal life ==
Brazza's younger brother, Jacques, was a mountaineer and naturalist who accompanied Pierre in Africa from 1883 to 1886.

Brazza married Thérèse Pineton de Chambrun (1860–1948) on 12 August 1895. They had four children—Jacques (1899–1903), Antoine, Charles and Marthe.

Brazza became a Freemason in 1888, being initiated at the Alsace-Lorraine lodge in Paris on 26 June, but left the organisation in 1904, believing that the French Freemasonry had betrayed its own principles by colluding with corporations for the benefit of an inhuman colonial system.

== Death and legacy ==
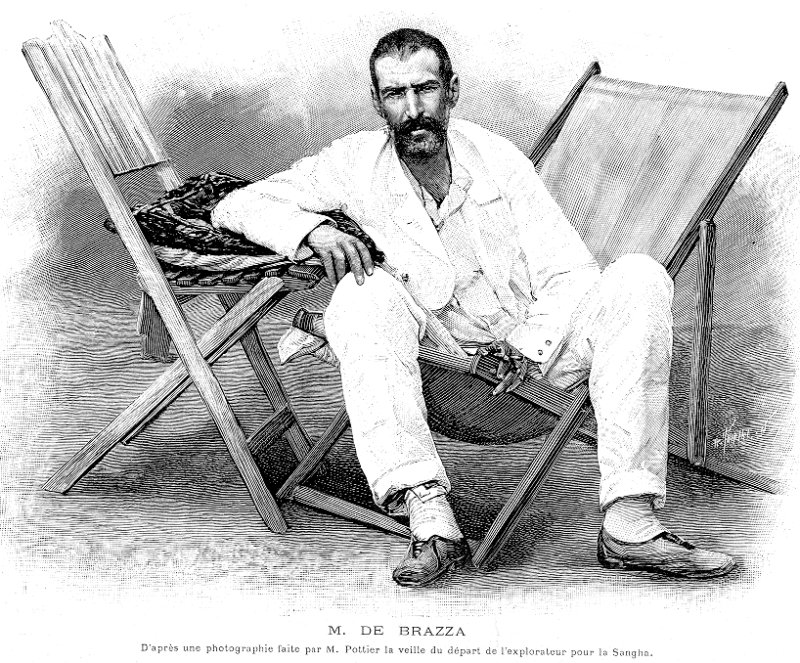
Drawing of Brazza, 23 February 1895

In September 1905, toward the end of his Mission Extraordinaire, Brazza became sick. On the return voyage to France, when the ship docked in Dakar, a major port, he was brought to the hospital where he died at the age of 53, with his wife Thérèse at his side. His body was repatriated to France and he was given a state funeral at Sainte-Clotilde, Paris. Thérèse, who always maintained that her husband had been poisoned by the colonial authorities, refused the honour of burial in the Pantheon and buried him temporarily at the cemetery of Père Lachaise in Paris. Later, Thérèse had Brazza's body exhumed and re-interred in Algiers (capital of present-day Algeria). The epitaph on his burial site in Algiers reads: "Une mémoire pure de sang humain" ("a memory untainted by human blood").

In 2006, his remains were once again exhumed and removed to a mausoleum in Brazzaville.

The French Navy aviso Savorgnan de Brazza, completed in 1933 and sold in 1957, was named for Brazza.

=== Brazzaville Mausoleum ===
The Brazza Mausoleum at Brazzaville

In February 2005, Congolese president Denis Sassou Nguesso, Gabonese president Omar Bongo and French president Jacques Chirac gathered at a ceremony to lay the foundation stone for a memorial to Brazza, a mausoleum of Italian marble. On 30 September 2006, Brazza's remains were exhumed in Algiers along with those of his wife and four children. They were reinterred in Brazzaville on 3 October in a new, marble mausoleum built for them at a cost of some US$10 million dollars. The reburial ceremony was attended by three African presidents and a French foreign minister, who paid tribute to Brazza's humanitarian work against slavery and the abuse of African workers.

The decision to honour Brazza as a founding father of the Republic of the Congo has elicited protests among some Congolese. Mwinda Press, the journal of the Association of Congolese Democrats in France, published articles quoting Théophile Obenga who depicted Brazza as a coloniser and not a humanist. Obenga claimed Razza raped a Congolese woman, who was a princess and the equivalent of a Vestal Virgin, and to have pillaged villages, raising highly charged questions as to why he should be revered as a national hero instead of the Congolese who fought against colonisation.

=== Taxa named in Brazza's honor ===
- The fish Enteromius brazzai (Pellegrin, 1901).
- The catfish Atopochilus savorgnani.
- De Brazza's monkey Cercopithecus neglectus.
