= Tireli, Mali =

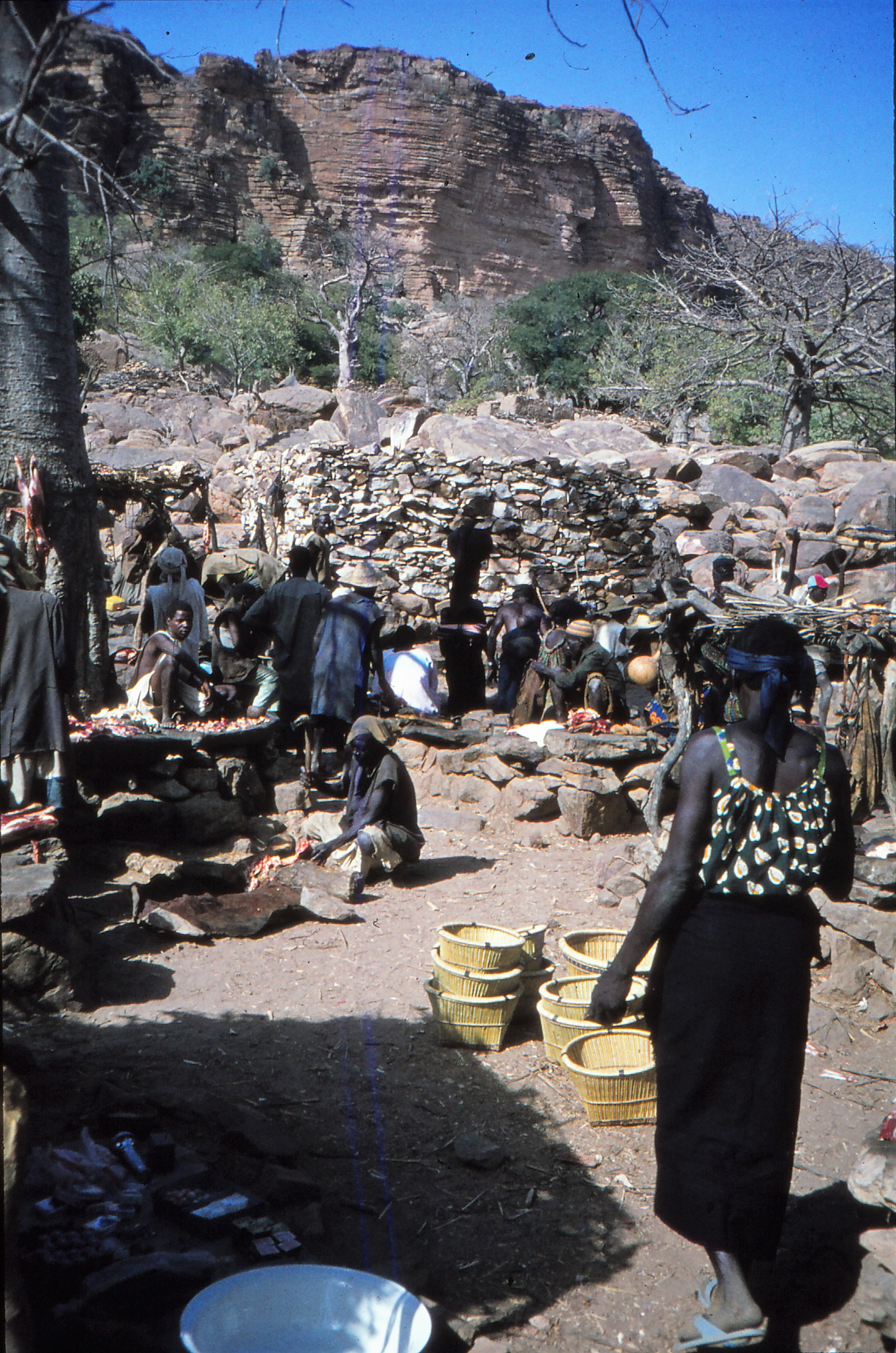
- Villagers selling baskets and meat at Tireli market under the Bandiagara Escarpment in the background, Mali 1984

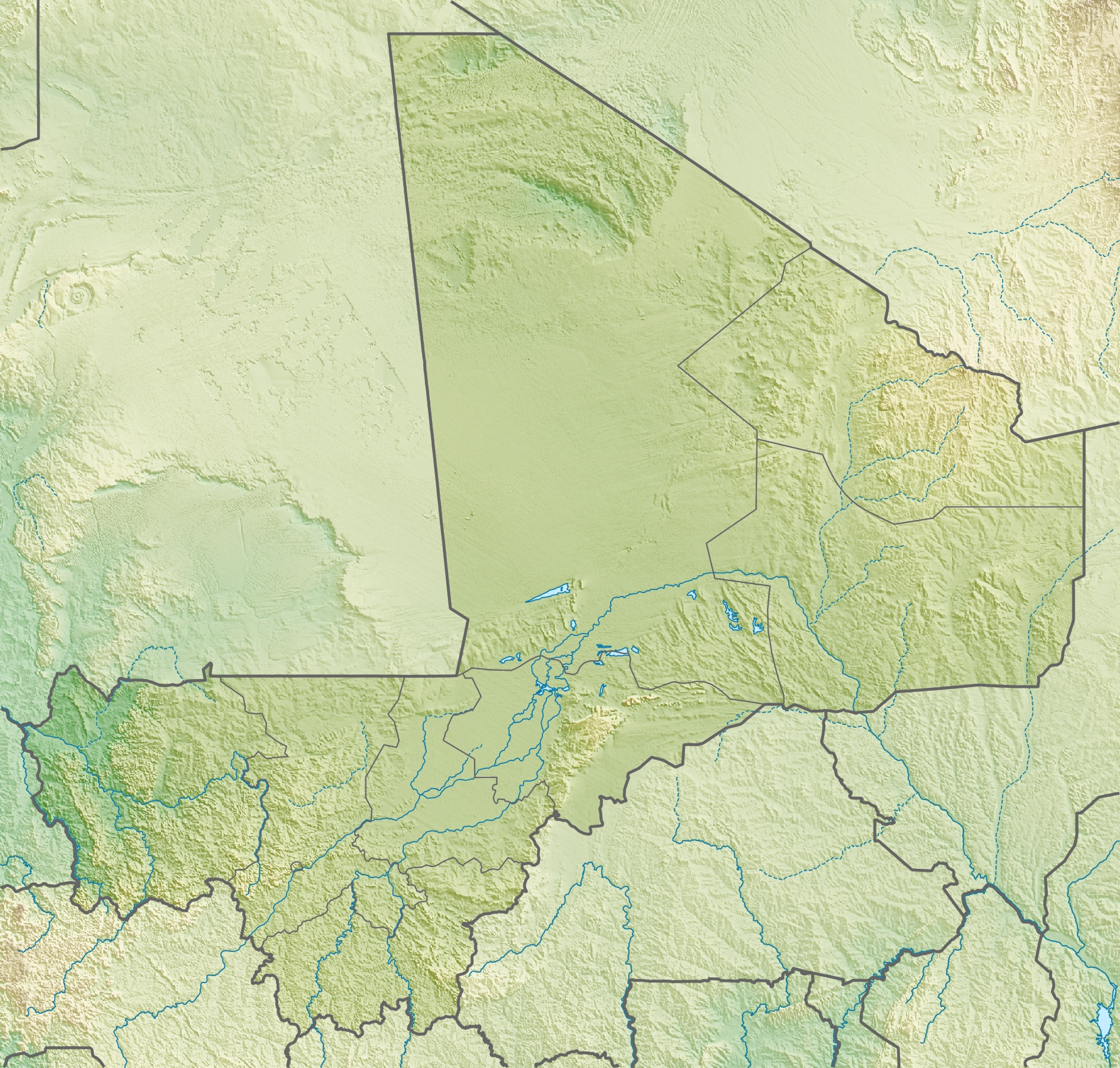
- Tireli, Mali
- Coordinates: 14°22′48″N 3°21′0″W
- Elevation: 362 m (1,188 ft)

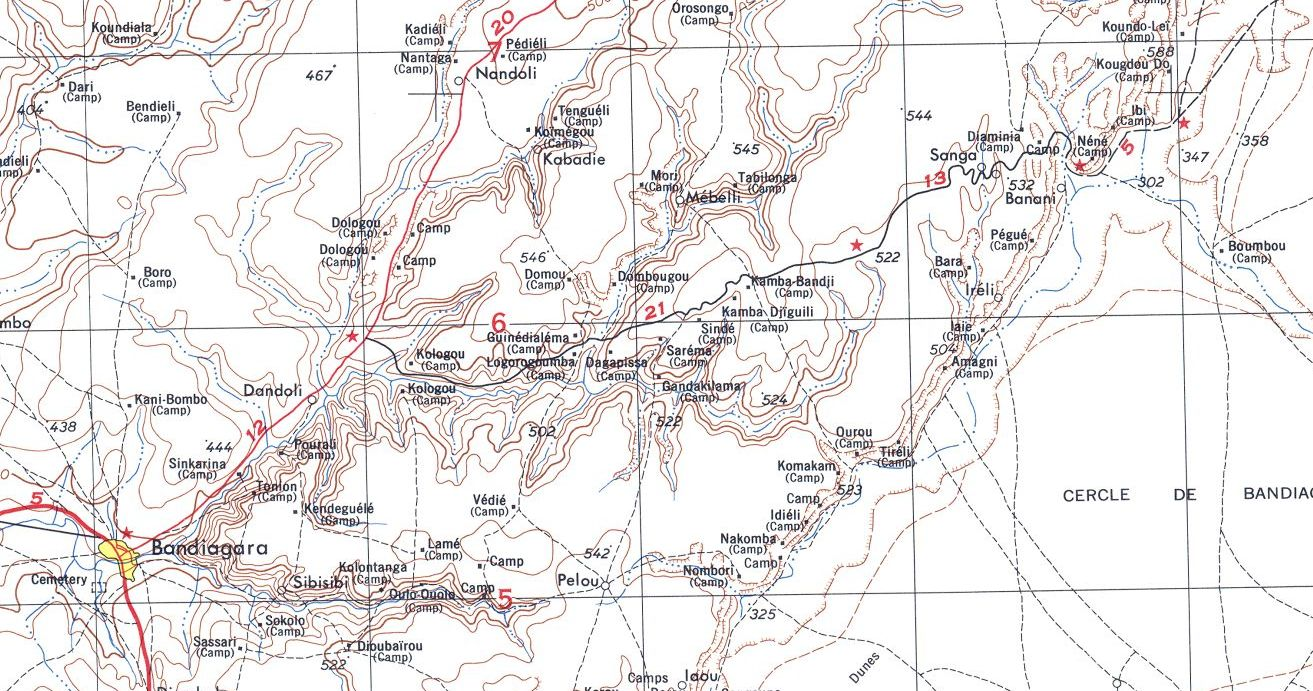
Tireli on a 1954 US Army map at centre right as "Tiréli (Camp)".

Tireli is a village in Dogon country in Mali on the Bandiagara Escarpment in the Bandiagara Cercle. It is located 11 km south-south-west of Sangha and Banani and 28 km east of Bandiagara.

== Gallery ==
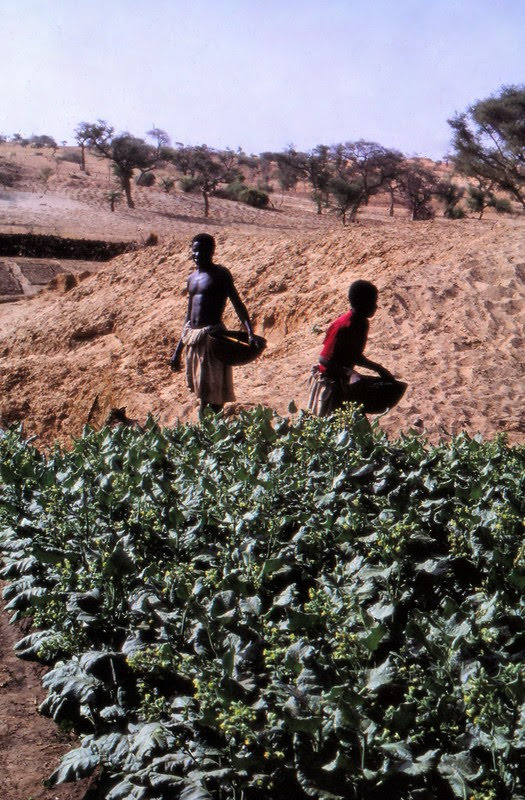
Tobacco cultivation in a dry river bed, Tireli, Mali, 1980

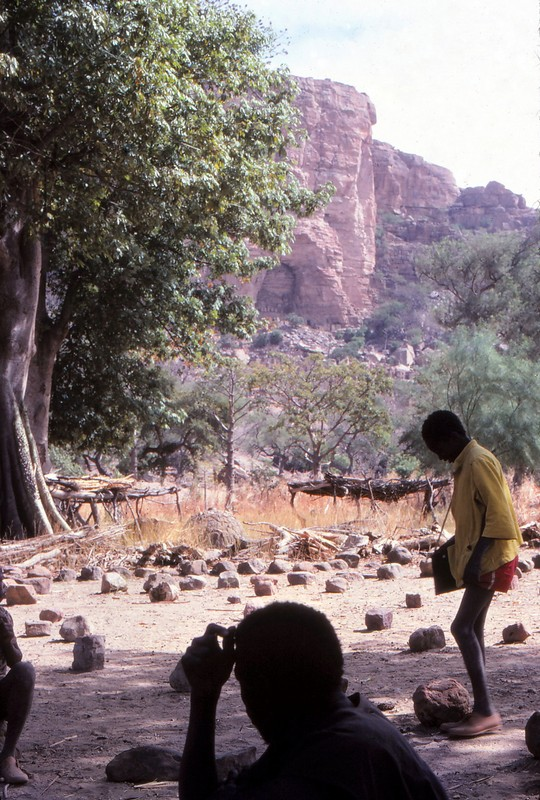
A schoolboy between the sitting stones of the Tireli market, Mali 1984

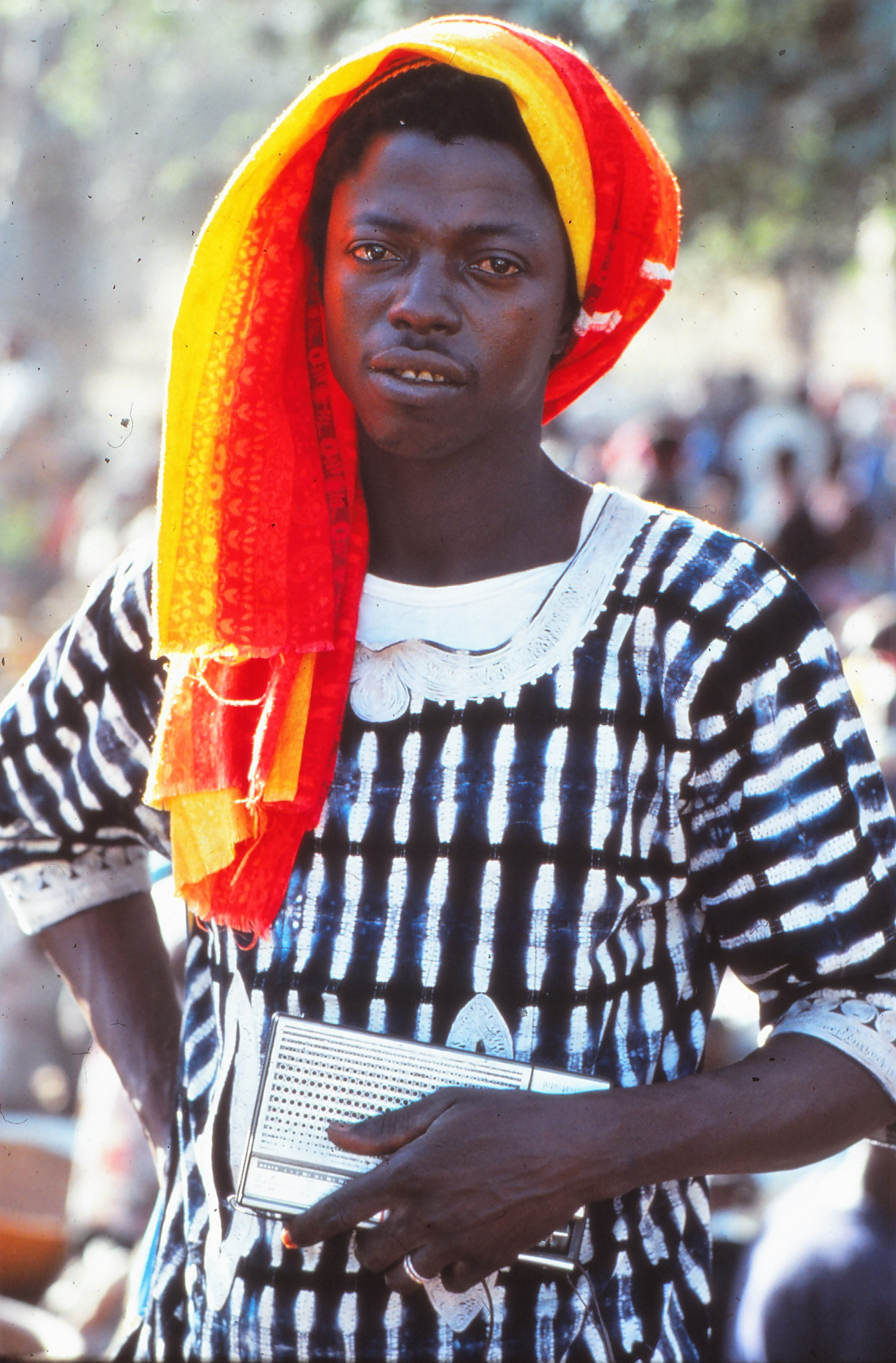
Young Dogon man just returned from Abidjan, with his radio, Tireli, Mali 1985.

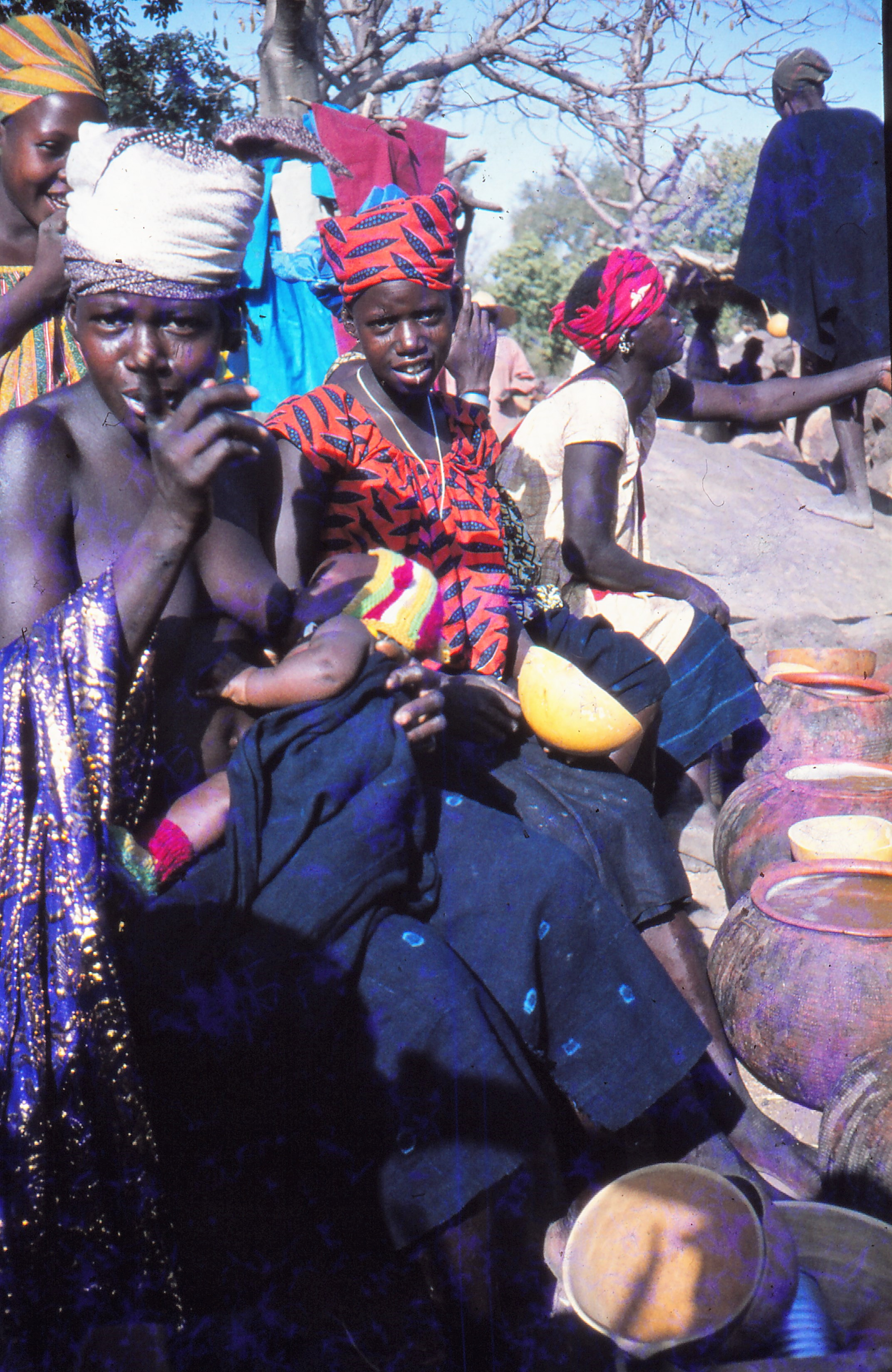
Personal selling: Young female beer sellers admonish the photographer that he also has to buy some, Tireli market, Mali 1989

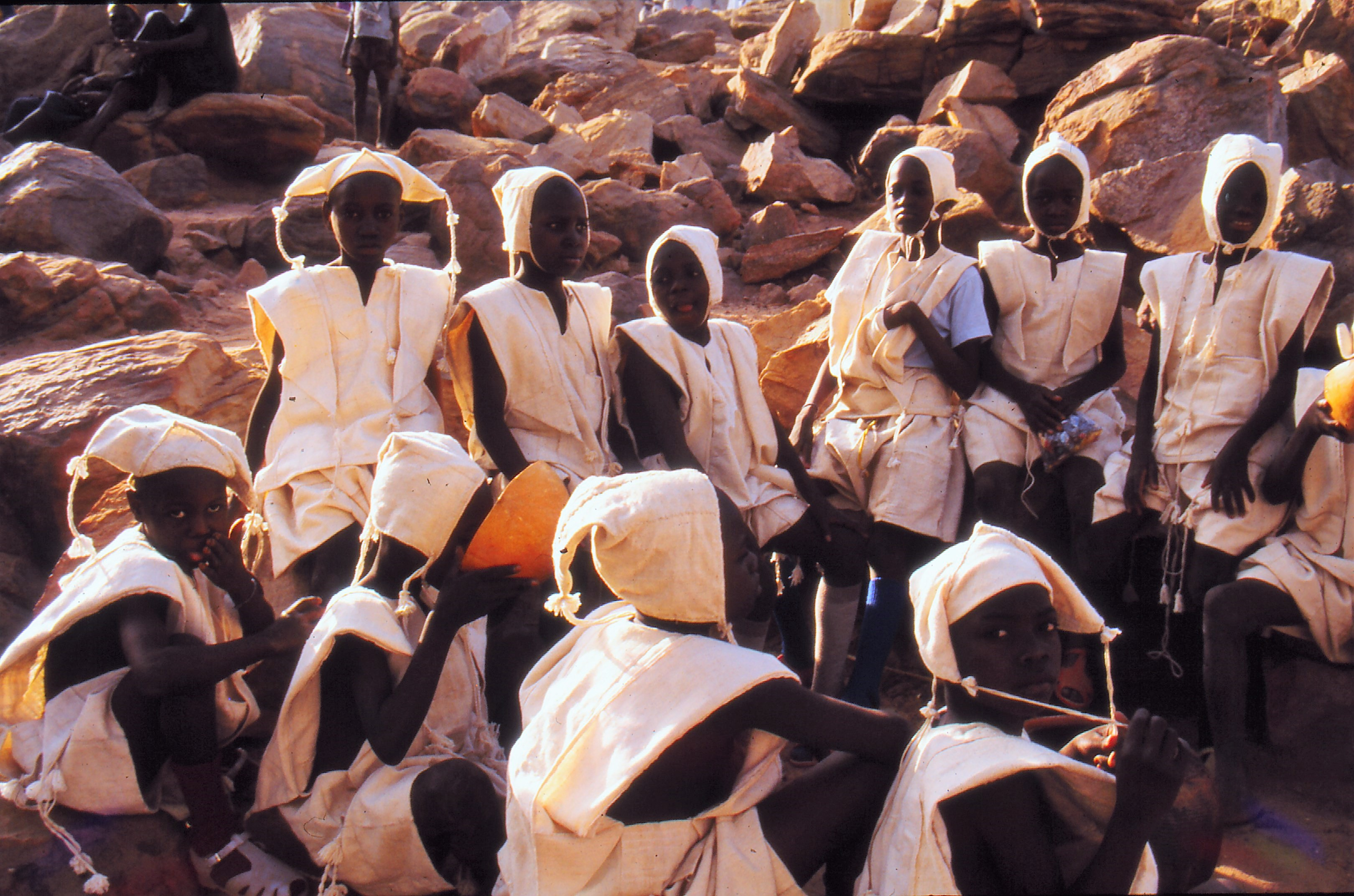
Boys in white clothing with bonnets at Tireli market, just after circumcision, Mali 1990

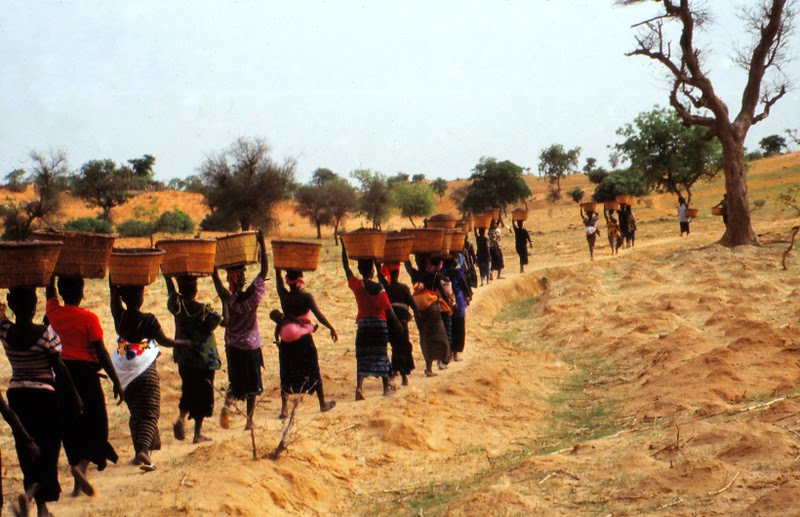
The women of a neighborhood ward with manure on their way to the field of one of them, Tireli, Mali 1990

== Literature ==
- "Beek, W.E.A. van (2016), Thuis in Afrika, een dubbelleven. Book (monograph)". scholarlypublications.universiteitleiden.nl. Afrika-Studiecentrum Leiden. 2016. Full-text in Dutch.
