= Lefini River =

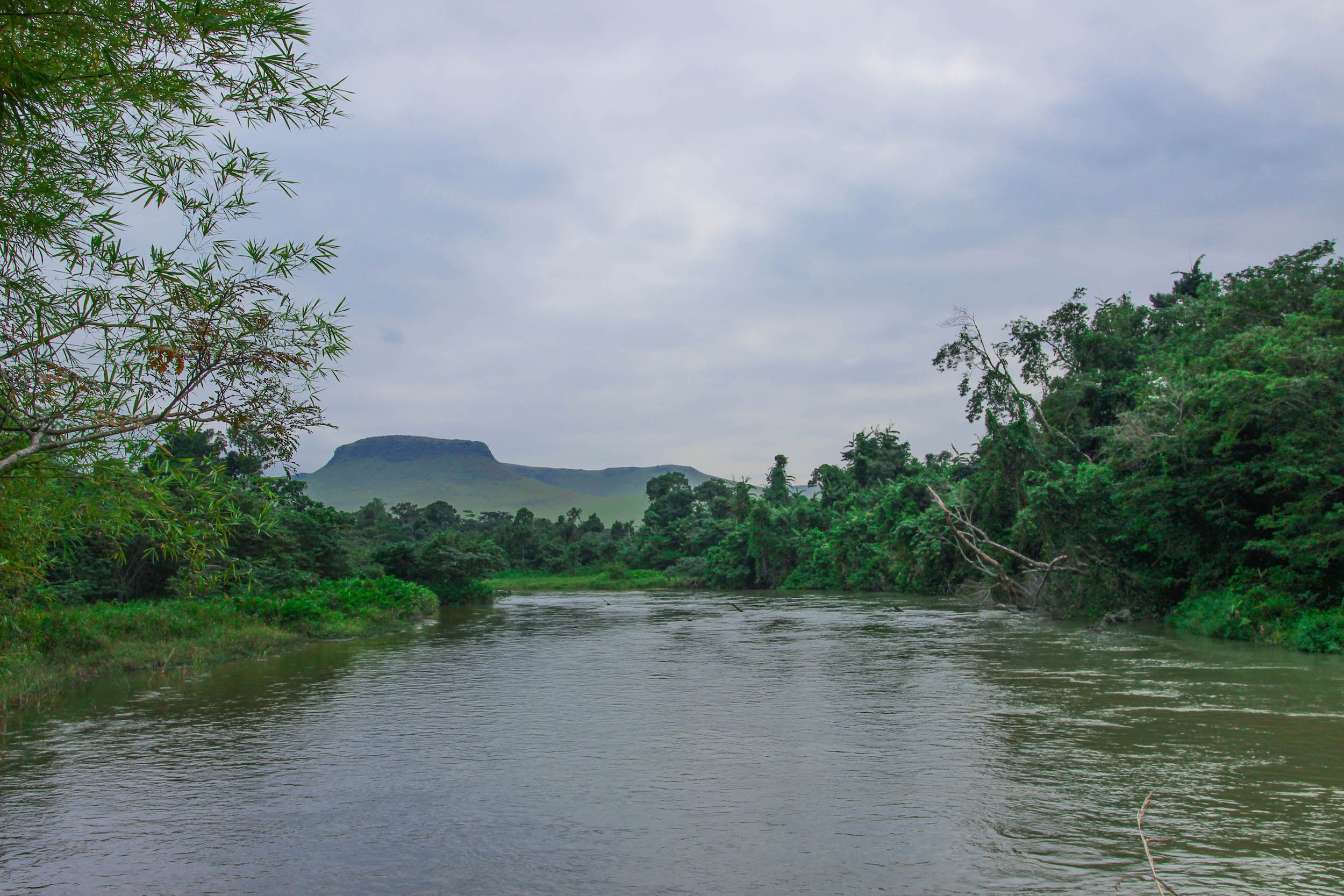

Location
- Country: Republic of the Congo

Physical characteristics
- Mouth: Congo River
  - coordinates: 2°56′17″S 16°8′01″E

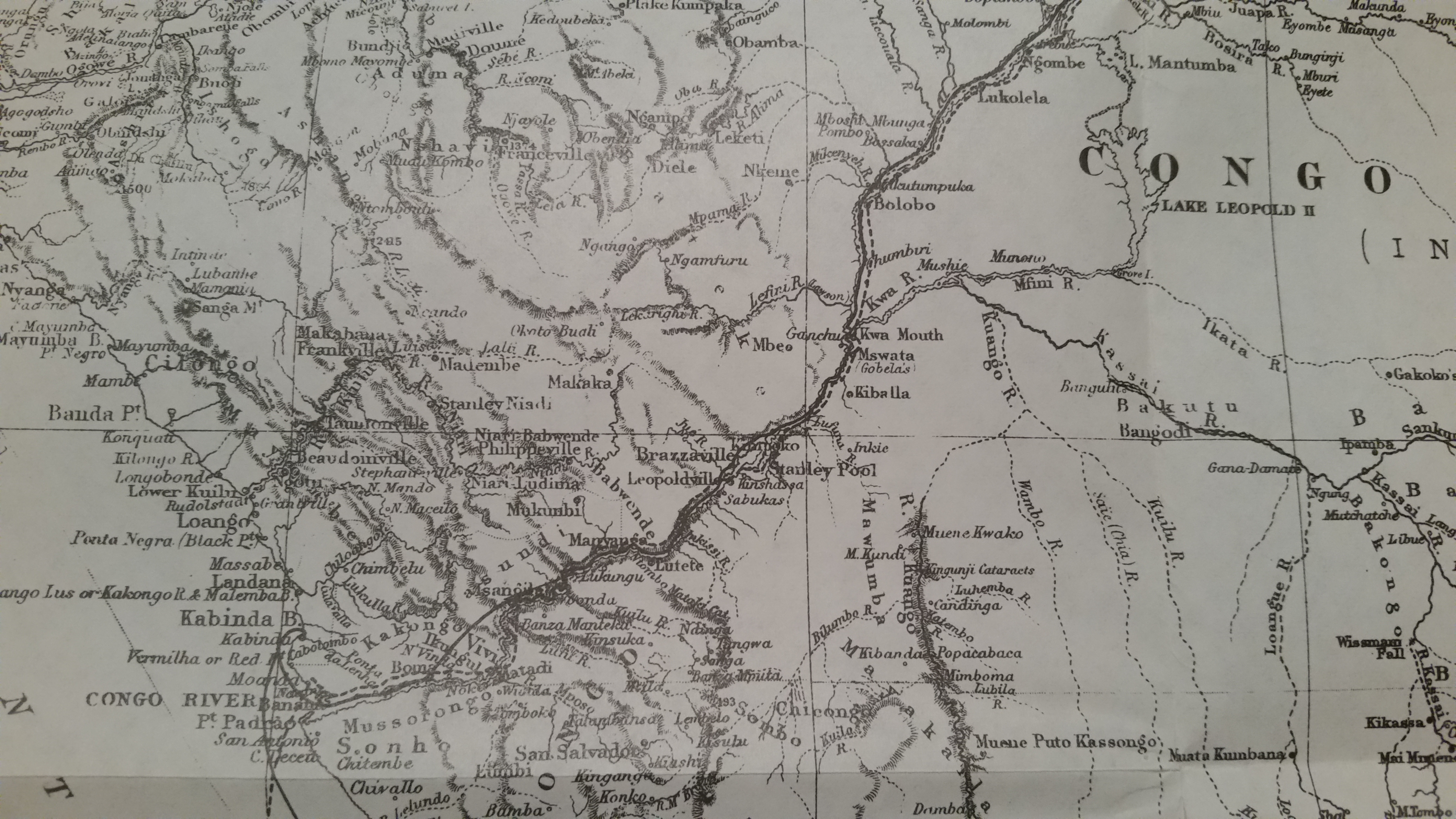
Stanley's route is depicted by the solid black line.

Lefini River (Swahili: Mto Lefini) is a river of the Republic of Congo and a tributary of the Congo River. Henry Morton Stanley reached the confluence on 9 March 1877.

== Villages ==
- Mpe Bambou
