= Ngabé District =

Coordinates: 3°14′S 15°50′E

Ngabe
- District
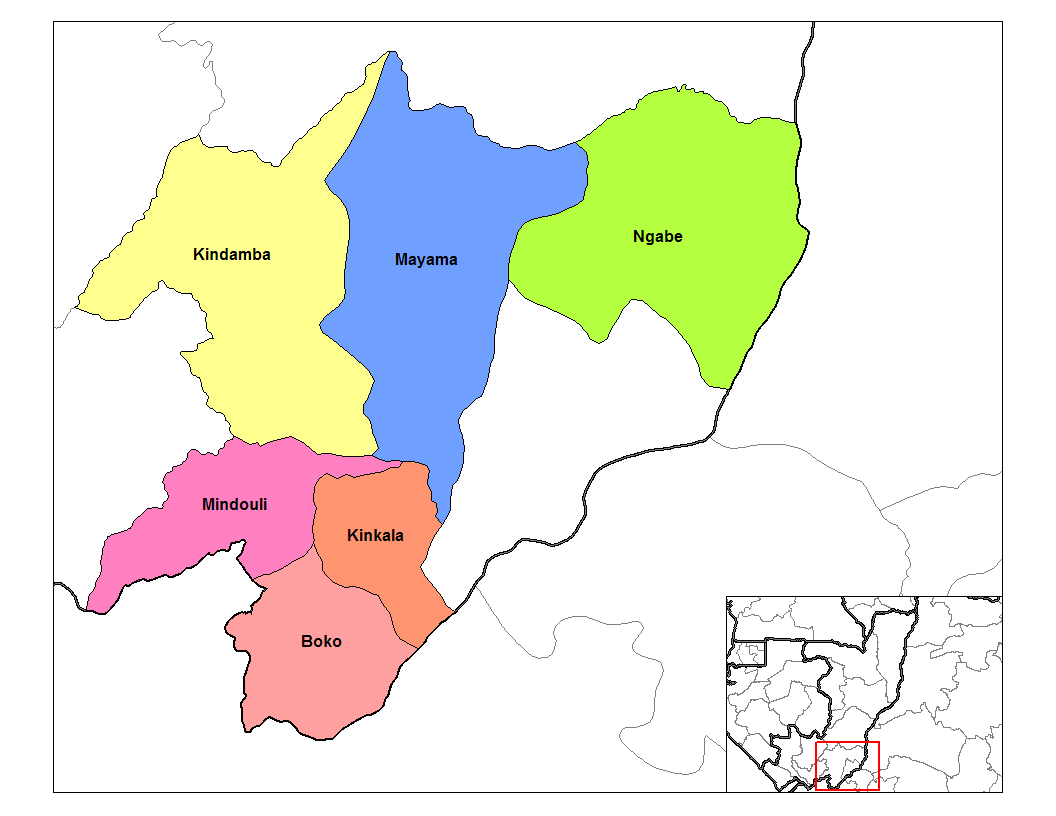
- Location of Ngabe District in Pool department, to which it belonged prior to October 2024
- Country: Republic of the Congo
- Department: Djoué-Léfini

Area
  - Total: 6,785 km^{2} (2,620 sq mi)

Population (2023 census)
  - Total: 45,442
  - Density: 6.697/km^{2} (17.35/sq mi)
- Time zone: UTC+1 (GMT +1)

Ngabe is a district in the Djoué-Léfini Department of south-eastern Republic of the Congo. The capital lies at Ngabe.

== Towns and villages ==
Mbé was added to the UNESCO World Heritage Tentative List on June 12, 2008, in the Cultural category.

== Notable people ==
- Ngalifourou, queen and ally of the French colonisers.
