= Gabon–Germany relations =

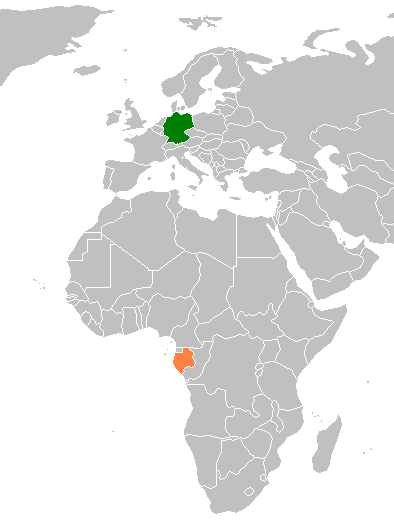

- Gabon: Germany

Gabon–Germany relations are the bilateral relations between Germany and Gabon. The humanitarian activities of the Alsatian doctor Albert Schweitzer, who founded a jungle hospital in Lambaréné in 1913, formed a good basis for friendly relations at a later date. This was an important factor in the positive image that Germany enjoys in Gabon today.

== History ==
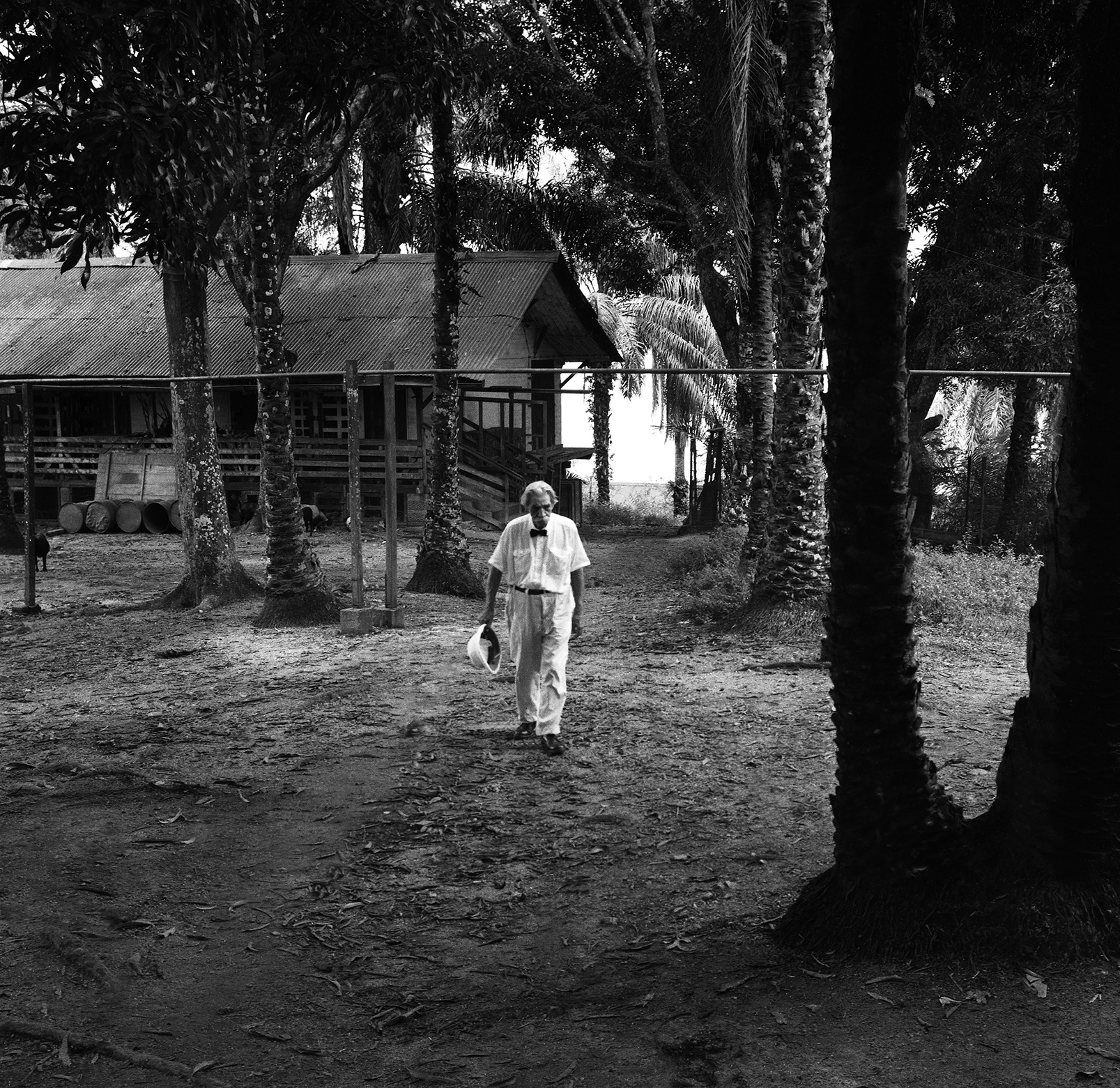
Albert Schweitzer in Lambarene (1964)

German contacts with Gabon began in the mid-19th century through the activities of German researchers, traders and missionaries. In 1862, the Hamburg-based merchant Carl Woerman opened a branch in what is now Gabon and five years later a German consul was sent to Libreville. In 1873, the ethnologist Adolf Bastian travelled along the coast of Gabon and later published his travelogue in Jena. In the same year, the German Society for the Exploration of Equatorial Africa sent an expedition led by Paul Güßfeldt, who visited the Kingdom of Loango. The following year, the German-Austrian explorer, mineralogist and geologist Oskar Lenz became the first European to conduct geological research in Gabon.

In 1894, the German Empire and France defined their colonial spheres of influence in Africa and established the borders between French Gabon and the German colony of Kamerun. With the Morocco-Congo Treaty of 1911, Germany received the area of Neukamerun from France. This also included parts of the present-day Gabonese provinces of Woleu-Ntem and Estuaire, where German settlers introduced cocoa cultivation. Oyem became the location of the 10th company of the German forces in Kamerun. In 1913, Albert Schweitzer built a hospital in the jungle in Lambaréné, which was located in the former French Equatorial Africa, further south. Schweitzer carried out humanitarian work in Lambaréné throughout his life, for which he was awarded the Nobel Peace Prize in 1953.

After Gabon gained independence from France in 1960, diplomatic relations were immediately established with the Federal Republic of Germany. This led to competition with East Germany, which sent Robert Havemann and Gerald Götting to Gabon to see Albert Schweitzer. In 1962, West Germany opened an embassy in Libreville and Gabon opened an embassy in Bonn. That same year, both countries signed an agreement on economic and technical cooperation and agreed on travel facilitation. From 1974 until German reunification, Gabon also maintained diplomatic relations with East Germany.

In 1994, Germany mediated in talks between the government and the opposition in Gabon in Paris. There have been occasional mutual state visits between Germany and Gabon. In 2005, the Gabonese President Omar Bongo Ondimba visited Germany. In 2015, the UN General Assembly adopted a joint German-Gabonese resolution on the fight against illegal animal trade. President Ali-Ben Bongo Ondimba visited Germany in November 2017 for the UN Climate Change Conference in Bonn and met with Federal President Frank-Walter Steinmeier for talks. The military coup in Gabon in 2023 that led to the overthrow of Bongo Ondimba was condemned by Germany, which called for a return to constitutional order in the country.

== Economic relations ==
In 2024, German exports of goods to Gabon amounted to 48.7 million euros and imports from the country to 121 million euros. This put Gabon in 130th place in the ranking of Germany's trading partners. Since Gabon is relatively well-developed due to its oil revenues, Germany does not provide any development aid to Gabon. However, Germany supports the Albert Schweitzer Foundation and its activities in Gabon, which also receive numerous private donations from Germany.

== Cultural relations ==
There is intensive exchange in the fields of education and science between the two countries. The government of Gabon has been awarding scholarships for studies in Germany since the 1980s, and in 2019 almost 200 Gabonese were studying in Germany. A German language department has existed at the state-run Omar Bongo University since 2010. In this small country with a population of just under 2.5 million, a remarkable 4,400 students are learning German. There is cooperation with universities, and the University of Tübingen runs a research center for tropical diseases in Lambaréné. The Max Planck Society also works with institutions in Gabon.

Pierre-Emerick Aubameyang of Gabon was the top scorer in the German Bundesliga in 2017.

== Diplomatic missions ==
- Germany maintains an embassy in Libreville
- Gabon maintains an embassy in Berlin.
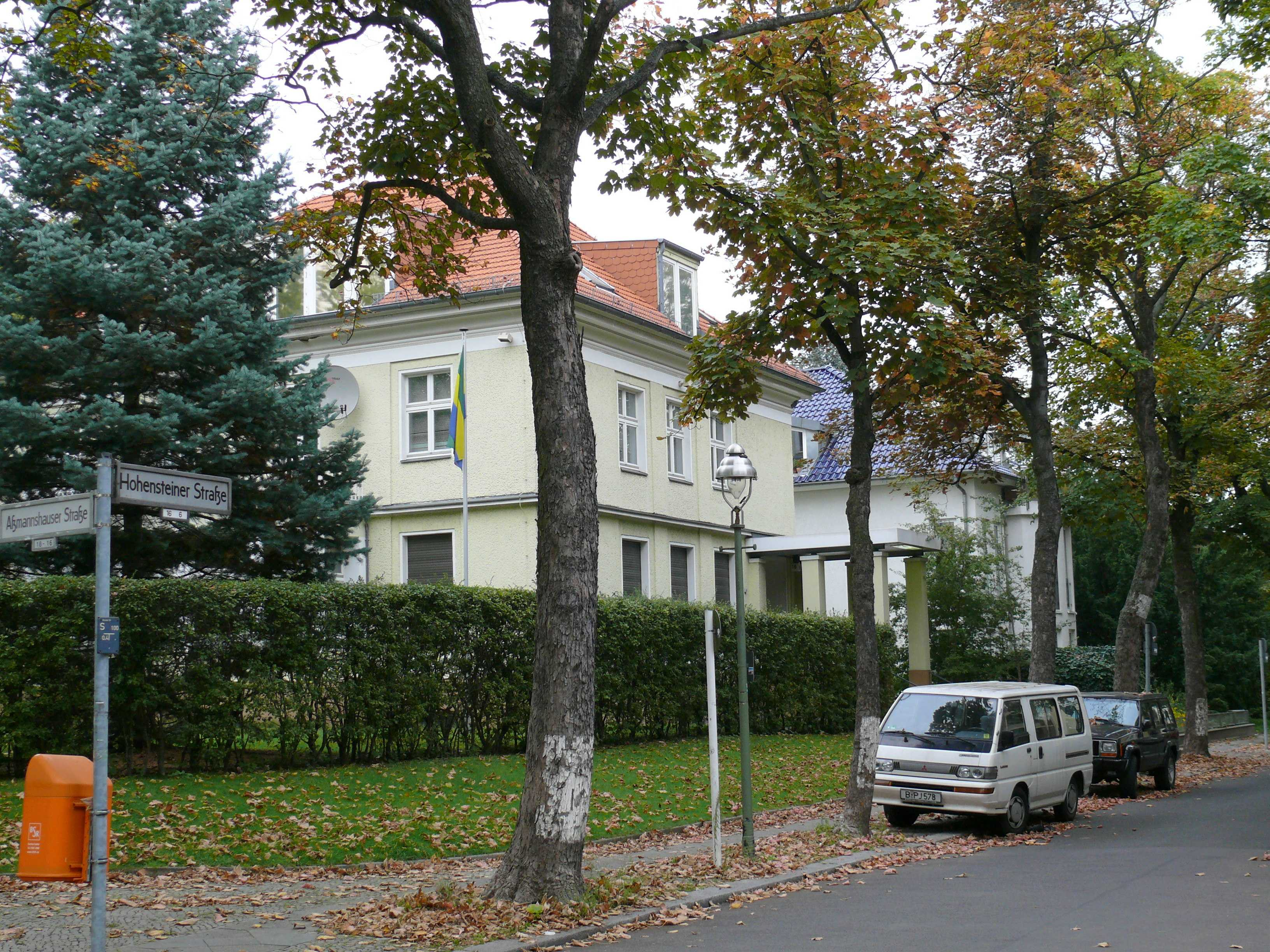
Embassy of Gabon in Berlin

== See also ==
- Foreign relations of Germany
- Foreign relations of Gabon
