= Nsiba =

Nsiba are ornamented whistles that were used by tribes of the Congo Basin for spiritual practices.

== Description ==
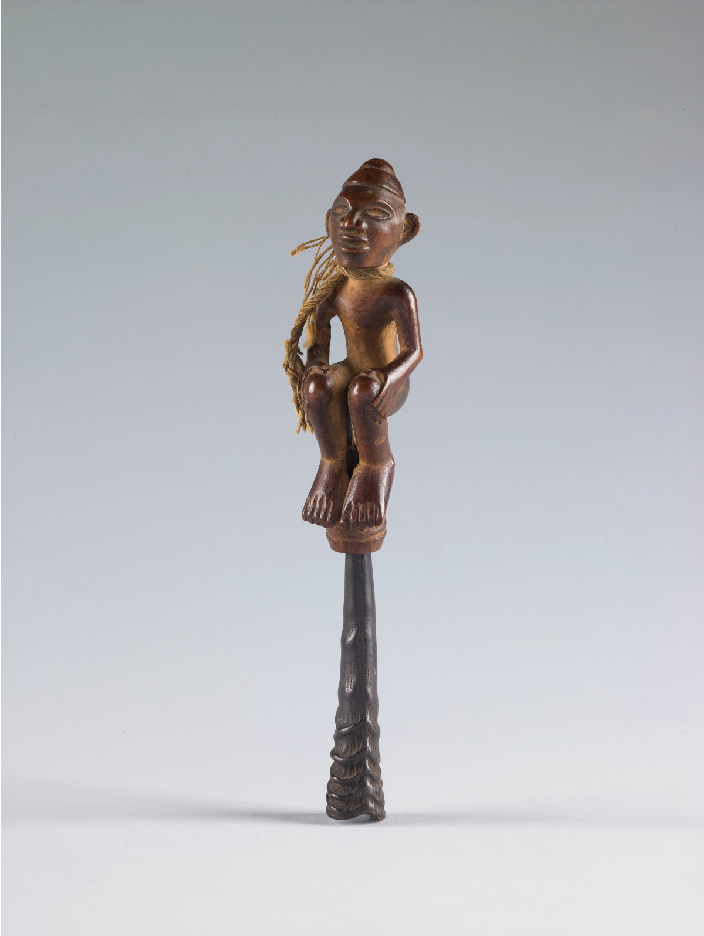
Nsiba whistle held at the Saint Louis Art Museum. This image shows the antelope horn whistle (bottom part) and sculptural aspect of the Nsiba (anthropomorphic figure)

Nsiba are made of small antelope horns and wood. The horns were chosen as a material of predilection for their naturally existing cavity that facilitated their transformation into a whistle. While antelope horns whistles can be found across Africa, the miniature sculptures associated to the Nsiba are generally considered unique to the Lower Congo region. They are associated to the Babwende, Basundi, Bakongo and Woyo tribes.

The small ornamental sculpture could vary in height but would most often measure 10 to 20 centimetres (4 to 8 inches). Although few examples of Nsiba are being held in museums, the known objects suggest that the sculpture is a removable piece, often attached to the whistle itself via a string passing through a hole made at its pointed end.

The mounting sculptures take a variety of forms. Sometimes anthropomorphic, they can be both male or female, representing groups of people, family scenes, coitus or even masks. In other cases, the sculpture can take a zoomorphic form. A wide variety of animals have been represented: antelopes, monkeys, dogs, goats, birds, and more. Whistles could also be adorned with non-figurative sculpting.

The name Nsiba is thought to be derived from the contraction of the word ‘nsia’, used to refer to the species of antelope the horn was taken from (Sylvicapra grimmia), with the verb ‘siba’ (‘to invoke’, ‘to call on a nkisi’).

== Spiritual Practice ==
The ownership and use of Nsiba was reserved to males initiated to the nkisi cult – ritual specialists, baganga (sing, nganga), or certain chiefs. The whistles would be stored as part of the nganga’s medicine bundle, or hung on its associated nkisi figure.

Their main purpose was to call upon minkisi (sing. nkisi), the ancestral power figures operating the supernatural realm, during public performances. Those would then offer their help to resolve crises or find a solution to disputes. Music was an integral part of rituals, with the multi-layered sounds from voice, drums, gongs, bells, and whistles supporting the invocation of spirits.

The uses of the whistles could be varied, and might have depended on the nkisi associated with the figure represented on the whistle. Some sources mention uses in rain making ceremonies, in conflict resolution, and in ceremonies to cure the sick. A 19th century eyewitness testimony recounts the use of a Nsiba whistle as a tool used by a healer to remove bullets from a wounded man. Empowered by the nkisi invoked through the whistle, the nganga was able to use the whistle to suck the bullets out of the injured.

=== Link to hunting ===
Whistles have historically been used as a communication tool for hunters to communicate during group hunts. Beyond this purpose, Nsiba were believed to bewitch the game, their sound encouraging the hunted animals to move towards the hunters rather than running away from them.

Although it is likely that the Nsiba were used in hunting, some sources suggest that only the more simple and non-ornamented version of the whistle would have been used for this purpose. Nevertheless, the use of whistles in spiritual practices illustrated the strong connection between hunting and the nkisi cult.

The metaphorical connection with hunting was expressed in the spirits' role in assisting with the ‘hunting down’ of wrongdoings, conflicts, and beings that purposefully inflict harm upon others. Additionally, the nkisi cult was based around communication between the world of the living and that of the dead. One of the representations of the world of the dead in the physical world was forests, a place in which hunts would occur and hunting whistles would then commonly be used.
