= Niombo =

Niombo are fabric funerary mannequins, or fabric sarcophagi, used by the Bwemde people during the late nineteenth and early twentieth century.

== Meaning ==
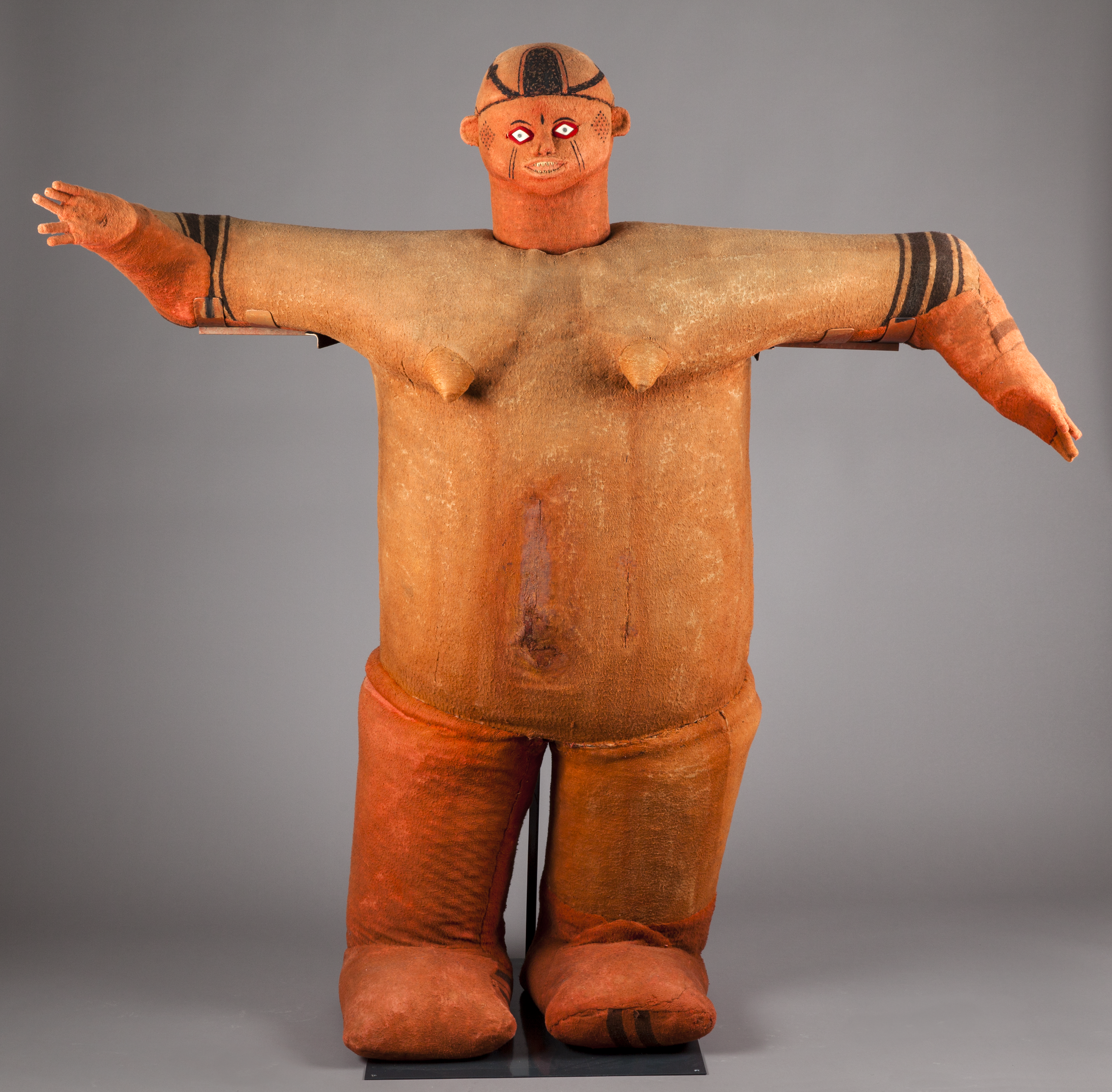
Niombo, Museum of World Culture, Sweden

The use of Niombo as anthropomorphic coffins in Bwemde funerary rituals is tightly linked to the cultural significance of textiles in the Kongo Kingdom. As a way to merge the human body with textiles, Niombo became an honorific mummification for important members of the community, commemorating their passage into the world of the dead. The time and effort spent on the creation of the Niombo, as well as the quantity of cloth required, were a sign of respect towards the dead.

The cloths used to build the Niombo were offered by the community, but could come from a wide variety of sources. From mats, traditional raffia, to imported linens, cotton prints, sheets, silk or even wool blankets collected via trading with Europeans, both the quantity and quality of these fabrics served as representations for the prestige and power of the elder being commemorated.

The practice, although it arose in the late nineteenth century from a long tradition of Bwemde funerary rituals aiming to preserve parts of human bodies through relics, came to an end in the 1930s, likely due to its costly nature.

One of the most well-known Niombo maker in the Western world was named Makosa, or Makoza, and began producing replicas to be sold in Europe in the beginning of the 20th century.

== Funerary Ritual ==
The preparation of the body leading up to the funeral could be a very lengthy process, taking anywhere from several months to a year.

After their death, the elder's body was left to rest on their bed for one or two nights, giving time for their closest family members and acquaintances to weep. After this time, the mummification process would begin. Expert Niombo-makers would be invited to take notes of any physical particularity of the deceased, whether that was tattoos, markings or filed teeth. The body would be placed above a fire to be smoked, keeping the fire burning day and night until the corpse completely dries out. This process provided enough time for fabrics and cloths to be collected.

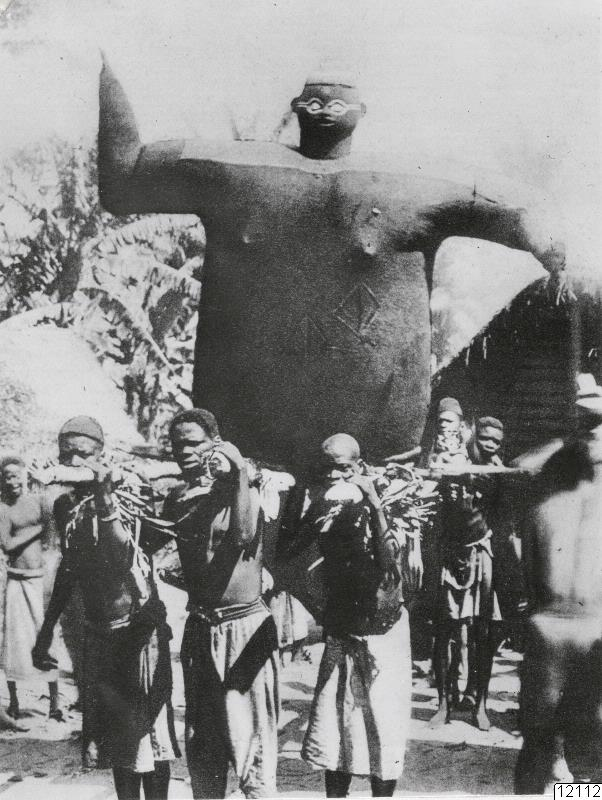
Photography taken during a Niombo Procession, Museum of World Culture, Sweden

Once the body was dried enough, the swathing could begin. First, the body would be wrapped in raffia cloth mats. The frame of the Niombo would be shared and reinforced by canework placed round the body. Those would come to form the trunk, arms and legs of the figure. More fabrics would then be wrapped around the structure, creating a massive bundle and eventually leading the Niombo to take shape. The final layer of cloths added to the Niombo would always be red. At the end of the process, the Niombo could be over 3 meters high. The body now shaped, the head could be placed on top. Also made of fabric, the head would be stuffed with soft grasses and cotton. To finish the sarcophagi, details would then be painted on with black and white paint – patterns on the body, face and markings found on the deceased – transforming the Niombo into a portrait of the person it enclosed. The grave would be dug during the shroud's creation. This would be a lengthy process given that the Niombo would be buried standing.

Prior to the burial, a procession would take place over several nights and across several villages. The Niombo would be carried standing on a stretcher, followed by an orchestra and a crowd that has been estimated by some to be composed of sometimes hundreds of people. Through the procession, dancing, singing and joking would build a great fervor in the crowd. The corpse would be carried for a few steps and then placed down. Sometimes making jokes by making it turn around, as if it had wanted to go back to its home rather than be brought towards its burial grounds.

On the day of the burial, the dancing would stop. As the Niombo was placed in its resting-place and its feet touched the bottom of the grave, the crowd would jump in the air and let out a great cry. Their elder would now have finally entered the world of the dead.

== Symbolism ==
As a commemoration to an illustrious member of the community, the Niombo gathers a variety of symbolic elements that represent the status of the deceased, their position and the role they now have to play in the world of the dead.

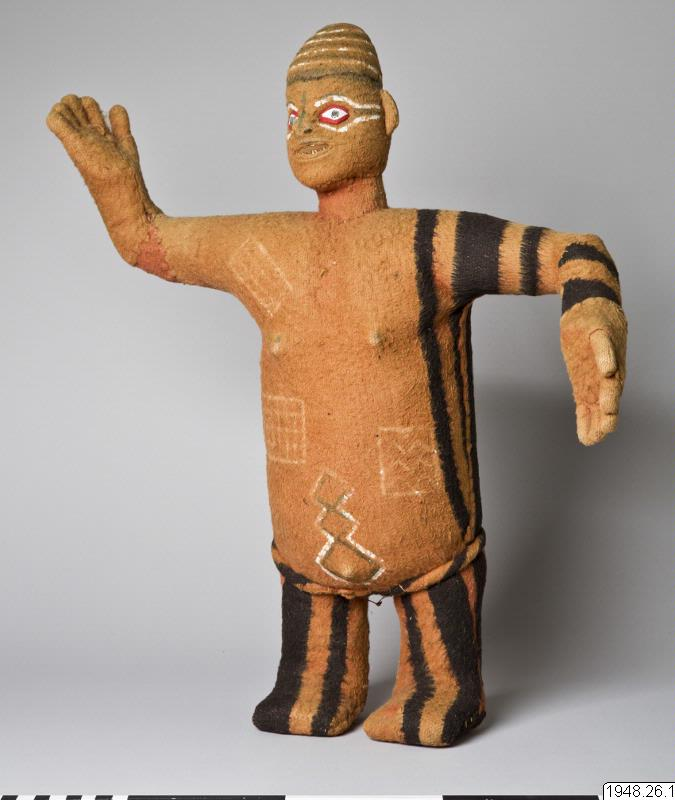
Niombo, Museum of Ethnography, Sweden

The mannequin is standing with its right arm raised and left arm lowered. In Kongo spiritual beliefs, this stance echoes the cross, an important symbol for crossroads, a place where the world of the dead meets the world of the living. This serves to reinforce the belief that the Niombo will act on the behalf of the community when dealing with the spirits of the other world.

The fabric used on the outermost layer of the Niombo is red. This colour, virtue of being neither black nor white, escapes the duality associated with the two opposing colours and comes to represent the colour of intuition. It symbolizes the mediation between the worlds.

On some Niombo, leopard-like prints could also be found. Those would be used as a way to represent the royal power of the deceased. Other prints used on the Niombo could include lozenges. As a metaphor in Kongo and Bantu religions for the four corners of existence, the inclusion of this symbol could be associated with the idea that the deceased has lived through all the milestones of life and now governs over both the clan and their relatives in the other world.

The head of the Niombo would often feature an open mouth. This was once again pointing to the mediating role of the elder having passed away. The mouth would be left open so that the speech of the deceased could convey the words of those living in the world of the dead.
