= Syndicat professionnel des commerçants et transporteurs africains du Congo =

Employers' organization in Moyen-Congo

Syndicat professionnel des commerçants et transporteurs africains du Congo was an employers' organization in Moyen-Congo. It was formed by African employers, as an alternative to the French-dominated COLPAEF. Ayina was the president of the organization.
