= Agadir Crisis =

1911 diplomatic crisis

- Part of the causes of World War I
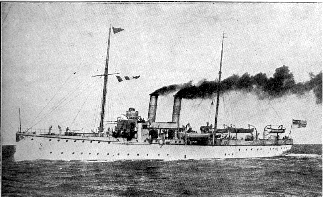
- SMS Panther in the Bay of Agadir
Date	July–November 1911
Location	Agadir, Morocco
Result	Morocco–Congo Treaty
Territorial changes	France cedes territories of French Equatorial Africa to Kamerun (Neukamerun); Germany cedes a small territory of Kamerun to French Chad

Belligerents
France; United Kingdom; Spain	Germany

Commanders and leaders
(United Kingdom of Great Britain and Ireland) Sir Edward Grey; (United Kingdom of Great Britain and Ireland) David Lloyd George	(German Empire) Alfred von Kiderlen-Waechter

The Agadir Crisis, Agadir Incident, or Second Moroccan Crisis, was a brief crisis sparked by the deployment of a substantial force of French troops in the interior of Morocco in July 1911 and the deployment of the German gunboat SMS Panther to Agadir, a Moroccan Atlantic port. Germany did not object to France's expansion but demanded "territorial compensation" for itself. Berlin threatened warfare, sent a gunboat and stirred up German nationalists. Negotiations between Berlin and Paris resolved the crisis on 4 November 1911: France took over Morocco as a protectorate in exchange for territorial concessions to German Cameroon from the French Congo.

In Britain, David Lloyd George, then Chancellor of the Exchequer, made a dramatic "Mansion House" speech on 20 July 1911—with the consent of prime minister H. H. Asquith and Foreign Secretary, Sir Edward Grey, bypassing the non-interventionist majority in the Cabinet—that denounced the German move as an intolerable humiliation. There was talk of war and Germany backed down; relations between Berlin and London worsened and the British moved closer to France. Berlin felt humiliated and began to realise that it was operating with few allies and antagonising multiple potential adversaries.

== Background ==
France's pre-eminence in Morocco had been upheld by the 1906 Algeciras Conference, following the First Moroccan Crisis of 1905–06. France and Germany agreed on 9 February 1909 that while France would have exclusive political control, the two nations would uphold each other's economic interests in Morocco. In 1911 they forced the sultan to sign a new treaty wherein he promised not to sign any other treaties without French approval, arguably violating the earlier made agreements.

Germany's move was aimed at testing the relationship between Britain and France, and possibly intimidating Britain into an alliance with Germany. Germany was also enforcing compensation claims for acceptance of effective French control of Morocco.

== Events ==
=== Moroccan Rebellion ===
In 1911, a rebellion broke out in Morocco against Sultan Abd al-Hafid. The French—after forcing the Sultan to request their assistance—prepared to send troops to help put down the rebellion under the pretext of protecting European lives and property in Fèz. Actual danger to European communities was remote: the rebellion broke out deep in the interior. They dispatched a flying column at the end of April. On 8 June, the Spanish deployed troops to occupy Larache and Ksar el-Kebir, fearing a French annexation of the country.

=== German naval intervention ===
Joseph Caillaux, then French minister for Finance, assured German diplomats in May 1911 that "France would be prepared, if the Germans recognised its vital interest in Morocco, to make concessions elsewhere". On 19 June, France agreed to start negotiations. After ten days, they still had not responded. It was then that Kiderlen-Waechter, the German Foreign Minister, asked Kaiser Wilhelm II for permission to send a gunboat, having rejected the need to send two ships out of belief that the French would be quickly willing to negotiate.

On 1 July, the German gunboat SMS Panther arrived at the port of Agadir, under the pretext of protecting German trade interests. The larger Bremen-class cruiser SMS Berlin came days later, replacing the gunboat. A German civilian, Hermann Wilberg, 110 kilometres (70 mi) to the north, was sent south to Agadir to provide a pretext for the arrival of the Panther, but he only reached Agadir three days after the ship had arrived. There was an immediate reaction from the French and the British.

=== German financial crisis ===
In the midst of this crisis, Germany was hit by financial turmoil. The stock market plunged by 30 percent in a single day, the public started cashing in currency notes for gold, and there was a run on the banks. The Reichsbank lost a fifth of its gold reserves in one month. It was rumoured that the French finance minister had orchestrated this crisis. Faced with the possibility of being driven off the gold standard, the Kaiser backed down and let the French take over most of Morocco.

=== Negotiations ===
On 7 July, the German ambassador in Paris informed the French government that Germany had no territorial aspirations in Morocco, and would negotiate for a French protectorate on the basis of "compensation" for Germany in the French Congo region and the safeguarding of her economic interests in Morocco. The German terms, as presented on 15 July, while containing an offer to cede the northern part of Kamerun and Togoland, demanded from France the whole of the French Congo from the Sangha River to the sea, to which was later added the transfer of France's right to the preemption of the Belgian Congo.

On 21 July, David Lloyd George delivered a speech at the Mansion House, London in which he declared that national honour was more precious than peace: "If Britain is treated badly where her interests are vitally affected, as if she is of no account in the cabinet of nations, then I say emphatically that peace at that price would be a humiliation intolerable for a great country like ours to endure." The speech was interpreted by Germany as a warning that she could not impose an unreasonable settlement on France.

On 4 November, secret Franco-German negotiations between Caillaux and the Germans led to a convention referred to as the Franco-German Accord, under which Germany accepted France's position in Morocco in return for territory in the French Equatorial African colony of Middle Congo (now the Republic of the Congo), as outlined in the Morocco–Congo Treaty. This 275,000 km^{2} (106,000 sq mi) territory, known as Neukamerun, became part of the German colony of Kamerun. The area is partly marshland (where sleeping sickness was widespread) but gave Germany an outlet on the Congo River. Germany ceded to the French colony of Tchad a small area of territory to the southeast of Fort Lamy (now part of Chad).

French premier Caillaux's negotiations with the Germans were leaked, causing him to fall from office on 21 January 1912, after a term of only seven months. In Germany, the Franco-German accord was also criticised—especially by the nationalist press—for giving Germany too little.

=== British involvement ===
The initial reaction in London was cautious: the Liberal government in Cabinet felt that France was largely responsible for triggering the crisis and ought therefore be urged to give ground. The British government attempted to restrain France from adopting hasty measures and to dissuade her from sending troops. In April, the Foreign Secretary Sir Edward Grey wrote: "what the French contemplate doing is not wise, but we cannot under our agreement interfere". When Cabinet authorised Grey to inform the French that Britain might accept a German presence in Morocco on 19 July, the French government replied angrily that any such acceptance would breach the 1904 Anglo-French Agreement.

The prospect of a German naval port on the Atlantic, however, allowed Grey to secure Cabinet's approval on 21 July to inform the German ambassador that Britain would respond forcefully to defend its interests. Britain sent battleships to Morocco, in case war broke out. As in the First Moroccan Crisis, British support of France showed the strength of the Entente Cordiale.

Divisions, however, became clear between the supporters of the entente (Grey, Lloyd George and Asquith especially) and the non-interventionists (who made up a majority of the Cabinet). Lloyd George delivered the Mansion House speech on 21 July 1911, bypassing the Liberal non-interventionists in Cabinet. Viscount Morley, secretary of state for India, denounced the speech as an 'unwarranted and unfortunate provocation to Germany'; Lord Loreburn, the Lord Chancellor, entreated Grey to take a non-interventionist stance and disavow the speech. Later in the year, there was a backbench revolt against Grey, which was unsuccessful.

== Aftermath ==
Scramble for Africa. Areas of Africa controlled by European colonial powers in 1913: Belgium (yellow), United Kingdom (salmon), France (blue), Germany (turquoise), Italy (green), Portugal (purple) and Spain (pink) empires. The only independent states were Liberia and Ethiopia (grey).

One consequence of the crisis was that the French viewed German policy as motivated by bluff: Raymond Poincaré, the premier succeeding Caillaux in early 1912, observed that 'whenever we have adopted a conciliatory approach to Germany... she has abused it; on the other hand, on each occasion when we have shown firmness, she has yielded', drawing the conclusion that Berlin would only understand a forceful response. Kissinger labels the risk-taking in this crisis used to appease the nationalism-inclined journalists and agitated public while disregarding the true interests at stake elsewhere as "strategic frivolity".

American historian Raymond James Sontag argued in 1933 that it was a comedy of errors that became a tragic prelude to the First World War:

The crisis seems comic—its obscure origin, the questions at stake, the conduct of the actors—indeed was comic. But the results were tragic. Tensions between France and Germany and between Germany and England have been increased; the armaments race received new impetus; the conviction that an early war was inevitable spread through the governing class of Europe.

With Sultan Abd al-Hafid's capitulation and signing of the Treaty of Fes (30 March 1912), France established a full protectorate over Morocco, ending what remained of that country's formal independence. British backing of France during the crisis reinforced the Entente between the two countries (and with Russia as well), increasing Anglo-German estrangement, deepening the divisions which would culminate in the First World War.

This incident led Britain's Home Secretary Winston Churchill to conclude the Royal Navy must convert its power source from coal to oil, to preserve its supremacy. Until then, the locally abundant coal was favoured over imported oil (mostly from Persia), but the speed and efficiency offered by oil convinced him that "Mastery itself was the prize of the venture." Subsequently, Churchill was asked by Prime Minister H. H. Asquith to become First Lord of the Admiralty, which he accepted.

The crisis led Britain and France to conclude a secret naval agreement by which the Royal Navy promised to protect the northern coast of France from German Navy attack, while France concentrated her fleet in the western Mediterranean and agreed to defend British interests there. France was thus able to guard her communications with her North African colonies, and Britain to concentrate more force in home waters to oppose the German High Seas Fleet. Britain also formed a Railway Executive Committee in order to rapidly mobilise in the event of a continental war.

German world historian Oswald Spengler was inspired by the episode to write his The Decline of the West. "The Agadir crisis of 1911, which suddenly raised the spectre of a general European war and strikingly revealed the danger of Germany's encirclement by the Entente, crystallised Spengler's nascent vision of the future international political transformation of the West."

During the First World War, in 1916, Neukamerun returned to France. The territory today forms part of Chad, Central African Republic, the Republic of the Congo, and Gabon. Established in 1912, the French protectorate in Morocco lasted until 1956.

== See also ==
- Causes of World War I
- First Moroccan Crisis
- International relations (1814–1919)
- Pact of Cartagena
- Anglo-German naval arms race
- French–German enmity
