= Justin Mikolo-Kinzonzi =

Justin Mikolo-Kinzonzi is a Congolese politician. He was Second Vice-president of the National People's Assembly of Congo-Brazzaville during the 1970s. From 2002 to 2011, he served in the Senate of Congo-Brazzaville, and during that time he was President of the Parliamentary Group of the Congolese Labour Party (PCT) in the Senate.

== Political career ==
An ethnic Beembe, Mikolo-Kinzonzi worked as a teacher and was Director of the Examinations Department at the Ministry of National Education in the early 1970s. He was elected to the National People's Assembly in the June 1973 parliamentary election. He was then elected as Second Vice-president of the National People's Assembly on 20 July 1973.

In July 2002, Mikolo-Kinzonzi was elected to the Senate as a PCT candidate in Bouenza Region. He was designated as President of the PCT Parliamentary Group in October 2002; with 32 members, it was the larger of the two Senate parliamentary groups, both of which were composed of supporters of President Denis Sassou Nguesso.

He was re-elected to the Senate in October 2005 as a PCT candidate in Bouenza Department. He received 57 votes from the electors, placing third and consequently winning the third of Bouenza's six available seats.

On the occasion of a visit by Sassou Nguesso to Bouenza in April 2009, Mikolo-Kinzonzi, as part of a delegation of Bouenza notables, urged Sassou Nguesso to run for re-election, promising that Bouenza would support him. He said that a gift from the delegation of five million CFA francs was intended for use as the bond that presidential candidates were required to pay. Although it was widely presumed that Sassou Nguesso would run again, he did not take the opportunity to confirm it, saying only that he was touched by the gesture.

At the PCT's Sixth Extraordinary Congress, held in July 2011, Mikolo-Kinzonzi was elected to the PCT's 471-member Central Committee. He was not, however, re-elected to the Senate in the October 2011 Senate election.

On 20 February 2013, Mikolo-Kinzonzi was elected as President of the PCT Committee of Honorary Members. The committee was intended to serve as an advisory body.
