= Beembe tribe (Kongo) =

Beembe
Total population
- 80 000

Regions with significant populations
- Congo

Languages
- Kibeembe and French

Religion
- Christianity

The Beembe (also Bembe, Babembe, Babeembe) are a Bantu people living in southern Congo-Brazzaville, precisely in Bouenza and in the cities of Brazzaville, Dolisie, and Pointe-Noire. It is a Kongo subgroup. The Beembe have some similar customs to the Kongo, which is what makes them a subgroup, but their art is what separates them apart. It is not clear when the Beembe separated from the Kongo but oral tradition suggests that it was some time around the eight century. They migrated Northeast from the Kongo and settled some five hundred kilometers from the capital of the Kingdom of the Kongo. This group was a part of the Kongo Kingdom during its height of power. The Beembe also have subgroups within it such as the Bisi-Nseke, Minkegue, Mmsumbu (Bambumbu), the Mongo, and the Musitu.Beembe society is economically based on agriculture.

This area, the Congo, was colonized by the French, also called the French Congo. The Beembe culture was not discovered and classified until the later part of colonization, and their artwork was not attributed to them until later. Their artwork was still shown throughout Europe, specifically France, where it was labeled as Sibiti. This was a term used for all sculpture of the region. It was used as an umbrella term for those who did not want to try and figure out what group the piece came from.

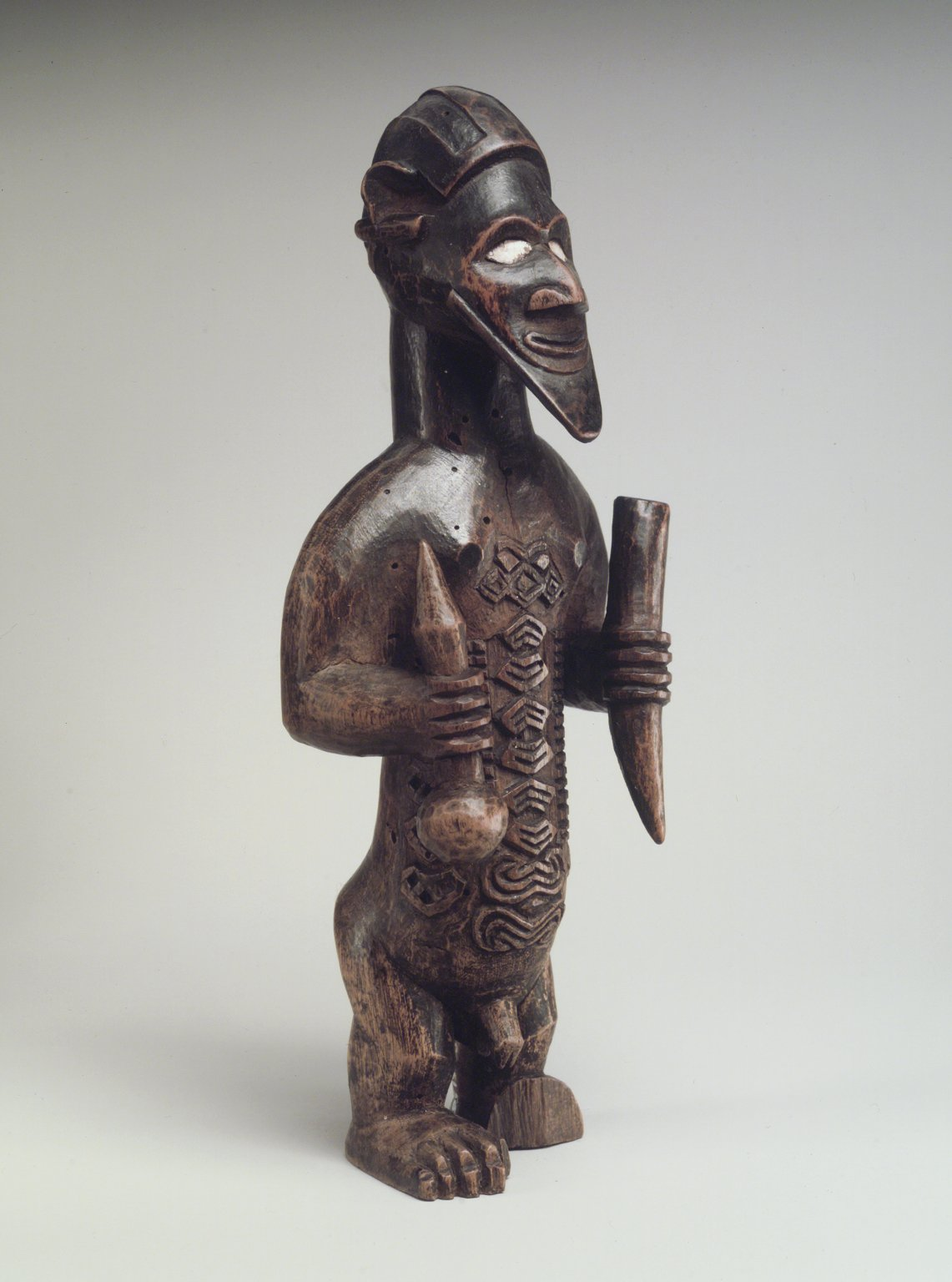
Male Figure (Bimbi), from the collection of the Brooklyn Museum

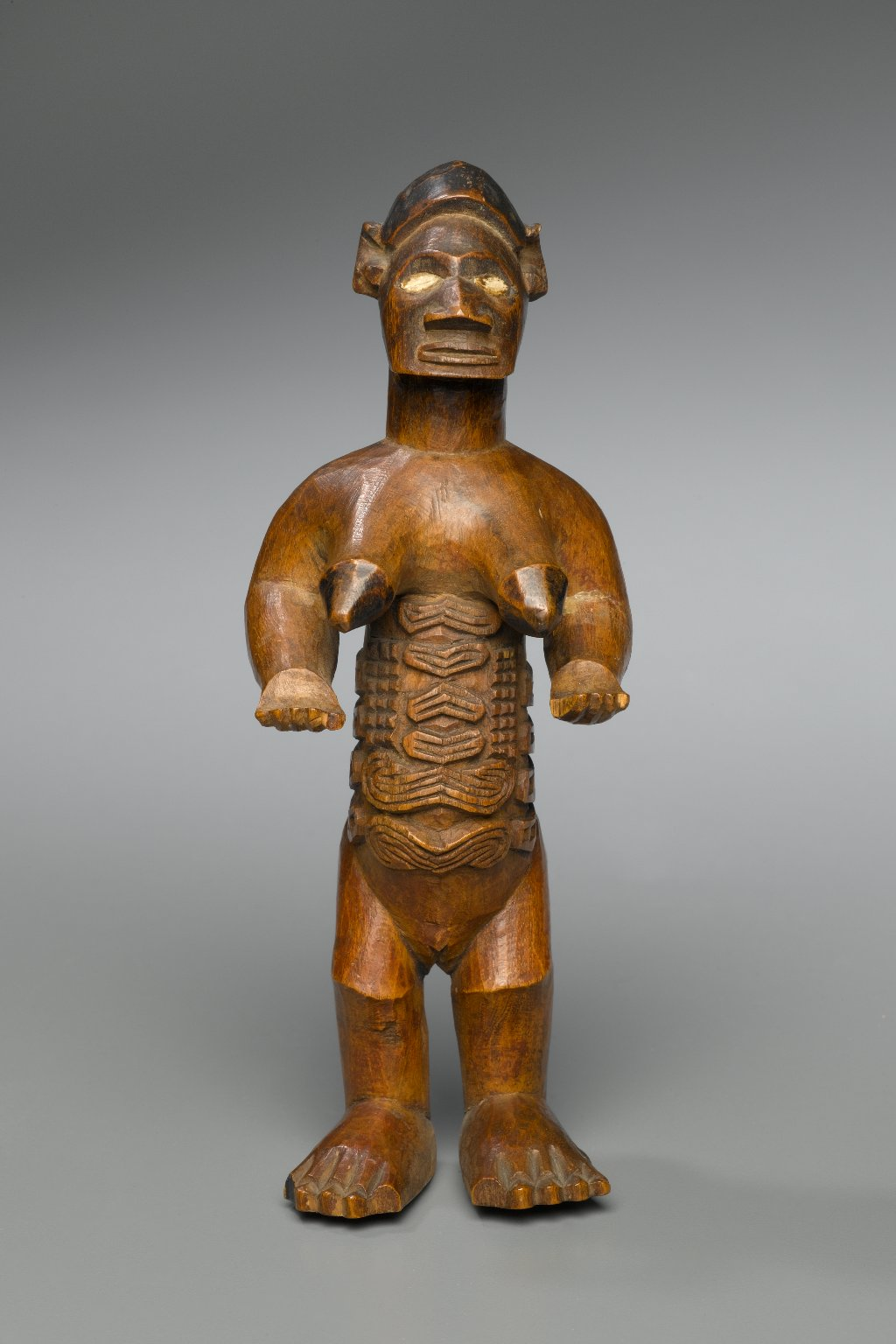
Female Figure (Bimbi), from the collection of the Brooklyn Museum

== Cultural traditions ==
Their social organization is based on the matrimonial clan, whose members could live in several villages. The family unit generally included three generations. The chief in charge of the village, the nga-bula, mediated with the ancestors.

Hunting was the main activity; before leaving on a hunt, the leader would invoke the ancestral spirits, using as intermediaries statuettes kneeling in the position of a hunter waiting for his prey. The Beembe believed in a creator god, Nzambi, whom they did not depict figuratively. He was the master of the life and death – unless the latter was due to the act of a sorcerer, ndoki, who could magically “eat” the life force of clan members. The ancestors had close ties with the living and received offerings through the “priest”, who made appeals to statuettes, the kitebi or bimbi, consecrated by the diviner. The ancestor worship among the Bembe is older, though, and precedes the use of magic statues, nkisi, by the sorcerers.

== Ancestral worship ==
Ancestors play an important role within Beembe society. Even after death, the spirits of their ancestors remain influential members of the family. The bombe ancestral devotion is directed towards the textile reliquary and to wooden ancestral sculptures. A person begins their ancestral journey with a funerary celebration. This celebration is where their spirits can get put into the muzidi. Their bodies would be shrouded and displayed within a textile shrine and a celebration known as Kitu, which includes song dance, and feasting is held in honor of the newly deceased. Funeral customs include high cryings and people throwing themselves onto the ground. At the end of the celebration the figure is placed within either the home of their family or within a special family enclosure. The Beembe funerary customs are similar to the Bwende (also Babwende) in their style and form of funerary rites

These ancestral figures are given prayers. The prayers are directed towards the ancestor but the figures help communicate with them. These prayers are about family prosperity, disease, livestock, or troubles at home A diviner can tell the person what the resentments are within the village that are causing the problem. Through this information the person can get a figure made to help solve their problems.

== Body Markings ==
Similar to most people within the Congo region, the Beembe decorate their bodies with scarification. Scarification was a sign of local beauty and belonging within the community. This custom was popular until around the 1950s but has almost disappeared today. Scarification markings can be seen represented on some Beembe figurines. There are three different common variations of markings. The most common marking is described as a V with a ^ on top of it. The second is a v or a ^ whose lines continue to out and into a broad curve. The third is a diamond shape stretching from the sternum to the hips.

== Music ==
Musical instruments used are relatively the same as those from the Kongo but with some exceptions. They have a small wooden drum called a mukonzi. A slightly larger but similar drum is the nkonko found among the Basundi. The mukonzi is about 72 cm in length with a handle. It is used with two drumsticks which are made of luwunga. Some communities have two mukonzi, which can be used at the same time. They represent a mother child relationship with the larger one called nigiri (mother) and the smaller one is called ngonglo mwana (little one).

Rattles are also found among the Beembe. There are different kinds one is a double-rattle used by younger people called a kitsarakara. This is made of two fruit shells bound together with a band of cloth. The inside of the sheets are rocks or seeds. The other type of hand held rattle is a calabash-rattle called a mukwanga. The mukwanga is used in comforting children. Since colonization the Bembe learned to make a new type of rattle using tin cans which are called ntengele. A staff-rattle was used as a symbol of peace between the Europeans and the Beembe. This staff-rattle was made of a staff about an average man height with cartridge case rattles attached to it.

== Beembe figures ==
The Beembe have a rich artistic practice that ties back to other Kongo Groups, through their figures. Similar to the nkisi figures of the Kongo, the Beembe create statuary that contains spirits. The Beembe's figures are some of their most well-known works. These figures are called Muzidi. The Muzidi are carved ancestral figures rendered typically in wood. These figures are carved to capture certain traits of the ancestor they are representing but are not realistic carvings of them. These figures are typically made in advance and sold after death to be used.

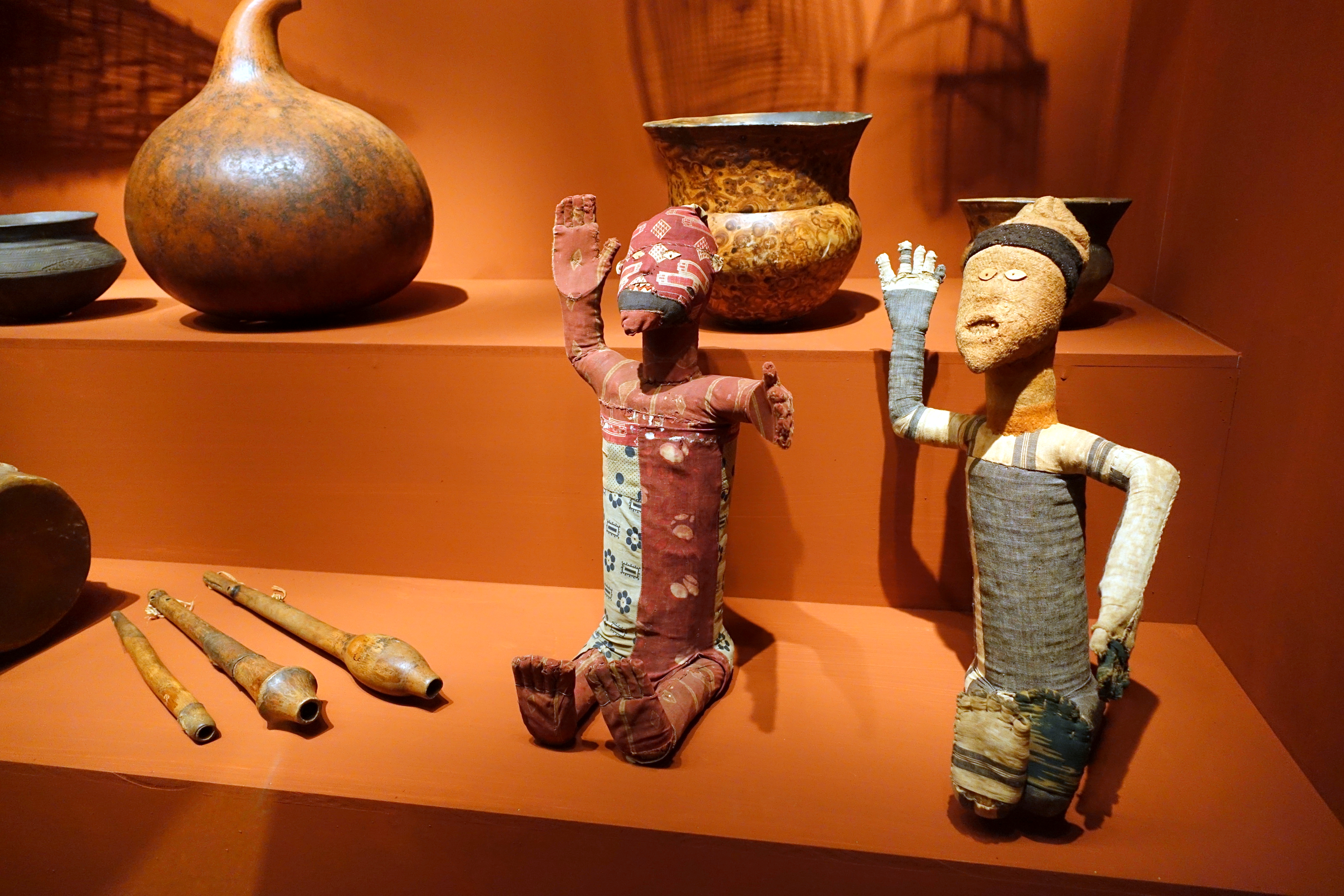
Center Figure: Reliquary Sculpture: Seat Male Figure Muzidi. Etnografiska Museet, Stockholm

The figures typically have common traits between them including large feet with slightly bent legs, a large head with a thick neck. The figures usually come in standing form but occasionally they will occur in a seated position. The hands of male sculptures are typically turned toward one another and are carrying implements that represent the ancestor's profession in life. Twenty-five different substyles have been identified within the Beembe figural sculpture work. Most figures would also have geometric design carved into them marking them with scarification. Different figures might have different elements that would be included to represent different beliefs about a person. White porcelain in the eyes would meant that the person had divination powers or powers to see into the spirit world. While Mango wood would mean that the figure had healing properties. Beembe sculptures vary from the Kongo nikisi in a couple different ways such as where the ancestor goes within the figure. In nikisi within the Kongo, the cavity in which the ancestor goes is housed within the stomach of the carving. In the muzidi, the cavity is housed between their legs. Within this cavity, medicine is placed as well as part of the ancestor which could include hair, nails, or skin.

Once the ancestor had been placed inside of the Muzidi, the cavity is sealed with either a wooden stoop or a piece of cloth to keep the spirit within the carving. These figures would then get wrapped in different textiles and then stuffed with banana leaves and other fibrous materials. The textiles used to wrap these figures has changed over time; originally, it was local raffia cloth which was dyed with red tukula dye. The textiles eventually shifted to the use of imported cottons.

The tradition of these representational figures is still widely used by the older generation, while some of the younger generations try to sell them to Westerners for money. The first carved wood Babemebe statuette to be exhibited in the Musee de l'Hommee in Paris was in 1932 and was presented by geologist Victor Babet. These statuettes represent the person in both form and spirit. They are treated and taken care of like family and are eventually passed down through generations. This relationship that they have with these figures and their ancestors is unlike the relationships of their neighboring communities. The figurines are difficult to date because objects that are old or no longer of any use are thrown-out because they are seen as dangerous as they once housed a spirit and could come back to life. The only wood figurines that get kept are the ones of the ancestors

== Bibliography ==
Decalo S., Thompson V. & Adloff R. 1984. Historical dictionary of Congo Pg 218-219. USA: The Scarecrow Press, Inc
