= History of rail transport in the Central African Republic =

The history of rail transport in the Central African Republic is limited to a now closed short railway line, and two proposed railway projects that were not implemented.

== Zinga–Mongo railway ==
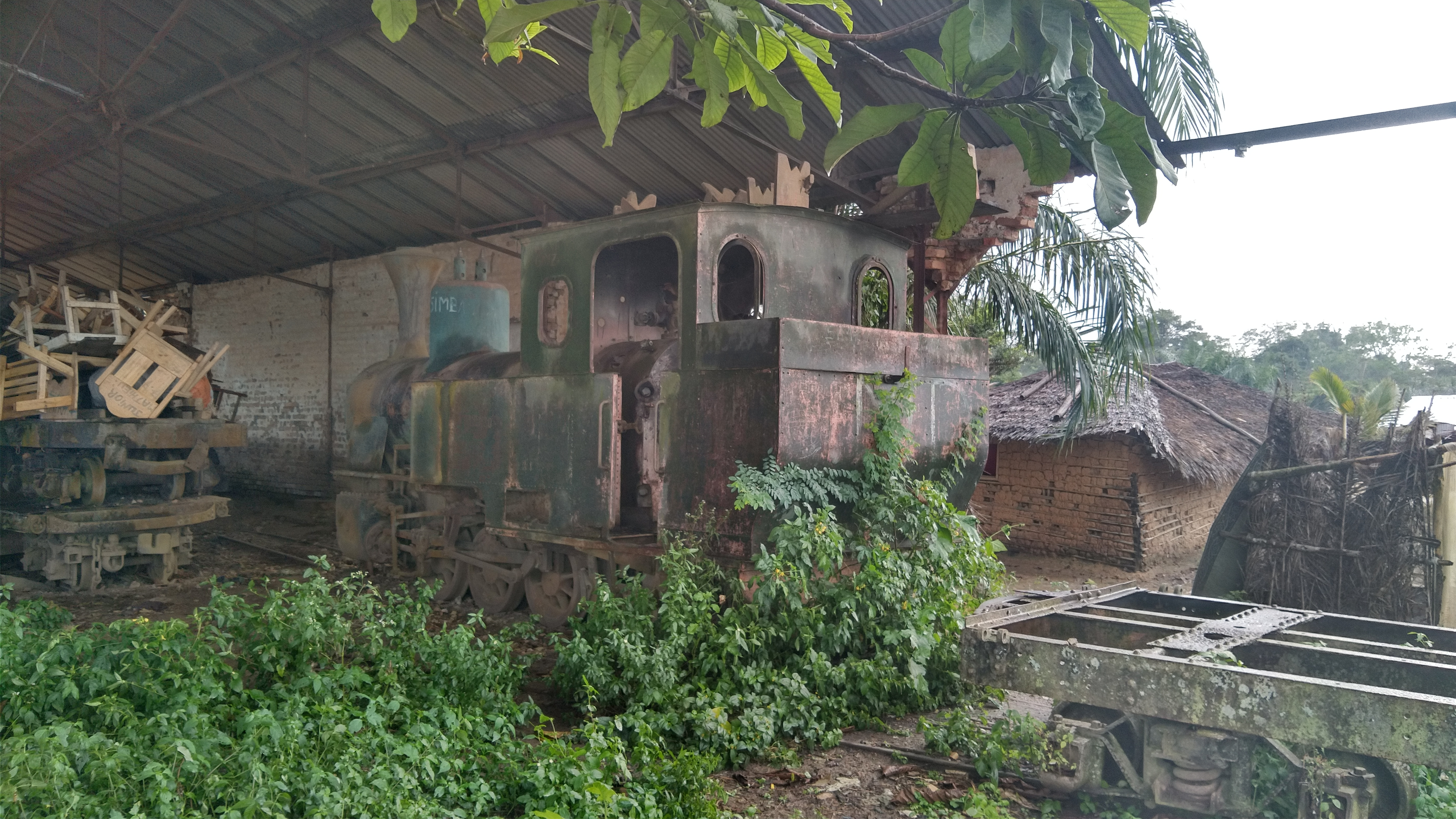
An abandoned locomotive in Zinga.

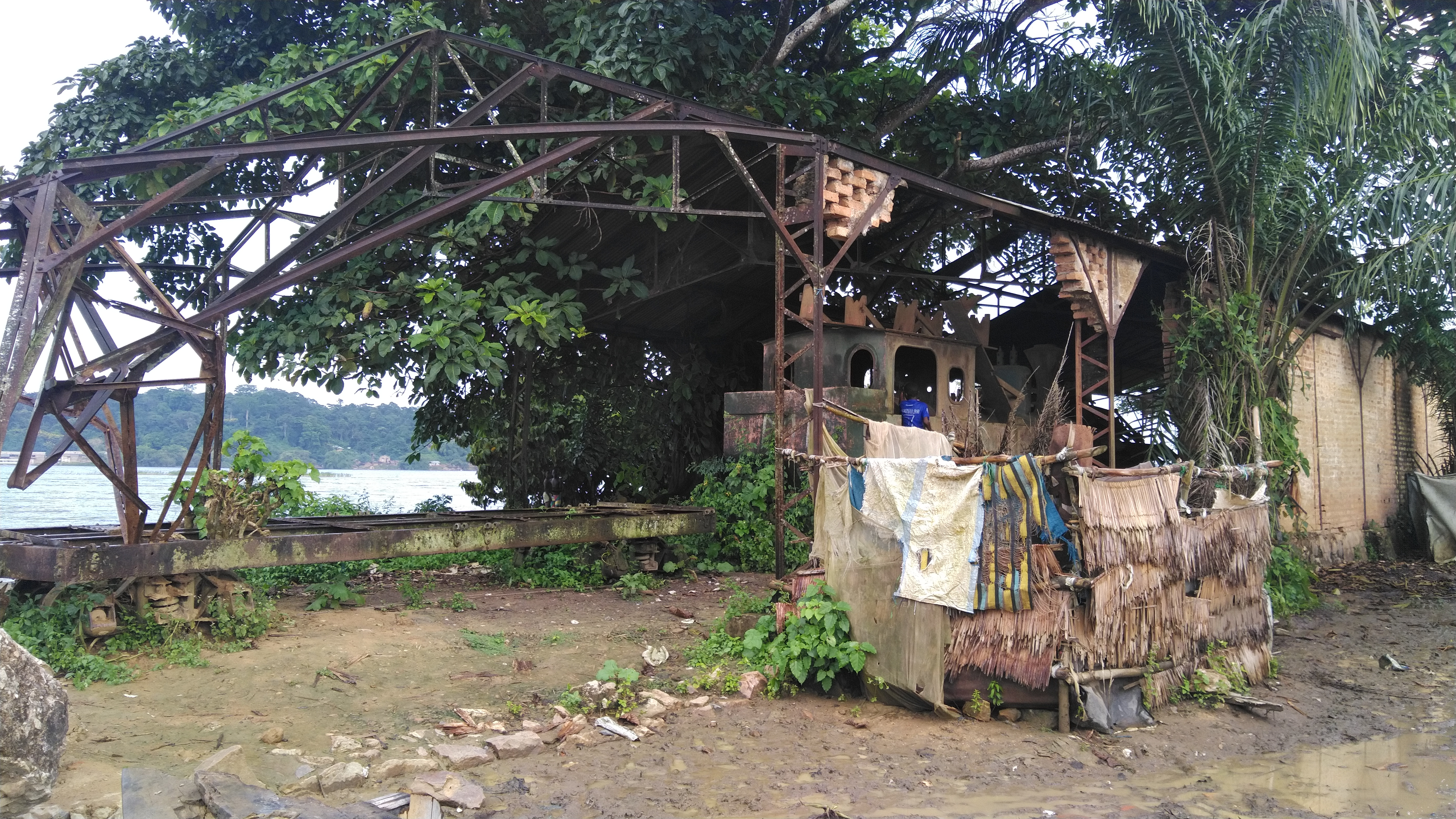
The abandoned train shed by the river in Zinga.

The only railway line ever to be built on the territory of the present-day Central African Republic ran from Zinga, Lobaye to Mongo. It was just 7.5 km (4.7 mi) long, and was in operation from 1930 until about 1960, when it was destroyed in the turmoil of the struggle for independence. Operation ended in 1962, when the construction of a 2.50 m deep channel to allow year-round navigation was finished after 13 years of work.

The Zinga–Mongo railway was constructed to 600 mm (1 ft 11 5/8 in) narrow gauge. Its operator was the Compagnie Générale de transport en Afrique Equatoriale.

On 11 April 2006, the remnants of the Zinga–Mongo railway were added to the UNESCO World Heritage Tentative List, in the Cultural category.

== Proposed Bangui–Port Lamy railway ==
In 1958, during the period of autonomy of the Central African Republic within the French Community (Communauté française), there were plans for a railway from Bangui to Fort Lamy (now N'Djamena) in Chad, a distance of about 870 km (540 mi). In the turmoil of the move towards independence, this project was abandoned.

== Proposed Kribi–Bangui railway ==
A line from the port of Kribi in Cameroon to Bangui was proposed in 2002.

== See also ==
- History of rail transport
- History of the Central African Republic
- Transport in the Central African Republic
