= Strategic frivolity =

Foreign policy concept promoted by Henry Kissinger

Strategic frivolity in foreign policy defines shortsighted political decisions that are not connected to the long-term interests of the country making those decisions. Henry Kissinger used the term in his book World Order (2014) while describing the policies that caused the First World War and remarked that "history punishes strategic frivolity sooner or later".

== Examples ==
Kissinger had introduced the notion of frivolity in his book Diplomacy (1994), describing the actions of the statesmen in the second half of the 19th century that eventually led to the First World War. In particular, he singled out the actions of Napoleon III, who considered the foreign policy of France as "an instrument he uses to secure his rule in France", per the words of Baron Hübner. "Frivolity is a costly indulgence of a statesman", and Napoleon quickly got trapped in the crises he manufactured without thinking through the long-term consequences; after antagonizing Russia by joining the Crimean War in 1853 and supporting the Polish Uprising in 1863, he found no support against the German assertiveness already in 1864 during the Second Schleswig War. The control over the power arrangements in Germany, enjoyed by France for centuries (since Cardinal Richelieu), was lost in a flash.

In World Order, Kissinger describes how diplomatic resolutions of the First Moroccan Crisis, the Second Moroccan Crisis, and the Bosnian Crisis created an impression that risk-taking to appease the nationalistically-inclined journalists and agitated public is a normal way of conducting the foreign policy. Statesmen became accustomed to pushing other major powers over issues of secondary interest, counting on diplomats to find ways to avoid actual wars. The overall European status quo actually was acceptable to all major powers (there were no territorial disputes in Europe with the exception of Alsace–Lorraine), yet it took just two weeks from Austria-Hungary's 10-point ultimatum to Serbia to a start of hostilities. Europe never recovered from this indulgence.

== In Russian politics ==
The expression, in its Kissinger's sense, was adopted by Russian political experts in the late 2010s. It was used to compare the situation in Europe in the beginning of the 21st century to the one before the Second Thirty Years' War (1914–1945) and to describe the actions of the major powers that were based on assumptions that a global war was impossible. In this worldview, all participants, including Russia, appear ready to carry long-term risks of ever-escalating wars to achieve short-term tactical results, as major wars are "mistakenly perceived as unthinkable", with Russia playing the game because the requests to take her interests into account are ignored otherwise.

Experts and the public in Russia are puzzled by seemingly random positions on foreign policy taken by the European Union and the United States. In their opinion, the European Union does not seem to accept a cause-and-effect link between the support for the Arab Spring and the 2015 European migrant crisis.

Political scientists like Timofei Bordachev guess that this state of affairs will persist for a long time as they perceive the United States to be incapable of accepting any change to the global order that does not look like an unquestionable victory. They expect the problem of frivolity to worsen and recommend China and Russia to prepare for the worst possible outcomes of strategic frivolity stance by their geopolitical rivals.

== Sources ==
- Kissinger, H. (2012). Diplomacy. Simon & Schuster UK. ISBN 978-1-4711-0449-7.
- Kissinger, Henry (2015). World Order. Penguin Publishing Group. ISBN 978-0-14-312771-0.
- Freedman, Lawrence (2015-01-02). "Power and Order". Survival. 57 (1): 171–176. doi:10.1080/00396338.2015.1008322. ISSN 0039-6338.
- Bordachev, Timofei V. (2018). "The Guns of April, Or the Return of Strategic Frivolity". Russia in Global Affairs (1, January/March).
- Lukyanov, Fedor (16 October 2017). "Исключения для исключительных /" [Exceptions for the Exceptional]. Russia in Global Affairs (in Russian).
- Karaganov, Sergei A.; Suslov, Dmitry V. (4 October 2018). "A new world order: A view from Russia". Russia in Global Affairs (in Russian).
- Karaganov, Sergey (2018). "The new Cold War and the emerging Greater Eurasia". Journal of Eurasian Studies. 9 (2): 85–93. doi:10.1016/j.euras.2018.07.002.
