= Comité de liaison de patronat de l'A.E.F. =

Comité de liaison de patronat de l'A.E.F. ('Liaison Committee of Employers of French Equatorial Africa', abbreviated COLPAEF) was an employers' organization in French Equatorial Africa (AEF). It had territorial branches in each of the four territories of AEF (Gabon, Moyen-Congo, Oubangui-Chari and Chad). COLPAEF was founded a few days after the introduction of the French Overseas Labour Code in 1953. The organization was affiliated to the Conseil national du patronat français (CNPF), the French National Employers Council. A Permanent Secretariat coordinated the activities of the four territorial branches of COLPAEF.

In Gabon, COLPAEF affiliates included SYCOMIMPEX-GABON (traders' and importers' syndicate), Syndicat professionnel des usines de sciage et de placages du Gabon (S.P.U.S.P.D.G.) and Syndicat forestier du Gabon ('Forestry Union of Gabon'), out of which the latter was the most important. In Moyen-Congo, Fédération des petites et moyennes entreprise ('Federation of Small and Medium-sized Companies', founded in 1952), Syndicat des entrepreneurs du bâtiment et des travaux publics ('Construction and Public Works Entrepreneurs Union', founded in 1957) and SYCOMIMPEX du Congo (founded in 1958) were members of COLPAEF.

COLPAEF was organizationally significantly weaker than its West African counterparts. The employers of French Equatorial Africa were generally highly individualistic, and often operated with little regard to the Labour Code. COLPAEF was entirely dominated by French people. Politically, the organization had limited influence. It came to accept decolonization in 1958, and in the Republic of the Congo the organization aided the newly formed government through trainings of some of its ministers.

COLPAEF later transformed into Union Interprofessionnelle de l'A.E.F. (UNIAEF). After AEF was dissolved, contacts between CNPF and Central African employers association continued through Comité d'etudes et de liaison du patronat d'outre-mer (CELPUF).
