= Morocco–Congo Treaty =

1911 treaty between France and Germany

The Morocco–Congo Treaty was signed on 4 November 1911 in Berlin between France and Germany to recognize French domination of Morocco. This event concluded the Agadir Crisis. In it, France ceded parts of the French Congo and French Equatorial Africa to Germany, comprising the Neukamerun.

== Sources ==
- "KAISER'S SON SHOWS ANGER AT TREATY". The New York Times. November 10, 1911.
