= List of concessionnaires of the French Congo =

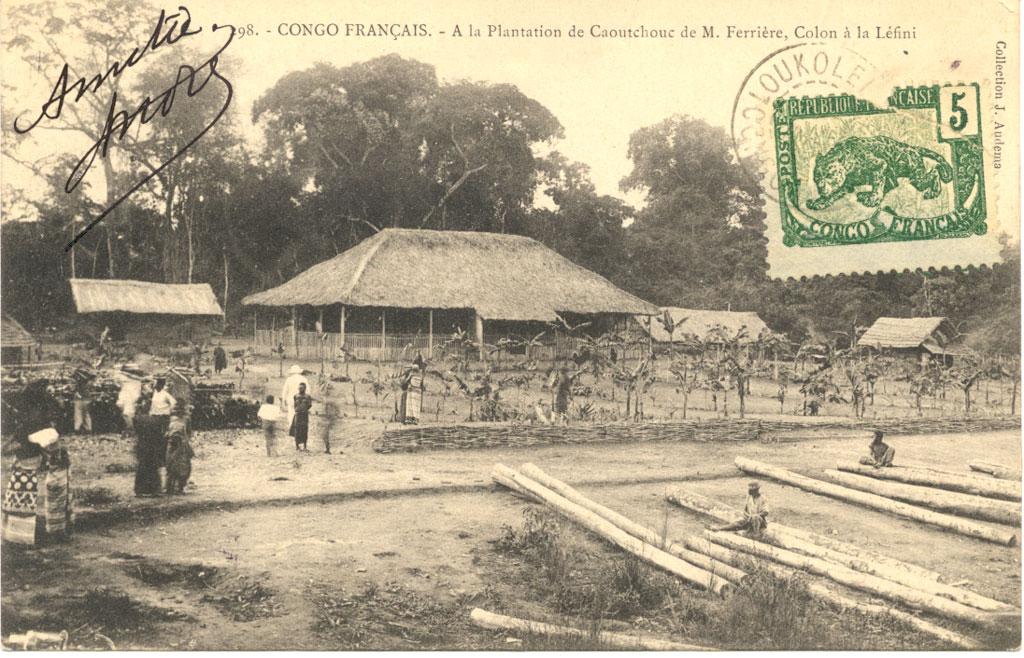
French Congo. "Mr. Ferrière's Rubber Plantation, settler on the Léfini". In the foreground, rubber trunks and workers in the background, c. 1905

In an attempt to develop the French Congo the government of France divided the territory in concessions for companies to develop. These several dozen companies controlled huge swaths of land, but had only limited success in trying to develop them. Most were merged into several larger companies that were more strictly controlled by the state after the French Congo was dissolved in 1906.

== List of companies ==
With the size of their concessions in km^{2}.

- Société agricole et commerciale de du Bas-Ogooué, 1200
- Société brettone du Congo, 2000
- Compagnie du Bavili-M'Banio, 2800
- Société de l'Ogooué-N'Gouiné, 3350
- Société coloniale du Baniembé, 3600
- Compagnie franco-congolaise de la Sangha, 3800
- Société de la K'Keni et N'Kémé, 3950
- Société des factoreries de N'Ddjolé, 4200
- Compagnie de la Sangha, 5300
- Société de la Sangha équatoriale, 5490
- Société commerciale coloniale de la Mamberé-Sangha, 5600
- Société commerciale et agricole de la Kadéï-Sangha, 6500
- Compagnie française de l'Oubanghi-Ombella, 7000
- Compagnie de la Haute-N'Gounié, 7100
- Société de l'Ekela-Sangha, 7800
- Compagnie de la Mobaye, 8000
- Société de l'Ongomo, 8200
- Société de l'Afrique française, 9350
- Compagnie commerciale de Colonisation du Congo français, 12,400
- Société de la Kadéï-Sangha, 12,900
- Société de la Haut-Sangha, 13,050
- Compagnie agricole et coloniale et industrielle de la Léfini, 13,700
- Compagnie de la N'Goko Ouesso, 14,000
- Compagnie du Kouango français, 15,000
- Société de l'Ibenga, 15,000
- Compagnie du Kouango-Oubanghi, 15,300
- Société des établissments Gratry M'Poko, 16,500
- Compagnie générale du Fernand Vaz, 17,300
- Compagnie des produits de la Sangha Lipa-Ouesso, 18,000
- Société de la Setté Cama, 19,000
- Société agricole et commerciale de l'Alima, 20,200
- Compagnie française du Congo occidental, 21,700
- Compagnie des Caoutchoucs et produits de la Lobay, 32,400
- Société de l'Afrique équatorial, 33,850
- Compagnie française du Haut-Congo, 36,000
- Compagnie française du Congo, 43,000
- Société commerciale, industrielle, et agricole, du Haut-Ogooué, 104,000
- Société des Sultanats du Haut-Oubanghi, 140,000
