= Zinga, Lobaye =

Zinga
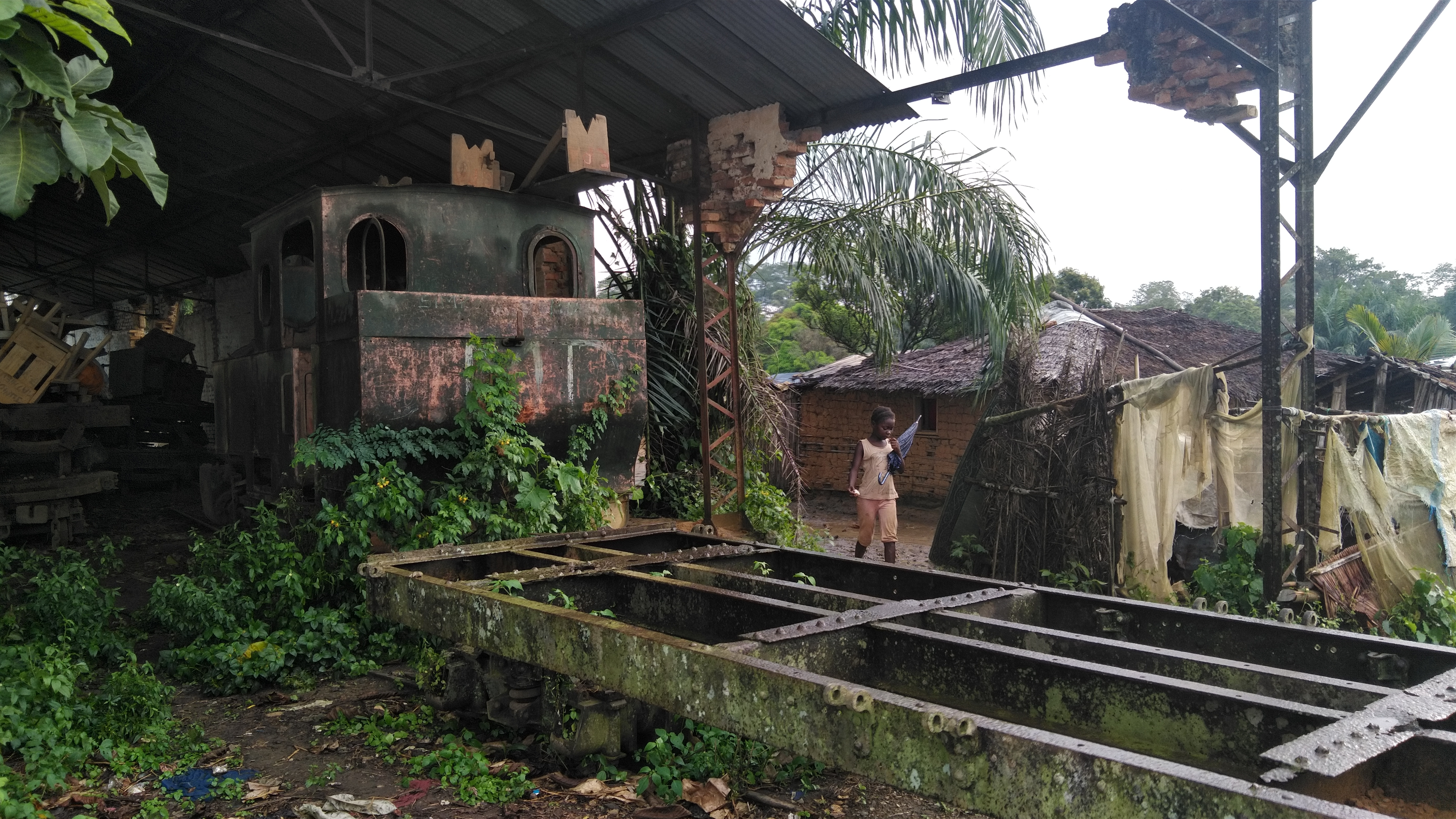
- Trainwreck in Zinga

- Location in Central African Republic
- Coordinates: 3°43′N 18°35′E
- Country: Central African Republic
- Prefecture: Lobaye
- Sub-prefecture: Mongoumba
- Commune: Mongoumba

Zinga is a town on the Oubangui River in the Central African Republic. The town stretches roughly 1 km long and 300 m wide. It is known for its wooden buildings and as a ferry port, from which boats sail to Bangui and Brazzaville.

== History ==
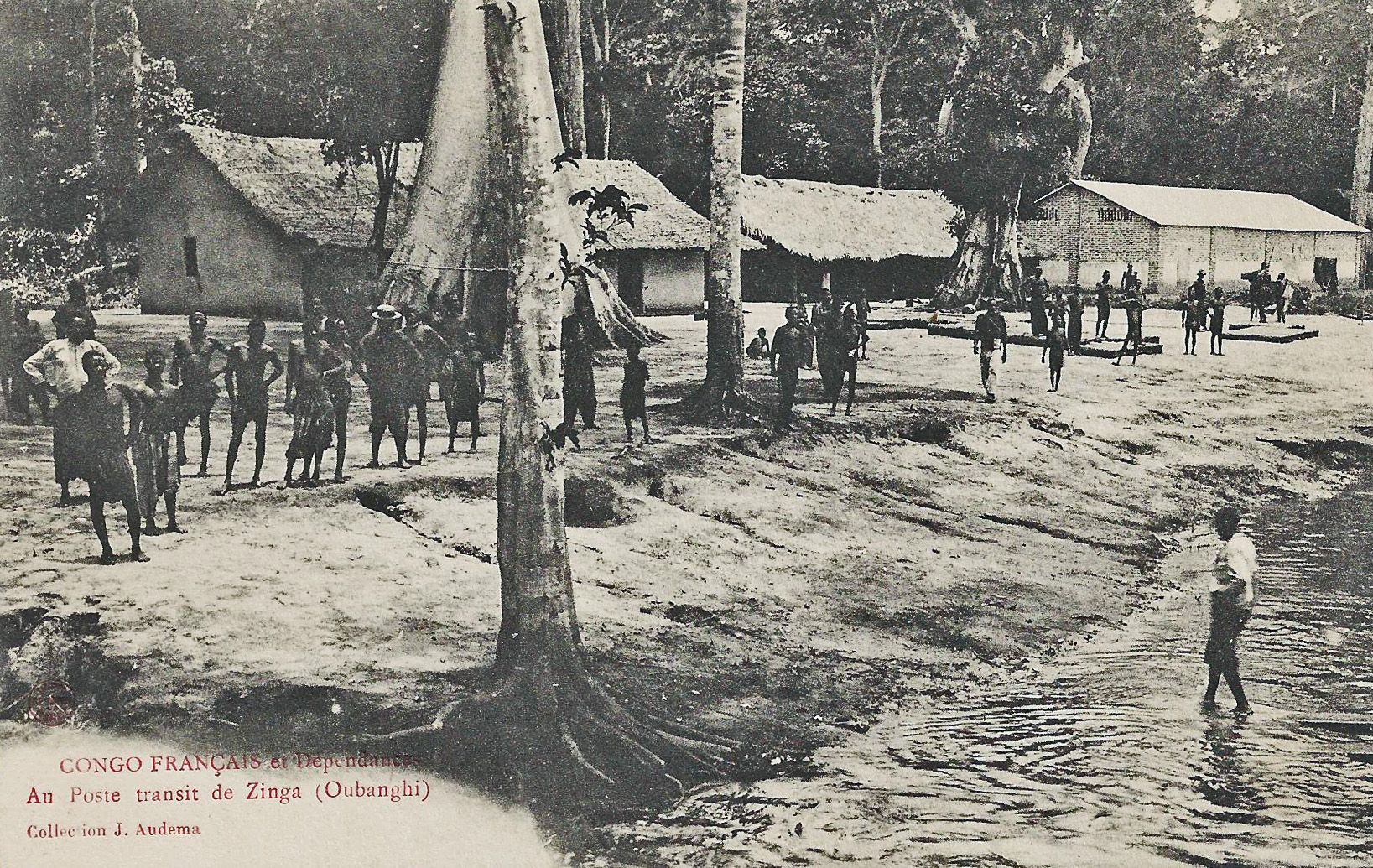
Zinga around 1900

France seized Zinga from Germany on 8 August 1914. In the 1920s, the French colonial government built a 6 KM railway line linking Zinga and Mongo. However, the railway stopped operating in 1960. The former railway was added to the UNESCO World Heritage Tentative List on April 11, 2006 in the Cultural category.

== Healthcare ==
Zinga has one health center.

== See also ==
- History of rail transport in the Central African Republic
