= Neukamerun =

German colonial territory ceded by France in 1911

Coordinates: 5°N 16°E

- Part of Kamerun
- 1911–1916
- Neukamerun
- Government
  - Type: Part of the Colony of Kamerun
- History
  - Established: 1911
  - Disestablished: 1916
Preceded by	Succeeded by
French Congo	French Equatorial Africa
- Today part of: Chad; Central African Republic; Republic of the Congo; Gabon

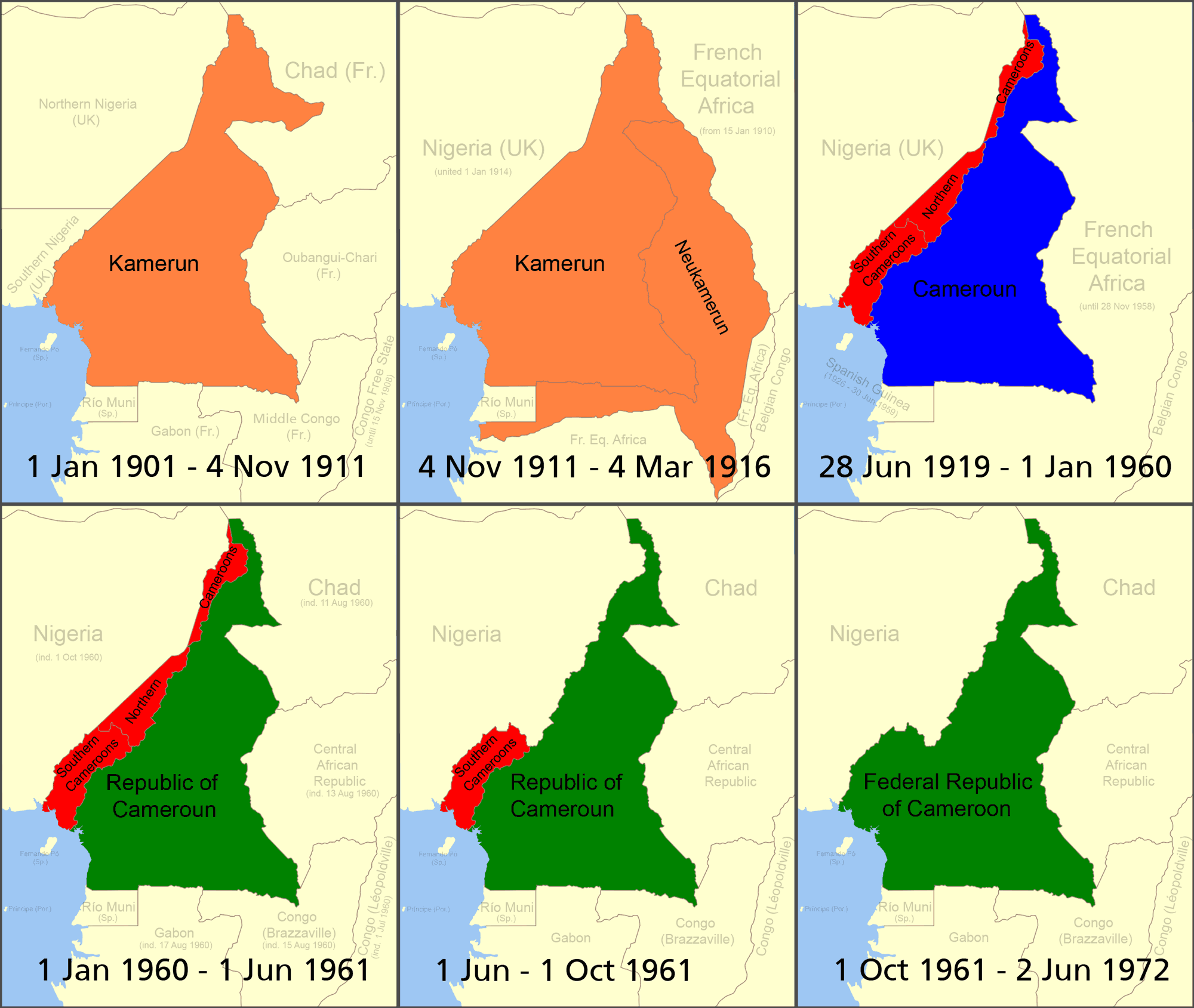
Cameroon, 1901–1972: Kamerun British Cameroons French Cameroon (Cameroun) Independent Cameroon (Cameroun)

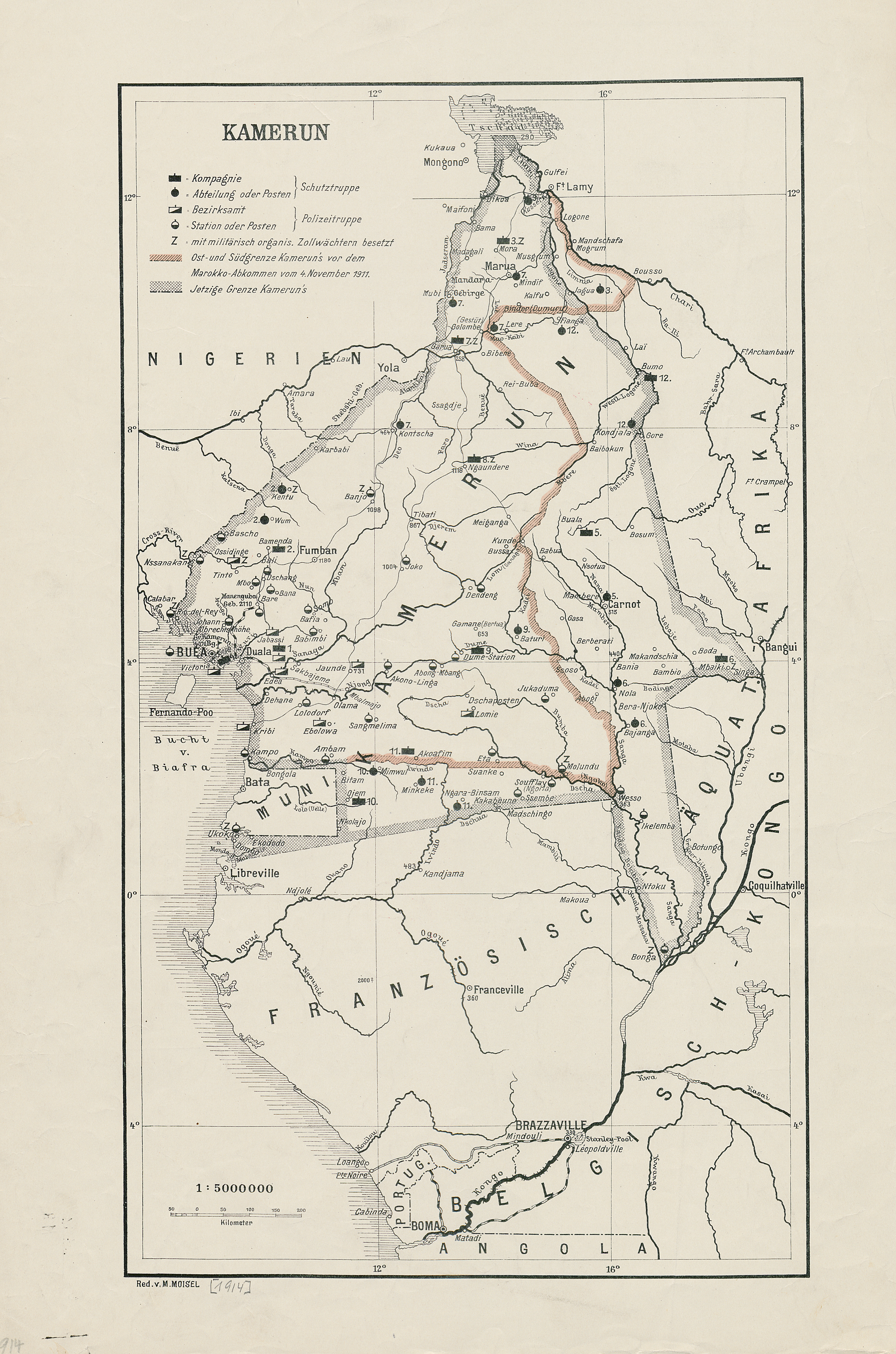
Contemporary map of Neukamerum, from 1914

Neukamerun was the name of Central African territories ceded by the Third French Republic to the German Empire in 1911. Upon taking office in 1907, Theodor Seitz, governor of Kamerun, advocated the acquisition of territories from the French Congo.

In 1911, the Agadir Crisis broke out over the question of French influence in Morocco. France and Germany agreed to negotiate on 9 July 1911, and on 4 November, they signed an agreement. In exchange for German recognition of France's rights to Morocco and a strip of land in northeastern Kamerun near Fort Lamy between the Logone and Chari rivers, France agreed to cede part of the French Congo to Germany. Germany's only major river outlet from its Central African possessions was the Congo River, and the Germans hoped that more territories to the east of Kamerun would allow for better access to that waterway.

Accordingly, Kamerun gained a connection to the Congo centered on the Sangha River and another to the Ubangi at the town of Zinga; a small strip of French territory lay enclosed by the two outlets. Also included was a strip from northern Gabon that resulted in the Spanish colony of Rio Muni becoming surrounded. In total, the Kamerun colony grew from 465,000 km^{2} to 760,000 km^{2}. Otto Gleim was governor of Kamerun at the time. The expanded colony became known as Grand Kamerun. The transfer took two years, and was completed when Ouham Region of Ubangi-Shari was transferred on June 1, 1913.

The exchange sparked debate in Germany; opponents argued that the new territories presented little opportunity for commercial exploitation or other profit. The German colonial secretary eventually resigned over the matter.

During World War I, France was eager to regain the territories. In 1916, France seized the territories after the fall of German forces in western Africa. After the war, France administered Cameroun as a League of Nations mandate which was distinct from French Equatorial Africa. Neukamerun ceased to exist as the boundary was placed back at its pre-1911 line (except for the strip of land between the Logone and Chari rivers, which remained part of French Equatorial Africa). The territory today forms part of Chad, the Central African Republic, the Republic of the Congo, and Gabon.
