= Bwende people =

Ethnic group in the Democratic Republic of Congo

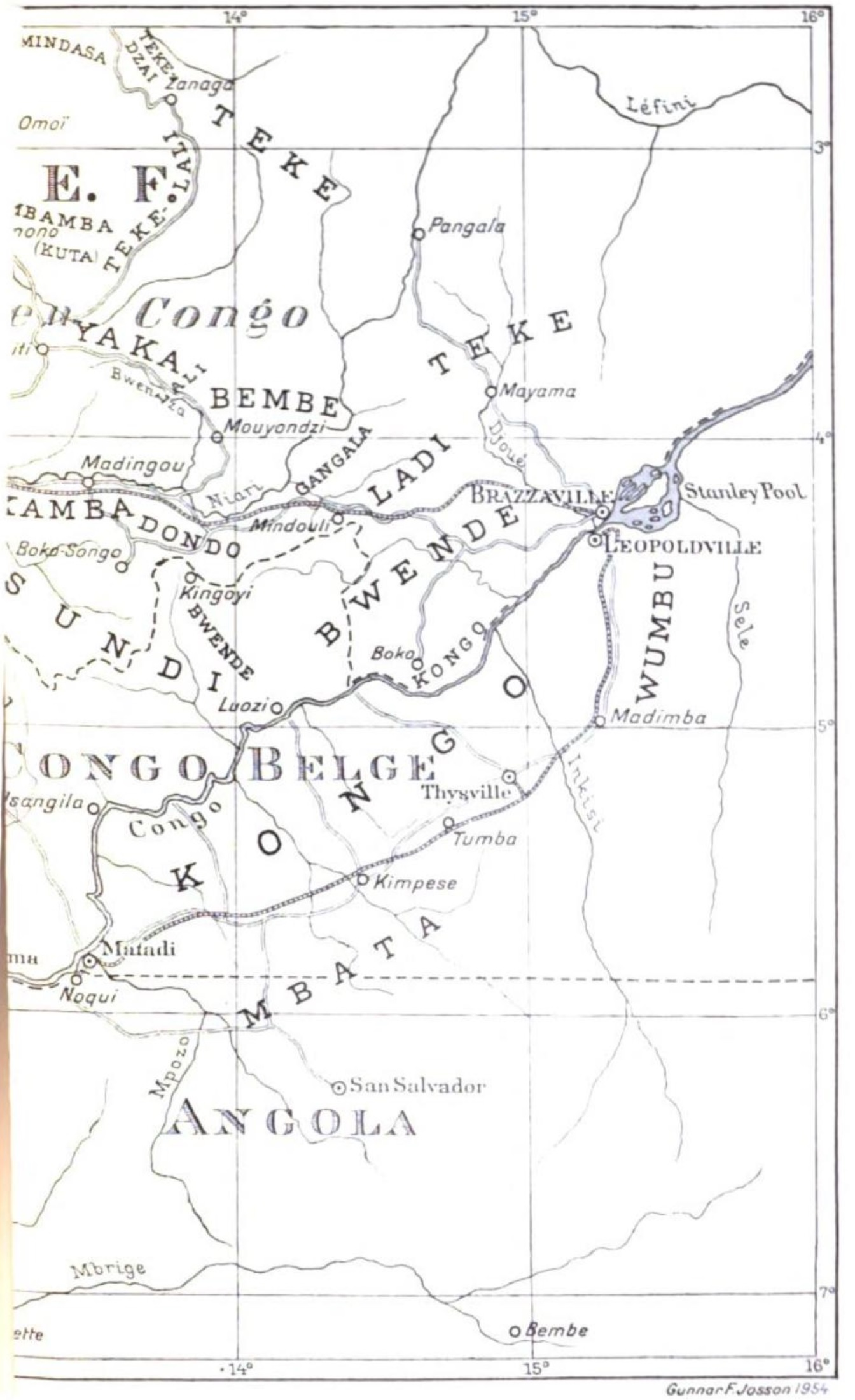
Map showing the area where the Bwende lives.

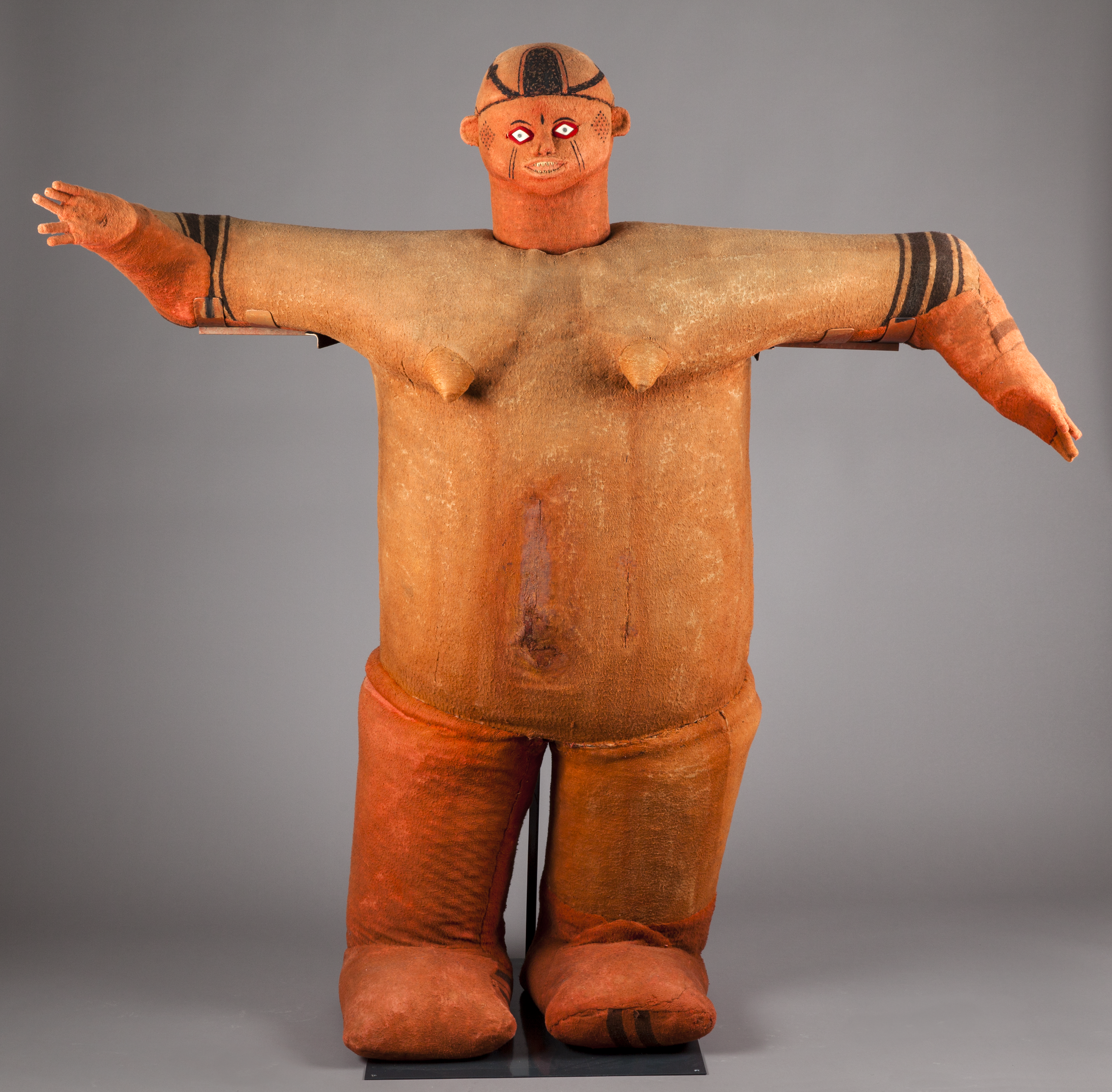
The niombo at the Museum of World Culture. This niombo was created by the Bwende artist Makoza from Kingoyi.

The Bwende people (also Babwende, Bweende, Buende, Babuende) are a Bantu ethnic group which inhabit a region across the borders of the Democratic Republic of the Congo and Republic of the Congo. They mainly inhabit the area north of the Congo river, between the rivers Luala and Kenke. They speak Bwende, a Bantu language related to Kikongo and were a part of the Kongo Kingdom.

== Art ==
=== Statuettes ===
The artistic expression of the Bwende has been strongly influenced by the Beembe, their neighbors to the northwest. However, the Bwende statuettes have some specific characteristics, such as broad shoulders, numerous body scarifications and a hairstyle that is sometimes asymmetrical. Wooden statuette with scrap metal inserts were used in the nkisi cult. These fetishes are considered to be very powerful: they are asked to identify a culprit as well as to cure an illness.

=== Niombo ===
The Bwende are famous for their large fabric funerary mannequins (niombo), in reality desiccated corpses swaddled in many layers of cloth. They are rarely seen in Western collections. However, in the Museum of World Culture in Gothenburg there is an impressive niombo, famous for its height, scope and reddish color. This was on display at the Eternal Ancestors: The Art of the Central African Reliquary exhibition held at the Metropolitan Museum. of Art in 2007. It was produced at the beginning of the 20th century in a Swedish mission in the Lower Congo.

=== Muzidi or Muziri ===
As with the Beembe, there are small reliquary statues also made of fabric (muzidi or muziri), which contain a few bones. Their size is between 40 and 80 cm. While beembe dolls are in a seated position, their bwende counterparts are depicted standing.
