= French Congo =

Former French colony in Central Africa

Coordinates: 1°S 16°E

French Congo Congo français (French)
- 1882–1910
- Flag

- Status: French colony
- Capital: Brazzaville
- Common languages: French (official); Fang, Myene, Kongo, Lingala
- Religion: Christianity, Bwiti, Islam, traditional religions
- History
  - Established: 1882
  - Renamed Middle Congo: 1903
  - Reestablished as French Equatorial Africa: 1910
- Currency: French franc
Preceded by
Kingdom of Kongo
Kingdom of Loango
Teke Kingdom
Succeeded by
French Equatorial Africa
- Today part of: Republic of the Congo

The French Congo (French: Congo français), also known as Middle Congo (French: Moyen-Congo), was a French colony which at one time comprised the present-day area of the Republic of the Congo and parts of Gabon, and the Central African Republic. In 1910, it was made part of the larger French Equatorial Africa.

The modern Republic of the Congo is considered French Congo's successor state, having virtually identical borders, and having inherited rights to sovereignty and independence from France through the dissolution of French Equatorial Africa in the late 1950s.

== History ==
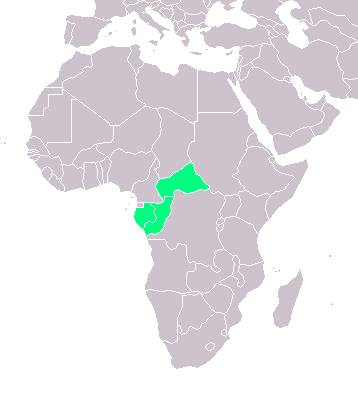
French Congo once comprised the area of Congo, Gabon and Ubangi-Shari (present-day Central African Republic)

The French Congo began at Brazzaville on 10 September 1880 as a protectorate over the Bateke people along the north bank of the Congo River. The treaty was signed between King Iloo I and Pierre Savorgnan de Brazza; Iloo I died the same year it was signed, but the terms of the treaty were upheld by his queen Ngalifourou. It was formally established as the French Congo on 30 November 1882, and was confirmed at the Berlin Conference of 1884–85. Its borders with Cabinda, Cameroons, and the Congo Free State were established by treaties over the next decade. The plan to develop the colony was to grant massive concessions to some thirty French companies. These were granted huge swaths of land on the promise they would be developed. This development was limited and amounted mostly to the extraction of ivory, rubber, and timber. These operations often involved great brutality and the near-enslavement of the locals.

Even with these measures most of the companies lost money. Only about ten earned profits. Many of the companies' vast holdings existed only on paper with virtually no presence on the ground in Africa.

The French Congo was sometimes known as Gabon-Congo. It formally added Gabon on in 1891, was officially renamed Middle Congo (French: Moyen-Congo) in 1903, was temporarily divorced from Gabon in 1906, and was then reunited as French Equatorial Africa in 1910 in an attempt to emulate the relative success of French West Africa.

In 1911 the Morocco-Congo Treaty gave part of the territory to Germany for an outlet on the Congo River. This land, known as Neukamerun, was officially regained by France after the First World War.

A 1906 study L'Expansion coloniale au Congo français, 'The colonial expansion of French Congo', was published in conjunction with the French Colonial Exposition in Marseille. In 1925 African-American historian, sociologist, and Pan-Africanist W. E. B. Du Bois wrote "'Batouala' voices it. In the depths of the French Congo one finds the same exploitation of black folk as in the Belgian Congo or British West Africa."

== List of governors ==
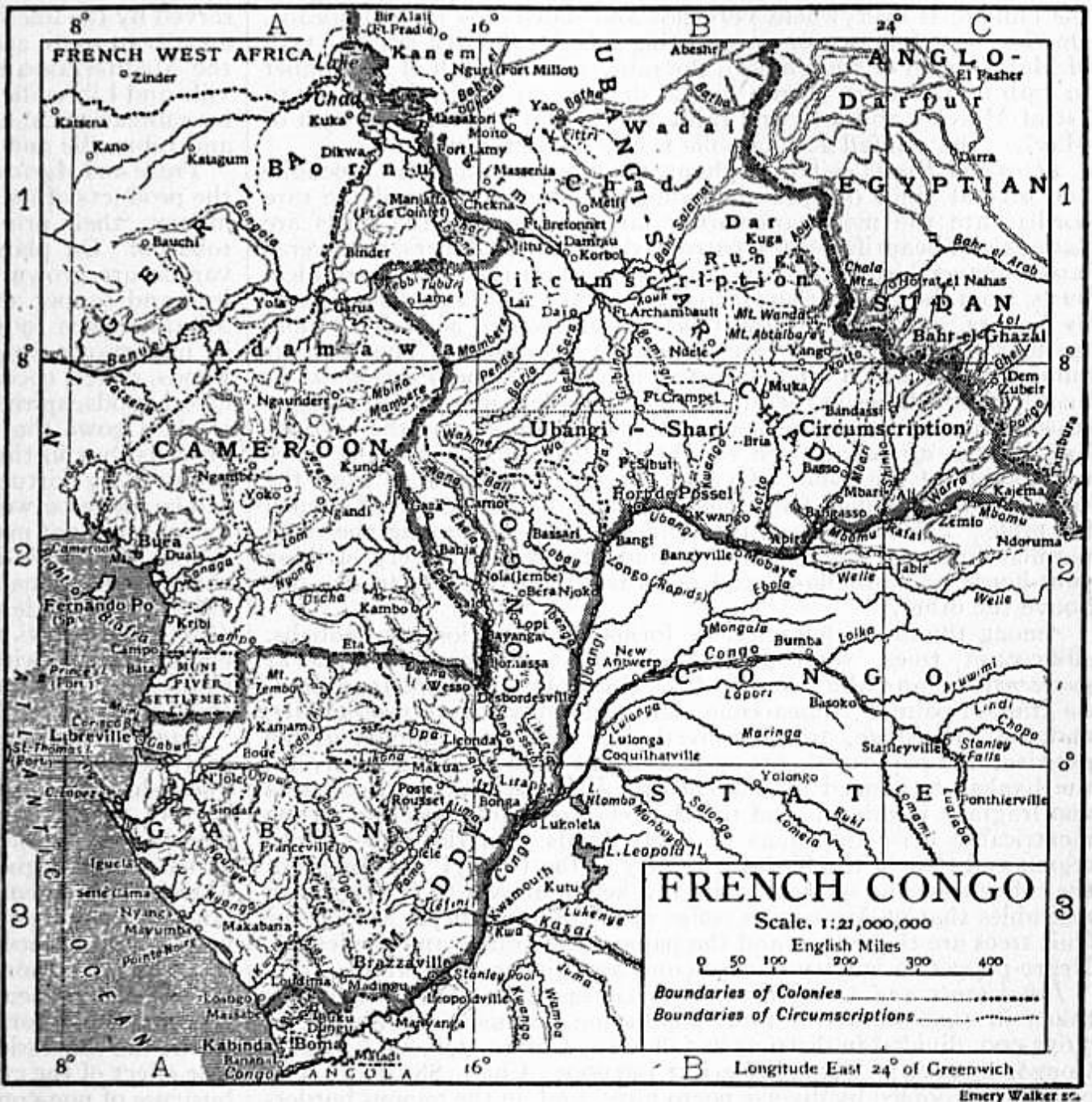
Le Congo français in 1911

- Chief administrators
  - 12 Mar 1889 – 27 April 1895 Fortuné Charles de Chavannes (s.a.)
  - 27 April 1895 – 22 January 1899 Louis Henri Albert Dolisie (b. 1856 – d. 1899)
  - 1 May 1899 – 11 July 1902 Jean-Baptiste Philema Lemaire (b. 1856 – d. 1932)
  - 11 Jul 1902 – 5 April 1906 Émile Gentil (b. 1866 – d. 1914)
  - 5 April 1906 – 12 March 1909 Adolphe Louis Cureau (b. 1864 – d. 1913)
  - 17 Jan 1908 – 17 November 1908 Édouard Marie Bertrand Eugène Dubosc-Taret (acting for Cureau) (b. 1857 – d. 19..)
- Lieutenant governors
  - 12 Mar 1909 – 27 June 1910 Adolphe Louis Cureau (s.a.)
  - 27 Jun 1910 – 28 July 1911 Édouard Dubosc-Taret (acting) (s.a.)
  - 28 Jul 1911 – 16 April 1916 Lucien Louis Fourneau (b. 1867 – d. 1930), acting to 17 October 1912)
  - 16 Apr 1916 – 17 July 1917 Jules Gaston Henri Carde (b. 1874 – d. 1949), (acting to 12 October 1916)
  - 17 Jul 1917 – 2 April 1919 Jules Guy Le Prince (acting) (b. 1868 – d. 19..)
  - 2 Apr 1919 – 16 May 1919 Édmond Émilien Cadier (b. 1868 – d. 1951)
  - 16 May 1919 – 21 August 1919 Jean Henri Marchand (1st time, acting)) (b. 1864 – d. 19..)
  - 21 Aug 1919 – 16 August 1922 Mattéo Mathieu Maurice Alfassa (b. 1876 – d. 1942)
  - 16 Aug 1922 – 20 April 1923 Georges Thomann (acting) (b. 1872 – d. 1943)
  - 24 Apr 1923 – 21 July 1925 Jean Henri Marchand (acting, 2nd time) (s.a.)
  - 21 July 1925 – 1 December 1929 Administration by AEF Governor-general
  - 1 Dec 1929 – 4 December 1930 Marcel Alix Jean Marchessou (acting) (b. 1879 – d. 1964)
  - 4 December 1930 – May 1931 Pierre Simon Antonin Bonnefont (acting) (b. 1877 – d. 1950)
  - May 1931 – 1932 Max de Masson de Saint-Félix (b. 1882 – d. 1958)
  - 1932 – 21 November 1932 Émile Buhot-Launay (acting) (b. 1881 – d. 1970)
  - 21 Nov 1932 – 10 February 1941 Administration by AEF Governor-general
  - 10 Feb 1941 – 20 August 1945 Gabriel Émile Fortune (b. 1897 – d. 1971)
  - 21 Feb 1942 – 19 July 1942 Jean Charles André Capagorry (acting for Fortune) (b. 1894 – d. 1981)
  - 20 Aug 1945 – 30 April 1946 Administration by AEF Governor-general
  - 30 Apr 1946 – 16 May 1946 Christian Robert Roger Laigret (acting) (b. 1903 – d. 1977)
  - 16 May 1946 – 6 November 1946 Administration by AEF Governor-general
  - 6 November 1946 – 31 December 1947 Numa François Henri Sadoul (b. 1906 – d. 1990)
  - 31 Dec 1947 – 1 March 1950 Jacques Georges Fourneau (b. 1901 – d. 1956)
  - 1 Mar 1950 – 25 April 1952 Paul Jules Marie Le Layec (b. 1901 – d. 1965)
  - 25 Apr 1952 – 15 July 1953 Jean Georges Chambon (b. 1896 – d. 1965)
  - 15 Jul 1953 – 2 November 1956 Ernest Eugène Rouys (acting to 19 February 1954) (b. 1901 – d. ....)
  - 2 Nov 1956 – 29 January 1958 Jean-Michel Marie René Soupault (b. 1918 – d. 1993)
  - 29 Jan 1958 – 7 January 1959 Charles Paul Dériaud (acting) (b. 1911 – d. 1964)
- High Commissioner
  - 7 January 1959 – 15 August 1960 Guy Noël Georgy (b. 1918 – d. 2003)

== See also ==
- Belgian Congo
- Raphaël Etifier
- French colonial empire
- French Equatorial Africa
- List of French possessions and colonies
- Ngalifourou
- Syndicat professionnel des commerçants et transporteurs africains du Congo
