= Rinat Akhmetshin =

Russian-American lobbyist, former Soviet counterintelligence officer

- Ринат Рафкатович Ахметшин
- Born: Rinat Rafkatovitch Akhmetshin; 1967 (age 58–59); Kazan, Tatar ASSR, Soviet Union
- Occupation: Lobbyist
- Known for: Attendance at the Trump Tower meeting

Rinat Rafkatovitch Akhmetshin (Russian: Ринат Рафкатович Ахметшин, born 1967) is a Russian-American lobbyist and a former Soviet counterintelligence officer. Bill Browder alleges that Akhmetshin represents Russian intelligence interests. He came to the American media's attention in July 2017 as a registered lobbyist for an organization run by Russian lawyer Natalia Veselnitskaya, who, along with him, had a meeting with Donald Trump's election campaign officials in June 2016.

== Early life ==
Akhmetshin was born in Jan 22, 1968 Kazan, Tatarstan. Akhmetshin served briefly as a counterintelligence officer for the Soviet Union and, according to some U.S. officials, is suspected of "having ongoing ties to Russian Intelligence". According to his statements, from 1986 to 1988 Rinat Akhmetshin served as a draftee in a unit of the Soviet military that had responsibility for law enforcement issues as well as some counterintelligence matters and was briefly in Afghanistan. At a Soviet Army checkpoint in a tunnel in northern Afghanistan, he obtained cash and numerous items from Afghans which he would sell later while he was with a counterintelligence unit. As a teenager in the Soviet armed forces, he was a courier that carried secret documents in briefcases handcuffed to his wrist with two men carrying Kalashnikovs and that he has been to every Soviet military base in Estonia and Latvia. During his time in the Baltics, he sold gasoline from Soviet Army sources. In 1992, he became a first lieutenant in "chemical defence" and trained in the Urals however he claims that he never received training to be an officer. Before 1992, he studied chemistry for one year at Kazan State University.

He stated, "I will never f**k with Russian state," and "I will never do things against Russian government."

== Lobbyist ==
He moved to the United States in 1994 to study biochemistry. As he became a lobbyist for issues relating to the Former Soviet Union, his mentor was Edward Lieberman. In 1998, he set up the Washington D.C. office of the International Eurasian Institute for Economic and Political Research to "help expand democracy and the rule of law in Eurasia". He has been tied to lobbying for political opposition to Kazakhstan's ruling president Nursultan Nazarbayev, efforts to discredit former member of Russia's parliament Ashot Egiazaryan who fled to the U.S., as well as major corporate disputes. While Akhmetshin headed the International Eurasian Institute, Andrey Vavilov hired Akhmetshin to thwart the efforts of Ashot Egiazaryan who was trying to obtain political asylum in the United States.

In 2009, he obtained citizenship of the United States. In 2016 Akhmetshin told Politico: "Just because I was born in Russia doesn't mean I am an agent of [the] Kremlin."

In 2010, he submitted an op-ed to The Washington Times on behalf of Viktor Ivanov the director of Russia's anti-narcotic police.

From 2012 to 2014, EuroChem's United States attorneys retained Akhmetshin as a consultant while the Andrey Melnichenko controlled EuroChem filed lawsuits in Europe against International Mineral Resources (IMR) that was controlled by the Kazakh Trio of Patokh Chodiev, Alexander Machkevitch, and Alijan Ibragimov who had founded the Eurasian Natural Resources Corporation. Mark Cymrot of the United States law firm Baker and Hostetler LLC (BakerHostetler) hired Fusion GPS. Previously, Cymrot had represented Rakhat Aliyev.

In 2013, Akhmetshin recommended attorneys with BakerHostetler to Russian officials associated with Prevezon during ongoing prosecution of Prevezon by the United States. In 2013, both John Moscow and Mark Cymrot of BakerHostetler hired Glenn Simpson and Akhmetshin for support during the Bill Browder, Hermitage Capital and Sergey Magnitsky related case involving Prevezon and Preet Bharara. Previously, John Moscow of BakerHostetler represented Hermitage Capital interests for nine months beginning in September 2008 while Rengaz associated 2006 theft of tax rebates in Russia by a Russian criminal organization. Natalia Veselnitskaya represented Denis Katsyv's interests during the court cases related to Prevezon and also assisted the Glenn Simpson associated Fusion GPS during its research into Bill Browder.

== Hacking incidents and smear campaign ==
According to the New York Times, Akhmetshin was accused of being involved in two hacking campaigns and reportedly had a web of Russian connections.

In 2011, Akhmetshin was hired by Andrey Vavilov to mount a media campaign in order to derail Egiazaryan's application for asylum in the United States. Egiazaryan, a former State Duma member had fled Russia in 2010. According to his own testimony, Akhmetshin was paid "$70,000 or $80,000" in $100 bills. Akhmetshin pushed negative stories on Egiazaryan in the American and Russian press, and also helped manipulate internet search results to further promote the negative stories.

Also in 2011, Akhmetshin was employed by an alliance of businessmen led by Dagestani politician Suleyman Kerimov, a financier close to Putin who was in a commercial and political dispute with competitor Egiazaryan. In early 2011 two of Egiazaryan's lawyers based in London received suspicious emails. The forensics experts they hired for analysis found that the emails contained spyware, and when they fed traceable documents into the spyware the documents were opened by computers registered at the Moscow office park of a company owned by Kerimov. Scotland Yard spent more than 18 months investigating the case but in 2013 concluded that they lacked sufficient evidence to bring charges. In court papers Akhmetshin stated that he was paid only by one businessman in the Kerimov alliance, but coordinated with Kerimov's team.

In a lawsuit filed in July 2015 with the United States District Court for the District of Columbia, it was alleged by International Mineral Resources (IMR) that Akhmetshin had arranged the hacking of a mining company's private records. In court papers filed with the New York Supreme Court in November 2015, lawyers for IMR, a Kazakh mining company that alleged it had been hacked, accused Akhmetshin of hacking into two computer systems and stealing sensitive and confidential materials as part of an alleged black-ops smear campaign against IMR. Akhmetshin, who was hired as an expert by a US law firm, denied hacking or asking anyone else to hack into IMR. He said he gathered research for the firm by bartering information with journalists before he was fired because of his ties to another client, the former prime minister of Kazakhstan, who was then an opposition figure in exile. The hacking accusations were later dropped and the case, which was litigated in New York and Washington, was dismissed.

== Political activities ==
In July 2016, an article in Radio Free Europe stated: "Barely registering in U.S. lobbying records, the 48-year-old Akhmetshin has been tied to efforts to bolster opponents of Kazakhstan's ruling regime, discredit a fugitive former member of Russia's parliament, and undermine a Russian-owned mining firm involved in a billion-dollar lawsuit with company information allegedly stolen by hackers."

=== Lobbying against Magnitsky Act ===
Akhmetshin was linked to Fusion GPS in Washington, D.C., and involved in a pro-Russian campaign in 2016 which involved lobbying congressional staffers to overturn the Magnitsky Act. Both Fusion GPS and Akhmetshin were subject of a complaint by United States Senate Committee on the Judiciary Chairman Chuck Grassley for failure to register as foreign agents under the Foreign Agents Registration Act.

=== 2016 United States elections ===
On 14 July 2017, it was confirmed by multiple sources, including Akhmetshin himself, that he was a fifth and previously undisclosed attendee who met with Donald Trump Jr., Paul Manafort, Jared Kushner, and Russian attorney Natalia Veselnitskaya in the Trump campaign–Russian meeting at Trump Tower on June 9, 2016. Around the time of the meeting, Akhmetshin received half a million dollars in very large payments including $100,000 from Denis Katsyv and another $52,000 from a foundation financially supported by persons wishing to change the Magnitsky Act and Katsyv who also donated $500,000 to the Natalia Veselnitskaya associated Human Rights Accountability Global Initiative.

Asked about Akhmetshin, Kremlin spokesman Dmitry Peskov told reporters: "We don't know anything about this person."

On August 11, 2017, Akhmetshin testified under oath for several hours in a grand jury investigation related to Robert Mueller's investigations into the Trump campaign and Russian interference in the 2016 election.

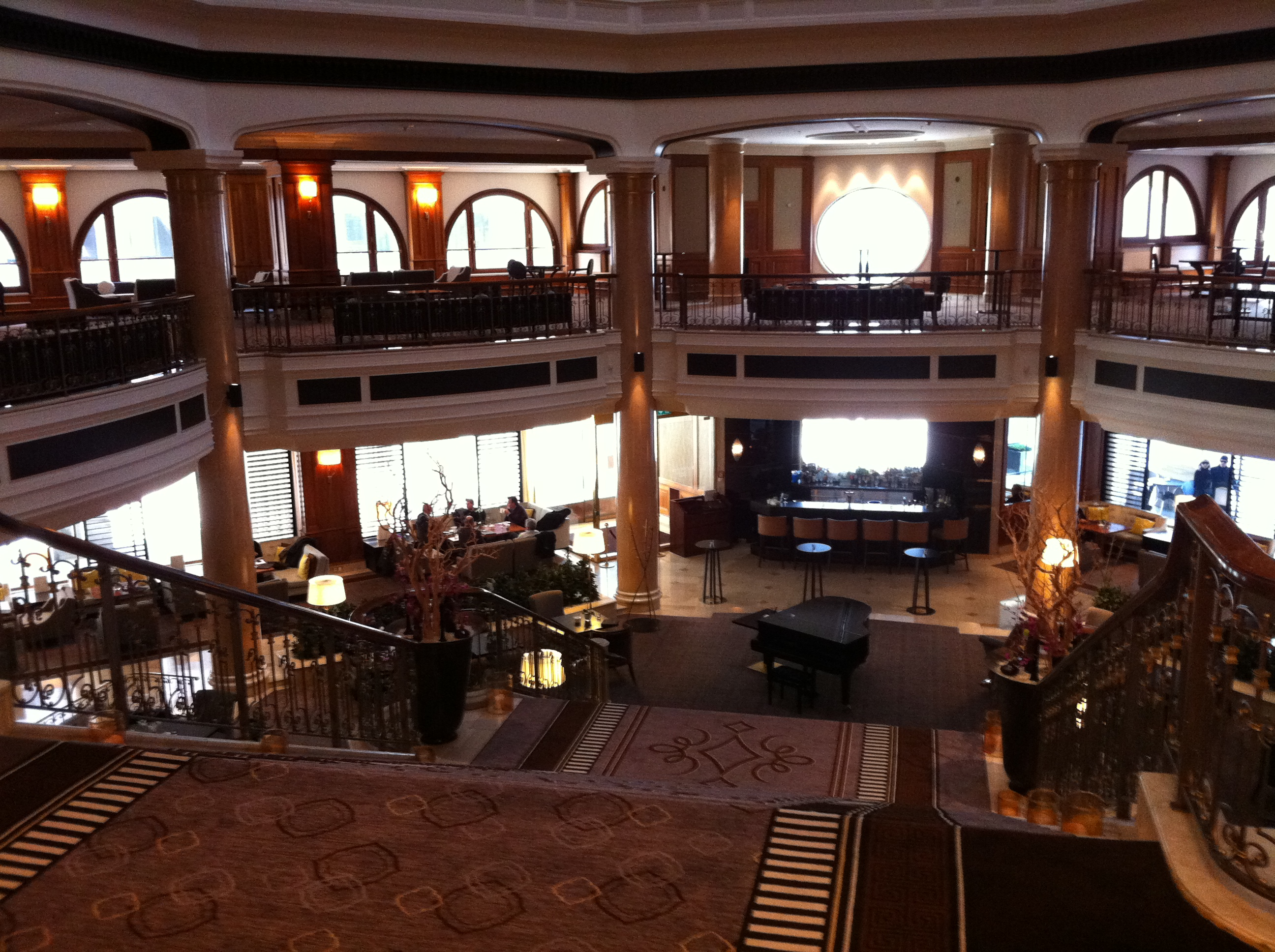
Atrium lobby of The Westin Grand Berlin

=== 2017 Berlin meeting with American congressman ===
On the night of April 11, 2017, Akhmetshin met with US Congressman Dana Rohrabacher in the lobby of The Westin Grand Berlin in Berlin, Germany. There was a discussion about a high-profile money laundering case, along with related sanctions against Russia. The two had met previously in May 2016 in a meeting in Rohrabacher's office.

== Legal issues ==
In 2018 Akhmetshin sued Bill Browder in a federal court in Washington, D.C., accusing Browder of defamation for labeling him a spy or Russian intelligence asset. The case was dismissed in 2019 on jurisdictional grounds. Akhmetshin appealed the dismissal; as of January 2020 the appeal is still pending. On 16 January 2020, Akhmetshin founded a nonprofit in Washington called the Russian-American Anti-Defamation League.

== See also ==
- Lobbying in the United States
- Timeline of investigations into Trump and Russia (2019–2020)
- Timeline of Russian interference in the 2016 United States elections
- Timeline of Russian interference in the 2016 United States elections (July 2016–election day)
