= Trump Tower meeting =

2016 meeting with Donald Trump campaign officials

A meeting took place at Trump Tower in New York City on June 9, 2016, between three senior members of the 2016 Trump campaign – Donald Trump Jr., Jared Kushner, and Paul Manafort – four other U.S. citizens, and Russian lawyer Natalia Veselnitskaya. The meeting was arranged by publicist and long-time Trump acquaintance Rob Goldstone on behalf of his client, Azerbaijani singer-songwriter Emin Agalarov. The meeting was first disclosed to U.S. government officials in April 2017, when Kushner filed a revised version of his security clearance form.

Donald Trump Jr. made several misleading statements about the meeting. He initially told the press that the meeting was held to discuss adoptions of Russian children by Americans. On July 8, 2017, after news reports stated that Trump Jr. knew the meeting was political, he admitted in a tweet that he had agreed to the meeting with the understanding that he would receive information damaging to Hillary Clinton, and that he was conducting opposition research. When The New York Times was about to report on email exchanges between Goldstone and Trump Jr., Trump Jr. himself published the emails. In early July 2017, it was reported that then-President Donald Trump himself drafted Trump Jr.'s initial misleading statement. The report was later confirmed by the president's attorneys. In July 2018, the president denied knowledge of the meeting.

Robert Mueller's special counsel investigation examined the emails and the meeting, and their relation to the Russian interference in the 2016 United States elections. Mueller concluded the campaign did not receive the information it was interested in. He did not charge anyone over the meeting.

== Background ==
Prior to the Trump Tower meeting, Trump campaign advisor George Papadopoulos met at least twice with Joseph Mifsud, who asserted his awareness that Russians had thousands of emails that were damaging to Hillary Clinton. This occurred before the hacking of the DNC computers had become public knowledge. Papadopoulos later shared this information with at least two other people, including an Australian diplomat to Britain. At a meeting on March 24, 2016, the professor brought along a Russian woman, Olga Polonskaya. Papadopoulos made multiple unsuccessful attempts to set up meetings in Russia between Trump or members of his campaign and Russian officials. He communicated his proposals and interactions to several Trump campaign officials. In October 2017 he pleaded guilty to one count of making false statements to the FBI about his actions.

On June 3, 2016, before the public was made aware of potential Russian interference in the presidential election, Donald Trump Jr. was contacted by Rob Goldstone, a British music publicist whose association with the Trumps dates back to the Miss Universe 2013 pageant held in Moscow; at that time, Trump Jr.'s father, businessman Donald Trump, had been co-owner of the pageant. Goldstone's client, Emin Agalarov, an Azerbaijani singer, performed at the Miss Universe event. His father, Aras Agalarov, is a wealthy real estate developer in Moscow.

In his June 3 email to Trump Jr., Goldstone wrote:

Emin just called and asked me to contact you with something very interesting.

The Crown prosecutor of Russia (Note: "Crown prosecutor" is not the title of any office that exists in Russia; Goldstone is likely referring to the Prosecutor General of Russia here. The position has been held by Yury Chaika since 2006.) met with his father Aras this morning and in their meeting offered to provide the Trump campaign with some official documents and information that would incriminate Hillary and her dealings with Russia and would be very useful to your father.

This is obviously very high level and sensitive information but is part of Russia and its government's support for Mr. Trump – helped along by Aras and Emin.

Trump Jr. responded:

Thanks Rob I appreciate that. I am on the road at the moment but perhaps I just speak to Emin first. Seems we have some time and if it's what you say I love it especially later in the summer. Could we do a call first thing next week when I am back?

On 7 June 2016, on behalf of Emin Agalarov, Goldstone e-mailed Donald Trump's son Donald Trump Jr., to request a meeting between the younger Trump and Russian lawyer Natalia Veselnitskaya (referred to in Goldstone's e-mail as a "Russian government attorney"). According to Goldstone's email, Agalarov wanted to "provide the Trump campaign with some official documents and information" that would help Donald Trump's campaign and damage the campaign of his rival, Hillary Clinton.

== Meeting ==
The arranged meeting took place at Trump Tower in the afternoon of June 9, 2016. At least eight people attended. The gathering included the younger Trump; Donald Trump's son-in-law, Jared Kushner; Trump's campaign manager, Paul Manafort; Aras Agaralov's employee Ike Kaveladze; Russian lawyer Natalia Veselnitskaya; former Russian counterintelligence officer Rinat Akhmetshin; and a translator.

When the meeting first became known, conflicting accounts of who attended circulated. With time, more names came forward. At first, Donald Trump Jr. did not disclose that Ike Kaveladze, Rob Goldstone, and Anatoli Samachornov attended the meeting.

At the meeting, Goldstone introduced this person as Moscow-based attorney Natalia Veselnitskaya. She stated that she was not a government official; however, she is known to have ties to the Russian government and later described herself as an "informant" to the office of the Russian prosecutor general. According to Goldstone, she had planned to be in New York for a court appearance on June 9. Trump Jr. offered an in-person meeting that afternoon, which Goldstone confirmed. Trump Jr. forwarded the email thread to Jared Kushner and Paul Manafort.

=== Participants ===
==== Trump campaign officials ====
News report from Voice of America

- Jared Kushner, Trump's son-in-law, responsible for the campaign's digital, online, and social media operations.
- Paul Manafort, campaign manager for the presidential campaign of Donald Trump from March 29, 2016, to August 19, 2016. He was formerly a lobbyist.
- Donald Trump Jr., eldest son of Donald Trump, active in the presidential campaign as a key political aide and advisor to his father.

==== Russian lobbyists ====
- Natalia Veselnitskaya, a Russian lawyer best known in the United States for lobbying against the Magnitsky Act. According to The New York Times, in Moscow she is regarded as a "trusted insider" who has argued cases for government agencies and high-profile clients including Pyotr Katsyv, an official in the state-owned Russian Railways, and his son Denis, whom she defended against a money laundering charge in New York. She has also been an informant in active communication with Yury Chaika, the Russian prosecutor general, since 2013. Starting in 2014, she had worked with Fusion GPS, the firm that was later hired to do opposition research on Trump, to investigate an unrelated money-laundering case involving Prevezon Holding, and the "dirt" she brought with her to the meeting stemmed from that work. The work on the Prevezon case, and later on the dossier, were completely separate, and Fusion GPS co-founder Glenn Simpson testified before the Senate Judiciary Committee that they were unaware that Veselnitskaya would meet with Trump campaign members or share anything from the Prevezon case with them.
- Rinat Akhmetshin, a Russian-American lobbyist and former Soviet counterintelligence officer suspected of "having ongoing ties to Russian Intelligence", although he denies it. After the dissolution of the Soviet Union, he immigrated to the United States in 1993 and became a U.S. citizen in 2009. According to The New York Times, Akhmetshin has "a history of working for close allies of President Vladimir V. Putin."

==== Other participants ====
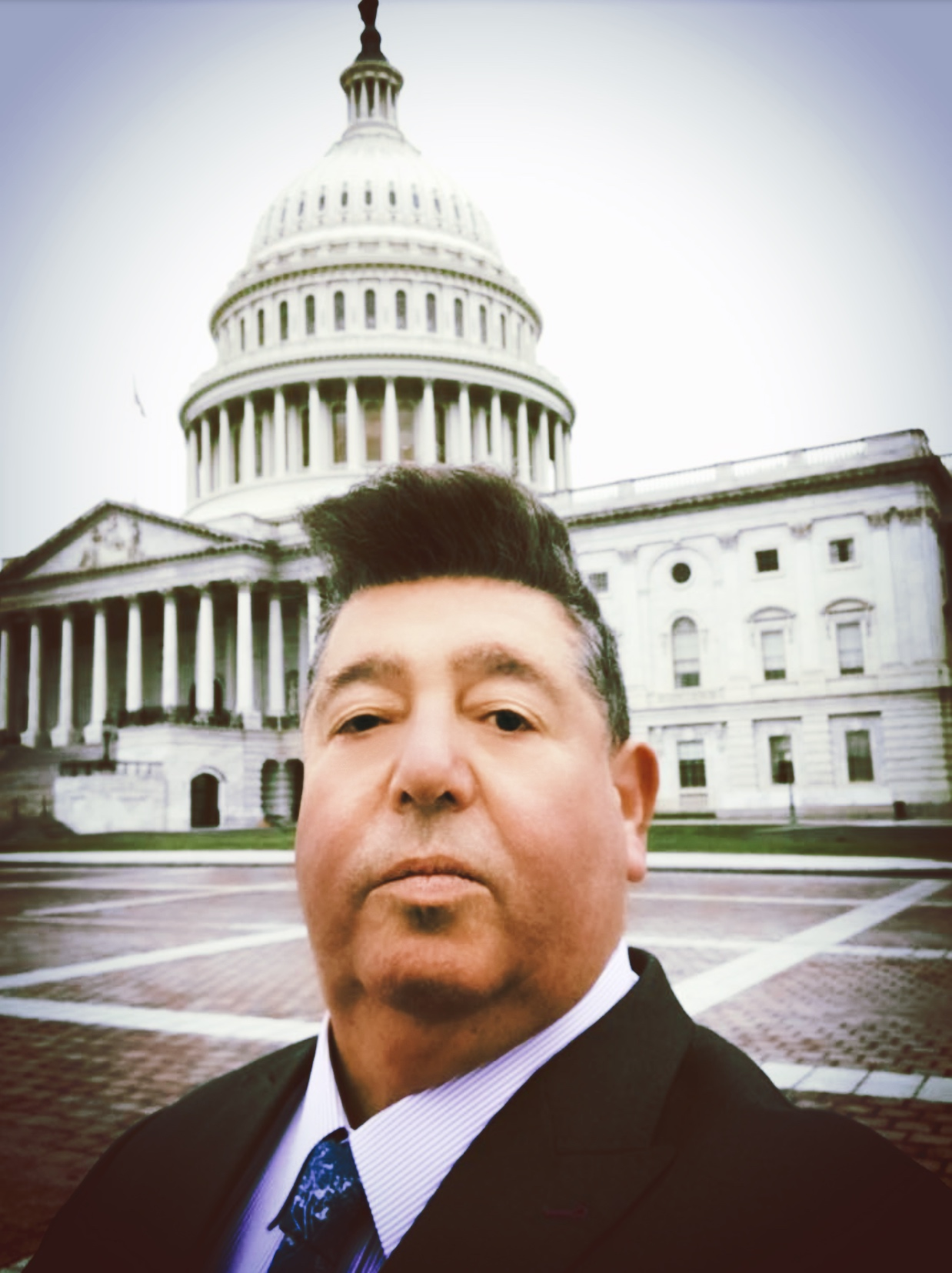
Goldstone in 2017

- Rob Goldstone (b. 3 December 1960), the publicist of Emin Agalarov, who said that Agalarov asked him to contact Trump Jr. New York attorney Scott S. Balber, who was retained by Emin and Aras Agalarov, denied that Goldstone's emails accurately outlined the origins of the meeting. Goldstone was born in Whitefield, Bury, Greater Manchester, where his father was a founding member of the Hillock Hebrew Congregation. He attended Delamere Forest School in Cheshire and Heys Boys' County Secondary School in Prestwich. He left school at age 16 to become a trainee sports reporter at the Jewish Gazette. He then worked for the Radcliffe Times and, later, for the Birmingham Evening Mail then in the newsroom at Birmingham's BRMB Radio. In 1987, Goldstone founded Oui 2 Entertainment, a publicity, marketing, and event-planning company. Clients of the company have included the New York Friars Club, the Madison Square Boys and Girls Club, Steinway & Sons, the Russian Tea Room, and Azerbaijani pop star Emin Agalarov. Oui 2 assisted the Trump Organization in bringing the 2013 Miss Universe Pageant to Moscow with Agaralov's father, billionaire Aras Agalarov, as host. He later authored Pop Stars, Pageants & Presidents: How an Email Trumped My Life (Oui2 Entertainment, 2018).
- Anatoli Samochornov, a translator for Veselnitskaya. In the past, Samochornov worked for Meridian International and did contract work for the U.S. State Department as an interpreter. Samochornov is a citizen of the United States.
- Ike Kaveladze, a Georgian-American, US-based senior vice president at Crocus Group, the real estate development company run by Aras Agalarov. Kaveladze's lawyer Scott Balber, who also represents Aras and Emin Agalarov, stated that Kaveladze attended the meeting as the Agalarov family's emissary "just to make sure it happened and to serve as an interpreter if necessary."

=== Purpose ===
Trump Jr. initially told reporters that the meeting had been "primarily about adoptions". He then released a statement saying it had been a "short introductory meeting" concerning "a program about the adoption of Russian children". A few days later Trump Jr. acknowledged that he went into the meeting expecting to receive opposition research from Veselnitskaya that could hurt Clinton's campaign, adding that none was presented and that the conversation instead focused on the Magnitsky Act. Later a statement from Trump Jr.'s lawyer said Veselnitskaya had claimed to have information "that individuals connected to Russia were funding the Democratic National Committee and supporting Mrs. Clinton" but "it quickly became clear that she had no meaningful information". Trump Jr. said he felt the adoption issue was her "true agenda all along" and the claims of helpful political information were a pretext. After learning that The New York Times was about to publish the series of emails setting up the meeting, Trump Jr. himself published the email chain via Twitter, and explained that he considered the meeting to be "political opposition research". He summarized the meeting as "such a nothing... a wasted 20 minutes".

Both Donald Trump and Trump Jr. have claimed this was "opposition research", but Steven D'Amico, an expert on the subject, denies the claim and describes proper opposition research: "All information gathered must be lawfully obtained....and you certainly don't sit in on meetings where a foreign attorney promises sensitive information obtained by a rival government."

Veselnitskaya said that she intended to provide allegations to the Trump campaign about a firm connected to William Browder, a financier who lobbied for the Magnitsky Act. She said that the firm committed tax evasion in Russia and donated to Democrats. She said in an interview, "I never had any damaging or sensitive information about Hillary Clinton. It was never my intention to have that." She initially denied the allegation that she was or is connected to the Russian government. At a later date she disclosed that she was in regular contact with the Russian Prosecutor General's office and with Prosecutor General Yury Chaika, about sharing information she acquired in her investigation relating to the Magnitsky Act.

On July 14, Akhmetshin stated in an interview that Veselnitskaya had claimed to have evidence of "violations of Russian law by a Democratic donor", and added that she "described her findings at the meeting and left a document about them with Trump Jr. and the others."

=== Disclosure timeline ===
The meeting first came to the attention of authorities in April 2017, when Kushner reported on a revised security clearance form that he had met with Veselnitskaya.

The existence of the meeting was reported in July 2017. Some news outlets took the meeting as evidence of collusion between the Trump campaign and the Russian government. On July 8, 2017, The New York Times first mentioned a June 2016 meeting with "a Russian lawyer who has connections to the Kremlin", arranged by Trump Jr. and including Kushner and Manafort. Later that day, Trump Jr. released a statement calling it a "short introductory meeting" about American adoption of Russian children and "not a campaign issue". The next day it emerged that Goldstone had told Trump Jr. that the meeting would provide the Trump campaign with negative information about Clinton, and that this offer was "part of Russia and its government's support for Mr. Trump", without mentioning adoptions or the Magnitsky Act. Trump Jr. reacted by acknowledging that he had been expecting information about Clinton. Over the next few days the identity of the attendees was established.

On July 11 Trump Jr. tweeted the entire email chain leading up to the meeting, a few minutes before The New York Times published it as well. Trump Jr. stated that he would have preferred to just have a phone call but that didn't work out. He told Sean Hannity that the meeting had been fully arranged by email, and that he had received no further details by phone. He would later contradict this statement during a closed-door interview with the Senate Judiciary Committee on September 7, acknowledging three short phone calls with Agalarov prior to the meeting.

On July 12, 2017, President Trump stated in a Reuters interview that he had only known about the meeting for a couple of days, and that "many people would have held that meeting". Trump praised his son Don Jr. for his transparency in releasing the emails, and claimed that they were victims of a "political witch hunt". The same day Trump Jr. denied having told his father about the meeting. On July 13, Corey Lewandowski was asked on NBC's Meet the Press why he had not been invited to the meeting. He replied that he was at a Trump rally in Florida on the meeting date, but there was in fact no rally in Florida that day. Instead, Trump attended a Trump Victory fundraising lunch at the Four Seasons Hotel in New York, and returned to Trump Tower at 1:02 PM, where he "remained for the rest of the afternoon". According to emails, the Veselnitskaya meeting was scheduled for 4:00 PM.

The July 8 statement by Trump Jr. became controversial in its own right because of conflicting stories about who had written it. On July 11 it was reported that the statement had been drafted by presidential advisers aboard Air Force One on the way home from the G20 summit in Germany, and that it had been approved by President Trump. On July 12 Trump's lawyer Jay Sekulow insisted that it had been written by Trump Jr. in consultation with his lawyer, and that Donald Trump "wasn't involved in that". He repeated these statements on July 16. On July 31 The Washington Post reported that Trump had indeed personally dictated, worked on, and released the statement in Trump Jr's name, with claims that "were later shown to be misleading". According to The Post, Trump had "overruled the consensus" of Trump Jr., Kushner, aides, and lawyers, who favored issuing a transparent account "because they believed the complete story would eventually emerge." Some advisors reportedly feared "that the president's direct involvement leaves him needlessly vulnerable to allegations of a coverup." The next day, White House Press Secretary Sarah Huckabee Sanders stated that Trump "certainly didn't dictate, but ... he weighed in, offered suggestions, like any father would do". In January 2018, in a confidential letter from Trump's legal team to special counsel Robert Mueller, Trump's lawyers acknowledged for the first time that Trump had in fact dictated the first statement put out about the meeting in Trump Jr.'s name, thus contradicting prior representations.

Although Goldstone's emails described Veselnitskaya as a "Russian government attorney", Scott Balber, formerly a lawyer for Trump and now for Agalarov, said in a July 14, 2017, interview that she had no association with the Russian government. For his part, Akhmetshin denied having ties to Russian intelligence, and said that the efforts by Veselnitskaya and himself "were not coordinated with the Russian government." Kremlin spokesman Dmitry Peskov said the government didn't know Akhmetshin or Veselnitskaya, or anything about the meeting. In a November 2017 statement to the Senate Judiciary Committee, Veselnitskaya said "I have no relationship with Mr. Chaika, his representatives and his institutions other than those related to my professional functions as a lawyer." However she also stated in April 2018: "I am a lawyer, and I am an informant," adding that "since 2013, I have been actively communicating with the office of the Russian prosecutor general," Yury Chaika.

CNN reported on October 9 that Balber had obtained the memo which Veselnitskaya took to the meeting, and it was released by Foreign Policy. Veselnitskaya was Balber's only source for the document, as well as the only source of the claim that this is the same document that was brought to the Trump Tower meeting; this matters because Veselnitskaya has elsewhere been indicted on charges of falsifying the origin of another document which she helped draft and release to US investigators in a separate investigation which is also related to William Browder and the Magnitsky Act. The memo released by Veselnitskaya claimed that an American firm, Ziff Brothers Investments, illegally evaded tens of millions of dollars in Russian taxes, and contributed to Clinton's election campaign. Veselnitskaya reportedly coordinated this accusation in advance with Chaika, and Putin later repeated the charge.

Two previously undisclosed emails from Rob Goldstone emerged on December 7, as discovered by congressional investigators. The recipients included Trump Jr., Kushner, and Manafort. In a June 14, 2016, email, five days after the meeting, Goldstone forwarded a news story about Russian hacking of Democrats' emails, describing the news as "eerily weird" in light of what had been discussed at Trump Tower. This discovery contradicted the initial statement by Trump Jr. that "there was no follow up" after the meeting, as well as his September 2017 testimony to the Senate Judiciary Committee in which he stated: "Rob, Emin and I never discussed the meeting again".

On 18 December 2017, Goldstone was interviewed by the United States House Permanent Select Committee on Intelligence.

On May 16, 2018, the Senate Judiciary Committee released emails and text messages in which Trump attorney Alan S. Futerfas provided a prepared statement for Goldstone, Agalarov and Kaveladze, further asserting that it "would be our preference" if they did not say anything else in response to inquiries about the meeting.

In May 2018, transcripts released by Senate Judiciary Committee revealed that Russian lawyer Natalia Veselnitskaya had met with Glenn Simpson who was the co-founder of Fusion GPS, both the day before and the day after she met with Donald Trump Jr. The two had worked together on an unrelated litigation matter from 2014 through mid- to late-2016.

=== Reactions ===
==== Congressional reactions ====
Democratic Representatives Brad Sherman and Al Green sponsored a resolution to impeach President Trump. Sherman argued that Trump Jr.'s emails "add credibility" to the theory that Trump dismissed James Comey as Director of the Federal Bureau of Investigation as an attempt to derail the ongoing investigation.

On July 10, 2017, the Vice Chairman of the Senate Intelligence Committee, Democratic Senator Mark Warner, stated that "This is the first time that the public has seen clear evidence of senior level members of the Trump campaign meeting Russians to try to obtain information that might hurt the campaign of Hillary Clinton". Warner also stated that the incident was part of a "continuing pattern" in which Trump officials and members of the Trump campaign have "conveniently forgotten meetings with Russians only when they are then presented with evidence, they have to recant and acknowledge those kind of meetings". Another member of the committee, the Republican Susan Collins, stated that Donald Trump Jr. and others who attended the meeting should testify before the committee. Representative Adam Schiff, the top Democrat on the House Intelligence Committee, described the matter as "a very serious development", and that "It all warrants thorough investigation. Everyone who was in that meeting ought to come before our committee."

Republicans in Congress have been for the most part muted with their comments about the event. On July 10, 2017, Representative Ted Yoho (R-FL) when asked in an interview if he thought it was appropriate for Trump Jr. to take a meeting with a Russian national, responded that he "probably would have done the same thing" calling it "opposition research". On July 11, 2017, Representative Marsha Blackburn (R-TN) suggested that "the president's son may have been 'duped' into attending the meeting".

==== Other reactions ====
The meeting was regarded by some commentators as evidence of attempted collusion between the Trump campaign and Russia.

A statement issued by Mark Corallo, former spokesperson for Trump's legal team, suggested that the meeting was a "setup" and that Veselnitskaya and her translator had "misrepresented who they were".

== Investigations ==
=== Congressional investigation ===
The Senate Intelligence Committee held a private hearing with Kushner on July 24. In the meeting he responded to questions by the Committee about his contacts with Russian officials and insisted that he had not colluded with foreign agents. He publicly released an 11-page written statement detailing four meetings he had with Russian officials during the campaign and transition periods, including the Trump Tower meeting. He said he had not known all the details about that meeting because he did not read all of the email chain that Trump Jr. had forwarded to him. The Intelligence Committee also met privately with Manafort on July 25.

The Committee on the Judiciary scheduled a hearing on July 26 on the subject "Oversight of the Foreign Agents Registration Act and Attempts to Influence U.S. Elections: Lessons Learned from Current and Prior Administrations". Trump Jr. and Manafort were originally scheduled to testify at that hearing, but each negotiated to meet privately with the committee on July 25 instead. They have also arranged to turn over requested documents to the committee. Among the documents Manafort turned over to congressional investigators were notes he took during the June 2016 meeting. Manafort and Trump Jr. are expected to testify in public eventually. William Browder testified before the Committee on the Judiciary on July 27, claiming that Veselnitskaya was representing the Kremlin's interests in the meeting, which was arranged for persuading the future lifting of the Magnitsky Act.

On September 7, 2017, Donald Trump Jr. testified privately under questioning from Senate Judiciary Committee staffers. The New York Times reported that in his testimony, Trump Jr. acknowledged he had indeed sought the meeting in the hopes to obtain information about Clinton's "fitness".

In July 2018, CNN reported, citing anonymous sources, that Michael Cohen had asserted without evidence that the president was aware of the Tower meeting in advance. President Trump denied knowing about the meeting, saying "I did NOT know of the meeting with my son, Don jr. Sounds to me like someone is trying to make up stories in order to get himself out of an unrelated jam". In his opening statement to the House Oversight Committee on February 27, 2019 Cohen said:

Sometime in the summer of 2017, I read all over the media that there had been a meeting in Trump Tower in June 2016 involving Don Jr. and others from the campaign with Russians, including a representative of the Russian government, and an email setting up the meeting with the subject line, "Dirt on Hillary Clinton." ... I also knew that nothing went on in Trump world, especially the campaign, without Mr. Trump's knowledge and approval. So, I concluded that Don Jr. was referring to that June 2016 Trump Tower meeting about dirt on Hillary with the Russian representative when he walked behind his dad's desk that day – and that Mr. Trump knew that was the meeting Don Jr. was talking about when he said, "That's good... let me know."

=== Special counsel investigation ===
As of July 2017, Robert Mueller, the special counsel of the Department of Justice in charge of Russia-related investigations, was looking into the Trump Tower meeting. The inquiry was confirmed by Kaveladze's attorney, who said special counsel investigators are seeking information from his client. On July 21, 2017, Mueller asked the White House to preserve all documents related to the Russian meeting in June 2016. By August 3, 2017, Mueller had impaneled a grand jury in the District of Columbia that issued subpoenas concerning the meeting. In April 2018, Mueller filed documents with the court that stated that the intended purpose of the raid on Manafort's home in July 2017 was to seek documents related to the Trump Tower meeting.

The Mueller investigation concluded that the Trump campaign did not criminally conspire with Russia, and Mueller did not charge anyone over the meeting. Mueller investigated the messages Kushner sent his assistants trying to get himself out of the meeting, and concluded the campaign did not receive the information it was interested. According to the Mueller report, the investigation did not find evidence that Trump Jr. had told his father about meeting. The report said, "Although damaging opposition research is surely valuable to a campaign, it appears that the information ultimately delivered in the meeting was not valuable."

== See also ==
- Timeline of Russian interference in the 2016 United States elections
- Timeline of Russian interference in the 2016 United States elections (July 2016–election day)
- Democratic National Committee v. Russian Federation which names attendees of the meeting as defendants
