= Human Rights Accountability Global Initiative =

The Human Rights Accountability Global Initiative Foundation (HRAGI or HRAGIF) is a Washington, D.C.–based lobby group, nominally focused on restoring American adoption of Russian children. It is being investigated as part of the 2017 Special Counsel investigation. It is reportedly defunct.

== History ==
The organization was registered in Wilmington, Delaware on February 16, 2016, with two nominal employees. The organization rented the Newseum to screen Andrei Nekrasov's The Magnitsky Act – Behind the Scenes, a film aimed at discrediting Sergei Magnitsky.

== Purpose ==
The nominal purpose of the HRAGI is “to help restart American adoption of Russian children”, though news organizations have reported that its primary purpose was to serve as a vehicle to lobby against international sanctions on Russia.

== Financing ==
The foundation has received over $500,000 in financing, mostly from Russian politician Petr Katsyv who is the father of Denis Katsyv. Other major donors include Russian businessmen Mikhail Ponomarev and Albert Nasibulin, and $100,000 from a German company called Berryle Trading Inc.

== Staff ==
The organization was founded by Natalia Veselnitskaya. The HRAGI hired lobbyists, including former Representative Ron Dellums, to lobby against the Magnitsky Act. Dellums denied involvement with the group.

Anatoly Samochornov (Russian: Анатолий Самочорнов), who is a Russian-born professional interpreter, is another lobbyist and is a projectmanager for the US State Department.

Robert Arakelian was the listed as the President, treasurer, secretary, and director of the Foundation. Though Arakelian is listed as the incorporator of the foundation, he told the FBI that Ed Lieberman and BakerHostetler actually oversaw the incorporation on February 18, 2016.
