= Natalia Veselnitskaya =

Russian lawyer (born 1975)

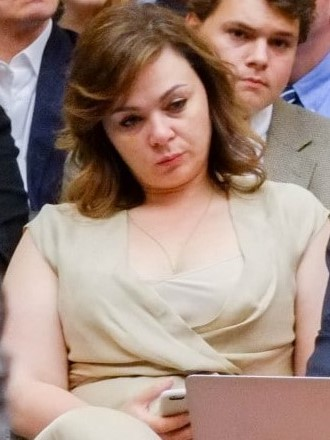
- Veselnitskaya attends a House Foreign Affairs Committee hearing on Russia in 2016.
- Born: Natalia Vladimirovna Veselnitskaya; 22 February 1975 (age 51); Kramatorsk, Donetsk Oblast, Ukrainian SSR (nowadays Ukraine)
- Education: Moscow State Legal Academy
- Occupation: Lawyer
- Known for: Advocacy against Magnitsky Act; Trump Tower meeting
- Spouse: Aleksandr Mitusov (divorced)
- Website: veselnitskaya.info

Natalia Vladimirovna Veselnitskaya (Russian: Ната́лья Влади́мировна Весельни́цкая, IPA: [nɐˈtalʲjə vʲɪsʲɪlʲˈnʲitskəjə]; born 22 February 1975 Kramatorsk, Donetsk Oblast, Ukrainian SSR, Soviet Union) is a Russian lawyer. Her clients include Pyotr Katsyv, an official in the state-owned Russian Railways, and his son Denis Katsyv, whom she defended against a money laundering charge in New York. On 8 January 2019, Veselnitskaya was indicted in the United States with obstruction of justice charges for allegedly having attempted to thwart the Justice Department investigation into the money laundering charges against Katsyv.

Her June 2016 meeting with Donald Trump Jr., Jared Kushner, and Paul Manafort in Trump Tower attracted attention in connection with the Russian interference in the 2016 United States elections, as well as to the role of her business contacts at the research firm Fusion GPS in investigating the interference.

== Education and career ==
Veselnitskaya has said that she graduated with distinction from the Moscow State Legal Academy in 1998. She attests that she was then employed for a period by the prosecutor's office in Moscow Oblast, where she worked on legislation, and claims to have won over 300 legal cases. Veselnitskaya switched to private practice, focusing on land deals in the expanding Moscow suburbs.

Veselnitskaya is a long-time lawyer for Pyotr Katsyv, who is the vice president of the state-owned Russian Railways, and was formerly the Moscow region's minister of transportation. In 2008, the Russian journalist Vladimir Solovyov accused Veselnitskaya and her stepdaughter of orchestrating unusual court decisions regarding land in Moscow. Veselnitskaya successfully sued Spravedlivost, an anti-corruption nonprofit, for defamation after it accused her, her former husband, and Katsyv of seizing land using government connections. Her claims that land owned by IKEA was actually owned by an old collective farm were ultimately dismissed by the Supreme Court of Russia. Veselnitskaya's law firm Kamerton Consulting represented a Russian military unit's interests in a property dispute case from 2005 to 2013.

In an interview with NBC News in April 2017, Veselnitskaya said that she was both a lawyer and an informant who provided Yury Chaika, the Russian prosecutor general, with information since 2013.

== Advocacy against the Magnitsky Act ==
In 2009, Sergei Magnitsky, a tax accountant who had accused Moscow law enforcement of stealing $230 million in tax rebates from his client, was beaten to death in jail. In 2012, Magnitsky's client, Bill Browder, secured passage of the American Magnitsky Act, which imposed sanctions on the officials involved. Russian President Vladimir Putin responded with the Dima Yakovlev Law banning Americans from adopting Russian children.

In February 2015, the Human Rights Accountability Global Initiative was created in Delaware. Rinat Akhmetshin, a naturalized U.S. citizen from Russia, who has worked as a Washington lobbyist since 1998, agreed to lobby for the foundation backed by Denis Katsyv. From 1986 to 1988, Akhmetshin served in the Soviet Army, where he obtained the rank of sergeant and worked in a counterintelligence unit for the KGB. Veselnitskaya's campaign included an unsuccessful attempt in Washington to repeal the Magnitsky Act and to "keep Mr. Magnitsky's name off the law".

On 9 June 2016, Veselnitskaya met with Donald Trump Jr., Paul Manafort, and Jared Kushner in Trump Tower, which they scheduled after Emin Agalarov's publicist, Rob Goldstone, told Donald Jr. that she was a "Russian government attorney" offering incriminating information on Hillary Clinton due to "its government’s support for Mr. Trump". Regarding the meeting, Trump Jr. initially wrote, "I love it" but, in July 2017, said the meeting "was a waste of time". Donald Trump Jr. said that Veselnitskaya used the meeting to criticize the Magnitsky Act. Veselnitskaya herself commented that she mostly talked about Browder's (alleged) misdeeds, whereas the Trump team wanted what she termed "some sort of grenade".

Akhmetshin said he met with Veselnitskaya for lunch and she asked him to attend the meeting, which he then did. According to Akhmetshin, Veselnitskaya's translator, Anatoli Samachornov, also attended. He said Veselnitskaya left a document with Trump Jr.

Also on or around 9 June, prior to and following the Trump Tower meeting, Veselnitskaya met with Fusion GPS co-founder Glenn R. Simpson, ostensibly related to hearings that involved their mutual client Denis Katsyv, concerning charges of Russian tax fraud and money laundering originally uncovered by Magnitsky. The Simpson–Veselnitskaya meetings were denied by Veselnitskaya herself but confirmed by Simpson's lawyer. This has led to speculation from Trump allies linking the meetings to Fusion GPS's concurrent work assembling the Steele Dossier against then-candidate Trump.

Two days after the Trump Tower meeting, the Human Rights Accountability Global Initiative Foundation (who Akhmetshin worked for, as a lobbyist) registered to lobby Congress on the Magnitsky Act.

Later that June, Veselnitskaya screened a film by Andrei Nekrasov at the Newseum in Washington, D.C., that was critical of Magnitsky. She was "deeply involved in the making of The Magnitsky Act – Behind the Scenes". She provided the film crew with "the real proofs and records of testimony" according to RussiaTV5, a "station whose owners are known to be close to Mr. Putin". In April 2016, the European Parliament refused to show this film about Magnitsky on the basis that it was "pro-Russian propaganda".

Veselnitskaya represented Pyotr Katsyv's son, Denis, when Preet Bharara, the United States Attorney for the Southern District of New York, charged him with money laundering. Federal prosecutors accused Katsyv of using Manhattan real estate deals to launder money stolen from Browder's Hermitage Capital Management. The Russian government then banned Bharara from traveling there.

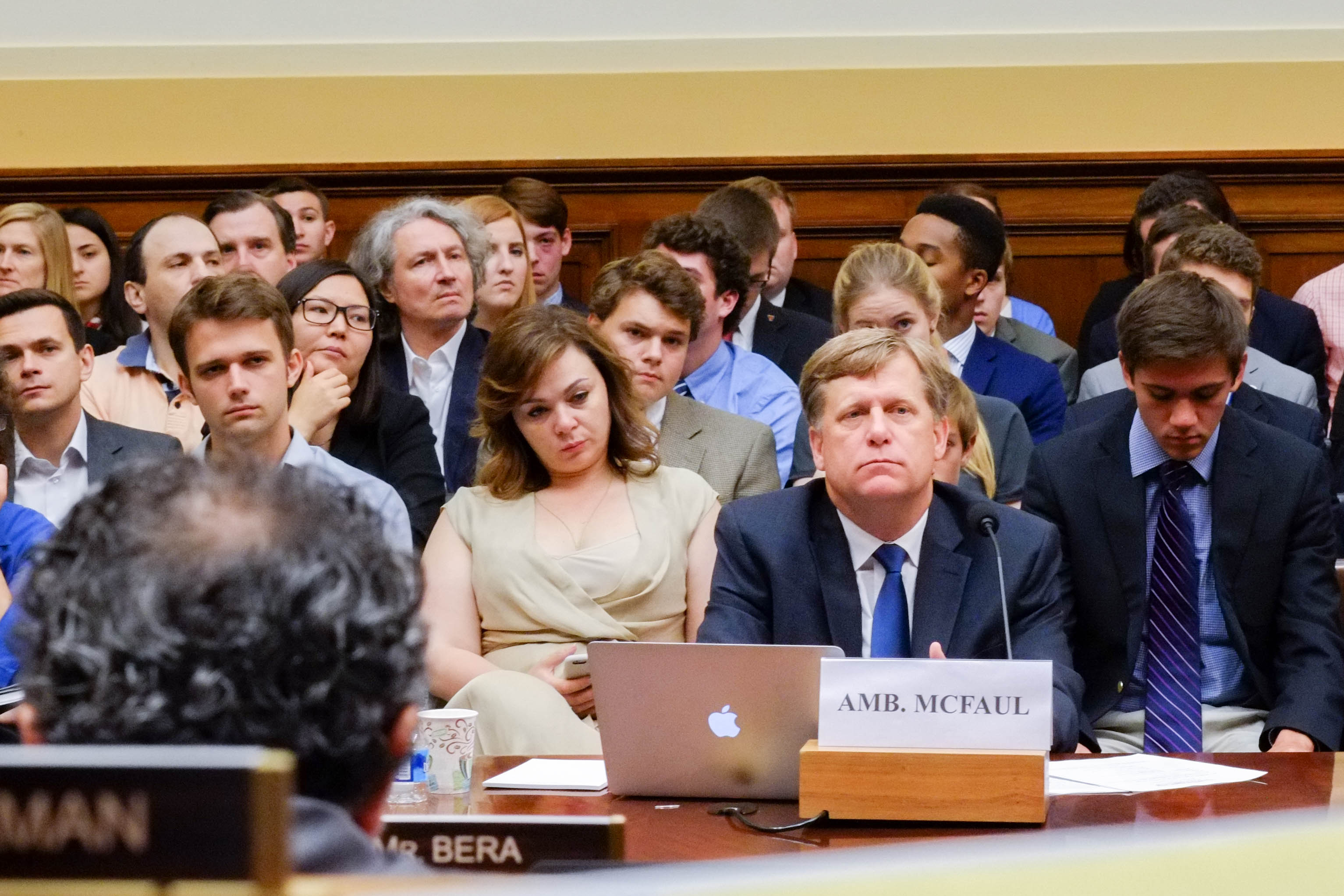
A House Foreign Affairs Committee hearing on "U.S. Policy Toward Putin's Russia" on 14 June 2016. Former U.S. ambassador to Russia Michael McFaul testified as Veselnitskaya sat behind him.

In October 2015, Veselnitskaya traveled to Manhattan with her clients for a deposition in the money laundering case. After being told, at the end of the deposition, that the counterparty would be required to reimburse her for her expenses, she billed the U.S. government $50,000, for an $800 meal, eight grappas, and a $995-per-night room at the Plaza Hotel.

According to Swiss news sources, a Swiss agent and Russia specialist from the Federal Office of Police, investigating the Prevezon transaction from a Magnitsky Act violation, travelled privately to Moscow in December 2016 with his diplomatic passport, where he met Veselnitskaya. The meeting was apparently set up by Russian Deputy Attorney General Saak Albertovich Karapetyan. Because the officer, known only as Victor K., visited Russia without the knowledge of his Swiss superiors, and part of his stay in a Moscow luxury hotel was financed by Russian officials, the man was later dismissed, suspected of abuse of office, violation of official secrecy and corruption. During an unauthorized flight, Karapetyan died in a helicopter crash north-east of Moscow in March 2019.

President Donald Trump fired Bharara on 11 March 2017 and Jeff Sessions replaced him with Joon Kim as the acting US Attorney for the southern district of New York during the rest of the case. In May 2017, the international money laundering case was settled with Katsyv's company, Prevezon Holdings, which was represented by Louis Freeh, paying $6 million (without any admission of wrongdoing). The settlement was for less than 3% of the amount prosecutors had initially sought. (Note: Prevezon's attorney Louis Freeh was Director of the FBI from September 1, 1993, until June 25, 2001. In May 2018, Freeh purchased a $9.38 million home from Armen A. Manoogian in Palm Beach, Florida, near Mar-a-Lago where Freeh often attended events.) In November 2017, Katsyv's company Prevezon stated that it would pay the fine using money from AFI Europe which is a subsidiary of Lev Leviev's Africa Israel Investments.

In March 2017, Senator Chuck Grassley filed a complaint alleging that the Human Rights Accountability Global Initiative foundation, Akhmetshin, Prevezon Holdings, and Fusion GPS had violated the Foreign Agents Registration Act.

In a 14 July 2017, interview with The Wall Street Journal, Veselnitskaya acknowledged that she was in regular contact with the Russian prosecutor general's office and with Prosecutor General Yury Chaika "while waging a campaign against U.S. sanctions".

On 3 November 2017, a judge denied a request for Veselnitskaya to enter the U.S. to attend hearings related to the money laundering case.

On 8 January 2019, Veselnitskaya was indicted for obstruction of justice by the office of the U.S. Attorney for the Southern District of New York, in connection with a 2015 money laundering case. She was accused of submitting an intentionally misleading statement to the court – a report exonerating her client Katsyv which she claimed was the result of an investigation by the Russian government, when in fact she had helped to draft the report. Veselnitskaya was believed to be in Russia at the time of the indictment and is unlikely to appear in a U.S. court as Russia does not extradite its citizens to other countries.

On 11 April 2016, while on a trip to Moscow, Dana Rohrabacher obtained from Yuri Chaika a confidential memo of accusations against prominent donors to the Democratic Party. Veselnitskaya delivered a very similar document, with some portions word for word the same, at the Trump Tower meeting on 9 June 2016. He met with Rinat Akhmetshin in Berlin to discuss Prevezon and later Rohrabacher was a staunch supporter of Prevezon's interests. According to Barry Meier, Veselnitskaya and Denis Katsyv received critical information for Prevezon from Glenn Simpson and his Fusion GPS which had been hired to support her efforts through Mark Cymrot and John Moscow of the BakerHostetler law firm. Because of these actions, Bill Browder believed that the Foreign Agents Registration Act (FARA) had been violated.

== Personal life ==
Veselnitskaya was formerly married to Aleksandr Mitusov, a former deputy transportation minister of the Moscow area while Petr Katsyv, Denis Katsyv's father, was the main director.

== U.S. indictment ==
In January 2019, Veselnitskaya was charged with one count of obstruction of justice.

== See also ==
- Russian espionage in the United States
- Russian interference in the 2016 United States elections
