= Fusion GPS =

Commercial research and strategic intelligence firm based in Washington D.C.

- Founded: 2011; 15 years ago
- Headquarters: Washington, D.C.
- Key people: Glenn R. Simpson
- Website: www.fusiongps.com

Fusion GPS is an opposition research and strategic intelligence firm based in Washington, D.C. The company conducts open-source investigations and provides research and strategic advice for businesses, law firms and investors, and political campaigns. The "GPS" initialism is derived from "Global research, Political analysis, Strategic insight".

== History ==
The company was co-founded in 2011 by Glenn R. Simpson, a former investigative reporter and journalist for Roll Call and The Wall Street Journal and Peter Fritsch, a former Wall Street Journal senior editor.

== Work ==
=== Opposition research on Mitt Romney ===
Fusion GPS was hired in 2012 to do opposition research on U.S. presidential candidate Mitt Romney. In February 2012, the magazine Mother Jones published an article on Frank VanderSloot and his company Melaleuca, who combined had given $1 million to a super PAC supporting Mitt Romney. In January 2013, VanderSloot sued Mother Jones for defamation in the February 2012 article. In the course of the litigation, VanderSloot deposed Fusion GPS founder Simpson on the "theory that Mother Jones conspired with Obama's team to defame VanderSloot". The seventh Judicial District Court of the State of Idaho dismissed the lawsuit in 2015.

=== Planned Parenthood ===
In August 2015, Planned Parenthood retained Fusion GPS to defensively investigate the veracity of a series of undercover videos released by anti-abortion activists David Daleiden and Sandra Merritt from The Center for Medical Progress that they claimed showed Planned Parenthood officials agreeing to sell fetal tissues obtained through abortions to medical researchers. Fusion GPS hired video and transcription experts to analyze the videos and summarized the findings in a forensic report. The report claimed that the "unedited" videos posted by activists had in fact been "heavily edited". The anti-abortion activists attributed the gaps to "bathroom breaks and waiting periods." The report was provided to U.S. congressional leadership as evidence, as they were considering funding and other issues related to Planned Parenthood operations.

After a grand jury declined to indict Planned Parenthood of any wrongdoing, on March 28, 2017, Daleiden and Merritt were charged with 15 felonies in the State of California: one for each of the people whom they had filmed without consent, and one for criminal conspiracy to invade privacy. After several years of legal challenges and rulings, Daleiden and Sandra Merritt were arraigned in February 2020 and pleaded not guilty to multiple counts of criminal invasion of privacy. On Daleiden and Merritt's appeal, Superior Court Judge Suzanne Bolanos decided in July 2020 that prosecutors could try Daleiden on nine counts and Merritt on eight.

=== Prevezon Holding ===
In 2013, the US Department of Justice, represented by the US Attorney for the Southern District of New York, Preet Bharara, sued Prevezon Holding, a Republic of Cyprus corporation registered in New York as a foreign business corporation, under the US Global Magnitsky Act for money-laundering part of $230 million in stolen funds. The lawsuit sought forfeiture of various Prevezon assets and real estate holdings in the US. The sole shareholder of Prevezon was Russian citizen Denis Katsyv, whose father is Petr Katsyv, vice president of Russia's state-run rail monopoly and according to Matt Taibbi's coverage for Rolling Stone, "reportedly a business associate of Vladimir Yakunin, a confidant of Vladimir Putin". Because Katsyv's Russian lawyer, Natalia Veselnitskaya, was not licensed to practice in the US, Katsyv hired the law firm of BakerHostetler to represent Prevezon; BakerHostetler then hired Fusion GPS in early 2014 to provide research help for the litigation. As part of that litigation support for BakerHostetler, Fusion GPS investigated Bill Browder, a witness central to the U.S. Justice Department's case.

On October 18, 2016, the court disqualified BakerHostetler from the case because they had represented Browder's hedge fund Hermitage Capital Management for nine months from 2008 to 2009 when the U.S. Justice Department was investigating a tax fraud scheme in Russia involving "co-opted Hermitage portfolio companies". The U.S. Justice Department had argued that Hermitage Capital was a victim of the tax fraud and that BakerHofstetler's prior work on behalf of Hermitage Capital created a conflict of interest in representing Katsyv and Prevezon.

Browder lodged a complaint with the U.S. Justice Department in December 2016 that Fusion GPS may have lobbied "for Russian interests in a campaign to oppose the pending Global Magnitsky Act [and] failed to register under [U.S. law]".{ The US Global Magnitsky Act, not to be confused with Magnitsky legislation, is a human rights law passed on December 23, 2016. It is named after Sergei Magnitsky, a lawyer and auditor working for Browder who died in a Russian prison after uncovering a corruption scheme that he was then charged with having helped concoct.

In May 2017, the Prevezon lawsuit was settled for $6 million, less than half what Bharara sought. Prevezon did not admit to any wrongdoing and both sides claimed victory.

==== Prevezon and FARA violation inquiry ====
On March 30, 2017, Senate Judiciary Chairman Chuck Grassley, R-Iowa called for a U.S. Department of Justice investigation into purported connections between Fusion GPS and Russia, and an inquiry as to whether Fusion GPS was acting as an unregistered foreign agent. Grassley's concern was whether the Russian government paid for Fusion's work on the Prevezon defense while Fusion was collaborating with Christopher Steele to produce the salacious Steele dossier. The company denied the claims that they were engaged in lobbying or had violated the Foreign Agents Registration Act.

Shortly after the settlement of the Prevezon lawsuit in July 2017, Fusion GPS accused the White House of trying to "smear" it for investigating President Trump's alleged ties to Russia. White House press secretary Sarah Huckabee Sanders said that ongoing investigations into potential ties between Trump's 2016 election campaign and Moscow were political ploys to undermine his presidency. Fusion GPS countered that it merely worked with a law firm (BakerHostetler) "to provide support for civil litigation" unrelated to Russian efforts to do away with the Magnitsky Act, saying it had no reason to register under the Foreign Agents Registration Act (FARA).

According to a "Fact Checker" column written by Glenn Kessler, prior to any Congressional investigations, there was "no evidence that the Russian government paid for Fusion’s work on the Prevezon defense at the same time Fusion investigated Trump’s business dealings in Russia."

=== Trump–Russia dossier and Christopher Steele ===
In September 2015, Fusion GPS was hired by The Washington Free Beacon, a conservative political website, to do opposition research on Trump and other Republican presidential candidates. In spring 2016, when Trump had emerged as the probable Republican candidate, the Free Beacon stopped funding the investigation into Trump.

From April 2016 through October 2016, the law firm Perkins Coie, on behalf of the Hillary Clinton 2016 presidential campaign and the Democratic National Committee, retained Fusion GPS to continue opposition research on Trump. In June 2016, Fusion GPS retained Christopher Steele, a private British corporate intelligence investigator and former MI-6 agent, to research any Russian connections to Trump. Steele produced a 35-page series of uncorroborated memos from June to December 2016, which became the document known as the Steele dossier. Fusion GPS provided Marc Elias, the lead election lawyer for Perkins Coie, with the resulting dossier and other research documents.

In March 2022, the Federal Election Commission fined the Clinton campaign $8,000 and the DNC $105,000 for misreporting the funding as "legal services" rather than opposition research expenditures. The ruling followed a 2018 complaint by the Coolidge Reagan Foundation; the FEC dismissed related complaints against Steele, Perkins Coie, and Fusion GPS. In November 2025, Senator Chuck Grassley released FBI documents indicating the bureau had sought authorization in 2019 to investigate the Clinton campaign and DNC for the misreported payments, but DOJ officials Richard Pilger and J.P. Cooney declined to authorize the investigation.

=== House Intelligence Committee investigation ===
On October 4, 2017, Chairman Devin Nunes of the House Intelligence Committee issued subpoenas to the management of Fusion GPS, demanding documents and testimony in late October and early November 2017. According to a Democratic committee source, the subpoenas were issued unilaterally by the Republican majority of the committee.

On October 18, 2017, the House Intelligence Committee held a private meeting with two executives of Fusion GPS, Peter Fritsch, and Thomas Catan. The purpose was to seek information about their creation of "the opposition-research dossier that makes salacious claims about President Donald Trump’s ties to Russia." Fritsch and Catan refused to answer the House Intelligence Committee's questions by invoking their Fifth Amendment right against self-incrimination. Their attorney, Joshua Levy, said that they would cooperate with "serious" investigations but that a "Trump cabal has carried out a campaign to demonize our client for having been tied to the Trump dossier."

On October 23, 2017, Fusion GPS filed for a court injunction against Nunes' subpoena seeking the firm's bank records for a period of more than two years, arguing it would damage and possibly destroy the business as well as violate their First Amendment rights. On January 4, 2018, U.S. District Court Judge Richard J. Leon struck down Fusion's application, ruling that Fusion's bank must turn over the financial records subpoenaed by the House Intelligence Committee; Fusion asked the judge to stay his order because they planned to appeal.

On October 28, 2017, The Washington Free Beacon told the House Intelligence Committee that it had retained Fusion GPS's services from 2015 to May 2016, to research Donald Trump and other Republican presidential candidates. The objective was the discovery of damaging information. The Free Beacon and its primary source of funding, hedge fund manager Paul Singer, denied any involvement in the creation of the Steele dossier, pointing out that they had stopped funding research on Trump before Steele was engaged.

The committee interviewed Simpson for seven hours on November 14, 2017. The transcript of the interview was released on January 18, 2018.

== Senate Judiciary Committee investigations ==
Senate Judiciary Committee Chairman Grassley and ranking Democrat Dianne Feinstein made arrangements in July 2017 for Fusion GPS co-founder Glenn Simpson to testify before their committee. It was agreed that Simpson would not testify in public but would be interviewed privately. The committee wanted to question Simpson about the Foreign Agents Registration Act (FARA). A previous witness, Bill Browder, had accused Simpson and Fusion GPS of evading registration as foreign agents for campaigning to influence and overturn the Magnitsky Act. Fusion GPS said through their attorney that they were not required to register under FARA. Senators were expected to also use the hearing "to press Justice Department officials on what they know about Veselnitskaya, Prevezon, Fusion GPS and their connections to both the Trump campaign or the Russian government."

On August 22, 2017, Simpson was questioned for 10 hours by the Senate Judiciary Committee in a closed-door meeting. The Committee did not release a transcript of the hearing, but indicated that Fusion GPS had given more than 40,000 highly redacted documents for the investigation. Simpson kept the identities of the firm's clients confidential; the client names—The Washington Free Beacon, and the law firm Perkins Coie representing the DNC and the Clinton presidential campaign—were revealed to the House Intelligence Committee (but not the public) in October 2017, during the committee's investigation.

On January 2, 2018, Simpson and Fritsch co-authored an op-ed in The New York Times, requesting the House and Senate committees to "release full transcripts of our firm's testimony". On January 8, 2018, a spokesman for Grassley said he did not plan to release the transcript of Simpson's August 22, 2017, testimony before the Senate Judiciary Committee. The next day, January 9, 2018, Feinstein released the transcript.

== Litigation ==
=== Filed by Alfa Bank co-owners ===
Three Alfa-Bank owners named in the dossier as connected to Putin sued Fusion GPS and Glenn Simpson for libel and defamation. The lawsuit was continuing as of October 2020. German Khan, one of the litigants and one of Russia's wealthiest citizens, is the father-in-law of Dutch attorney Alex van der Zwaan, who was charged in the Mueller probe for making false statements to the FBI.

=== Filed by Cohen ===
On January 9, 2018, Michael Cohen sued BuzzFeed and Fusion GPS for defamation over allegations about him in the dossier. On April 19, 2018, ten days after his home, office, and hotel room were raided by the FBI as part of a criminal investigation, Cohen filed a motion to voluntarily dismiss the suit.

=== Shervin Pishevar ===
Billionaire Shervin Pishevar, the victim of a fake police report indicating that he raped a woman in a London hotel in May 2017, alleged in court that Fusion GPS created the forgery, then leaked it to a reporter at Fast Company in order to defame his character.

== See also ==
- 2016 Democratic National Committee email leak
- Russian interference in the 2016 United States elections
