= Mueller special counsel investigation =

U.S. investigation into Russian interference in U.S. elections

The order dated May 17, 2017, appointing a special counsel to investigate Russian interference in the 2016 United States elections

On April 18, 2019, a redacted version of the 448-page Report on the Investigation into Russian Interference in the 2016 Presidential Election was released to the American public.

The Robert Mueller special counsel investigation was a criminal investigation into associates of 45th U.S. president Donald Trump and Russian president Vladimir Putin regarding Russian interference in the 2016 United States elections and was conducted by special prosecutor Robert Mueller from May 2017 to March 2019. It was also called the Russia investigation, Mueller probe, and Mueller investigation.

The investigation focused on four points:

1. Russian interference in the 2016 United States elections
2. Trump associates and their connection to Russian officials and espionage
3. Possible obstruction of justice by Trump and his associates
4. Potential "conspiracy" or "coordination" between the Trump campaign and Russia

The investigation did not focus on "collusion", because collusion "is not a specific offense or theory of liability found in the United States Code, nor is it a term of art in federal criminal law".

While the investigation found no evidence that President Trump or any of his aides "coordinated" with the Russian government's 2016 election interference, and there was insufficient evidence of a criminal "conspiracy", members of the campaign were indicted, including national security advisor Michael Flynn and the chair of the Trump presidential campaign, Paul Manafort. The investigation resulted in charges against 34 individuals and three companies, eight guilty pleas, and a conviction at trial. The report did not reach a conclusion about possible obstruction of justice by Trump, citing a Justice Department guideline that prohibits the federal indictment of a sitting president. However, Attorney General William Barr pointed to ten episodes of potential obstruction.

The investigation was created by Deputy Attorney General Rod Rosenstein. Former FBI director Mueller was chosen to lead due to a shortage of senate-confirmed U.S. attorneys. The dismissal of James Comey was a factor in the decision to use a Special Counsel. The Mueller investigation took over the FBI's investigation, Crossfire Hurricane. The Mueller investigation's scope included allegations of "links and/or coordination" between the Russian government and individuals associated with the Trump campaign. Mueller was mandated to pursue "any matters that arose or may arise directly from the investigation." The probe included a criminal investigation that looked into potential conspiracy and obstruction of justice charges against Trump and members of his campaign or his administration.

The investigation concluded in March 2019. The report concluded that the Russian Internet Research Agency's social media campaign supported Trump's presidential candidacy while attacking Clinton's, and Russian intelligence hacked and released damaging material from the Clinton campaign and Democratic Party organizations. The investigation "identified numerous links between the Russian government and the Trump campaign", and determined that the Trump campaign "expected it would benefit electorally" from Russian hacking efforts. However, "the investigation did not establish that members of the Trump campaign conspired or coordinated with the Russian government in its election interference activities".

On potential obstruction of justice by Trump, the investigation "does not conclude that the President committed a crime", as investigators would not indict a sitting president per an Office of Legal Counsel opinion. However, the investigation "does not exonerate" Trump, finding public and private actions "by the President that were capable of exerting undue influence over law enforcement investigations". The report states that Congress can decide whether Trump obstructed justice, and has the authority to take action against him. Attorney General William Barr and Deputy Attorney General Rod Rosenstein, decided on March 24, 2019, that the evidence was insufficient to establish a finding Trump committed obstruction of justice. Upon his resignation in May 2019, Mueller stated, "The Constitution requires a process other than the criminal justice system to formally accuse a sitting president of wrongdoing." In July 2019, Mueller testified to Congress that a president could be charged with obstruction of justice, or other crimes, after he left office.

== Original claims of Russian election involvement ==
The first public US government assertion of Russian efforts to influence the 2016 election came in a joint statement on September 22, 2016, by Senator Dianne Feinstein and House member Adam Schiff, the top Democrats on the Senate and House Intelligence Committees, respectively. The US Intelligence Community released a similar statement fifteen days later.

In January 2017, an assessment was released by the Office of the Director of National Intelligence, then headed by Obama appointee James Clapper, which asserted that Russian leadership had favored presidential candidate Donald Trump over rival candidate Hillary Clinton, adding that Russian President Vladimir Putin had personally ordered an "influence campaign" to harm Clinton's electoral chances and "undermine public faith in the US democratic process". The Russian government interfered in the 2016 presidential election by bolstering the candidacies of Trump, Bernie Sanders, and Jill Stein in order to increase political instability in the United States as well as to damage the Clinton presidential campaign.

== Origin and powers ==
=== Original FBI investigations ===
When the special counsel was appointed by Rod Rosenstein in May 2017, the special counsel took over an existing counterintelligence investigation by the Federal Bureau of Investigation (FBI) into Russian interference in the 2016 United States elections and numerous secretive links between Trump associates and Russian officials. According to reports, Australian officials informed American officials that in May 2016, a Trump presidential campaign adviser, George Papadopoulos, told the Australian High Commissioner to Britain, Alexander Downer, that Russian officials were in possession of politically damaging information relating to Hillary Clinton, the rival presidential candidate to Trump from Democratic Party. Since the FBI, in response to this information, opened an investigation into the links between Trump associates and Russian officials on July 31, 2016, the meeting between Papadopoulos and Downer is considered to be the 'spark' that led to the Mueller investigation. In February 2018, the Nunes memo, written by staff for U.S. Representative Devin Nunes, stated that the information on Papadopoulos "triggered the opening of" the original FBI investigation, rather than the Steele dossier by Christopher Steele as asserted by Trump and his allies.

The special counsel also took over an FBI investigation on whether President Trump had committed obstruction of justice, which began within eight days after Trump's dismissal of FBI Director James Comey. CNN reported in December 2018 that then-acting FBI Director Andrew McCabe started the investigation based on Comey's firing—which had been recommended in writing by Rosenstein in what became known as the Comey memo—and also Comey's allegation that Trump had asked him to stop investigating Trump's former national security adviser Michael Flynn. In February 2019, McCabe confirmed he launched the obstruction of justice investigation for those reasons—before he was fired from the FBI for allegedly lying to FBI agents after he leaked information about an investigation into the Clinton Foundation to a reporter. He said he gave additional reasons such as Trump's multiple depictions of the investigation into Trump associates and Russia as a "witch hunt", as well as Trump allegedly telling Deputy Attorney General Rod Rosenstein to mention the Russia probe in Rosenstein's memo to recommend firing Comey, and Trump's comments to the Russian ambassador and NBC relating Comey's firing to the Russia probe.

=== Appointment and original oversight ===
Former Attorney General Jeff Sessions issues statement announcing his recusal.

A special counsel investigation is subject to oversight by the attorney general. After questions arose regarding contacts between then-senator Jeff Sessions and Russian ambassador Sergei Kislyak in 2016, one of the first things Sessions did after being appointed attorney general, was to recuse himself from any Justice Department investigations regarding Russian interference in the election.

Once Attorney General Sessions recused, oversight of any Russia investigation into the 2016 election fell to the Deputy Attorney General Rod Rosenstein, a Trump appointee. As part of his oversight, Rosenstein appointed Robert Mueller as special counsel in May 2017 with the mandate "to oversee the previously-confirmed FBI investigation of Russian government efforts to influence the 2016 presidential election and related matters".

Rosenstein has said he would recuse himself from supervision of Mueller if he himself were to become a subject in the investigation due to his role in the dismissal of Comey.

=== Reasons for appointing a special counsel ===
==== Firing of James Comey ====
The special counsel appointment on May 17, 2017, came after protests, mostly from Democrats, over President Trump firing the FBI Director James Comey on May 9, 2017. In Congress, in reaction to Comey's firing, over 130 Democratic lawmakers called for a special counsel to be appointed, over 80 Democratic lawmakers called for an independent investigation, while over 40 Republican lawmakers expressed questions or concerns. Complicating the situation, Comey arranged to leak to the press classified information, notes from an interview with the president where Trump asked him to end the probe into Michael Flynn. Comey would later be rebuked by the Department of Justice's Office of Inspector General for this action. Trump fired Comey on the recommendations of Attorney General Jeff Sessions and Deputy Attorney General Rod Rosenstein, although Deputy Director of the FBI Andrew McCabe claimed Rosenstein did not want to write the recommendation to fire Comey, and only did so because Trump ordered him to.

The New York Times reported on January 11, 2019, that FBI counterintelligence grew concerned about Trump's ties to Russia during the 2016 campaign but held off opening an investigation because of uncertainty about how to proceed on such a sensitive matter. Trump's behavior during the days immediately before and after Comey's firing caused them to begin investigating whether Trump had been working on behalf of Russia against U.S. interests, knowingly or unknowingly. The FBI merged that counterintelligence investigation with a criminal obstruction of justice investigation related to Comey's firing. Mueller took over that investigation upon his appointment, although it was not immediately clear if he had pursued the counterintelligence angle.

The New York Times reported in August 2020 that Rosenstein curtailed a May 2017 FBI inquiry into Trump's personal and financial dealings in Russia, giving the bureau the impression that the special counsel would investigate it, though Rosenstein instructed Mueller not to.

==== Authority ====
Deputy Attorney General Rod Rosenstein, in his role as Acting Attorney General for matters related to the campaign due to the recusal of Attorney General Jeff Sessions, appointed Mueller, a former Director of the FBI, to serve as Special Counsel for the United States Department of Justice (DOJ) with authority to investigate Russian interference in the 2016 United States elections, including exploring any links or coordination between Trump's 2016 presidential campaign and the Russian government; "any matters that arose or may arise directly from the investigation"; and any other matters within the scope of 28 C.F.R. § 600.4(a).

As Rosenstein later informed Congress, he elected to use a Special Counsel rather than have the FBI itself oversee the investigation because he did not believe acting Director of the FBI Andrew McCabe was the right person to lead the investigation. Instead, he would appoint a Special Counsel, as had been done in the past. U.S. Attorneys serve as special counsel, but in May 2017 there were only three Senate-confirmed U.S. Attorneys serving at the time, the Senate having not yet confirmed the new president's nominees, and those three had remained as holdovers from the previous administration pending the arrival of the new attorneys. As a result, Rosenstein decided to select Robert Mueller, though he was retired, because of his reputation.

As special counsel, Mueller had the power to issue subpoenas, hire staff members, request funding, and prosecute federal crimes in connection with the election interference along with other crimes he may uncover. The constitutionality of indicting a sitting president remains an unsettled legal question.

=== Release of findings ===
On April 18, 2019, a redacted version of the Report on the Investigation into Russian Interference in the 2016 Presidential Election was released to the public.

The Special Counsel law requires a special counsel to confidentially provide the current attorney general with a report of findings. The attorney general, in this case William Barr, is then required to provide a summary of the findings to Congress, although he has considerable discretion in how much detail he provides. The full release of the Mueller findings to Congress and the public is not assured. Should Congress be dissatisfied with the summary it is provided, it could subpoena Mueller's full report, and, if necessary, sue in federal court. Congress could also call Mueller to testify.

White House attorneys expect to preview whatever findings Barr decides to provide to Congress and the public, in order to consider asserting executive privilege to withhold the release of information gleaned from internal documents and interviews with White House officials. Commentators have noted that executive privilege cannot be invoked if the purpose is to shield wrongdoing or unlawful conduct.

On March 14, 2019, the House voted 420–0 in favor of a non-binding resolution calling for the full special counsel report to be released to Congress and the public, excluding classified or grand jury information. The same day the bill was brought before the Senate for unanimous consent, but was blocked by Senator Lindsey Graham, who said it needed a clause requiring the appointment of a special counsel to investigate allegations against the 2016 Clinton campaign. On March 15, Trump stated "there should be no Mueller Report" because "this was an illegal & conflicted investigation." Five days later he stated, "I told the House, 'If you want, let [the public] see it,'" adding, "that's up to the Attorney General." On March 25, 2019, Senate majority leader Mitch McConnell blocked an effort by minority leader Chuck Schumer for the Senate to take up the same resolution approved by the House eleven days earlier.

The special counsel delivered its report to Attorney General Barr on March 22, 2019. Two days later, on March 24, Barr sent a four-page letter of the report to Congress, describing the conclusions on Russian interference in the 2016 presidential election and obstruction of justice.

Barr said the report would be delivered to Congress by mid-April, with some redactions of any information that would "potentially compromise sources and methods" or "unduly infringe on the personal privacy and reputational interests of peripheral third parties". A two-volume redacted version of the full report was publicly released on April 18, 2019. A less-redacted version of the report will eventually provided to a limited number of members of Congress.

== Grand juries ==
On August 3, 2017, Mueller empaneled a grand jury in Washington, D.C., as part of his investigation. The grand jury has the power to subpoena documents, require witnesses to testify under oath, and issue indictments for targets of criminal charges if probable cause is found.

The Washingtonian grand jury is separate from an earlier Virginian grand jury investigating Michael Flynn; the Flynn case has been absorbed into Mueller's overall investigation.

The grand jury has issued subpoenas to those involved in the Trump Tower meeting held on June 9, 2016, at Trump Tower, which was also the location of Trump's presidential campaign headquarters.

- Rinat Akhmetshin, a Russian-born lobbyist and former Soviet Army officer, a participant in the Donald Trump Jr. meeting, testified under oath for several hours on August 11, 2017.
- Sam Clovis, an Iowa radio talk show host who worked on Trump's 2016 Presidential campaign, testified during the week of August 23, 2017.
- Jason Maloni, spokesman for Paul Manafort, testified under oath for more than two hours on September 15, 2017. Maloni was employed by Manafort following the five months he served as Chairman of Trump's campaign for president in 2016, to answer questions about Manafort's involvement in Trump's campaign.
- Carter Page, a former foreign-policy adviser to Trump's presidential campaign
- George Nader, Lebanese-American businessman who unofficially advises UAE Crown Prince Mohammed bin Zayed Al-Nahyan, testified during the week preceding March 5, 2018.

NBC News reported on August 25, 2017, that "in recent days" the grand jury subpoenaed witness testimony from the executives of six public relations firms, who worked with Trump campaign chairman Paul Manafort on lobbying efforts in Ukraine.

On January 16, 2018, The New York Times reported that Steve Bannon was subpoenaed by Mueller to testify before the standing grand jury in Washington, DC. Reuters and CNN reported the next day that Bannon had struck a deal with Mueller's team to be interviewed by prosecutors instead of testifying before the grand jury. On February 15, 2018, multiple sources reported that those interviews had taken place over several days that week. TMZ reported that Kristin M. Davis, the "Manhattan Madam" who had previously worked for Roger Stone, was subpoenaed in June 2018. On August 10, 2018, federal judge Beryl A. Howell found Stone's former aide Andrew Miller to be in contempt of court for refusing to testify before the grand jury. Also that day, the Mueller investigation subpoenaed Randy Credico, whom Stone had described as his "backchannel" to Julian Assange. The Wall Street Journal reported on November 14, 2018, that Mueller's investigators are examining whether Stone engaged in witness tampering by intimidating Credico into supporting Stone's assertions.

Jerome Corsi, former Washington bureau chief of Infowars, was subpoenaed to appear on September 7, 2018, before a Mueller grand jury. Corsi's attorney said he expected his client to be asked about his association with Roger Stone, who had appeared to know in advance that WikiLeaks would release damaging information about the Clinton campaign.

== Legal teams ==
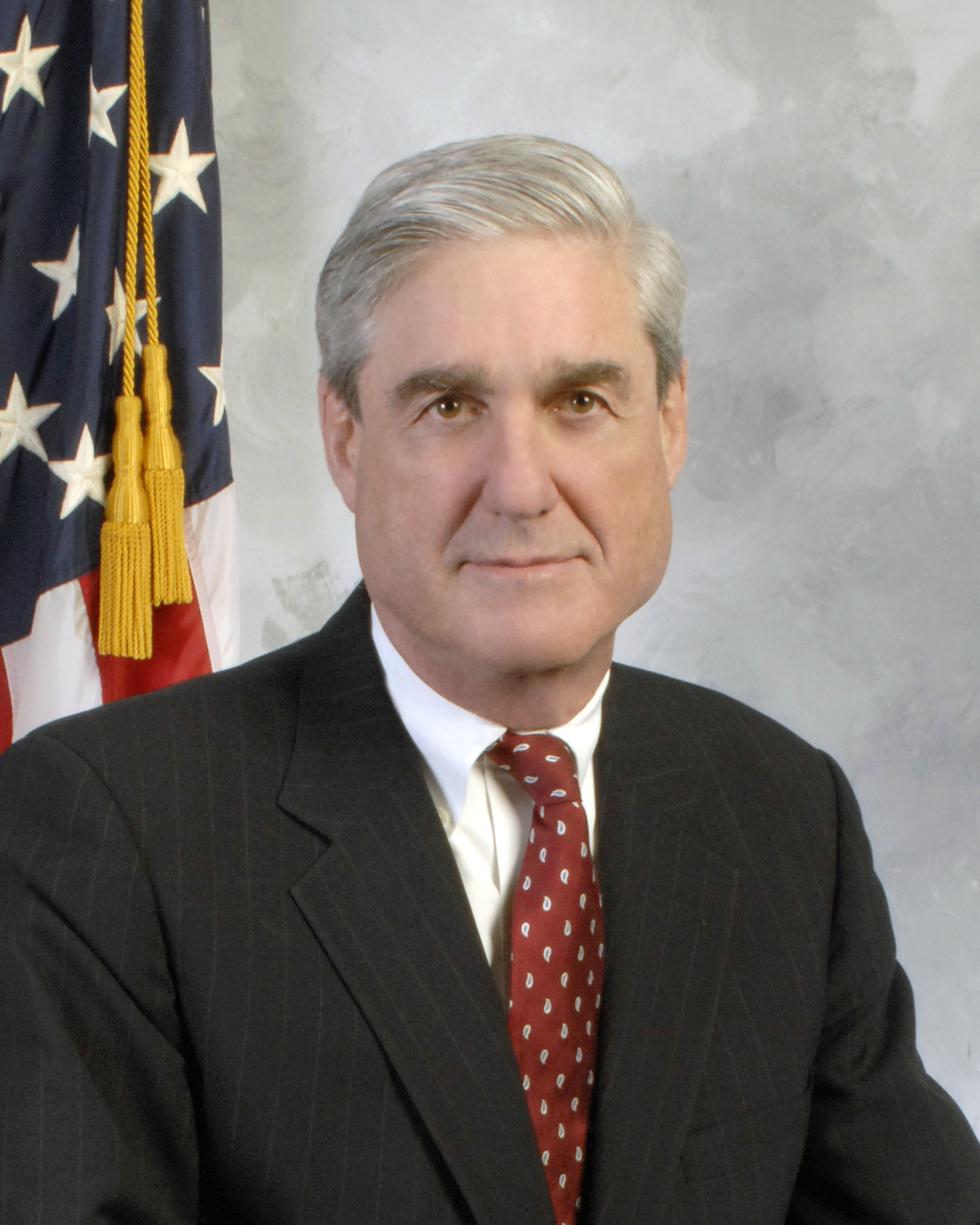
Robert Mueller was appointed in May 2017 as special counsel.

The investigation involved multiple legal teams: the attorneys that took part in the investigation (supervised by Special Counsel Robert Mueller); the team that defended President Trump in his personal capacity; and the team that represented the White House as an institution separate from the President.

According to CNN, as of August 2018, the prosecution team included 15 attorneys, led by Mueller. The additional supporting staff brought the number over 30. There were a few reported departures from Mueller's team.

The defense had two components: Emmet Flood representing the White House, and a team representing Trump personally, including Jay Sekulow, Andrew Ekonomou, Rudy Giuliani, the Raskin & Raskin law firm, and Joanna Hendon. Former members of the defense team include white-collar crimes expert John Dowd and Ty Cobb representing the office of the presidency.

Mueller's legal team was consistently attacked as biased against President Trump, who once referred to this team as "The 13 Angry Democrats". According to Politifact, while 13 of the 17 team members were indeed Democrats (the rest unaffiliated to either of the two major parties), Mueller is a registered Republican, and choosing to hire or not hire career attorneys on the basis of political affiliation is contrary to both Justice Department policy and federal law.

== Changes to oversight leadership ==
=== Whitaker's succession ===
As the Mueller investigation progressed, Trump repeatedly expressed anger over Attorney General Sessions' decision to recuse. In July 2017, Trump said that Sessions should have informed him about Sessions' impending recusal before Trump even nominated him, then Trump would have nominated someone else for attorney general. In May 2018, Trump said that he wished that he had nominated someone other than Sessions for Attorney General. In August 2018, Trump declared that Sessions' job was safe at least until the November 2018 United States midterm elections. Sessions resigned as attorney general on November 7, 2018, the day after the midterm elections, writing that he had resigned at Trump's request.

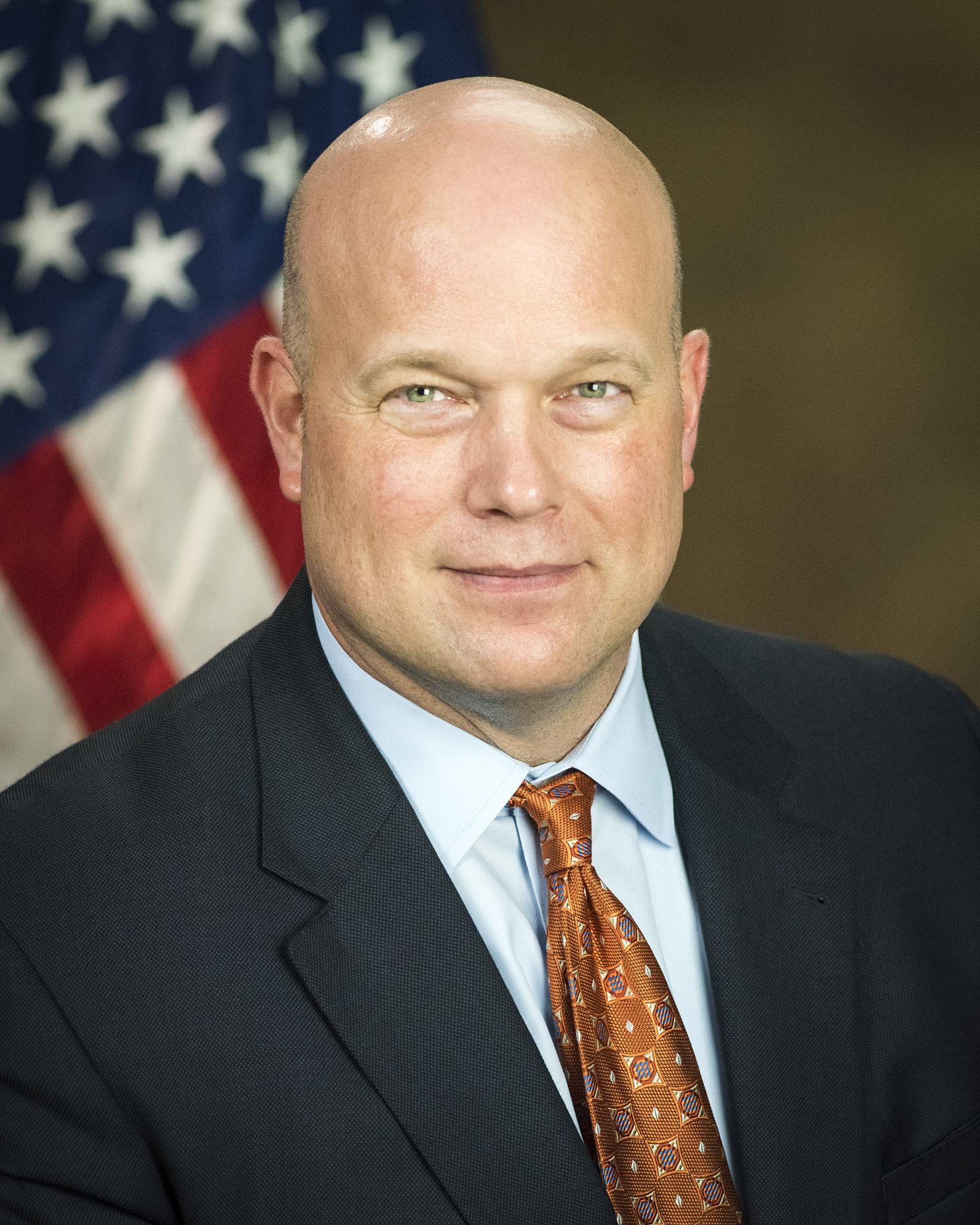
Matthew Whitaker, who served as the Acting Attorney General from November 2018 to February 2019

With Sessions' resignation, Trump appointed Matthew Whitaker, Sessions' chief of staff, as Acting Attorney General on November 7, 2018. This meant that Whitaker assumed oversight of the Mueller investigation from Deputy Attorney General Rosenstein.

Previously in August 2017, one month prior to joining the Justice Department as Sessions' chief of staff, Whitaker wrote an opinion column for CNN titled "Mueller's investigation of Trump is going too far". He stated that Mueller's investigation is a "lynch mob", that it should be limited and should not probe into Trump's finances. Whitaker also argued in 2017 that the Trump Tower meeting was neither improper nor evidence of collusion. The New York Times reported that White House aides and other people close to Trump anticipated that Whitaker would "rein in" the investigation.

Whitaker, a vocal Trump supporter, had publicly criticized the Mueller investigation on several occasions before joining the Justice Department in September 2017, asserting it was "going too far" and referring to it as a "lynch mob". Whitaker is also a personal friend of Sam Clovis, a former co-chair of the Trump campaign who has testified to Mueller's investigators and grand jury. Because of his prior statements and involvement, many Democrats and some Republicans have asserted that Whitaker's potential conflicts of interest require him to recuse himself from overseeing Mueller, although Whitaker reportedly indicated he had no intention of doing so. Justice Department ethics officials typically review conflicts of interest to recommend recusals, but their findings are not binding and are usually kept confidential.

=== Barr's succession ===
On December 7, 2018, President Trump declared that he would nominate William Barr for the vacant post of Attorney General. Barr was previously Attorney General under President George H. W. Bush.

During his January 2019 confirmation hearings, Barr suggested the investigation's findings could be withheld from the public, as their release is not mandated by law. In June 2018, Barr had sent an unsolicited 19-page memo to deputy attorney general Rod Rosenstein and Trump attorneys arguing that the Special Counsel's approach to potential obstruction of justice by Trump was "fatally misconceived" and that, based on his knowledge, Trump's actions were within his presidential authority. In June 2017, Barr had characterized the obstruction investigation as "asinine" and that it was "taking on the look of an entirely political operation to overthrow the president". Trump stated in a February 2019 interview that he had not committed to releasing the Mueller report.

On February 14, 2019, Barr was sworn in as attorney general after the Senate approved his appointment by a 54–45 vote that day, thus gaining oversight of the Mueller investigation from Whitaker.

== Topics ==
Deputy Attorney General Rod Rosenstein authorized Robert Mueller to investigate and prosecute "any links and/or coordination between the Russian government and individuals associated with the campaign of President Donald Trump", as well as "any matters that arose or may arise directly from the investigation" and any other matters within the scope of 28 CFR 600.4 – Jurisdiction.

The investigation's broad scope allowed Mueller to investigate many topics, including: Russian election interference; links between Trump associates and Russian officials; alleged conspiracy between Trump campaign and Russian agents; potential obstruction of justice; financial investigations; lobbyists; Trump as a subject of investigation; other topics; and the Facebook–Cambridge Analytica data scandal.

== Cost–benefit analysis ==
A cost–benefit analysis of the investigation shows a net benefit for the government, with far more income than expenses.

By December 2018, the investigation had cost approximately $32 million but gained approximately $48 million. More than half of the cost of the investigation was for personnel compensation and benefits. The gains were accrued primarily by uncovering unpaid taxes by targets in the investigation, seizing assets, and collecting fines.

== Criminal charges ==
The Special Counsel indicted 34 people—seven U.S. nationals, 26 Russian nationals, and one Dutch national—and three Russian organizations. Two additional individuals were charged as a result of referrals to other FBI offices.

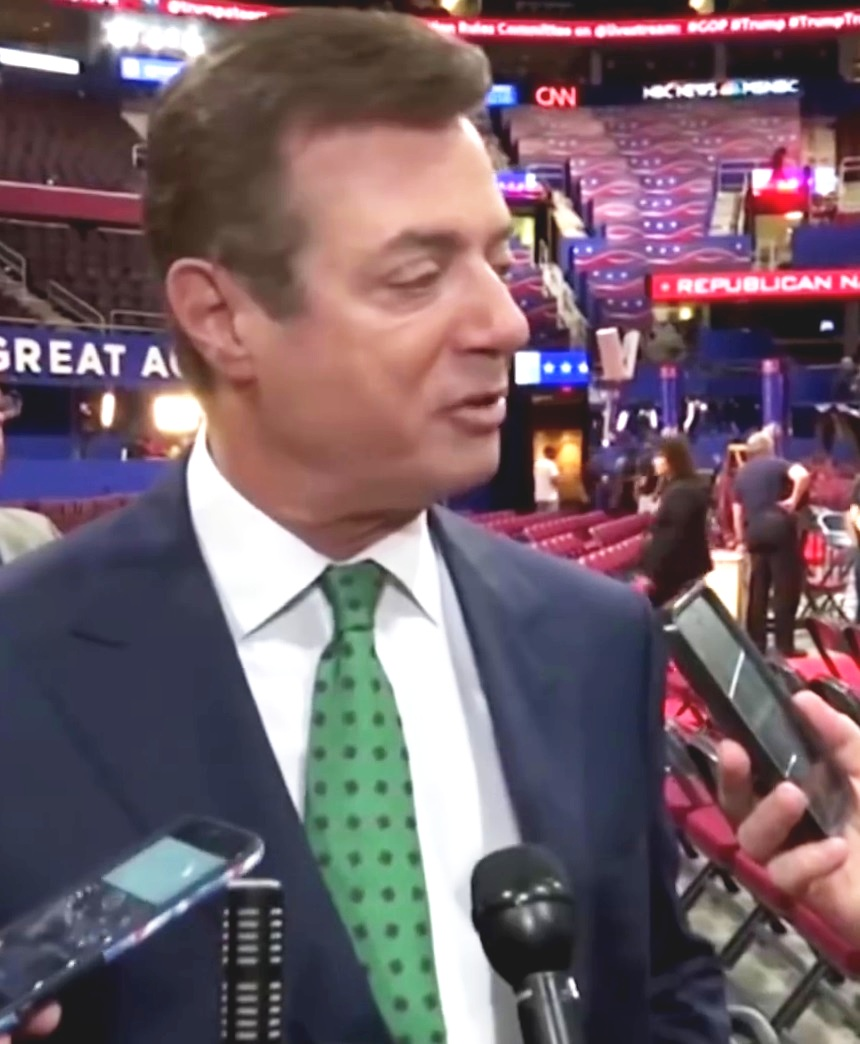
Manafort speaking to media at the 2016 Republican National Convention

Charges were filed against Trump campaign members George Papadopoulos, Paul Manafort, Rick Gates, Michael Flynn, and Michael Cohen. Charges were also filed against bank account seller Richard Pinedo, and lawyer Alex van der Zwaan as well as Paul Manafort associate Konstantin Kilimnik. Also indicted were Russia-based Internet Research Agency and related organizations and individuals directed by Yevgeny Prigozhin, and a group of Russian hackers referred to as Viktor Netyksho, et al. On March 16, 2020, the US government dropped the charges against Prigozhin-owned companies Concord Management and Consulting and Concord Catering.

Following the guilty plea of Michael Cohen for lying to the Senate Intelligence Committee, ranking member Mark Warner stated the committee had made multiple criminal referrals of individuals to Mueller and continues to examine witness testimonies for other false statements. The Democrat-controlled House Intelligence Committee voted in February 2019 to refer dozens of witness testimony transcripts and thousands of other documents to Mueller's office. Committee Republicans had blocked Democrat efforts to release the documents to Mueller's office when Republicans controlled the Committee in 2018.

On January 25, 2019, Roger Stone, a long time advisor to Donald Trump, was arrested by the FBI at a pre-dawn raid in Florida. The indictment filed by the Office of the Special Counsel contained 7 charges, including obstructing an official proceeding, witness tampering, and lying to congress in regard to the investigation into Russian interference in the 2016 US election and his involvement with WikiLeaks. In the charging document, prosecutors alleged that, after the first Wikileaks release of hacked DNC emails in July 2016, "a senior Trump Campaign official was directed to contact Stone about any additional releases and what other damaging information [WikiLeaks] had regarding the Clinton Campaign. Stone thereafter told the Trump Campaign about potential future releases of damaging material by [WikiLeaks]." The indictment also alleged that Stone had discussed Wikileaks releases with multiple senior Trump campaign officials. By the time of those contacts, it had been publicly reported that the DNC emails had been hacked by Russians and provided to Wikileaks. Stone was convicted of all charges in November 2019, after the conclusion of the investigation and his sentence was commuted by Trump.

=== Indictments ===
A total of thirty-four individuals and three companies were indicted by Mueller's investigators. Eight have pleaded guilty to or been convicted of felonies, including five Trump associates and campaign officials. None of those five convictions "involved a conspiracy between the campaign and Russians" and "Mueller did not charge or suggest charges for [...] whether the Trump campaign worked with the Russians to influence the election". The investigation was, however, more complex. On May 29, 2019, in a press conference, Mueller stated that "If we had confidence that the president clearly did not commit a crime, we would have said that. We did not, however, make a determination as to whether the president did commit a crime... A president cannot be charged with a federal crime while he is in office. That is unconstitutional. Even if the charge is kept under seal and hidden from public view – that too is prohibited."

Dozens of ongoing investigations originally handled by the Special Counsel's office were forwarded to district and state prosecutors, other Department of Justice (DoJ) branches, and other federal agencies. The following (in alphabetical order) were indicted during the Mueller investigation:

- 13 Russians implicated in election interference: Mueller's team indicted thirteen Russian citizens, the Internet Research Agency (IRA), Concord Management and Consulting and Concord Catering with conducting social media campaigns about the U.S. elections. Twelve of the Russian defendants, who were alleged to be members of the Russian GRU cyber espionage group known as Fancy Bear, were charged in June 2018 with hacking and leaking DNC emails. The other Russian indicted, who was not a direct employee of Fancy Bear, was Russian business tycoon Yevgeny Prigozhin, who was alleged to have served as the financier for the organization. The US government dropped all charges against Concord Management and Consulting and Concord Catering in March 2020. In November 2019, Time magazine reported that it was "unlikely that any of the Russians will ever face a trial in the United States, but the charges make it harder for them to travel overseas".
- Michael Cohen, Trump's personal lawyer, pled guilty to making hush payments to Stormy Daniels and Karen McDougal in violation of campaign finance laws, and was convicted for several unrelated counts of bank and tax fraud.
- Lieutenant General Michael Flynn, who had been appointed as National Security Advisor by the incoming Trump administration, was dismissed from his position and later pled guilty to making false statements to FBI investigators about his conversations with Russian Ambassador to the United States Sergey Kislyak during the presidential transition.
- Rick Gates, former Trump Deputy Campaign Chairman, was indicted along with Paul Manafort in October 2017 on charges related to their consultation work with pro-Russian political figures in Ukraine. The charges were dropped after he pleaded guilty to conspiracy against the United States for making false statements in the investigation into Russian interference in the 2016 United States elections.
- Konstantin Kilimnik, Manafort's business partner in Ukraine, was indicted for witness tampering at the behest of Manafort; Kilimnik is suspected of working for Russian intelligence.
- Paul Manafort, former Trump campaign chairman was found guilty on eight felony counts of tax evasion and bank fraud, pursuant to his earlier lobbying activities for the Party of Regions of former Ukrainian president Viktor Yanukovich. He later pled guilty to conspiracy to defraud and obstruction of justice; in total, he was sentenced to over seven years in jail in February 2018.
- George Papadopoulos, Trump campaign foreign policy adviser, was convicted for making false statements to the FBI.
- Roger Stone, a longtime Trump advisor who had met with a Russian person offering to sell derogatory financial information about Hillary Clinton, was indicted on seven charges of lying to Congress and witness tampering. He pled not guilty. The jury subsequently found him guilty on all seven counts.
- Alex van der Zwaan, a Dutch lawyer with the global law firm of Skadden, Arps, Slate, Meagher & Flom, he pleaded guilty to one count of making a false statement to investigators while answering questions about Russian interference in the 2016 United States elections.

== Conclusions ==
Letter from Attorney General William Barr to leaders of the House and Senate Judiciary Committees notifying them about conclusion of the investigation

=== Report sent to Attorney General ===
On March 22, 2019, the special counsel's office concluded their investigation and sent a report to the Department of Justice where it was received by Attorney General William Barr. Barr, at Trump's nomination, had become attorney general on February 14, 2019, gaining oversight of the investigation from Trump-appointed Acting Attorney General Matthew Whitaker. Whitaker had assumed oversight from Rosenstein on November 7, 2018, after the resignation of then-Attorney General Jeff Sessions, who had recused himself from the investigation. Both Barr and Whitaker had been critical of the Mueller investigation before their appointments. Barr has faced bipartisan pressure to release the full report to the public, to the maximum extent permissible by law.

On March 24, 2019, Attorney General Barr sent a four-page letter to Congress regarding the special counsel's findings regarding Russian interference and obstruction of justice. Barr said that on the question of Russian interference in the election, Mueller detailed two ways in which Russia attempted to influence the election, firstly disinformation and social media campaigns by the Internet Research Agency to cause social discord, and secondly computer hacking and strategic release of emails from the Hillary Clinton presidential campaign and Democratic Party organizations. However, Barr quoted the report as saying: "[T]he investigation did not establish that members of the Trump Campaign conspired or coordinated with the Russian government in its election interference activities."

On the question of obstruction of justice, Barr said no conclusion was reached by the special counsel, noting that Mueller wrote "while this report does not conclude that the President committed a crime, it also does not exonerate him". Barr and Rosenstein concluded that the evidence for obstruction of justice could not form the basis for a prosecution. On April 18, Barr and Rosenstein held a press conference ninety minutes before a redacted version of the report, titled Report on the Investigation into Russian Interference in the 2016 Presidential Election, was released to Congress and the public. A less-redacted version is planned to be accessible to "a bipartisan group of leaders from several Congressional committees".

=== Follow-up to Attorney General's letter ===
The New York Times reported on April 3, 2019, that some members of the special counsel had told associates that they believe Barr's letter did not adequately portray their findings, which they considered to be more troubling for Trump than reported. The next day, The Washington Post reported that members of Mueller's team, who spoke anonymously, reported that the evidence gathered on obstruction of justice was "much more acute than Barr suggested". These members of Mueller's team said they believed that the evidence showed Trump obstructed justice, but that the entire team could not draw a conclusion because they were split over the evidence and law. The Washington Post report did not explain why they believed their findings to be more serious than Barr's conclusions and it is unknown how many members of the special counsel hold these opinions.

Barr's letter quoted Mueller's report as stating, "the evidence does not establish that the President was involved in an underlying crime related to Russian election interference", leading Barr to write, "the evidence developed during the Special Counsel's investigation is not sufficient to establish that the President committed an obstruction-of-justice offense", and concluding, "while not determinative, the absence of such evidence bears upon the President's intent with respect to obstruction". Some legal analysts challenged Barr's reasoning that Trump would not have intended to obstruct justice solely because he knew he had not committed a crime, noting that one can have intent to obstruct justice for other reasons, such as protecting associates from harm.

In May 2021, federal judge Amy Berman Jackson ruled the Barr DOJ had misled her and Congress by asserting a heavily redacted March 2019 internal memorandum contained only deliberative analysis of whether Trump should be charged with obstruction of justice. Jackson had seen the unredacted memo and concluded it contained "strategic" analysis to justify a decision Barr had already made. She ordered the memo to be publicly released within two weeks, pending any appeal by the DOJ.

=== Congressional requests for full report ===
On April 3, 2019, the House Judiciary Committee, which did not receive the unredacted report by its April 2 deadline, voted 24–17 along party lines to approve a resolution which authorizes subpoenas of the full report. The resolution also authorized subpoenas related to five of President Donald Trump's former top advisers, including strategist Steve Bannon, communications director Hope Hicks, chief of staff Reince Priebus, former-White House counsel Donald McGahn and counsel Annie Donaldson.

The Justice Department discussed the report with White House attorneys, and Barr discussed it in an April 18, 2019, press conference, a few hours before its release to Congress and the public later that day.

On April 19, 2019, House Judiciary Chairman Jerry Nadler issued a subpoena for the release of the full unredacted report. On May 3, 2019, Nadler informed Barr that a subpoena had been issued giving him until May 6 to release the full unredacted Mueller Report to the House Judiciary Committee. On May 6, after Barr failed to meet the committee's deadline to release the full report, the committee agreed to hold a vote to start Contempt of Congress proceedings against Barr on May 8. A law issued in 1857 gives Congress the power to issue criminal charges for this matter. Trump's announcement of executive privilege came just hours before the House Judiciary Committee planned to vote on whether to hold Barr in contempt. On May 8, 2019, after Trump invoked executive privilege, the House Judiciary Committee voted unanimously to reject White House's assertion of executive privilege and approve a motion put forward by Rep. Matt Gaetz (R-Fl) which states that a vote to hold Barr in contempt would not "be construed as a directive for the Attorney General to violate Federal law or rules." In a 24–16 vote, the House Judiciary Committee voted to hold Barr in contempt.

=== Release of redacted report ===
On April 18, 2019, a redacted version of the Special Counsel's report titled Report on the Investigation into Russian Interference in the 2016 Presidential Election, was released to Congress and the public. About one-eighth of the lines in the public version were redacted. The report was in two volumes, the first about Russian interference in the election and potential involvement of Trump associates, and the second on possible obstruction of justice by Trump.

==== Russian interference ====
The report concluded that Russian interference in the 2016 presidential election did occur "in sweeping and systematic fashion" and "violated U.S. criminal law".

The first method detailed in the final report was the usage of the Internet Research Agency, waging "a social media campaign that favored presidential candidate Donald J. Trump and disparaged presidential candidate Hillary Clinton". The Internet Research Agency also sought to "provoke and amplify political and social discord in the United States".

The second method of Russian interference saw the Russian intelligence service, the GRU, hacking into email accounts owned by volunteers and employees of the Clinton presidential campaign, including that of campaign chairman John Podesta, and also hacking into "the computer networks of the Democratic Congressional Campaign Committee (DCCC) and the Democratic National Committee (DNC)". As a result, the GRU obtained hundreds of thousands of hacked documents, and the GRU proceeded by arranging releases of damaging hacked material via the WikiLeaks organization and also GRU's personas "DCLeaks" and "Guccifer 2.0".

The Russians had also hacked old Republican Party domains and emails, but, according to James Comey, "none of that was released", and there was no sign "that the Trump campaign or the current RNC was successfully hacked". According to the ODNI assessment, the Russians did not release the Republican content in the same way they did the Democrat's content.

==== Conspiracy vs collusion ====
The investigation did not establish that members of the 2016 Trump campaign "conspired" or "coordinated" with Russia and did not evaluate whether "collusion" occurred.

To establish whether a crime was committed by members of the Trump campaign with regard to Russian interference, investigators "applied the framework of conspiracy law", and not the concept of "collusion", because collusion "is not a specific offense or theory of liability found in the United States Code, nor is it a term of art in federal criminal law". They also investigated if members of the Trump campaign "coordinated" with Russia, using the definition of "coordination" as having "an agreement — tacit or express — between the Trump campaign and the Russian government on election interference". Investigators further elaborated that merely having "two parties taking actions that were informed by or responsive to the other's actions or interests" was not enough to establish coordination.

The report writes that the investigation "identified numerous links between the Russian government and the Trump campaign", found that Russia "perceived it would benefit from a Trump presidency" and that the 2016 Trump presidential campaign "expected it would benefit electorally" from Russian hacking efforts. However, ultimately "the investigation did not establish that members of the Trump campaign conspired or coordinated with the Russian government in its election interference activities". The evidence was not necessarily complete due to encrypted, deleted, or unsaved communications as well as false, incomplete, or declined testimony.

==== Obstruction of justice ====
The second volume of the report investigated the topic of obstruction of justice, describing ten episodes where Trump may have obstructed justice as president and one episode before he was elected, and analyzing each in terms of the criteria needed to constitute criminal obstruction. The investigation found both public and private actions "by the President that were capable of exerting undue influence over law enforcement investigations, including the Russian-interference and obstruction investigations". However, Trump mostly failed to influence it because his subordinates or associates refused to carry out his instructions. The Mueller team refrained from charging Trump with obstruction because investigators abided by a DOJ Office of Legal Counsel (OLC) opinion that a sitting president cannot stand trial, and they feared that charges would affect Trump's governing and possibly preempt a potential impeachment. In addition, investigators felt it would be unfair to accuse Trump of a crime without charges and without a trial in which he could clear his name. Since they had decided "not to make a traditional prosecutorial judgment" on whether to "initiate or decline a prosecution," the special counsel's office "did not draw ultimate conclusions about the President's conduct." The report "does not conclude that the president committed a crime", but specifically did not exonerate Trump on obstruction of justice, because investigators were not confident that Trump was innocent after examining his intent and actions. The report concluded that Congress has the authority to take further action against Trump on the question of obstruction of justice, stating that no one is above the law.

== End of investigation ==
On May 29, 2019, Mueller announced that he was retiring as special counsel and that the office would be shut down, and he spoke publicly about the report for the first time. Saying "[t]he report is my testimony," he indicated he would have nothing to say that wasn't already in the report. On the subject of obstruction of justice, he said he had been prohibited by Justice Department policy from charging the president with a crime and that any potential wrongdoing by a president must be addressed by a "process other than the criminal justice system". This suggested that the investigation could now be picked up by Congress. He stressed that the central conclusion of his investigation was "that there were multiple, systematic efforts to interfere in our election. That allegation deserves the attention of every American." He also stated: "If we had had confidence that the President clearly did not commit a crime, we would have said so. We did not, however, make a determination as to whether the president did commit a crime".

The House Judiciary and Intelligence committees subpoenaed Mueller on June 25, 2019, with a letter saying that "the American public deserves to hear directly from you about your investigation and conclusions." Mueller reluctantly agreed to testify publicly with a scheduled date of July 17. This date was later pushed back to July 24. During his testimony, Mueller answered Republican Representative Ken Buck that a president could be charged with obstruction of justice (or other crimes) after the president left office.

Following the Trump–Ukraine scandal, the Democratic-controlled House of Representatives launched an impeachment inquiry against Trump in September 2019 but did not pursue an article of impeachment related to the Mueller investigation.

== Investigations into origins of probes ==
There have been numerous calls and requests to open a counter-investigation into the origins of the FBI's Crossfire Hurricane probe, with attention on the Foreign Intelligence Surveillance Act (FISA) documents against Carter Page and the Steele dossier.

On April 9, 2019, Attorney General William Barr testified before the House Appropriations Subcommittee. Barr announced that the Department of Justice will be "reviewing the conduct" of the FBI's Russia probe. "I am reviewing the conduct of the investigation and trying to get my arms around all the aspects of the counterintelligence investigation that was conducted during the summer of 2016," Barr said. When asked whether he was suggesting that spying occurred, Barr said, "I think that spying did occur. But the question is whether it was predicated, adequately predicated. And I'm not suggesting it wasn't adequately predicated, but I need to explore that."

During Attorney General Barr's testimony before the Senate Judiciary Committee on May 1, Barr again said he was looking into the origins of the FBI's Russia probe. "Many people seem to assume that the only intelligence collection that occurred was a single confidential informant [referring to Stefan Halper] and a FISA warrant," Barr stated. "I’d like to find out whether that is in fact true. It strikes me as a fairly anemic effort if that was the counterintelligence effort designed to stop a threat as it's being represented." When asked by Republican Senator John Cornyn "Can we state with confidence that the Steele dossier was not part of the Russian disinformation campaign" Barr responded "No. That is one of the areas that I am reviewing. I'm concerned about it. And I don't think it's entirely speculative." When asked about FISA abuses by the DOJ and FBI during his testimony, Barr responded "These are the things I need to look at, and I have to say as I said before, to the extent that there was any overreach, it was a few people in the upper echelons of the (FBI) and perhaps the department, but those people are no longer there", Barr said.

Barr appointed a federal prosecutor, John Durham, to assist in the investigation. On October 24, 2019, news media reported that Durham had opened a criminal probe into the matter, giving him the power to empanel a grand jury and to compel testimony. On December 1, 2020, the Associated Press reported that Barr had appointed Durham as a Special Counsel under the federal statute governing such appointments to conduct an investigation into "…the investigation of Special Counsel Robert S. Mueller III," by which was meant the FBI personnel who worked on Crossfire Hurricane before joining the Mueller team.

On December 9, 2019, DOJ Inspector General Michael Horowitz released a report on the FBI's use of the FISA process and related matters, concluding that no "political bias or improper motivation influenced the FBI's decision to seek FISA authority on Carter Page," but also found 17 "significant inaccuracies and omissions" in the FBI's four FISA applications made to the Foreign Intelligence Surveillance Court to obtain warrants for the surveillance of Page.

On May 7, 2020, the United States House Permanent Select Committee on Intelligence released dozens of transcripts from the Russia probe which committee chairman Adam Schiff said "detail evidence of the Trump campaign's efforts to invite, make use of, and cover up Russia's help in the 2016 presidential election." Top officials from the Obama administration also testified that they had no empirical evidence of a conspiracy between Trump associates and Russian officials.

== See also ==
- Nobody Is Above the Law, a nationwide protest held on November 8, 2018
- RT America, the American arm of the Russian state media network RT
- Russian espionage in the United States
- Russian involvement in regime change
- Special Counsel Independence and Integrity Act, a proposed law that sought to protect the investigation
- Timelines related to Donald Trump and Russian interference in United States elections
