= Bill Browder =

British financier and political activist

Sir Bill Browder KCMG
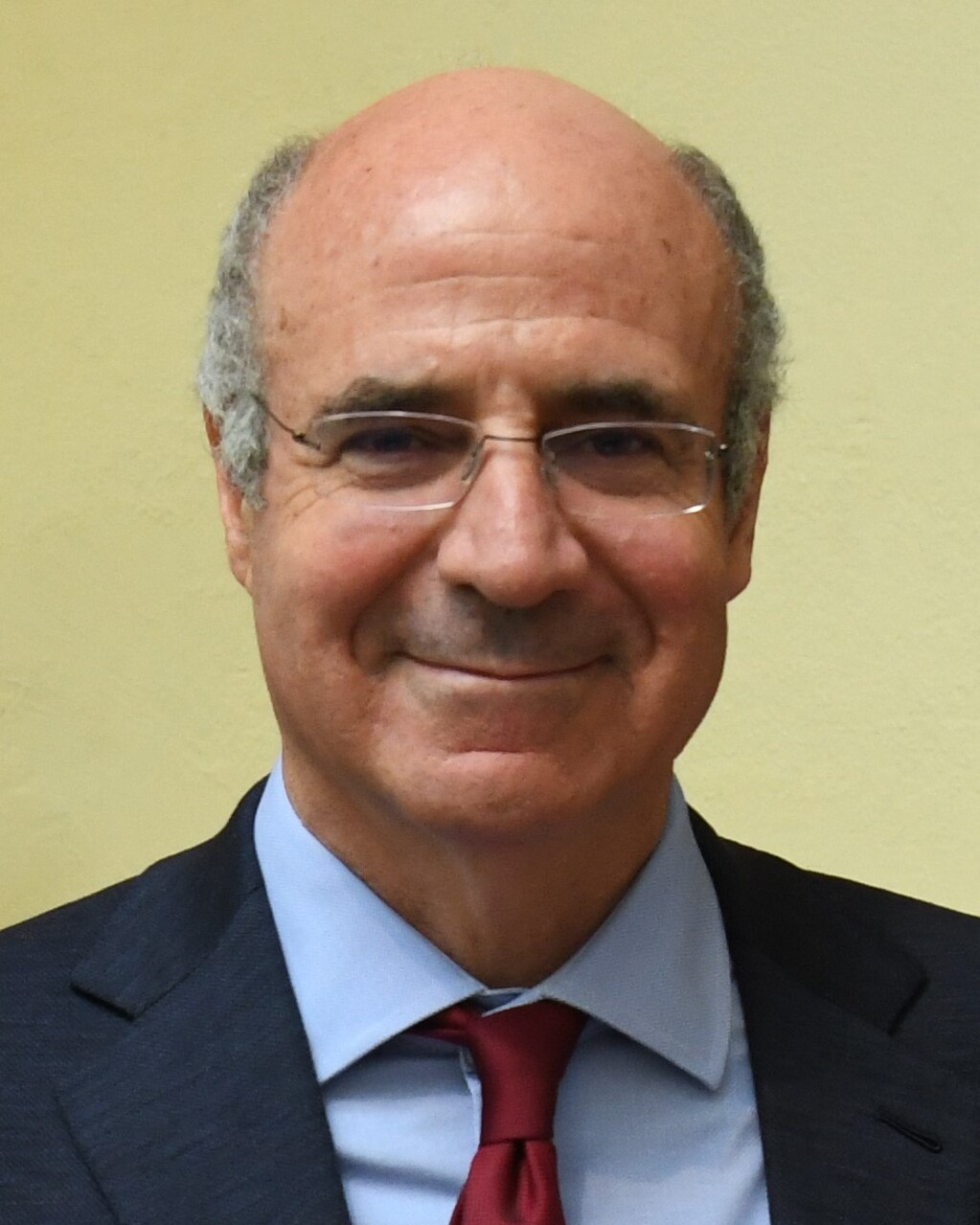
- Browder in 2023
- Born: William Felix Browder; 23 April 1964 (age 62); Princeton, New Jersey, U.S.
- Education: University of Colorado, Boulder (attended); University of Chicago (BSc); Stanford University (MBA)
- Spouse: Elena Molokova
- Children: 3
- Father: Felix Browder
- Relatives: Earl Browder (grandfather); William Browder (uncle); Andrew Browder (uncle); Joshua Browder (son)

Sir William Felix Browder, KCMG (born 23 April 1964) is an American-born British financier and political activist. He is the CEO and co-founder of Hermitage Capital Management, the investment advisor to the Hermitage Fund, which was formerly the largest foreign portfolio investor in Russia. The Hermitage Fund was founded in partnership with Republic National Bank, with $25 million in seed capital. The fund, and associated accounts, eventually grew to $4.5 billion of assets under management. In 1997, the Hermitage Fund was the best-performing fund in the world, up by 238%. Browder's primary investment strategy was shareholder rights activism. Browder took on large Russian companies, such as Gazprom, Surgutneftegaz, Unified Energy Systems, and Sidanco. In retaliation, on 13 November 2005, Browder was refused entry to Russia, deported to the United Kingdom, and declared a threat to Russian national security.

In June 2007, the Moscow offices of Hermitage Capital and of Browder's American law firm, Firestone Duncan, were raided by Russia's Interior Ministry. The corporate registration documents for Hermitage's investment holding companies were seized. Browder assigned Sergei Magnitsky, head of the tax practice at Firestone Duncan, to investigate the purpose of the raid. Magnitsky discovered that while those documents were in the custody of the police, they had been used to fraudulently re-register Hermitage's holding companies to the name of an ex-convict. Magnitsky was subsequently arrested by Russian authorities and died in prison.

The reregistration of the Hermitage holding companies was an intermediate step before the perpetrators used those companies to apply for a fraudulent $230 million (~$344 million in 2025) tax refund, awarded on 24 December 2007.

After Magnitsky's death, Browder lobbied for Congress to pass the Magnitsky Act, a law to punish Russian human rights violators, which was signed into law in 2012 by President Barack Obama. In 2013, both Magnitsky and Browder were tried in absentia in Russia for tax fraud. Both men—Magnitsky had died four years prior—were convicted and sentenced to imprisonment. Interpol rejected Russian requests to arrest Browder, saying the case was political. In 2014, the European Parliament voted for sanctions against 32 Russians believed complicit in the Magnitsky case; this was the first time it had taken such action.

On 21 October 2017, the Russian government attempted to place Browder on Interpol's arrest list of criminal fugitives, the fifth such request, which Interpol rejected on 26 October 2017. After the initial request, Browder's visa waiver for the United States was automatically suspended. After a bipartisan protest by U.S. Congressional leaders, his visa waiver was restored the following day. While visiting Spain in May 2018, Browder was arrested by Spanish authorities on a new Russian Interpol warrant and transferred to an undisclosed Spanish police station. He was released two hours later, after Interpol confirmed it was a political case.

In June 2026, Bill's son Alexander Browder, aged 17, was also sanctioned by the Russian government after exposing a Kremlin-backed money laundering network used to help fund Vladimir Putin's war in Ukraine.

== Early life and education ==
William Felix Browder was born in Princeton, New Jersey, and he grew up in Chicago, Illinois. He is the son of mathematician Felix Browder, and the grandson of communist leader Earl Browder. He attended the University of Colorado, Boulder, before transferring to the University of Chicago, from which he graduated with a degree in economics. He earned an MBA from the Stanford Graduate School of Business in 1989 and entered the financial sector.

== Family background ==
Browder's paternal grandfather, Earl Browder, was born in Kansas in 1891. He was a radical and had lived in the Soviet Union for several years from 1927 and married Raisa Berkman, a Jewish Russian woman, while living there. After his return to the U.S. in 1931, Earl Browder became the leader of the Communist Party USA from 1930 to 1945 and ran for U.S. president in 1936 and 1940. After World War II, Browder lost favour with Moscow and was expelled from the U.S. Communist Party.

Earl and his wife Raisa had three children, all sons, and all three became mathematicians who headed the mathematics departments of top American universities, including Bill Browder's father, Felix Browder, who married Eva (Tislowitz). Felix was a mathematics prodigy who had entered MIT at 16, acquired his bachelor's degree in two years, and by the age of 20 received a Ph.D. from Princeton. Despite his intellectual and academic pedigree, Felix could not find academic work during the McCarthy era, as he was the son of the onetime head of the Communist Party USA. After a series of job rejections in the 1950s, he was championed by Eleanor Roosevelt, the former First Lady who was then chairman of the board of Brandeis University; she overrode the rest of the board who were afraid to hire him, and he gained a position at Brandeis. Felix went on to chair the mathematics department at the University of Chicago, and in 1999 became the president of the American Mathematical Society.

Felix Browder was renowned in the field of nonlinear functional analysis—a branch of mathematics with wide applications to such fields as physics, engineering, and finance. He was instrumental in establishing a science and technology center in conjunction with Princeton University and Bell Labs. In 1999, he was awarded the National Medal of Science by President Bill Clinton, for his "key role in the explosive growth of nonlinear functional analysis and its applications to partial differential equations in recent years".

Bill Browder has one sibling, Tom Browder, who entered the University of Chicago at 15, and became a particle physicist. Bill Browder's son Joshua is the founder of DoNotPay, a startup that helps to automate certain legal services; another son, Alexander Browder, is a financial crime researcher.

== Career and citizenship ==
Browder started his career in the Eastern European practice of the Boston Consulting Group in London, then worked for Robert Maxwell's Maxwell Communication Corporation, and after that managed the Russian proprietary investments desk at Salomon Brothers.

In 1998, Browder became a British citizen and relinquished his U.S. citizenship. He cited that he did so because of "a legacy of bad feeling about the rule of law" as a result of his family having been "viciously persecuted" by U.S. authorities in the 1950s, citing especially his communist grandfather, Earl Browder, who was imprisoned twice during the era of McCarthyism.

=== Hermitage Capital Management ===
Browder and Edmond Safra (1932–1999) founded Hermitage Capital Management in 1996 for the purpose of investing initial seed capital of $25 million in Russia during the period of the mass privatisation after the fall of the Soviet Union. Beny Steinmetz was another of the original investors in Hermitage.

After the 1998 Russian financial crisis, Browder remained committed to Hermitage's original mission of investing in Russia, despite significant outflows from the fund. Hermitage became a prominent activist shareholder in the Russian gas giant Gazprom, the large oil company Surgutneftegas, RAO UES, Sberbank, Sidanco, Avisma, and Volzhanka. Browder exposed management corruption and corporate malfeasance in these partly state-owned companies. He has been quoted as saying: "You had to become a shareholder activist if you didn't want everything stolen from you".

In 1999, Avisma filed a RICO lawsuit against Browder and other Avisma investors, including Kenneth Dart, alleging they illegally siphoned company assets into offshore accounts and then transferred the funds to U.S. accounts at Barclays. Browder and his co-defendants settled with Avisma in 2000; they sold their Avisma shares as part of the confidential settlement agreement.

From 1995 to 2006, Hermitage Capital Management was one of the largest foreign investors in Russia, and Browder amassed millions through his management of the fund. In both 2006 and 2007, he earned an estimated £125–£150 million.

In March 2013, HSBC, a bank that serves as the trustee and manager of Hermitage Capital Management, announced it would end the fund's operations in Russia. The decision was taken amid two legal cases against Browder: a libel court case in London and a trial in absentia for tax evasion in Moscow.

In June 2018, HSBC reached a settlement with the Russian government to pay a £17 million fine to Russian authorities for its part in alleged tax avoidance.

=== Conflict with Russian government ===
In 2005, after 10 years of business deals in Russia, Browder was blacklisted by the Russian government as a "threat to national security" and denied entry to the country. The Economist wrote that the Russian government blacklisted Browder because he interfered with the flow of money to "corrupt bureaucrats and their businessmen accomplices". Browder had earlier supported Russian president Vladimir Putin.

As reported in 2008 by The New York Times, "over the next two years (according to Browder) several of his associates and lawyers, as well as their relatives, became victims of crimes, including severe beatings and robberies during which documents were taken". In June 2007, dozens of police officers "swooped down on the Moscow offices of Hermitage and its law firm, confiscating documents and computers. When a member of the firm protested that the search was illegal, he was beaten by officers and hospitalized for two weeks," said the firm's head, Jamison R. Firestone. Hermitage became "victim of what is known in Russia as 'corporate raiding': seizing companies and other assets with the aid of corrupt law enforcement officials and judges". Three Hermitage holding companies were seized on what the company's lawyers insist were bogus charges.

The raids in June 2007 enabled corrupt law enforcement officers to steal the corporate registration documents of three Hermitage holding companies. They perpetrated a fraud, claiming (and receiving) a rebate of $230 million (~$353 million in 2025) in taxes paid by those companies to the Russian state in 2006. In November 2008, one of Hermitage's auditors, Sergei Magnitsky, was arrested. He was "charged with two counts of aggravated tax evasion committed in conspiracy with Mr. Browder in respect of Dalnyaya Step and Saturn" (ECHR § 35). Magnitsky died on 16 November 2009, in prison, after 11 months in pretrial detention, nearly the limit allowed under the law.

On 27 August 2019, the European Court for Human Rights, in judging a case brought against Russia by the Magnitsky family, ruled that Magnitsky was detained in conditions which amounted to "inhuman and degrading treatment in breach of Article 3 of the Convention" (§ 193). This, combined with negligence, lack of adequate medical care, and ill-treatment also amounted to a breach of the convention (§ 240). Magnitsky's family was awarded €34,000.

As a result of the controversy related to his arrest and evidence of mistreatment and claimed abuse, his death aroused international coverage and outrage. Magnitsky's death was the catalyst for passage by the U.S. Congress, of the Magnitsky Act, signed into law by President Barack Obama on 14 December 2012. The act directly targeted individuals involved in the Magnitsky affair by prohibiting their entrance to the U.S. and their use of its banking system.

In February 2013, Russian officials announced that Browder and Magnitsky would both be tried for evading $16.8 million (~$22.9 million in 2025) in taxes. In March 2013, Russian authorities announced they would be investigating Hermitage's acquisition of Gazprom shares worth $70 million (~$95.3 million in 2025). The investigation was to focus on whether Browder violated any Russian laws when Hermitage used Russian companies registered in the region of Kalmykia to buy shares. An investigation by the Council of Europe's Committee on Legal Affairs and Human Rights cleared Browder of the accusations of improprieties that surfaced at this time. Browder was also charged with trying to gain access to Gazprom's financial reports.

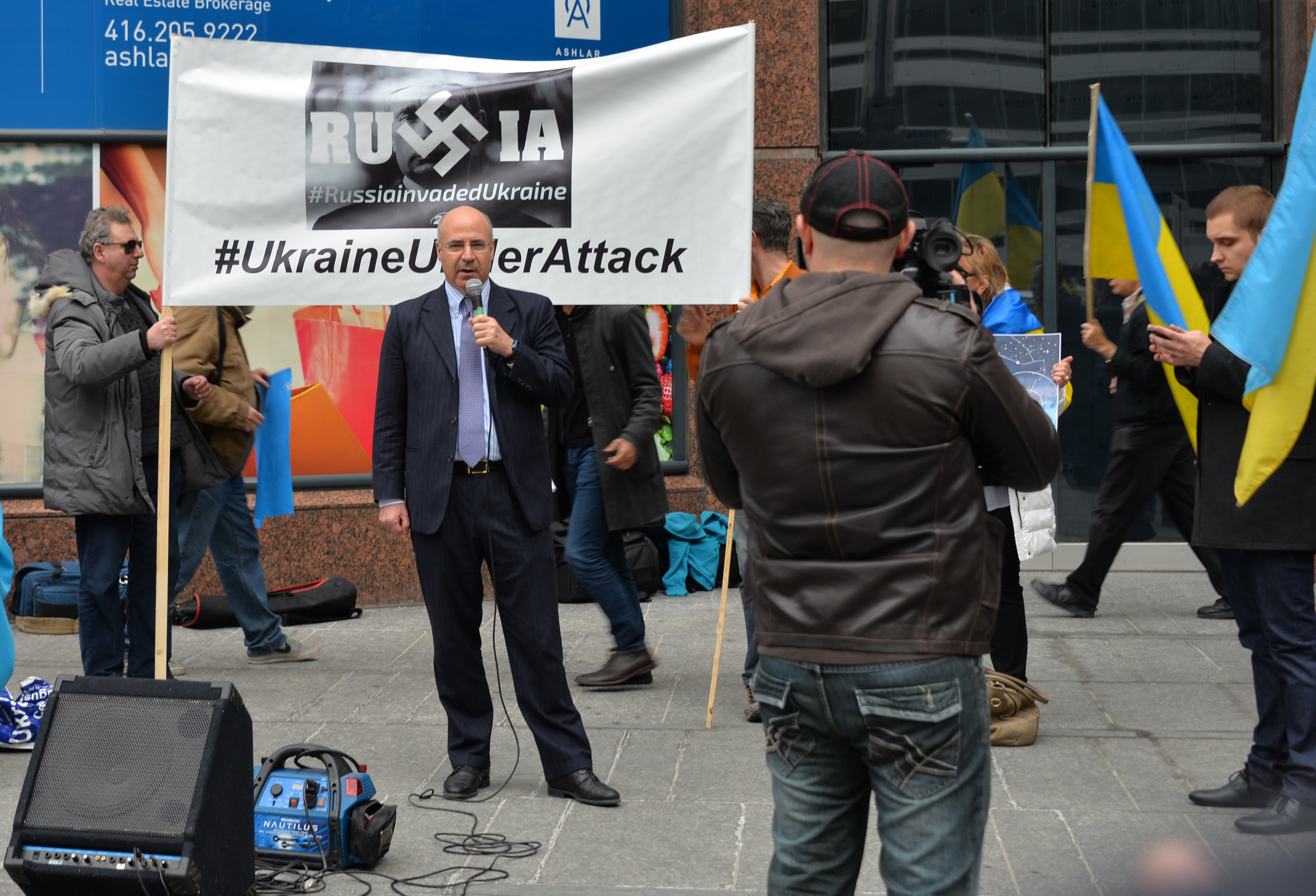
Browder speaks to the protesters in front of the Russian consulate in Toronto in March 2016

Browder admitted to having sought influence in Gazprom, but denied any wrongdoing. He said that purchasing Gazprom shares was an investment in the Russian economy, and the desire to influence the Gazprom management was driven by the need to expose a "huge fraud going on at the company". However, at the time it was illegal for foreigners to buy Gazprom shares in Russia, and he did it through shell companies that hid his ownership. He also said the scheme of using Russian-registered subsidiaries entitled to tax advantages was practised by other foreign investors at the time and was not illegal. He also said he believed the trial was a response to the U.S. passing the Magnitsky Act, which had blacklisted Russian officials involved in Magnitsky's death, preventing them from entering the U.S. The Financial Times reported that this trial was the first in Russian history that included a dead defendant.

Amnesty International described the trial as "a whole new chapter in Russia's worsening human rights record" and a "sinister attempt to deflect attention from those who committed the crimes Magnitsky exposed".

On 11 July 2013, Browder was convicted in absentia by a district criminal court in Moscow on charges under article 199 of the RF Criminal Code (tax-evasion by organisations), and sentenced to nine years. Magnitsky, according to Browder, was posthumously convicted of fraud. In May 2013 and again in July 2013, Interpol rejected requests by Russia's Interior Ministry to put Browder on its search list and locate and arrest him, saying that Russia's case against him was "predominantly political".

In April 2014, the European Parliament unanimously passed a resolution to impose sanctions on more than 30 Russians complicit in the Magnitsky case; the first time in the parliament's history that a vote was held to establish a public sanctions list. However, the vote was only advisory to the European Commission, which did not act on it.

In December 2017, Browder was tried in absentia and convicted of tax evasion and deliberate bankruptcy by a Russian court, receiving a sentence of nine years of imprisonment.

On 30 May 2018, Browder was arrested by Spanish police in Madrid on a Russian Interpol arrest warrant. He was freed soon after when the General Secretary of Interpol warned the Spanish police not to follow the Russian arrest warrant. Browder had come to Spain to brief anti-mafia prosecutor José Grinda. After briefing him, Browder returned to the United Kingdom later that evening.

In November 2018, Russian prosecutors announced new charges against Browder, accusing him of organising a "transnational criminal group" and claimed he may have poisoned Sergei Magnitsky.

External videos
- Browder's testimony on the Foreign Agents Registration Act before the Senate Judiciary Committee, July 27, 2017, C-SPAN

At the World Economic Forum (WEF) in Davos in May 2022, Browder criticised Germany for its earlier Russia course: "Putin is 95 percent to blame for this war, because he is the one who throws the bombs and murders civilians" but "the West is also responsible for five percent and especially Germany to blame for what is happening in Ukraine," Browder told the media. "Merkel fought hard to make Germany and Europe dependent on Moscow and open to blackmail. Putin's attack on Ukraine is therefore also Merkel's war!", said Browder.

Browder has also strongly criticized Switzerland and the role Swiss banks played in allegedly aiding the financing of Russia's invasion. Browder called on Switzerland to adopt its own sanctions against Russia and not just those proposed by the European Union (EU), as it had been doing. Browder also accused the Swiss justice system of being “incapable of dealing with money laundering” after Switzerland’s decision to return $15.9 million to three Russian individuals sanctioned in the U.S. and other Western countries. Switzerland's Department for Foreign Affairs rejected the accusations, stating that "claims that Switzerland is doing less than other countries and that it is still harbouring funds from sanctioned individuals without freezing them are unfounded".

In July 2023, through Browder's initiative, the Magnitsky Act, the U.S. Helsinki Commission sanctioned three Swiss citizens, including former Swiss attorney, Michael Lauber.

In October 2025, after the Trump administration imposed sanctions on Russian oil companies Rosneft and Lukoil, Browder said: "This won’t seriously deprive Putin of his war dollars unless we sanction the eight refineries that buy the oil in China, India."

In January 2026, Browder again attended the WEF in Davos. There, he urged chief executives, European leaders, and U.S. senators to impose more financial pain on Putin by sanctioning refineries that buy Russian crude oil, arguing that Putin's fate depends on the war with Ukraine. Browder said, "... [Putin] needs to be at war so that there’s a foreign enemy and not people getting angry with him for a lousy life that he’s created for most Russian people. And so if he were to stop the war, he would lose power."

=== 2017 testimony to the U.S. Senate Judiciary Committee ===
On 27 July 2017, Browder testified to the U.S. Senate Judiciary Committee on Russia's alleged interference in the 2016 U.S. presidential election in regards to the Foreign Agents Registration Act (FARA) and Fusion GPS. The latter is the opposition research firm based in Washington D.C. that commissioned former MI6 staffer Christopher Steele to collect information on Donald Trump's ties with Russia. The hearing was set up to examine the firm's separate work on a legal case involving the Magnitsky Act. He directly discussed the President of Russia Vladimir Putin. Browder testified that President Putin is "the biggest oligarch in Russia and the richest man in the world", building a fortune by threatening Russian oligarchs and getting a 50% cut of their profits:

"I estimate that he has accumulated $200 billion of ill-gotten gains from these types of operations over his 17 years in power. He keeps his money in the West and all of his money in the West is potentially exposed to asset freezes and confiscation. Therefore, he has a significant and very personal interest in finding a way to get rid of the Magnitsky sanctions."

Browder concluded his statement by reviewing the circumstances that led to the U.S.'s passage of the Magnitsky Act:

"I hope that my story will help you understand the methods of Russian operatives in Washington and how they use U.S. enablers to achieve major foreign policy goals without disclosing those interests. I also hope that this story and others like it may lead to a change in the FARA enforcement regime in the future."

=== Books about experiences in Russia ===
In February 2015, Browder published a book about his career, Red Notice: A True Story of High Finance, Murder, and One Man's Fight for Justice, focusing on his years spent in Russia and the Russian government's attacks on Hermitage Capital Management. Browder's responses to Russian corruption and his support of the investigation into the death of his attorney Sergei Magnitsky are at the heart of the book. In 2015, a film adaptation written by William Nicholson was reportedly in the works. In 2022, it was reported that director Doug Liman had signed on to helm an eight-part series adaptation of Browder’s book.

A new book by Browder was published on 12 April 2022: Freezing Order: A True Story of Money Laundering, Murder and Surviving Vladimir Putin's Wrath.

=== Prevezon civil asset forfeiture case ===
In 2013, the U.S. Attorney's Office for New York's Southern District filed a civil asset forfeiture case against Prevezon Holdings Limited, a real estate holding company belonging to Russian businessman Denis Katsyv, based on information from Browder. Prevezon and the Department of Justice settled the case in May 2017 for $5.9 million (~$7.61 million in 2025). Pursuant to a subpoena, Browder gave deposition testimony in the case.

=== Awards and recognition ===
Browder has been the recipient of dozens of awards and recognitions. Some of the most significant are listed below.

In 2017, GQ magazine named Browder one of its Men of the Year for standing up to Vladimir Putin.

In 2018, Browder was named the 67th most powerful person in the world by Worth magazine. The magazine noted, "Browder has become one of the biggest thorns in Putin's side—and appears to be a key reason Russia interfered in the 2016 U.S. presidential election."

Browder's interview with Preet Bharara on the Stay Tuned with Preet podcast received the People's Choice Webby Award for Best Individual Podcast.

In 2018, Browder received the Aspen Institute Henry Crown Leadership Award, a prize honouring "an outstanding leader whose achievements reflect the high standards of honor, integrity, industry, and philanthropy."

In October 2018, Browder received the Coalition for Integrity's Integrity Award for "his courageous fight to expose state-sponsored corruption and shine a light on individuals whose wealth is built on wrongdoing, so that they are denied safe havens anywhere in the world."

In June 2019, Browder was presented with the American Spirit Award for Citizen Activism at The Common Good Forum & American Spirit Awards. The committee noted Browder's "relentless fight against human rights abuses, corruption, and his work spearheading the Magnitsky Act."

In September 2019, Browder received the Trinity College (Dublin) SMF award for outstanding contributions to finance.

In 2019, Browder received the Lantos Human Rights Prize from the Lantos Foundation for his work as the "driving force behind the Magnitsky Sanctions, the most consequential enforcement mechanism of the modern human rights movement."

In the 2024 King's Birthday Honours (on 14 June 2024), he was appointed Knight Commander of the Order of St Michael and St George (KCMG) "for services to human rights, anti-corruption, and international affairs".

In May 2024, he received the honorary degree doctor of letters from Colgate University and delivered the commencement address, urging the graduates to "surround yourself with people, friends, and loved ones who share your values and visions."

== Counterclaims ==
=== Andrei Nekrasov documentary ===
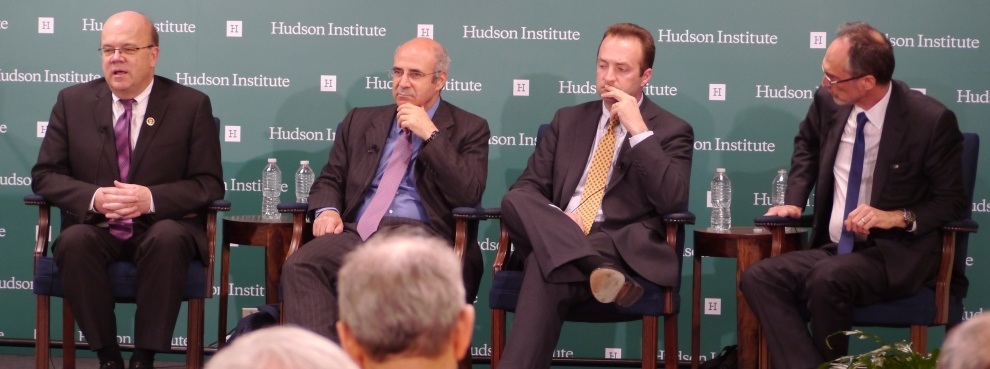
Browder and others at a 2015 talk hosted by the Hudson Institute

A film by Andrei Nekrasov, The Magnitsky Act – Behind the Scenes (2016), available on YouTube, according to The Daily Beast, "absolves the Russian government of any responsibility for Magnitsky's death" and claims that Browder was behind the $230-million tax-rebate fraud. The Washington Post commented in an editorial: "The film is a piece of agitprop that mixes fact and fiction to blame Magnitsky for the fraud and absolve Russians of blame for his death."

Several of the key figures interviewed in the movie have declared it mendacious. The Washington Post described it as part of "a campaign to discredit Mr. Browder and the Magnitsky Act".

Some European theatre screenings and a television broadcast of the film were cancelled after threats of libel suits from Browder. According to Browder's 2017 testimony to the U.S. Senate Judiciary Committee, Russian lawyer Natalia Veselnitskaya hired a former Wall Street Journal reporter, Chris Cooper of the Potomac Group, to organise its US premiere. Over Browder's objections, the Newseum in Washington, D.C. held a screening in June 2016 hosted by Seymour Hersh. Dana Rohrabacher (R-CA)'s office actively promoted the screening, sending out invitations from the office of the House Foreign Affairs Subcommittee on Europe, Eurasia and Emerging Threats, which Rohrabacher chaired at the time; he was described by The Daily Beast as "a long-standing Russia ally".

=== Vladimir Putin statement in Helsinki ===
On 16 July 2018, during a joint press conference with President Donald Trump in Helsinki, Finland, Vladimir Putin stated that Browder had funnelled $400 million to Hillary Clinton's 2016 presidential campaign, an effort that he claimed involved members of the U.S. intelligence community who, Putin said, "accompanied and guided these transactions." The statement was made after Putin said he would allow special counsel Robert Mueller's team to come to Russia for their investigation—as long as there was a reciprocal arrangement for Russian intelligence to investigate in the U.S.

Putin said:

"Business associates of Mr. Browder have earned over $1.5 billion in Russia and never paid any taxes neither in Russia nor the United States and yet the money escaped the country. They were transferred to the United States. They sent [a] huge amount of money, $400,000,000, as a contribution to the campaign of Hillary Clinton. (Later, the Russian Prosecutor General's Office spokesman Alexander Kurennoy clarified that it was not $400 million, but rather $400,000.) Well that's their personal case. It might have been legal, the contribution itself but the way the money was earned was illegal. So we have solid reason to believe that some [US] intelligence officers accompanied and guided these transactions. So we have an interest in questioning them."

The Washington Post and The New York Times rated Putin's claim about the funding "false," noting that there was no evidence to substantiate it. Politifact gave it a "pants on fire" rating. Browder, in his own article for Time, called the accusation "so ludicrous and untrue that it falls into delusion." He maintains that Putin continues to make false allegations against him in response to Browder's involvement with the Magnitsky Act. Browder also says that he is a British citizen and no longer American, therefore Trump would be unable to respond to Putin's request.

=== Der Spiegel articles ===
On 22 November 2019, German news magazine Der Spiegel published an article in which it claimed Browder's accusations concerning the "Magnitsky Case" do not withstand thorough examination. The English version appeared on 26 November 2019. After Browder filed a complaint about this article with the chief editorship of Der Spiegel and the German Press Council, Der Spiegel published a further article, releasing its evidence and emphasising its stance on the matter.

== Published works ==
- Browder, Bill (2015). Red Notice: How I became Putin's No. 1 Enemy. London: Corgi/Penguin Random House/Transworld. ISBN 9780552170321.
- Browder, Bill (2015). Red Notice: How I Became Putin's No. 1 Enemy. Bantam Press. ISBN 978-0593072950.
- Browder, Bill (2015). Red Notice: A True Story of High Finance, Murder, and One Man's Fight for Justice (Reprint ed.). Simon & Schuster. ISBN 978-1-4767-5574-8.
- Browder, Bill (2022). Freezing Order: A True Story of Money Laundering, Murder and Surviving Vladimir Putin's Wrath. Simon & Schuster. ISBN 978-1982153281.
