= Denis Katsyv =

Businessman based in Moscow

- Денис Кацыв
- Born: 1977 (age 48–49)

Denis Katsyv (Russian: Денис Кацыв) is a Ukrainian, Russian and Israeli businessman based in Moscow and owner of Prevezon Holdings Limited. He was linked in a civil forfeiture case to money laundering through real estate investments in the United States, in violation of the Magnitsky Act of 2012; the case was settled in 2017 with the United States Justice Department by Prevezon agreeing to pay $5.9 million.

The Parties agree that the Complaints do not allege that any of the Defendants, Claimants, or Denis Katsyv, Alexander Litvak, or Timofey Krit, is responsible, directly or indirectly, for the arrest, detention, or death of Sergei Magnitsky, or that they have acted as an agent of, on behalf of or in agreement with a person in a matter relating to the arrest, detention, or death of Sergei Magnitsky.

Katsyv was represented by attorney Natalia Veselnitskaya, (Note: Nataliya Vesilnitskaya became an attorney in 2009. In 2012, Vesilnitskaya's then husband Alexander Mitusov was a deputy prosecutor for the Moscow Region and later became an assistant to Katsyv's father Petr Katsyv while Petr headed the main department for the Moscow Region.) who met with Fusion GPS co-founder Glenn R. Simpson who was investigating American-British financier Bill Browder for Katsyv, as well as with Donald Trump Jr. in the summer of 2016, during the U.S. presidential campaign of the latter's father, Donald Trump.

== Background ==
Katsyv is the son of Pyotr Dmitriyevich Katsyv, who was the Minister of Transport for the Moscow region from 2000 to 2012, (Note: During this period, Grigory Luchansky, who founded the Vienna, Austria, based firm Nordex (Russian: «Нордекс») and was the beneficial owner of the firm ZiL until 2012 when the Andrey Molchanov's LSR Group obtained the site and allegedly Donald Trump would build his Trump Tower Moscow on property that Molchanov beneficially owns "that could work for the tower", provided large amounts of funding for the Moscow transport complex.) head of the main department for the Moscow region under Andrei Vorobyov from 2012 to 2013, and vice president of Russian Railways from October 2014 to February 2019. He was educated and took advantage of business opportunities as Russia began to privatize.

Early in the 2000s, Denis Katsyv participated in a scheme that, according to Israeli authorities in 2005, was a money laundering scheme involving millions of dollars among three companies, Follet, Hanway and Bastet, and the Israeli Bank Hapoalim. Martash Investments Ltd., which is a British Virgin Islands company owned by Alexander Litvak and Denis Katsyv and has bank accounts at UBS Bank in Switzerland and at Bank Hapoalim branch 535 in Israel, was a defendant in a money laundering case that paid ₪35 million to have the matter resolved. (Note: During 2004–05, employees, managers, and customers of the Bank Hapoalim branch 535 were investigated by Yoav Lehman of the Supervisor of Banks in the Bank of Israel, the Israel Anti Money Laundering Authority, and Brigadier General Amichai Shai of the National Serious and International Crimes Unit of the Investigations Division.)

On August 12, 2012, Novaya Gazeta, Barron's, and the International Center for the Study of Corruption and Organized Crime (OCCRP) published articles detailing that Denis Katsyv had become the sole shareholder of Cyprus-based Prevezon Holdings Ltd. shortly after it received mysterious cash payments to its Swiss UBS bank accounts over two weeks in February 2008 from the two Moldovan companies Bunicon Impex and Elenast using the Alfa Bank hosted correspondent account for the Russian Bank Krainiy Sever. (Note: During the scheme, the Krainiy Sever account with Alfa Bank served as a currency converter to transition from the Russian accounts to the overseas accounts.) Over $52 million was moved through Bunicon-Impex SRL and Elenast-Com SRL bank accounts throughout the 2008 winter with over $850,000 transferred to Prevezon Holdings' Swiss accounts on February 8 and 13, 2008. At that time, Katsyv's business partner Litvak was an owner of the Prevezon Cyprus properties in New York and had interests with Prevezon Berlin GmbH in Germany. During 2008, Prevezon and its business partner Africa Israel Investments (AFI), owned by Lev Leviev conducted several joint ventures in the United States and Europe. Some of the financing for Prevezon and its partner came from Deutsche Bank. In 2013, Bill Browder insisted that Prevezon had received over $1.9 million through his stolen Hermitage Capital Management companies to purchase New York properties. During 2013, Preet Bharara, prosecuting attorney for the Southern District of New York, seized four luxury apartments, two commercial properties and froze the assets of eleven firms including Prevezon Ltd.

In May 2017, Prezevon, represented by Louis Freeh, settled a case brought by the U.S Department of Justice for $5.9 million in fines. (Note: Prevezon's attorney Louis Freeh was Director of the FBI from September 1, 1993, until June 25, 2001. In May 2018, Freeh purchased a $9.38 million home from Armen A. Manoogian in Palm Beach, Florida, near Mar-a-Lago where Freeh often attends events.) It was related to Russian tax fraud and money laundering originally uncovered by the late Russian lawyer and auditor Sergei Magnitsky. Katsyv was represented by attorney Natalia Veselnitskaya and the law firm BakerHostetler in cooperation with research firm Fusion GPS, which was concurrently assembling opposition research against candidate Trump. In November 2017, Katsyv's company Prevezon stated that it would pay the fine using money from AFI Europe, which is a subsidiary of Lev Leviev's Africa Israel Investments.

He provided financial support to the Human Rights Accountability Global Initiative, a lobbying agent against the Magnitsky Act that was co-founded by Nataliya Veselnitskaya in February 2015 in Delaware. Denis Katsyv was specifically named in testimony by American-British financier Bill Browder to the United States Senate Judiciary Committee of the 115th Congress on July 27, 2017, in regards to the Magnitsky Act. Under the Magnitsky Act (Note: On December 12, 2012, the Magnitsky Act became United States law.) after the Magnitsky list was published in April 2013. According to Alexei Navalny, the apartments, which were purchased by Prevezon Holdings in December 2009, were in the 20 Pine Street building, which is not far from Wall Street in the New York City Financial District, and is the same building that contains several apartments which were purchased within 3 weeks of the Prevezon Holdings purchases and had as beneficial owner Alexander Udodov, whose wife is the sister of Mikhail Mishustin. (Note: Alexander Udodov relinquished control of his apartments in the 20 Pine Street building in 2018 and divorced from Mikhail Mishustin's sister Natalya Stenina on December 18, 2020.) (Note: Mishustin was the head of Russia's tax service from April 6, 2010, until January 16, 2020, when he became Russia's prime minister.)

== See also ==
- Timeline of Russian interference in the 2016 United States elections
- Timeline of investigations into Trump and Russia (2019–2020)
