= Piraya Film =

Norwegian documentary film production company

Piraya Film is an independent production company based in Stavanger, Norway, known for making documentary films, often on international subjects. The company was founded in 1999 by filmmakers Torstein Grude and Trond Kvist with the aim of making creative high end documentaries for release in the market worldwide.

== Funding ==
The production house has received funding for several projects from Filmkraft Rogaland, a Norwegian regional film center and FilmReg member.

== Awards ==
Piraya (and/or its founders) has been nominated for multiple producer Oscars and Emmies, and have won several awards at film festivals worldwide.

The company has been commended for producing films focused on unconventional and dangerous territories, such as Sergei Magnitsky’s death, a decade-long sting operation in North Korea, Indonesian mass killings, and Russian-Georgian war.

Piraya was recognized with Fritt Ord Foundation's Tribute.

== Productions ==
The company has produced 40+ films, which have received broad recognition and many nominations and awards. including multiple Oscar and Emmy nominations and Sundance wins.

Piraya Film is regularly involved in international co-productions.

List of productions
Title	Director	Awards	Nominations	Other film festivals
Junkies (1998)	Trond Kvist			
Straight to Heaven (2000)	Anneli Hansen			
Street Level (2000)	Anneli Hansen			
Instant Happiness (2001)	Torstein Grude			
Slaves of SMS (2002)	Lars Leegaard Marøy			
Welcome Home (2002)	Trond Kvist			
Heaven Inside Us (2004)	Torstein Grude, Ina Roll Spinnangr			
Tin Soldiers (2004)	Torstein Grude, Stian Indrevoll	Best Editing, 2005 Madrid International Documentary Film Festival	Audience Award, 2004 Amsterdam International Documentary Film Festival	
The Con Kid (2005)	Trond Kvist		Best Documentary, 2005 Amanda Awards, Norway	
Rebel Kingdom (2006)	Berit Rødstøl			
Scientific Poetry (2006)	Bjarte Mørner Tveit			
On a Tightrope (2007)	Petr Lom			
Hypochondriacs (2007)	Lars Leegaard Marøy			
Belarusian Waltz (2007)	Andrzej Fidyk			
Yodok Stories (2008)	Andrzej Fidyk			
Discoveries of a Marionette (2009)	Bjarte Mørner Tveit			
Russian Lessons (2010)	Olga Konskaya, Andrey Nekrasov		Best Documentary, 2010 Amanda Awards, Norway; Amnesty Award, 2010 CPH:DOX; World Cinema - Documentary, 2010 Sundance Film Festival	
Pushwagner (2011)	Even Benestad, August Baugstø Hanssen	Best Visual Effects, 2012 Amanda Awards, Norway	Best Film, 2012 Amanda Awards, Norway; Best Editing, 2012 Amanda Awards, Norway; Best Score, 2012 Amanda Awards, Norway; Nordic Dox Award, 2012 CPH:DOX; Best Music, 2012 HARPA Nordic Film Composers Award; Best Editing, 2012 Kosmorama, Trondheim Internasjonale Filmfestival; Best Innovation, 2012 Kosmorama, Trondheim Internasjonale Filmfestival	
Farewell Comrades! (2011)	Tatiana Nekrasov	Documentary/Cultural, 2013 Adolf Grimme Awards, Germany		
Mit Afghanistan: Livet i den forbudte zone (2012)	Nagieb Khaja	Human Rights Award, 2013 Buenos Aires International Festival of Independent Cinema	Breakthrough, 2013 AFI Fest; Nordic Dox Award, 2012 CPH:DOX; Politiken's Audience Award, 2012 CPH:DOX; Best Film - Documentary, 2012 Dubai International Film Festival; Best Nordic Documentary, 2013 Göteborg Film Festival	
Dance of Outlaws (2012)	Mohamed El Aboudi	Zonta Club Locarno Award, 2012 Locarno International Film Festival; Finnish Short Film Over 30 Minutes, 2013 Tampere International Short Film Festival	Nordic Dox Award, 2012 CPH:DOX; Best Film - Documentary, 2012 Dubai International Film Festival; Critics Week Award, 2012 Locarno International Film Festival; Viktor Award, 2014 Munich International Documentary Festival (DOK.fest)	
Back to the Square (2012)	Petr Lom	Jury Prize, 2012 Hong Kong International Film Festival; Grand Jury Award, 2012 Guam International Film Festival	Golden Firebird Award, 2012 Hong Kong International Film Festival	
The Act of Killing (2012)	Joshua Oppenheimer, Christine Cynn	List of accolades received by The Act of Killing, including Oscar nomination	Oscar	
Gulabi Gang (2012)	Nishtha Jain	(Indian) National Film Award for Best Film on Social Issues, Documentary, 2014 Aljazeera International Documentary Film Festival; Best Film - Documentary, 2012 Dubai International Film Festival; Best Documentary, 2014 New York Indo-American Arts Council Film Festival; Best Documentary, 2012 Norwegian Short Film Festival; Documentary, 2013 Tri Continental Film Festival	Viktor Award, 2013 Munich International Documentary Festival (DOK.fest); Golden Firebird Award, 2013 Hong Kong International Film Festival	
TPB AFK: The Pirate Bay Away from Keyboard (2013)	Simon Klose			63rd Berlin International Film Festival
Love City, Jalalabad (2013)	George Gittoes, Torstein Grude	Best Documentary, 2015 Winter Film Awards; Socially Relevant Film, 2015 Winter Film Awards	Best Documentary, 2014 Amanda Awards, Norway	
Pels (2014)	Ola Waagen	Most significant Norwegian documentary	Best Documentary, 2015 Amanda Awards, Norway	
The Look of Silence (2014)	Joshua Oppenheimer	Audience Award, 2015 Angers European First Film Festival; Grand Jury Prize, 2015 Angers European First Film Festival; Best Documentary, 2015 Austin Film Critics Association; Peace Film Award, 2015 Berlin International Film Festival; Best Documentary, 2015 Bodil Awards; Best Foreign Language Film, 2015 Boston Society of Film Critics Awards; Best Documentary Feature, 2015 Calgary Underground Film Festival; Golden Frog, 2015 Camerimage; Best Documentary, 2016 Central Ohio Film Critics Association; The Unforgettables, 2016 Cinema Eye Honors Awards; Outstanding Achievement in Nonfiction Feature Filmmaking, 2016 Cinema Eye Honors Awards; Outstanding Achievement in Direction, 2016 Cinema Eye Honors Awards; Outstanding Achievement in Production, 2016 Cinema Eye Honors Awards; CPH:DOX Award, 2014 CPH:DOX Award; Best Long Documentary, 2015 Danish Film Awards; Best Documentary Film, 2016 Denver Film Critics Society; Best Documentary, 2014 Denver International Film Festival; Audience Award, 2015 DocsBarcelona; DocsBarcelona TV3 Award, 2015 DocsBarcelona; International Amnesty Catalunya Award, 2015 DocsBarcelona; Best Documentary, 2016 Film Independent Spirit Awards; Best Documentary, 2015 Gotham Awards; Best Nordic Documentary, 2015 Göteborg Film Festival; Best Documentary, 2015 Indiewire Critics' Poll; Best Feature, 2015 International Documentary Association; Foreign Language Film of the Year, 2016 London Critics Circle Film Awards; Documentary Jury Award, 2015 Milwaukee Film Festival; Top Five Documentaries, 2015 National Board of Review, USA; Audience Award, 2015 Nuremberg International Human Rights Film Festival; Best Documentary, 2015 Online Film Critics Society Awards; Best Non-U.S. Release, 2014 Online Film Critics Society Awards; Busan Cinephile Award, 2014 Pusan International Film Festival; Best Director: Documentary Feature, 2015 RiverRun International Film Festival; Best Motion Picture, Documentary, 2016 Satellite Awards; Best Documentary, 2016 Seattle Film Critics Awards; Audience Award, 2015 Sheffield International Documentary Festival; Best Documentary, 2015 Sofia International Film Festival; Festival Favorites, 2015 SXSW Film Festival; Allan King Documentary Award, 2015 Toronto Film Critics Association Awards; FIPRESCI Prize, 2014 Venice Film Festival; Best Euro-Mediterranean Film, 2014 Venice Film Festival; Golden Mouse, 2014 Venice Film Festival; Grand Special Jury Prize, 2014 Venice Film Festival; Human Rights Film Network Award, 2014 Venice Film Festival; Best Documentary, 2015 Village Voice Film Poll; Best Director, 2015 Vilnius International Film Festival; International Documentary Film, 2014 Zurich Film Festival	Best Documentary Feature, 2016 Oscar; Outstanding Investigative Documentary, 2017 Emmy Award; Best Documentary, 2017 Emmy Award; Best Documentary Feature, 2014 Abu Dhabi Film Festival; IDFA Audience Award, 2014 Amsterdam International Documentary Film Festival; Best Documentary Feature Film, 2015 Asia Pacific Screen Awards; Best Documentary Feature Film, 2015 Awards Circuit Community Awards; Best Documentary, 2015 Boston Society of Film Critics Awards; Best Documentary Feature, 2016 Broadcast Film Critics Association Awards; Best Foreign Language Film, 2015 Chicago Film Critics Association Awards; Best Documentary, 2015 Chicago Film Critics Association Awards; Audience Choice Award, 2014 Chicago International Film Festival; Outstanding Achievement in Cinematography, 2016 Cinema Eye Honors Awards; Greg Gund Memorial Standing Up Award, 2015 Cleveland International Film Festival; Best Documentary, 2015 Dallas-Fort Worth Film Critics Association Awards; Best Documentary, 2015 Detroit Film Critics Society Awards; Best International Film, 2015 DocAviv Film Festival; Best Documentary, 2015 Dublin Film Critics Circle Awards; European Documentary, 2015 European Film Awards; Best Documentary, 2015 Florida Film Critics Circle Awards; Best Foreign Film, 2016 Georgia Film Critics Association; Best Documentary Film, 2016 Georgia Film Critics Association; Documentary Feature, 2016 Gold Derby Awards; Audience Award, 2015 Gotham Awards; Best Documentary Feature, 2016 Houston Film Critics Society Awards; Best Film, 2015 Indiewire Critics' Poll; Best Documentary, 2016 International Cinephile Society Awards; Best Documentary, 2016 International Online Cinema Awards; Best Documentary, 2015 Kansas City Film Critics Circle Awards; Film of the Year, 2016 London Critics Circle Film Awards; Documentary of the Year, 2016 London Critics Circle Film Awards; Best Documentary/Non-Fiction Film, 2016 Los Angeles Film Critics Association Awards; Best Documentary, 2015 Melbourne International Film Festival; Audience Award, 2015 Moscow International Film Festival; Best Documentary Film, 2016 North Carolina Film Critics Association; Human Rights Film Award, 2015 Nuremberg International Human Rights Film Festival; Best Documentary Picture, 2016 Online Film & Television Association; Outstanding Producer of Documentary Theatrical Motion Pictures, 2016 PGA Awards; Best Documentary, 2015 San Francisco Film Critics Circle; Best Documentary Film, 2015 St. Louis Film Critics Association; Best Foreign Film, 2015 Turkish Film Critics Association (SIYAD) Awards; Golden Lion, 2014 Venice Film Festival; Best Documentary, 2015 Washington DC Area Film Critics Association Awards; Best International Documentary Film, 2014 Zurich Film Festival	
Snow Monkey (2015)	George Gittoes	Audience Award, 2016 Biografilm Festival	Best Feature Length Documentary, 2016 Australian Academy of Cinema and Television Arts (AACTA) Awards; Best Editing in a Documentary, Australian Academy of Cinema and Television Arts (AACTA) Awards; Best Feature Documentary, 2016 Film Critics Circle of Australia Awards; IDFA Audience Award, 2015 Amsterdam International Documentary Film Festival; Sheffield Youth Jury Award, 2016 Sheffield International Documentary Festival; Best Documentary Feature Film, 2016 Asia Pacific Screen Awards	
Digitale Dissidenten (2015)	Cyril Tuschi			
Mogadishu Soldier (2016)	Torstein Grude		F:ACT Award, 2017 CPH:DOX; Best Norwegian Documentary, 2017 Bergen International Film Festival	
Forever Pure (2016)	Maya Zinshtein	Outstanding Politics and Government Documentary, 2018 Emmy Award; Faith in Film Award, 2017 Tromsø International Film Festival; Special Jury Prize, 2017 RiverRun International Film Festival; Best Director of a Documentary, 2016 Jerusalem Film Festival; Best Editing, 2016 Jerusalem Film Festival; Best Editing, 2016 Jerusalem Film Festival; The Lia Van Leer Award, 2016 Jerusalem Film Festival	Best International Documentary Film, 2016 Zurich Film Festival; Best Documentary Feature, 2017 RiverRun International Film Festival; Best Israeli Documentary, 2016 Jerusalem Film Festival; Viewfinders Grand Jury Prize, 2016 DOC NYC; Grand Jury Prize, 2017 Dallas International Film Festival; F:ACT Award, 2017 CPH:DOX; Greg Gund Memorial Standing Up Award, 2017 Cleveland International Film Festival; Gold Hugo, 2016 Chicago International Film Festival; Best Documentary, 2017 Awards of the Israeli Film Academy	
The Magnitsky Act – Behind the Scenes (2016)	Andrei Nekrasov	Special Commendation, 2016 Moscow International Film Festival; Special Commendation, 2016 Prix Europa Berlin; Night Award, 2018 Festival Internacional Signos de la Noche (Tucumán, Argentina); The Signs Award, 16th International Festival Signs of the Night (Bangkok, Thailand)		2017 Norwegian Short Film Festival, Grimstad
Tutti a Casa - Power to the people? (2017)	Lise Birk Pedersen		Best Documentary, 2018 Bodil Awards; F:ACT Award, 2017 CPH:DOX	
Raghu Rai: An Unframed Portrait (2017)	Avani Rai	Best Soundtrack, 2018 Sole Luna Doc Film Festival		
The Great European Cigarette Mystery (2017)	Jeppe Rønde		CPH:DOX Award, 2017 CPH:DOX	
Angels Are Made Of Light (2018)	James Longley	Harrell Award, 2018 Camden International Film Festival;	Best Documentary Feature, 2018 Camden International Film Festival; Greg Gund Memorial Standing Up Award, 2019 Cleveland International Film Festival; Human Rights Competition, 2019 Istanbul International Film Festival	
The Secret Lives of Pigs (2019)	Ola Waagen			
Cold Case Hammarskjöld (2019)	Mads Brügger	Directing Award, 2019 Sundance Film Festival; Audience Award, 2019 Cinetopia Film Festival; Best Documentary Feature Film, 2019 Greenwich International Film Festival; It's All True Trophy, 2019 It's All True - International Documentary Film Festival; Jury Award, 2019 Lighthouse International Film Festival; Bydgoszcz ART.DOC Award, 2019 Millennium Docs Against Gravity; ARRI/OSRAM Award, 2019 Munich Film Festival; Best Director Award, 2019 One World International Human Rights Documentary Film Festival; Golden Butterfly, 2019 The Hague Movies that Matter Festival	European Parliament Lux Prize; Best Film Unipol Award, 2019 Biografilm Festival; Outstanding Achievement in Direction, 2019 Cinema Eye Honors Awards; Most Innovative Documentary, 2019 Critics' Choice Documentary Awards; Best Documentary, 2019 Danish Film Awards; Best Documentary, 2019 DocsBarcelona; Best Documentary Feature, 2019 Göteborg Film Festival; The Human Rights Human Wrongs Film Award, 2019 Human International Documentary Film Festival; Human Rights Film Award, 2019 International Human Rights Documentary Film Festival; Grierson Award, 2019 London Film Festival; Best Film, 2019 LUX Prize; Grand Prix Bank Millenium Award, 2019 Millennium Docs Against Gravity; Best International Film, 2019 Munich Film Festival; Best Feature Documentary, 2019 Nordic Docs; Best Documentary, 2019 Nordic Film Days Lubeck; Best Nordic Documentary, 2019 Oslo Pix; Best Documentary, 2019 Reykjavik International Film Festival; Grand Prix, 2020 Sofia International Film Festival; Grand Jury Prize, 2020 Sundance Film Festival; Golden Eye, 2019 Zurich Film Festival	
'Til Kingdom Come (2020)	Maya Zinshtein		Best Documentary, 2020 Chicago International Film Festival; Best Israeli Film, 2020 DocAviv Film Festival	
The Mole: Undercover in North Korea (2020)	Mads Brügger			
