= The End (2024 film) =

Film by Joshua Oppenheimer

- American theatrical release poster
- Directed by: Joshua Oppenheimer
- Written by: Joshua Oppenheimer; Rasmus Heisterberg
- Produced by: Joshua Oppenheimer; Tilda Swinton; Signe Byrge Sørensen
- Starring: Tilda Swinton; George MacKay; Moses Ingram; Bronagh Gallagher; Tim McInnerny; Lennie James; Michael Shannon
- Cinematography: Mikhail Krichman
- Edited by: Niels Pagh Andersen
- Music by: Joshua Schmidt; Marius de Vries
- Production companies: Neon; The Match Factory/Mubi; Final Cut for Real; The End MFP; Wild Atlantic Pictures; Dorje Film; Moonspun Films; Anagram
- Distributed by: Scandinavian Film Distribution (Denmark and Sweden); Mubi (United Kingdom, Ireland, Germany and Austria)
- Release date: 31 August 2024 (Telluride)
- Running time: 149 minutes
- Countries: Denmark; Germany; Ireland; Italy; United Kingdom; Sweden
- Language: English
- Box office: $141,660

The End is a 2024 apocalyptic musical film directed and co-written by Joshua Oppenheimer. Produced by Oppenheimer, Signe Byrge Sørensen, and star Tilda Swinton, the film also features George MacKay, Moses Ingram, Bronagh Gallagher, Tim McInnerny, Lennie James, and Michael Shannon. The story follows a wealthy family living in an underground bunker, after a global environmental disaster leaves Earth inhospitable, whose dynamics alter following the arrival of a survivor.

The End premiered at the 51st Telluride Film Festival on 31 August 2024. It was released by Neon in the United States on 6 December 2024. The film received a mixed reception from critics.

== Plot ==
Set two decades after an environmental catastrophe renders Earth's surface uninhabitable, the story centers on a wealthy family—Mother, Father, and their 20-year-old Son—who have isolated themselves in a luxurious bunker deep within a converted salt mine, along with a few other individuals: Friend, one of Mother's oldest friends; Butler, an aging queer man who serves the others; and Doctor, who provides them with medication and keeps track of safety precautions and procedures. The Son, having spent his entire life underground, yearns to experience the outside world he has never seen and build scale models of historical events and places.

The family follows a regular schedule, including safety emergency drills, fitness at an indoor pool, regular duties to keep the bunker and their small outpost running, and managing a collection of fine art Mother had brought with them. The family also decorates the bunker to evoke the changing seasons. The Mother wants everything to appear perfect, and obsesses over the details of the bunker's decor and layout. The Son is helping the Father write his memoir, while taking creative liberties around the Father's former work as an oil tycoon and describing his work as "energy sector" and describing in detail his philanthropy. The Friend describes to the Son how her son was sick with cancer and would not have survived in the bunker. The Son struggles with loneliness and longing to experience the world.

The group eventually finds a Girl unconscious in the mines and bring her in to question her about how she found them. The Girl describes the uninhabitable surface and says that her family died when they tried to cross a river, and she is alone, later reflecting on her trauma. They decide to cast her back out onto the surface, but the Girl escapes and runs through the bunker, evading them until the Son pleads for them to let her stay.

The Girl struggles to adapt to life in the bunker. Mother is suspicious of the Girl, and voices her concerns to the Father while also trying to teach the Girl about their life and trying to investigate her motives. The Mother tries to be intimate with the Father, who is surprised by her actions. The Girl and the Son slowly bond. The Son confesses to his parents that he is developing feelings for the Girl, and they argue about the nature of love and the Son's naïveté. The Son gifts the Girl with a watch, but she appears hesitant. The Girl argues with the Son about his scale models of the outside world when he tries to justify the brutality of the first transcontinental railroad. The Mother and Friend both struggle with sleeplessness and nightmares, which the Doctor downplays and prescribes them sleeping pills. During a writing session, the Son tries to learn more about their lives before and learn more about how his Father met Mother. The Butler and the Father describe love and longing, and the Son writes a flowery and embellished version of events where the Father met the Mother, which he later mimics back to the Mother.

Time moves on and they enter the winter. The family celebrates New Year's Eve with a program of skits and elaborate homemade costumes of animals, where the Butler and Father perform a soft shoe tap dance. During the New Year's Eve dinner, the Girl appeals to the Mother about leaving the rest of humanity behind, arguing with her about what guilt they must feel before the Father stops the conversation. Mother struggles with survivor's guilt, and after arguing with the Father who tells her that she chose this life as well, the Mother justifies their actions of leaving her family behind.

The Father continues to justify his actions while writing the book with the Son, and later tries to convince the Girl of his innocence, saying that all of the other corporations were worse than he was and he at least "cared". The Father reflects on his actions, his own mortality and age, and continues to justify how they contributed to the end. Eventually, the Son argues with the Father about why they left everyone else behind, and the Friend confesses that her son did not die from cancer but struggled with addiction, and she chose to leave him to come to the bunker. She later gets more sleeping pills from the Doctor and overdoses. The Son is distraught when they discover her body and argues with the Girl, telling her that it is her fault her family is dead.

Some time in the future, the Son and the Girl have a baby together, and the family gathers to celebrate the Girl's birthday, taking a family photo. The Girl and the Mother both ponder the future.

== Cast ==
- Tilda Swinton as Mother
- Michael Shannon as Father
- George MacKay as Son
- Moses Ingram as Girl
- Bronagh Gallagher as Friend
- Tim McInnerny as Butler
- Lennie James as Doctor
- Danielle Ryan as Mary

== Production ==
It was announced in October 2021 that Joshua Oppenheimer's next film would be produced by Neon, with Tilda Swinton, George MacKay and Stephen Graham set to star. In March 2023, Moses Ingram, Michael Shannon, Bronagh Gallagher, Tim McInnerny and Lennie James joined the cast, with Graham replaced by Shannon.

Filming began in Ireland in March 2023, with production also occurring in Italy and Germany. The production received €480,000 in funding from Eurimages.

Musical numbers

- "A Wonderful Gift" – George McKay, Michael Shannon, Tilda Swinton, Tim McInnerny, Bronagh Gallagher, Lennie James
- "Count Falling Stars" – Bronagh Gallagher, Marius de Vries
- "Alone" – George McKay, Bronagh Gallagher
- "Exhale" – Moses Ingram
- "We Kept Our Distance" – George McKay, Tilda Swinton, Moses Ingram, Bronagh Gallagher
- "Forever" – Moses Ingram
- "Catch Fire" – George McKay, Moses Ingram
- "If Only I" – George McKay, Michael Shannon, Tim McInnerny
- "Another Winter" – George McKay, Tilda Swinton, Moses Ingram
- "New Year's Eve" – Joshua Schmidt, Marius de Vries, Matt Robertson
- "The Mirror" – Tilda Swinton
- "The Big Blue Sky" – Michael Shannon, Tim McInerny
- "Our Future is Bright" – George Mackay, Michael Shannon, Tilda Swinton, Tim McInnerny, Moses Ingram, Lennie James

== Release ==
The film premiered at the 51st Telluride Film Festival on 31 August 2024, and was screened in the Special Presentations program at the Toronto International Film Festival on 6 September 2024. A few days after the film's premiere at Telluride, Mubi acquired distribution rights to it for the United Kingdom, Ireland, Germany and Austria. Scandinavian Film Distribution secured rights for Denmark and Sweden.

The film was given a limited theatrical release by Neon in the United States on 6 December 2024.

== Reception ==
=== Critical response ===
On the review aggregator website Rotten Tomatoes, 57% of 120 critics' reviews are positive, with an average rating of 6/10. The website's consensus reads: "The End doesn't lack for ambition or talent, but its bold vision is ill-served by a bloated runtime and monotonous musical score." Metacritic, which uses a weighted average, assigned the film a score of 65 out of 100, based on 34 critics, indicating "generally favorable" reviews.

Lovia Gyarkye of The Hollywood Reporter wrote, "The End requires complete submission to the off-kilter rules that govern this family and to Oppenheimer's ambitions to radicalize the musical genre. It's an admirable if uneven endeavor." Sheila O'Malley of RogerEbert.com gave the film two and a half stars out of four and wrote, "The experiment of The End may not entirely work, but it is good that it exists."

=== Accolades ===
Award	Ceremony date	Category	Recipient(s)	Result	Ref.
San Sebastián International Film Festival	28 September 2024	Golden Seashell	The End	Nominated	
Chicago International Film Festival	27 October 2024	Gold Hugo	The End	Nominated	
Robert Awards	31 January 2026	Best Production Design	Jette Lehmann	Nominated	
Robert Awards	31 January 2026	Best Visual Effects	Peter Hjorth and Mikael Windelin	Nominated	
