= DocWest =

Centre for production and research of documentary films

DocWest is the International Centre for Documentary and Experimental Film at the University of Westminster in London, founded in 2009. It hosts screenings, masterclasses, and conferences featuring documentary filmmakers. The centre is part of Westminster's Centre for Research and Education in Arts and Media (CREAM).

DocWest's activities include teaching, film production, and academic research, focusing on the historical development of documentary discourse and its relationship with art and politics. Areas of study include visual anthropology and human rights, arts documentary, and the documentary archive. DocWest also explores emerging forms such as interactive and web-based documentaries. DocWest offers theoretical and practice-based doctoral degrees covering a range of documentary contexts and traditions.

== Notable projects ==
Projects include the 2013 film The Act of Killing, the Arts on Film Archive, and the book Killer Images. The Act of Killing was directed by DocWest Professor Joram ten Brink and filmmaker Joshua Oppenheimer. The film was nominated for the Academy Award for Best Documentary in 2014. The Act of Killing was also named Film of the Year by The Guardian and The Sight and Sound Film Poll, and won 72 awards, including a European Film Award, a BAFTA, an Asia Pacific Screen Award, a Berlinale Audience Award, and the Guardian Film Award for Best Film.
