= Anwar Congo =

Indonesian gangster (1937–2019)

- Born: Pangkalan Brandan, Langkat, Indonesia
- Died: 25 October 2019 (age 78); Medan, North Sumatra, Indonesia
- Military career
- Allegiance: Indonesia
- Nickname: Butcher of Medan
- Unit: Pancasila Youth
- Known for: Participation in Indonesian mass killings of 1965–66

Anwar Congo (died 25 October 2019) was an Indonesian gangster from Medan, North Sumatra, known for his appearance in the documentary film The Act of Killing. In the documentary, he spoke openly about and reenacted killings he perpetrated during the Indonesian mass killings of 1965–66, in which Congo estimated he killed as many as 1,000 people. During his lifetime, he was a prominent figure in the far-right paramilitary Pancasila Youth organization in his city.

== Early life ==
Congo was born in a port village to a poor Muslim family. The family would later move from Pangkalan Brandan to Medan. According to Congo's wife, Salma Miftah Salim, the name Anwar Tal'a Congo was given to him by his father, a shipping worker, as a souvenir from his visit to the Congo. Conversely, Congo himself stated that in 1960 during the Congo crisis, he had intended to go to the country as part of the peacekeeping contingent. He would ultimately not go, but the nickname Congo became part of his personal name. His father was a migrant from Jatijajar, Kebumen, while his mother was from Sumpiuh, Banyumas, and was brought to Langkat by Dutch colonialists. Congo only completed fourth grade at Taman Siswa Elementary School in Medan. In his youth, he had been a boxer in Pangkalan Brandan and a bowler in Medan. He would later play competitive bowling in Malaysia in the 1960s.

As a teenager, Congo joined a youth gang, and quickly gained authority as a Preman gangster, known by the nickname Dagger. Initially, he worked as a black market ticket-seller for the Medan cinema, where he was a fan of Hollywood gangster films. Congo and his friends were also fans of Hollywood actors such as John Wayne, James Dean, and Victor Mature. Congo's group was an element of the Medan criminal structure of Effendi Nasution.

=== Clashes with the PKI ===
Anwar held extreme right-wing political views, was a staunch nationalist and anti-communist, and an implacable opponent of the Communist Party of Indonesia (PKI). He was a member of the Pancasila Youth (PP) organization, which was founded by General Abdul Haris Nasution. The branch in North Sumatra, where Congo lived, was headed by Effendi Nasution.

The militants of the Pancasila Youth, including Congo, regularly engaged in physical clashes with the communist youth. In a 2012 interview, Congo described his dislike of communists, stating they had discriminated against people such as himself:

Generally, street children used to join a group that opposed the communist group. Like my friends, I used to hate communists the most. I was one of them. Generally, street children in every corner of North Sumatra disliked communists because they (PKI) considered street children to be the children of city robbers, never taught, uneducated.

He later became known as a thug and participated in the Indonesian mass killings of 1965–66.

== Indonesian mass killings of 1965–66 ==
On 30 September 1965, the 30 September Movement under the leadership of Lieutenant Colonel Untung Syamsuri attempted a coup d'état. The coup was suppressed by troops under the command of General Suharto and Colonel Sarwo Edhie Wibowo. The response was an anti-communist campaign, accompanied by mass murders of members and supporters of the PKI.

The Pancasila Youth played an important role in these events. In North Sumatra, the organization's militants came mainly from criminal groups, including the Medan structure, which included Congo. Congo's gang, known as the "Frog Squad", was hired by the military to act as a death squad in the mass killings.

Congo was especially cruel in clashes and reprisals against communists. The exact number of people killed by Congo personally is unknown, but Congo himself estimated killing about a thousand people. The militants used various methods and devices in the murders, preferring strangulation with wire (so as not to have to clean bloody weapons). The group took inspiration for their methods of killing from Hollywood films, specifically mafia films and Westerns starring John Wayne.

Congo later emphasized that he and his friends joined the anti-communist massacre not for money or recruitment, but out of feelings and convictions - because they considered the communists to be enemies of the Indonesian people and Islam, and sought revenge for the murders of six generals and many Muslims, as well as for the attempt to kill the founder of the PP, General Nasution.

During the New Order period, Congo supported the Suharto regime, and remained an active member of the Pancasila Youth. He maintained ties with Effendi Nasution. He controlled the film business in Medan.

== The Act of Killing ==
In 2012, American director Joshua Oppenheimer made the documentary film, The Act of Killing, about the massacres in Indonesia in 1965–1966. The project first materialized in 2003, and in 2005 Oppenheimer met Congo as his 41st interviewee. The figures focused on in the film were anti-communist Medan gangsters who actively participated in the murders. Congo, Adi Zulkadri, Safit Pardede, Herman Koto, Ibrahim Sinik — film buffs since childhood who dreamed of acting — all readily agreed.

They spoke in detail and thoroughly about the murders, demonstrated weapons and devices, and simulated scenes of reprisals. Congo expressed regret in connection with the excessive cruelty of the actions of that time, but in no way expressed remorse. He firmly stated that the murders of communists were committed in defense of Indonesia and were legitimate self-defense. He also recalled the atrocities of the PKI, the Communist Party's desire to establish a dictatorship, the murders of national army generals, many Muslims and ulema committed by the communists. His comrades, especially Adi Zulkadri, took an even more rigid position.

The film was intended to be titled Arsan and Amina, based on the love storyline. However, in Indonesia the film was instead shown under the title Jagal - Butcher. Congo, calling the film "true", expressed complaints to Oppenheimer for the title not being agreed upon. Anwar considered calling himself a "butcher" a "cruel deception." Oppenheimer denied that he had deceived anyone, stating everything he did was with Anwar's knowledge and permission.

Congo admitted to feeling deceived by Joshua Oppenheimer, the director of The Act of Killing, stating he was initially told the documentary's title was Arsan and Aminah. Oppenheimer himself said that he was close to Anwar, and had a Skype conversation before the film was released in Indonesia.

Foreign observers have noted not only the extreme brutality but also the "astonishing narcissism of these bandits", as well as their high popularity in Indonesia. One of Congo's "many admirers" is former Indonesian Vice President Jusuf Kalla, who also participated in the anti-communist campaign of the 1960s.

After the film was shown, Yogyakarta resident Bramantjo Prijosusilo initiated a petition demanding that Congo be held accountable for the murders. In March 2014, Indonesian Police Chief General Haji Sutarman rejected the petition on the grounds that the events had taken place too long ago. Pancasila Youth Chairman Yapto Soerjosoemarno effectively expressed solidarity with Congo, considering his actions a harsh response to communist violence. At the same time, he noted that the role in The Act of Killing and the subsequent conflict with the director is a private matter for Congo, and not for PP as a whole. Until the end of his life, Congo remained a high authority for radical anti-communists in Indonesia, especially in the Pancasila Youth. He participated in public events and was described as a public figure. He regularly communicated with the major right-wing radical politician Yapto Soerjosoemarno, the chairman of the Pancasila Youth, and leader of the Patriot Party.

== Death ==
Congo died in a Medan hospital on 25 October 2019, reported to be at the age of 78. According to his widow, his last wish was to meet his grandchildren, who had come specially from Jakarta. In the media, he was referred to as "the leader of anti-communist death squads" and "the Butcher of Medan".

A Muslim funeral took place in the village of Jalan Sutrisno near Medan. Congo had ordered a tomb for himself in advance, sensing his imminent death. Friends and neighbors, Pancasila Youth activists, participants in the 1965–66 mass killings, and the vice-governor of North Sumatra, Musa Rajekshah, attended the funeral ceremony. Joshua Oppenheimer expressed his condolences to Congo's family.

== Personal life ==
Congo was married with children. He lived in Medan, near a former cinema, since converted into a shop. At his residence, his decorations included the Indonesian flag, a poster of The Act of Killing displaying the film's alternate title Arsan dan Aminah, and a bust of his own face. He was known for his commitment to the Pancasila rituals. As a hobby, Congo would ride his Honda Vario motorcycle.
