= List of accolades received by The Act of Killing =

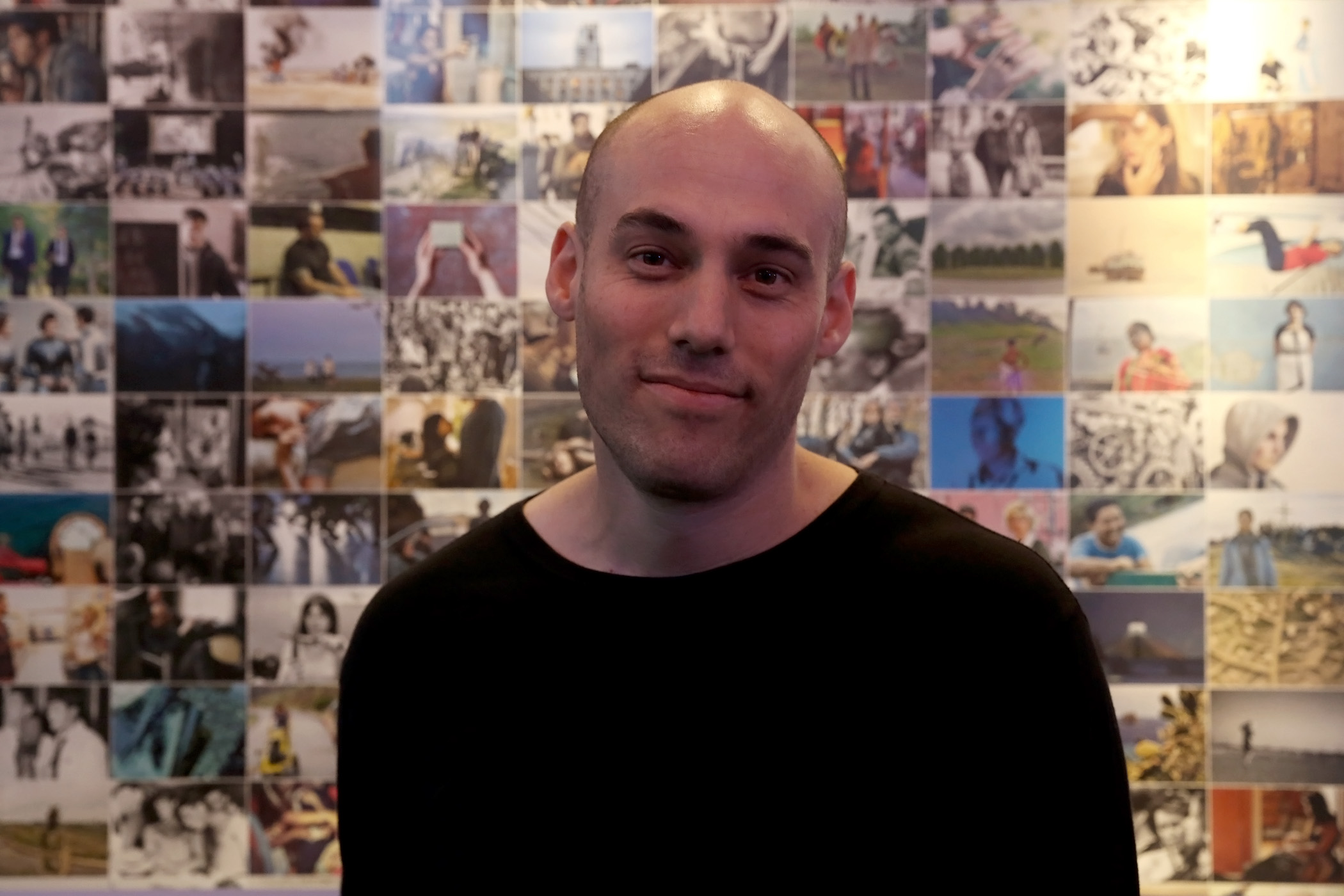
- Joshua Oppenheimer received many awards and nominations for his direction of the film.
Accolades
Award	Won	Nominated
Academy Award	0	1
Alliance of Women Film Journalists	0	1
Asia Pacific Screen Awards	1	1
Austin Film Critics Association	1	1
Australian Film Critics Association Film & Writing Awards	0	1
Bergen International Film Festival	1	1
Berlin International Film Festival	2	2
Bodil Awards	1	1
Boston Society of Film Critics Awards	1	1
BRITDOC Foundation	1	1
British Academy Film Awards	1	2
Chicago Film Critics Association	2	3
Cinema Eye Honors	3	6
CPH:DOX	1	1
Critics' Choice Movie Award	0	1
Dallas–Fort Worth Film Critics Association Awards	0	1
Detroit Film Critics Society	0	1
Directors Guild of America Award	0	1
Dorian Awards	0	1
Dublin Film Critics Circle	2	4
European Film Awards	1	1
Florida Film Critics Circle	1	1
Golden Trailer Awards	0	1
Gotham Awards	1	1
Hollywood Reel Independent Film Festival	1	1
Hong Kong International Film Festival	0	1
Houston Film Critics Society	0	1
Independent Spirit Awards	0	1
International Documentary Association Award	0	1
International Film Festival and Forum on Human Rights	1	1
London Film Critics' Circle	1	1
Los Angeles Film Critics Association	0	1
Message to Man	1	1
National Board of Review Awards	1	1
National Society of Film Critics	1	1
New York Film Critics Online	1	1
Nordisk Panorama	1	1
One World Film Festival	1	1
Online Film Critics Society	1	1
Robert Awards	1	1
San Diego Film Critics Society	1	1
San Francisco Film Critics Circle	1	1
Satellite Award	0	1
Sheffield Doc/Fest	2	2
St. Louis Film Critics Association	0	1
Toronto Film Critics Association	1	1
Traverse City Film Festival	1	1
Vancouver Film Critics Circle	1	1
Washington D.C. Area Film Critics Association	0	1
Yamagata International Documentary Film Festival	1	1
ZagrebDox	1	1

Total number of awards and nominations
Totals	40	64

The Act of Killing (Indonesian: Jagal) is a 2012 Danish-British-Norwegian documentary film directed by Joshua Oppenheimer, Christine Cynn, and an anonymous Indonesian co-director. The film explores the social significance of the Indonesian mass killings of 1965–1966 by focusing on the perpetrators and having them produce reenactments of the killings in the style of various Hollywood genres. The film's primary subjects had been petty criminals, but came to lead a powerful death squad during the anti-communist purge which resulted in the death of an estimated 500,000–2,000,000 suspected communists, communist sympathisers, alleged leftists, and ethnic Chinese. As many of the institutions and people responsible remained in power, those who carried out the killings were never held to account and continue to hold positions of power and respect. Oppenheimer was struck by the extent to which people not only rationalised but boasted about their participation in the killings, and used the film to explore the role the events continue to play in people's lives in the present. According to Oppenheimer, it is "about a regime in which genocide has, paradoxically, been effaced and celebrated – in order to keep the survivors terrified, the public brainwashed, and the perpetrators able to live with themselves."

The film first screened in September 2012 at the Telluride Film Festival in Colorado, and had its public premiere on July 19, 2013, in New York City. Its worldwide box office earnings totaled over $0.5 million USD, and it made $1.1 million in video sales. The Act of Killing has received worldwide critical acclaim. Rotten Tomatoes, a review aggregator, surveyed 137 reviews and judged 96% to be positive. Metacritic, another review aggregator, evaluated 30 reviews, finding an average score of 89 out of 100, indicating "universal acclaim".

The Act of Killing garnered awards and nominations primarily in the Best Documentary category and for Oppenheimer's direction, but also audience awards, special awards, and recognition for Signe Byrge Sørensen's production and editing by Janus Billeskov Jansen and Niels Pagh Andersen. Among its Best Documentary awards are a BAFTA, European Film Award, and a Robert Award, along with nominations for an Academy Award, Critics' Choice Movie Award, Directors Guild of America Award, Independent Spirit Award, and International Documentary Association Award. Included in many of the awards was the anonymous Indonesian co-director, who was unable to share in the recognition because of the danger posed by his or her participation.

The Act of Killing was screened only in underground venues in Indonesia, but its success led to media coverage there, generating controversy and opening a conversation about the past. In Oppenheimer's BAFTAs acceptance speech, he reported that the subject is receiving more attention, and that the film "is helping to catalyse a change in how Indonesia talks about its past". Oppenheimer also used the platform afforded by the awards to call attention to the "collective responsibility" of the United States and United Kingdom for "participating and ignoring" the crimes of 1965–66. When it was nominated for an Academy Award, the Indonesian government responded with a full-page statement about the killings and the film in the Jakarta Globe. The response marks the first time the government has admitted wrongdoing. The nomination also stoked controversy in China, where it had not been well known that Chinese people were the target of a significant amount of the violence.

== Accolades ==
Award	Date of ceremony	Category	Recipient(s) and nominee(s)	Result	Ref(s)
Academy Award	2 March 2014	Best Documentary Feature	Joshua Oppenheimer and Signe Byrge Sørensen	Nominated	
Alliance of Women Film Journalists	8 December 2013	Best Documentary	Joshua Oppenheimer	Nominated	
Asia Pacific Screen Awards	12 December 2013	Best Documentary Feature Film	The Act of Killing	Won	
Austin Film Critics Association	17 December 2013	Best Documentary	Joshua Oppenheimer	Won	
Australian Film Critics Association Film & Writing Awards	1 March 2014	Best Documentary	The Act of Killing	Nominated	
Bergen International Film Festival	30 October 2013	Checkpoints Prize	The Act of Killing	Won	
Berlin International Film Festival	16 February 2013	Panorama Audience Award	Joshua Oppenheimer	Won	
Berlin International Film Festival	16 February 2013	Panorama Ecumenical Jury Prize	Joshua Oppenheimer	Won	
Bodil Awards	16 March 2013	Bodil Special Award	Joshua Oppenheimer	Won	
Boston Society of Film Critics Awards	8 December 2013	Best Documentary	The Act of Killing	Won	
BRITDOC Foundation	14 November 2013	PUMA Impact Award	The Act of Killing	Won	
British Academy Film Awards	16 February 2014	Best Documentary	Joshua Oppenheimer	Won	
British Academy Film Awards	16 February 2014	Best Film Not in the English Language	Joshua Oppenheimer and Signe Byrge Sørensen	Nominated	
Chicago Film Critics Association	17 December 2013	Best Documentary	The Act of Killing	Won	
Chicago Film Critics Association	17 December 2013	Best Foreign-Language Film	The Act of Killing	Won	
Chicago Film Critics Association	17 December 2013	Most Promising Filmmaker	Joshua Oppenheimer	Nominated	
Cinema Eye Honors	8 January 2014	Audience Choice	Joshua Oppenheimer	Nominated	
Cinema Eye Honors	8 January 2014	Outstanding Achievement in Direction	Joshua Oppenheimer	Nominated	
Cinema Eye Honors	8 January 2014	Outstanding Achievement in Editing	Janus Billeskov Jansen and Niels Pagh Andersen	Nominated	
Cinema Eye Honors	8 January 2014	Outstanding Achievement in Nonfiction Feature Filmmaking	Joshua Oppenheimer and Signe Byrge Sørensen	Won	
Cinema Eye Honors	8 January 2014	Outstanding Achievement in Production	Signe Byrge Sørensen	Won	
Cinema Eye Honors	8 January 2014	Unforgettables	Anwar Congo (Note: Shared with Lisa Fischer (20 Feet From Stardom), Edwin Honig (First Cousin Once Removed), William Kamkwamba (William and the Windmill), Freda Kelly (Good Ol' Freda), Kevin Pearce and David Pearce (The Crash Reel), Neil Platt (I Am Breathing), Michael Polley (Stories We Tell), Pug (12 O'Clock Boys), Rafea (Rafea: Solar Mama), Susan Robinson and Shelley Sella (After Tiller), Chris "Wonder" Schoeck (Bending Steel), Ushio Shinohara and Noriko Shinohara (Cutie and the Boxer), Tilikum (Blackfish), and Nadezhda Tolokonnikova (Pussy Riot: A Punk Prayer).)	Won	
CPH:DOX	12 November 2012	CPH:DOX Award	Joshua Oppenheimer	Won	
Critics' Choice Movie Award	16 January 2014	Best Documentary Feature	The Act of Killing	Nominated	
Dallas–Fort Worth Film Critics Association Awards	16 December 2013	Best Documentary	The Act of Killing	2nd place	
Detroit Film Critics Society	16 December 2013	Best Documentary Film	The Act of Killing	Nominated	
Directors Guild of America Award	25 January 2014	Outstanding Directing – Documentaries	Joshua Oppenheimer	Nominated	
Dorian Awards	21 January 2014	Documentary of the Year	The Act of Killing	Nominated	
Dublin Film Critics Circle	18 December 2013	Best Director	Joshua Oppenheimer	Nominated	
Dublin Film Critics Circle	18 December 2013	Best Documentary	The Act of Killing	Won	
Dublin Film Critics Circle	18 December 2013	Best Film	The Act of Killing	Nominated	
Dublin Film Critics Circle	18 December 2013	Breakthrough of the Year	Joshua Oppenheimer	Won	
European Film Awards	7 December 2013	Best Documentary	Joshua Oppenheimer	Won	
Florida Film Critics Circle	18 December 2013	Best Documentary	Joshua Oppenheimer	Won	
Golden Trailer Awards	30 May 2014	Best Foreign Documentary Trailer	The Act of Killing	Nominated	
Gotham Awards	2 December 2013	Best Documentary	The Act of Killing	Won	
Hollywood Reel Independent Film Festival	23 February 2014	Best Picture	Joshua Oppenheimer	Won	
Hong Kong International Film Festival	2 April 2013	Documentary Competition awards	The Act of Killing	Nominated	
Houston Film Critics Society	8 December 2013	Best Documentary	The Act of Killing	Nominated	
Independent Spirit Awards	1 March 2014	Best Documentary Feature	Joshua Oppenheimer, Joram Ten Brink, Christine Cynn, Anne Köhncke, Signe Byrge Sørensen, Michael Uwemedimo, and Anonymous	Nominated	
International Documentary Association Award	7 December 2013	Best Feature	Joshua Oppenheimer, Signe Byrge Sørensen, Errol Morris, Werner Herzog, Torstein Grude, André Singer, Joram ten Brink, and Bjarte Mørner Tveit	Nominated	
International Film Festival and Forum on Human Rights	10 March 2013	Gilda Vieira de Mello Prize	Joshua Oppenheimer	Won	
London Film Critics' Circle	2 February 2014	Documentary of the Year	The Act of Killing	Won	
Los Angeles Film Critics Association	8 December 2013	Best Documentary Film	Joshua Oppenheimer, Anonymous, and Christine Cynn	Runner-up	
Message to Man	28 September 2013	Press Jury Prize	The Act of Killing (Note: Shared with Naked Opera.)	Won	
National Board of Review Awards	8 January 2014	Top Five Documentaries	The Act of Killing (Note: Shared with 20 Feet From Stardom, After Tiller, Casting By, and The Square.)	Won	
National Society of Film Critics	4 January 2014	Best Non-Fiction Film	Joshua Oppenheimer (Note: Shared with At Berkeley (Frederick Wiseman).)	Won	
New York Film Critics Online	8 December 2013	Best Documentary	The Act of Killing	Won	
Nordisk Panorama	25 September 2013	Best Nordic Documentary	Joshua Oppenheimer	Won	
One World Film Festival	11 March 2013	Best Film	Joshua Oppenheimer	Won	
Online Film Critics Society	16 December 2013	Best Documentary Film	The Act of Killing	Won	
Robert Awards	28 February 2013	Best Documentary Feature	Joshua Oppenheimer and Signe Byrge Sørensen	Won	
San Diego Film Critics Society	11 December 2013	Best Documentary	The Act of Killing	Won	
San Francisco Film Critics Circle	13 December 2013	Best Documentary	The Act of Killing	Won	
Satellite Awards	23 February 2014	Best Documentary Film	The Act of Killing	Nominated	
Sheffield Doc/Fest	16 June 2013	Audience Award	Joshua Oppenheimer (Note: Shared with Particle Fever (Mark Levinson).)	Won	
Sheffield Doc/Fest	16 June 2013	Special Jury Award	Joshua Oppenheimer	Won	
St. Louis Film Critics Association	16 December 2013	Best Documentary	The Act of Killing (Note: Runner-up with Stories We Tell.)	Runner-up	
Toronto Film Critics Association	16 December 2013	Best Documentary	The Act of Killing	Won	
Traverse City Film Festival	4 August 2013	Stanley Kubrick Award for Bold and Innovative Filmmaking	The Act of Killing	Won	
Vancouver Film Critics Circle	7 January 2014	Best Documentary	The Act of Killing	Won	
Washington D.C. Area Film Critics Association	17 December 2013	Best Documentary	The Act of Killing	Nominated	
Yamagata International Documentary Film Festival	17 October 2013	Mayor's Prize	Joshua Oppenheimer	Won	
ZagrebDox	3 March 2013	Movies That Matter Award	Joshua Oppenheimer	Won	
