= The Magnitsky Act – Behind the Scenes =

2016 film by Andrei Nekrasov

- Directed by: Andrei Nekrasov
- Written by: Andrei Nekrasov; Torstein Grude
- Produced by: Torstein Grude; Pertti Veijaleinen; Venla Hellstedt; Peter Engel
- Starring: Andrei Nekrasov; Bill Browder
- Cinematography: Tore Vollan; Torstein Grude; Joona Pettersson
- Edited by: Philipp Gromov
- Music by: Karsten Fundal
- Production company: Piraya Film AS
- Distributed by: Norwegian Film Institute
- Release dates: June 13, 2016 (United States); June 25, 2016 (Norway); June 28, 2016 (Moscow International Film Festival)
- Running time: 125 minutes (2018) cut from 152 minutes (2016)
- Country: Norway
- Languages: English; Russian
- Budget: 8.9MM kr

The Magnitsky Act – Behind the Scenes is a 2016 film directed by Andrei Nekrasov, concerning the 2009 death in a Moscow prison cell, after 11 months in police custody, of 37-year-old Russian tax accountant Sergei Magnitsky. In 2007, Magnitsky was hired by American-born British financier Bill Browder to investigate the government's seizure of three of Browder's Russian subsidiaries. Discovering evidence of embezzlement, Magnitsky implicated two senior police officers in a tax rebate scam that used shell corporations plundered from Browder's holdings to defraud the Russian treasury of $230 million. Subordinates of those officials then arrested Magnitsky and charged him with the very crime he had exposed.

However, after initially presenting the widely accepted story about murdering of Magnitsky in prison by guards on the orders from Russian state officials, the movie suggested an alternative version of the event that, as The Guardian relates, "Magnitsky was not beaten while in police custody, and that he did not make any specific allegations against individuals in his testimony to Russian authorities." By suggesting that Magnitsky was, as paraphrased by The New York Times, "an accomplice rather than a victim," the film has provoked international controversy.

The film takes its title from the Magnitsky Act, a bipartisan bill passed by the U.S. Congress and signed by President Barack Obama in 2012, designed to punish Russian officials allegedly responsible for Magnitsky's death.

== Cast ==
- Andrei Nekrasov as himself
- Bill Browder as himself
- Marieluise Beck as herself
- Maria Sannikova-Franck as herself
- Andreas Gross as himself
- Pavel Karpov as himself
- Pavel Lapshov as himself
- Andrey Pavlov as himself
- Eduard Khayretdinov as himself
- Nataliya Magnitskaya as herself
- Anna Avramenko as herself
- Tore Vollan as himself
- Evgeniy Lunchenko as Magnitsky
- Gennadiy Popenko as Karpov
- Oleksandr Berezhok as Kuznetsov (as Alexander Berezhok)
- Yekaterina Bashkina as Magnitsky's wife
- Ivan Doan as Jamison

== Production ==
The film is a co-production of German public television broadcaster ZDF, Wingman Media ApS, and Illume OY, with support from the Norwegian Film Institute, Nordisk Film & TV Fond, Finnish Film Foundation, Fritt Ord Foundation, Hinterland AS, and Stiftelsen Matriark Foundation. (Note: Supporting organizations are listed on the closing credits and film poster.)

The Prosecutor General of Russia and the Interior Ministry of Russia did not respond to the filmmaker's requests to share materials relevant to the investigation. (Note: Unresponsive Russian authorities are listed on the closing credits.)

== Release ==
The film's premiere was set for the European Parliament in Brussels on April 27, 2016. The event was organized by Finnish Green Party politician and MEP Heidi Hautala. In 2010, Hautala introduced her then-boyfriend Andrei Nekrasov to Bill Browder. Now Nekrasov had made a film featuring extensive interview footage of Browder and challenging his single-handed control of the Magnitsky narrative.

At the eleventh hour, the premiere was canceled. The New York Times said threats of libel suits from Bill Browder accusing Nekrasov of defaming both him and Magnitsky had accompanied the cancellation. Nekrasov blamed two last-minute interventions. The first was from MEP Marieluise Beck, unhappy because Nekrasov refused to remove her interview segment from his film. The second objection, which Nekrasov considered decisive, came from the film's principal sponsor, German public television broadcaster ZDF. Along with its French public television subsidiary Arte, ZDF also shelved the film a few days before its scheduled telecast.

The Magnitsky Act – Behind the Scenes premiered in Oslo, Norway in June 2016.

== Reception ==
In June 2016, The New York Times reported that the film was "generating a furor." On June 13, it was shown by invitation only at the Newseum, a private museum in Washington, D.C. dedicated to the news industry. The Washington Post called it part of "a campaign to discredit Browder and the Magnitsky Act." Lawyers for Browder and Sergei Magnitsky's mother demanded that the screening be canceled. The New York Times said showing it at the Newseum, which "sits on Pennsylvania Avenue in the shadow of the Capitol," was "especially controversial because it could attract lawmakers or their aides." Besides congressional staffers, invitees included representatives from the United States Department of State and the White House National Security Council." In the letter sent to the European Parliament relatives of Magnitsky wrote:

Each part of the movie, each passage where the author tries to lie and besmirch Sergei Magnitsky, or to deride him can be easily refuted by dozens of original documents (...) This movie is made in the interests of those who are scared of the truth uncovered by Sergei Magnitsky.

— Letter from the Magnitsky Family sent to the European Parliament, 26 April 2016

Bill Browder published a list of seven key claims presented in the movie along with evidence proving they are false, for example that Magnitsky was not beaten in the custody and that he did not report the tax fraud against Hermitage to the police. In his book, Freezing Order: A True Story of Russian Money Laundering, Murder, and Surviving Vladimir Putin's Wrath, Browder describes the events at the Newseum screening. The film was introduced by Seymour Hersh, who stated that it would go "a long way to deconstructing a myth." Like the reviewers of The Washington Post, the audience was very vocal following the screening that the film looked more like propaganda than journalism.

The Daily Beast reported that Natalia Veselnitskaya, the Russian lawyer who met with Donald Trump Jr. four days earlier to criticize the Magnitsky Act, paid for and attended the Newseum screening, to which Congressman Dana Rohrabacher, a senior member of the House Committee on Foreign Affairs, was invited to "try to recruit him to the Russian cause."

When management refused to cancel the event, The Nation commented that "the Newseum deserves great credit for sticking to its principles," adding that "the film provides a valuable service by asking how it is that American (and European) officials bought Browder's story without doing even the slightest due diligence. The American and European legislators who took Browder's version of events on faith now look credulous, at best."

The Washington Post, however, commented in an editorial: "The film is a piece of agitprop that mixes fact and fiction to blame Magnitsky for the fraud and absolve Russians of blame for his death." According to The Post, "Mr. Nekrasov declares, 'Magnitsky wasn't a whistleblower. Magnitsky did not accuse any police officers. Magnitsky did not even investigate anything.' He adds, 'The young man died in a Russian prison. I do not believe it was murder. It was a case of negligence and the Russian system is to blame in many ways, but it wasn't murder; he wasn't murdered by the Russian state as Mr. Browder claims.' This is just what President Vladimir Putin and his honchos want the West to hear."

The Post predicted, "The film won't grab a wide audience but it offers yet another example of the Kremlin's increasingly sophisticated efforts to spread its illiberal values and mind-set abroad. In the European Parliament and on French and German television networks, showings were put off recently after questions were raised about the accuracy of the film, including by Magnitsky's family. We don't worry that Mr. Nekrasov's film was screened here, in an open society. But it is important that such slick spin be fully exposed for its twisted story and sly deceptions."

== Supporting Evidence ==
On 22 November 2019, German news magazine Der Spiegel published an article in which it claimed Browder accusations concerning the "Magnitsky Case", do not withstand thorough examination and thereby corroborating the central claims made by Nekrasov. The English version appeared on 26 November 2019. After Browder filed a complaint against this article with chief editorship of Der Spiegel and the German Press Council, Der Spiegel published a further article, releasing its evidence and emphasising its stance on the matter.

== Awards ==
Conferred by	Year	Award
Moscow International Film Festival	2016	Special Commendation
Prix Europa (Berlin)	2016	Special Commendation
Signes de Nuit (Paris)	2017	Night Award and Main Award, Student Jury
Festival Internacional Signos de la Noche (Tucumán, Argentina)	2018	Night Award
16th International Festival Signs of the Night (Bangkok, Thailand)	2018	The Signs Award

== Other festivals ==
- Nordisk Panorama, Malmö (2016)
- Bergen International Film Festival (2016)
- Kapittel Film, Stavanger (2016)
- Helsinki International Film Festival (2016)
- Eurodok, Oslo (2017)
- Tampere Film Festival (2017)
- Nordic/Docs, Fredrikstad (2017)
- The Norwegian Short Film Festival, Grimstad (2017)
