= Arts on Film =

Arts on Film archive, at Docwest, University of Westminster, is an on-line archive to a large range of films on art produced in the United Kingdom since the 1950s. It is a record of British and international post-war art, as well as of the history of documentary film-making in the UK. The archive offers a complete database and an on-line video streaming (for UK academic users) of all 450 films made by the film department of Arts Council England between 1953 and 1998 and several films produced till 2003 by the dance Department of ACE. Many titles in the collection contain rare material about individual artists, while others offer definitive coverage of their subject. The archive is a primary research resource for a wide range of scholars in arts and humanities. The archive was built with the support of the Arts and Humanities Research Council. Prof. Joram ten Brink - archive director; Elaine Burrows - database and catalogue; Steve Foxon - film restoration and encoding.
