= Andrei Nekrasov =

Russian television and film director

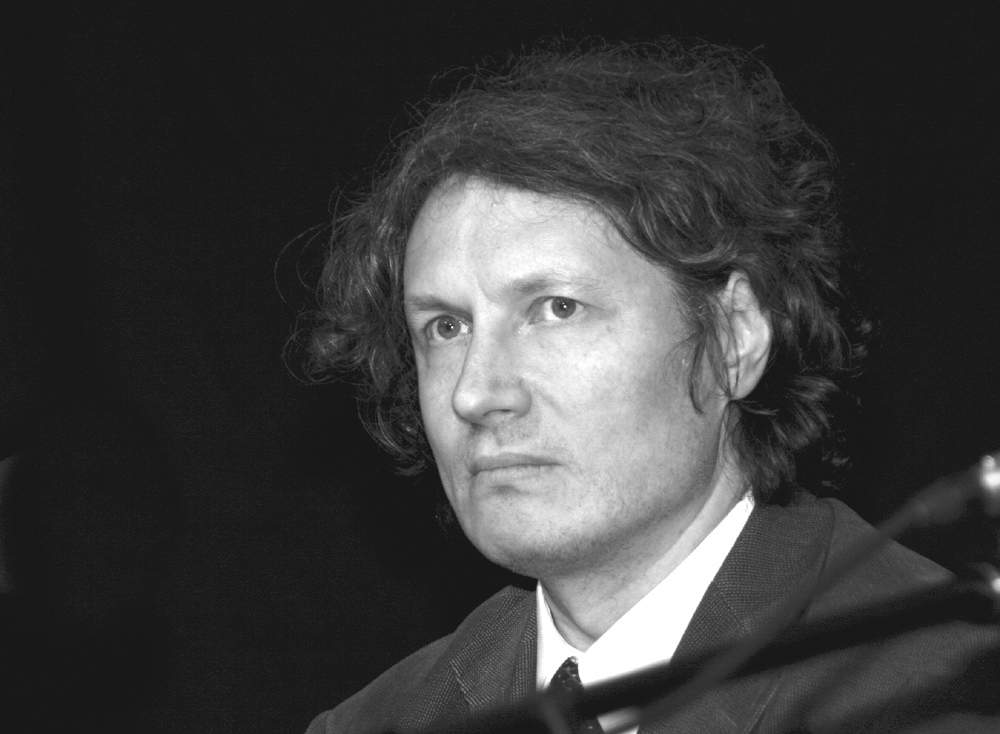
Andrei Nekrasov 2007

Andrei Lvovich Nekrasov (Russian: Андре́й Льво́вич Некра́сов; born 26 February 1958 in Saint Petersburg) is a Russian film and TV director from Saint Petersburg.

== Life and career ==
Andrei Nekrasov studied acting and directing at the Russian State Institute of Performing Arts in his native Saint Petersburg. He studied comparative literature and philosophy at the University of Paris, taking a master's degree, and film at Bristol University Film School. In 1985, he assisted Andrei Tarkovsky during the filming and editing of The Sacrifice. Nekrasov then made several internationally coproduced documentaries and TV arts programs (notably A Russia of One's Own, Pasternak, The Prodigal Son, and Children's Stories: Chechnya). His first drama short, Springing Lenin (1993) won the UNESCO prize at the Cannes Film Festival that year, and in 1997 his first feature, Love is as Strong as Death won the FIPRESCI prize at Mannheim-Heidelberg. The director's second feature, Lubov and Other Nightmares (2001) won recognition at a great many of festivals all over the world (including Sundance and Berlin) and confirmed his status as a rebel among Russian filmmakers.

Andrei Nekrasov is also a playwright and a theater director. His German productions (of his own plays) include: Der Spieler (The Gambler) in Euro Theater Central in Bonn and Koenigsberg in the Volksbuehne Theatre in Berlin.

Nekrasov's 2007 film, Rebellion: the Litvinenko Case (U.S. Title: Poisoned by Pollonium. The Litvinenko File) presents interviews with assassinated former FSB officer Alexander Litvinenko and journalist Anna Politkovskaya. The movie contends that Russian state security service FSB, the successor agency to the KGB, organized bombings of apartments in Moscow and taking hostages in a Moscow theater to justify the second war in Chechnya and bring Vladimir Putin to power. The film was premiered in the official selection of Cannes Film Festival in 2007.

His films include the documentary Disbelief (Недоверие) on the 1999 Russian apartment bombings. This film is available in DVD as an extra to Rebellion: The Litvinenko Case, but a low resolution version is available on Google Video.

Russian Lessons, co-directed and produced by his wife Olga Konskaya and Norwegian producer Torstein Grude, deals with the Russian-Georgian war of 2008. It documents a journey by two directors-protagonists, Olga Konskaya and Andrei Nekrasov, one on each side of the frontline during the hostilities. For this documentary, Nekrasov was named The Person of 2009 in the Georgian Public Broadcaster's internet survey.

In 2011 Nekrasov received an Oxfam Novib/PEN Award.

In 2012 Nekrasov released Farewell Comrades!, a six-part documentary series on the last phase of communism in Eastern Europe, produced for ARTE, YLE and many other European networks by Artline Films (France) and Gebrueder Beetz Filmproduktion (Germany). Nekrasov received the GRIMME Award 2013 for Farewell Comrades!

In the autumn of 2015 Al Jazeera English broadcast In Search of Putin's Russia, a four-part documentary series made by Nekrasov in collaboration with British film-maker Melanie Anstey which explored the attitudes of ordinary Russians towards Vladimir Putin and the country's recent history.

Nekrasov's film The Magnitsky Act – Behind the Scenes, produced in Norway by Piraya Film, supported by a number of European film funds and the public Franco-German TV network Arte TV and completed in 2016, caused a major controversy. The film alleges that western politicians and media were misled by Bill Browder, a U.S. born investor and campaigner, into believing that the Russian tax consultant Sergei Magnitsky had been persecuted and killed for exposing corruption. Bill Browder's version of Magnitsky's life and death has been widely accepted across the world, and became the basis for legislations and sanctions in a number of countries, first of all the U.S. The premiere of Nekrasov's film at the European Parliament, scheduled for April 26, 2016, was stopped at the last moment. A TV broadcast in Germany and France and film's public screenings were cancelled due to Browder's legal challenges.

According to Browder and some media, the film was promoted by a group of Russian patriots that included Natalia Veselnitskaya. Dana Rohrabacher (R-CA)'s office actively promoted the screening, sending out invitations from the office of the House Foreign Affairs Subcommittee on Europe, Eurasia and Emerging Threats, which Rohrabacher chaired.

On August 14, 2024, Andrei Nekrasov was arrested by the FSB, Russia's domestic intelligence service, in the Smolensk region for filming near an FSB building without a permit for a new film project. Nekrasov spent seven and a half weeks in a prison-like “center for the temporary detention of foreign citizens”. After Western media reported on his detention, he was deprived of all means of communication except for a short phone call with a family member once a day. During his detention, Nekrassow wrote several texts that also deal with the conditions of his detention, a novel and a philosophical essay.

== Filmography ==
- 2016 The Magnitsky Act – Behind the Scenes, documentary, Piraya Film, Norway
- 2015 In Search of Putin's Russia, TV, documentary, Al Jazeera English.
- 2012 Farewell, Comrades!, TV, documentary, 6x52 min, ARTE, France/Germany.
- 2010 Russian Lessons, Documentary.
- 2007 Rebellion: the Litvinenko Case, 113 min, Documentary, Premiere: Festival de Cannes 2007
- 2007 My Friend Sasha: A Very Russian Murder, documentary on Alexander Litvinenko (BBC Two Storyville, 22 January 2007)
- 2004 Disbelief, Feature documentary, Russia-USA (Watch Free on Google Video)
- 2001 Lubov and Other Nightmares, Feature, Russia-Germany
- 2000 Children’s Stories, Chechnya, documentary, Vanessa Redgrave and Dreamscanner, UK-Russia
- 1997 Love is as strong as Death, Feature
- 1993 Springing Lenin, British Film Institute - BBC
- 1991 The Prodigal Son, BBC-La Sept-ZDF, UK-France-Germany
- 1990 Pasternak, ITV-WDR, UK-Germany-Russia
- 1989 Raising the Curtain, TV, documentary, 25 min, Channel 4
- 1987 A Russia of One's Own, Channel 4

== Prizes and awards ==
- 1987 - Channel 4’s sole nomination for the Prix Italia (A Russia of One's Own, 1987)
- 1993 - Cannes Film Festival UNESCO Prize 1993 (Springing Lenin, 1993)
- 1997 - FIPRESCI Prize at the Mannheim-Heidelberg International Filmfestival (Love is as strong as Death, 1997) 'For the sharp moral and social perspective and the strong, expressive visual language which characterise the film’s view of contemporary reality.'
- 1997 - Special Jury Prize (Kinotavr), Russian International Film Festival (Love is as strong as Death)
- 2001 - Special Jury Prize, Moscow International Film Festival (Lubov and Other Nightmares, 2001) "for the innovative film language".
- 2001 - Best Lead Female Award (Kinotavr), Russian International Film Festival (Lubov and Other Nightmares)
- 2001 - Nominated for Golden Aries Award – all Russian film critics prize (Lubov and Other Nightmares, 2001)
- 2004 - Special Mention from the Amnesty Jury, Cph:dox, Copenhagen (Disbelief, 2004)
- 2005 - Best Documentary Award, Karachi International Film Festival (Disbelief, 2004)
- 2008 - Rudolf Vrba Award for Rebellion. The Litvinenko Case. One World Film Festival, Prague
- 2011 - Oxfam Novib/PEN Award
- 2010 - Golden Chair Best Documentary for Russian Lessons, Grimstad, Norway
- 2013 - Grimme Award for Farewell, Comrades!, Germany
- 2016 - Prix Europa Special Commendation for The Magnitsky Act – Behind the Scenes
