= The Look of Silence =

2014 film

- Theatrical release poster
- Directed by: Joshua Oppenheimer; Anonymous
- Produced by: Signe Byrge Sørensen
- Cinematography: Lars Skree
- Edited by: Niels Pagh Andersen
- Music by: Seri Banang; Mana Tahan
- Production companies: Anonymous; Final Cut for Real; Making Movies Oy; Piraya Film A/S; Spring Films
- Distributed by: Why Not Productions (France); Koch Media (Germany); Cinema Delicatessen (Netherlands); Drafthouse Films (US)
- Release date: 28 August 2014 (Venice)
- Running time: 103 minutes
- Countries: Denmark; Finland; France; Germany; Indonesia; Israel; Netherlands; Norway; United Kingdom; United States
- Language: Indonesian
- Box office: $153,516

The Look of Silence (Indonesian: Senyap, "Silence") is a 2014 internationally co-produced documentary film directed by Joshua Oppenheimer about the Indonesian mass killings of 1965–66. The film is a companion piece to his 2012 documentary The Act of Killing. Executive producers were Werner Herzog, Errol Morris, and Andre Singer. It was nominated for the Academy Award for Best Documentary Feature at the 88th Academy Awards.

== Overview ==
Adi Rukun, a middle-aged Indonesian optometrist, has lived his whole life in an environment shaped by the unending grief his parents feel over the brutal murder of his older brother in the 1965 Indonesian Communist Purge, which occurred two years before Adi's birth. He watches extra footage from Oppenheimer's The Act of Killing project, which includes video of the men who killed his brother, and decides to visit and interview some of the killers and their collaborators—which turn out to include his uncle—while testing their eyesight. Although none of the killers expresses any remorse, the daughter of one of them is clearly shaken when she hears, apparently for the first time, the details of the killings. Interspersed between the confrontations are scenes of Adi's elderly mother and almost deaf and blind father.

Out of concern for their safety, many members of the film's Indonesian crew are credited only as "Anonymous".

== Release ==
The film was screened in the official competition at the 71st Venice International Film Festival, where it won the Grand Jury Prize, the International Film Critics Award (FIPRESCI), the Italian online critics award (Mouse d'Oro), the European Film Critics Award (FEDEORA), as well as the Human Rights Nights Award. Since then, it has gone on to win multiple awards, including Best World Documentary (Cinephile Prize) at the Busan International Film Festival, the Grand Prize (DOX Award) at CPH:DOX, the prize for Best Documentary at the Starz Denver Film Festival, a Danish Arts Council Award for outstanding achievement in filmmaking, and the Best Film Award at the One World human rights documentary film festival.

On 10 December 2014, International Human Rights Day, there were 480 public screenings of the film across Indonesia, including a premiere screening in Jakarta attended by 2000 people. The screenings of the film in Indonesia has been sponsored by the National Human Rights Commission of Indonesia and the Jakarta Arts Council.

It was selected for screening in the Berlinale Special Galas section of the 65th Berlin International Film Festival in February 2015.

In February 2016, Oppenheimer, along with Amnesty International and Human Rights Watch, screened the film for members of the United States Senate Committee on Foreign Relations and their House counterparts, officials from the Department of State, and members of the White House National Security Council staff. Oppenheimer hoped the Oscar buzz the film was generating would pressure the US government to formally acknowledge its collusion in the killings.

After its theatrical release, the film aired on US television as part of the PBS series POV.

== Reception ==
=== Critical response ===
The Look of Silence received critical acclaim. On review aggregator website Rotten Tomatoes, the film holds a 96% approval rating, and an average rating of 8.8/10, based on 142 reviews. The website's critical consensus states, "The Look of Silence delivers a less shocking – yet just as terribly compelling – companion piece to Joshua Oppenheimer's The Act of Killing". On Metacritic, the film has a 92 out of 100 rating based on 29 critics, indicating "universal acclaim". On 14 January 2016, the film was nominated for the Academy Award for Best Documentary Feature.

=== Awards and nominations ===
As of March 2016, The Look of Silence has won 70 international awards, including the following:

Award	Date of ceremony	Category	Recipients and nominees	Result
Academy Awards	28 February 2016	Best Documentary Feature		Nominated
Austin Film Critics Association	29 December 2015	The Best Documentary		Won
Berlin International Film Festival	16 February 2015	Peace Film Prize		Won
Bodil Awards	28 February 2015	Best Documentary		Won
Boston Society of Film Critics	6 December 2015	Best Foreign Language Film		Won
Busan International Film Festival	11 October 2014	Busan Cinephile Award		Won
Calgary Underground Film Festival 2015	23 April 2015	Jury Awards Best Documentary Feature		Won
Camerimage 2015	21 November 2015	Golden Frog—Grand Prix	Lars Skree	Won
Cinema Eye Honors	13 January 2016	Outstanding Achievement in Nonfiction Feature Filmmaking		Won
Cinema Eye Honors	13 January 2016	Outstanding Achievement in Direction		Won
Cinema Eye Honors	13 January 2016	Outstanding Achievement in Production		Won
CPH:DOX 2014	14 November 2014	DOX:AWARD		Won
Danish Film Academy/Robert Award	1 February 2015	Best Long Documentary		Won
Denver Film Festival 2014	23 November 2014	Best Documentary		Won
European Film Awards	12 December 2015	Best Documentary		Nominated
Gotham Awards 2015	30 November 2015	Best Documentary		Won
Göteborg International Film Festival 2015	31 January 2015	Dragon Award Best Nordic Documentary		Won
London Film Critics' Circle	17 January 2016	Film of the Year		Nominated
London Film Critics' Circle	17 January 2016	Documentary of the Year		Nominated
London Film Critics' Circle	17 January 2016	Foreign Language Film of the Year		Won
Los Angeles Film Critics Association	6 December 2015	Best Documentary		Runner-up
Nordisk Panorama – Nordic Short & Doc Film Festival	22 September 2015	Audience Award		Won
Online Film Critics Society Award	13 December 2015	The Best Documentary		Won
Prague One World Festival	11 March 2015	The Best Film Award		Won
The Ridenhour Prizes	22 March 2016	The Ridenhour Documentary Film Prize		Won
RiverRun International Film Festival	26 April 2015	Best Director (Documentary)	Joshua Oppenheimer	Won
Satellite Awards	21 February 2016	Best Documentary Film		Won
Sheffield International Documentary Festival	15 June 2015	Audience Award		Won
Sofia International Film Festival	15 March 2015	Best Documentary		Won
South by Southwest Film Festival	21 March 2015	Audience Awards Festival Favorites		Won
Spirit Awards	27 February 2016	Best Documentary		Won
Subversive Film Festival 2015	12 May 2015	Wild Dreamer Award		Won
Tromsø International Film Festival	17 January 2015	FICC Award/Don Quixote Prize		Won
True/False Film Festival	4 May 2015	True Life Award	Adi Rukun	Won
Venice International Film Festival	6 September 2014	Grand Jury Prize		Won
Venice International Film Festival	6 September 2014	FIPRESCI Award		Won
Venice International Film Festival	6 September 2014	Mouse d'Oro Award		Won
Venice International Film Festival	6 September 2014	Fedeora Award		Won
Venice International Film Festival	6 September 2014	Human Rights Nights Award		Won
Victoria Film Festival	15 May 2015	Best Documentary		Won
Vilnius International Film Festival	2 April 2015	Best Director (Baltic Gaze)	Joshua Oppenheimer	Won
