= Final Cut for Real =

Danish film production company

Final Cut for Real ApS
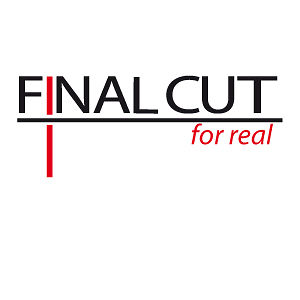
- Type: Private limited company
- Industry: Documentary film
- Founded: 2010
- Headquarters: Copenhagen, Denmark
- Key people: Signe Byrge Sørensen, Anne Köhncke
- Products: Film
- Website: www.finalcutforreal.dk

Final Cut for Real ApS is a film production company based in Copenhagen, Denmark specializing in documentaries for the international market. The two Oscar-nominated groundbreaking documentaries The Act of Killing (2012) and The Look of Silence (2014) helped establish the company as a recognized provider of independent creative documentaries on the international stage. The recent years, Final Cut for Real has also expanded to fiction films and virtual reality. In 2019 Final Cut for Real Norway was established.

== History & Overview ==
Final Cut for Real was founded in 2010 by the producers Signe Byrge Sørensen and Anne Köhncke, editor Janus Billeskov Jansen and film director Joshua Oppenheimer.

The company today consists of two additional producers, Monica Hellström (since 2010) and Heidi Elise Christensen, VR Producer/Post-Producer & Production Manager Maria Kristensen and Post-Producer & Editor Francesc Sitges-Sarda.

The company is based at Indiakaj in the former Freeport area of Copenhagen. Final Cut for Real has produced more than 30 documentaries, minor co-produced more than 20 documentaries and even co-produced a few feature films, among them Sundance winner The Nile Hilton Incident.

The productions of the company has been selected to a number of international film festivals, the documentaries has been part of e.g Cannes Film Festival, Berlin Film Festival, Toronto International Film Festival (Tiff), Sundance Film Festival, Telluride Film Festival, Moscow International Film Festival, Karlovy Vary International Film Festival, International Documentary Film Festival Amsterdam (IDFA), CPH:DOX (Copenhagen International Documentary Film Festival), Sheffield International Documentary Festival (SIDF), Hot Docs Canadian International Documentary Festival and others.

== Filmography ==
- A House Made of Splinters (2022)
- Flee (2021)
- President (2021)
- HUSH (2020)
- Songs of Repression (2020)
- Attacked - The Copenhagen Shootings (2020)
- Meanwhile on Earth (2020)
- Patrimonium (2019)
- Forget Me Not (2019)
- What Walaa Wants (2018)
- Death of a Child (2017)
- The Distant Barking of Dogs (2017)
- Dreaming Murakami (2017)
- A Drowning Man (2017)
- Land of the Free (2017)
- Les Sauteurs (2016)
- The Dvor Massacre (2015)
- Pebbles at Your Door (2015)
- Pervert Park (2014)
- The Look of Silence (2014)
- Far from Home (2014)
- Life is Sacred (2014)
- TPB AFK: The Pirate Bay Away from Keyboard (2013)
- Chikara –The Sumo Wrestler’s Son (2013)
- Säilöttyjä unelmia (2012)
- Gulabi Gang (2012)
- The Act of Killing (2012)
- The Human Scale (2012)
- Traveling with Mr. T. (2012)
- Hjemvendt (2011)
- Verdens bedste kok (2011)
- The Kid & The Clown (2011)

== Awards ==
Flee

- Nordic Council Film Prize 2021
- Sundance Film Festival 2021 - Grand Jury Prize
- Götenborg Film Festival 2021 - Dragon Award Best Nordic Documentary

President

- Sundance Film Festival 2021 - World Documentary Special Jury Award for Verité Filmmaking

HUSH

- AniDox:VR Awards 2020 - Most Innovative Work

Songs of Repression

- Festival Internacional de Documentales de Santiago (FIDOCS) 2020 - Best Chilean Documentary
- Reykjavik International Film Festival 2020 - "A Different Tomorrow" award
- CPH:DOX 2020 – DOX:AWARD (main competition award)
- CPH:DOX 2020 – Politiken:Danish:Dox (critic’s award)
- Festival Internacional de Cine Valdivia (FICValdivia) 2020 - Best Chilean Film
- Cork International Film Festival 2020 - Best Cinematic Documentary

PATRIMONIUM

- Moscow International Film Festival 2019 - Artistic Excellence Award

What Walaa Wants

- HotDocs 2018 - Special Jury Prize
- Margaret Mead Film Festival 2018 - Margaret Mead Filmmaker Award
- Vancouver International Film Festival 2018 - Women in Film + TV Artistic Merit Award
- Forest City Film Festival 2018 - Best Documentary Feature
- Ajyal Film Festival 2018 - Hilal Award for Best Film

The Distant Barking of Dogs

- Peabody Award 2020
- Danish Producers’ Association, TV-prisen 2020 - Best documentary of the year
- Association of Danish Film Critics, Bodil Awards 2019 - Best Documentary
- Danish Film Academy Award, the Robert, 2019 - Best Documentary
- EBS International Documentary Festival 2018 - Grand Prix
- Göteborg Film Festival 2018 - Dragon Award for Best Nordic Dox

Dreaming Murakami

- Hot Docs 2018 - Audience Award for Best Mid Length Documentary

A Drowning Man

- Dokufest, Kosovo - Best Short (co-winner)
- Valladolid International Film Festival - Silver Spike
- Cork Film Festival - Grand Prix
- Festival International du Film de Bruxelles - Best Short Film
- Dubai International Film Festival - Best Short Film

Land of the Free

- CPH:DOX 2017 - Nordic DOX Award

Les Sauteurs

- Faito Doc Festival 2017 - Prix CPS
- Migranti Film Festival 2017 - Gianmaria Testa Award
- Ethnocineca 2017 - Excellence in Visual Anthropology Award
- Black Movies 2017 - Prix des Jeunes
- Filmweekend Würzberg - 2nd Documentary Price
- Cinema Eye Honors 2017 - Spotlight Award
- Porto/Post/Doc- Honorable Mention
- Docs Against Gravity 2016 - Amnesty International Award
- DMZ Docs, Korea - White Goose Award for best film, Int. Competition
- Salina DOC Fest 2016 - Best Editing Award by The Italian Association of Film and TV Editors, AMC
- Salina DOC Fest 2016 - Premio Tasca d'Almerita
- Porto/Post/Doc - Biberstein Gusmão Award (for emerging directors) to Abou Bakar Sidibé
- Frankfurt Lichter IFF 2016 - Main Award: Int. Feature length Award
- dokKa Karlsruhe, 2016 - Main Prize
- DocumentaMadrid 2016 - The Jury's Second Prize, Feature length Competition
- Hamptons Int. Film Festival - Honorable Mention
- Camden Int. Film Festival- Special Jury Mention
- DOK.fest München 2016- Special Mention
- Berlinale 2016 - Ecumenical Jury Award

Pebbles at Your Door

- Palm Springs International Shortfest - Runner Up Best Documentary

Pervert Park

- Sundance Film Festival 2015 - World Cinema Documentary Special Jury Award for Impact

Far from Home

- Mumbai International Film Festival 2016 - Best Debut Documentary

Life is Sacred

Vilnius IFF Kino Pavasaris 2015 - Audience Award

The Look of Silence

- Acey Artist Choice Award - Best Documentary of 2015
- Acey Artist Choice Award - Best Editing in a Documentary 2015
- Festival d'Angers - Audience Award for Best Film of 2015
- Festival d'Angers- Grand Jury Prize - Special Mention 2015
- Austin Film Critics Association (AFCA) - Best Documentary of 2015
- Beboti Film Awards - Best Foreign Language Film of 2015
- Beboti Film Awards - Best Documentary of 2015
- Berlin Film Festival - Peace Film Prize of 2015
- Bodil Award - Danish Film Critics Association Prize - Best Documentary of 2015
- Boston Society of Film Critics (BSFC) - Best Foreign Language Film of 2015
- Busan International Film Festival - Best World Documentary (Cinephile Prize) 2014
- Burma Human Rights Human Dignity Film Festival - Aung San Suu Kyi Award 2015
- Calgary Underground Film Festival - Jury Awards Best Documentary Feature 2015
- Camerimage Film Festival - Best Documentary of 2015
- CINE Golden Eagle Award - Best Feature Length Documentary of 2015
- Cinema Eye Honors - Outstanding Achievement in Nonfiction Feature Filmmaking 2016
- Cinema Eye Honors - Outstanding Achievement in Direction 2016
- Cinema Eye Honors - Outstanding Achievement in Production 2016
- Central Ohio Film Critics Association - Best Documentary of 2015
- Cologne International Film and Television Festival - Phoenix Prize 2015
- CPH:DOX 2014 - Grand Prize (DOX Award)
- Danish Arts Council - Prize of the Danish Arts Council 2014
- Danish Academy Award (Robert Prize) - Best Documentary of 2015
- DCist - Best Film of 2015
- Denver Film Critics Society - Best Documentary of 2016
- Denver Film Festival - Best Documentary of 2014
- Docs Against Gravity – Warsaw - Amnesty International Award 2015
- Docs Barcelona - Audience Award 2015
- Docs Barcelona - Amnesty International Award 2015
- Docs Barcelona - Best Documentary - Honorable Mention 2015
- Documenta Madrid - Audience Award of 2015
- Durban International Film Festival - Amnesty International Honorary Award 2015
- Festival Cinematográfico del Uruguay - Human Right Best Feature 2015
- Festival de Cine de Derechos Humanos Buenos Aires - Best Film of 2015
- Festival de Cinéma Valenciennes - Grand Prix 2015
- Festival de Cinéma Valenciennes - Prix de la Critique 2015
- Festival de Cinéma Valenciennes - Prix Étudiants 2015
- Gotham Award - Best Documentary of 2015
- Gothenburg International Film Festival - Dragon Award Best Nordic Documentary of 2015
- IDA Documentary Awards - Best Feature Documentary Award 2015
- Independent Spirit Award - Best Documentary of 2015
- Indiewire Critics Poll- Best Documentary of 2015
- Indonesian Alliance of Independent Journalists - Tasrif Award of 2015
- KBPS - Best Film of 2015
- London Critic's Circle Award - Foreign Language Film of the Year 2016
- MakeDox International Filmfestival - Best Film of 2015
- Milwaukee Film Festival - Jury Award Best Documentary of 2015
- Movies That Matter Festival - Vara Audience Award 2015
- Nonfics - Best Documentary of 2015
- Nonfics Critics Poll - Best Documentary of 2015
- NordicDocs - Special Jury Prize 2015
- Nordisk Panorama - Audience Award for Best Film 2015
- Nuremberg Human Rights Film Festival - Award of Honor 2015
- Nuremberg Human Rights Film Festival - Audience Award 2015
- Online Film Critics Society - Best Documentary of 2015
- Prague One World Film Festival - Best Film of 2015
- Realscreen - Best Documentary of 2015
- Ridenhour Documentary Film Prize 2015
- River Run International Film Festival - Best Director (Documentary) 2015
- Satellite Awards - Best Documentary of 2015
- Seattle Film Awards - Best Documentary of 2015
- Sheffield International Documentary Festival - Audience Award 2015
- Sofia International Film Festival - Best Documentary of 2015
- Subversive Film Festival - Wild Dreamer Award 2015
- SXSW Film Festival - Audience Award, Festival Favourites for Best Film 2015
- Toronto Film Critics Society - Best Documentary of 2015
- Tromsø International Film Festival - FICC Award/Don Quixote Prize 2015
- True/False Film Festival - True Life Fund Recipient Award
- Victoria Film Festival - Best Documentary of 2015
- Village Voice Critics Poll - Best Documentary of 2015
- Vilnius International Film Festival - Best Director 2015
- Venice Film Festival - Grand Jury Prize 2014
- Venice Film Festival - Human Rights Award 2014
- Best Film of Venice Film Festival - Critics Price (FIPRESCI) 2014
- Best European and Mediterranean Film of Venice Film Festival 2014 - European Critics Prize (FEDORA) 2014
- Best Film of Venice Film Festival - Online Critics Prize (Mouse d'Oro) 2014
- Zurich Film Festival - Special Mention - International Documentary 2014

Chikara –The Sumo Wrestler’s Son

- Al Jazeera Int. Film Festival 2015 - Winner of Jury Award for Medium Length Films

The Act of Killing

- CPH:DOX 2012 – DOX:AWARD (main competition award)
- Berlin Film Festival 2013 – Panorama Audience Award
- Berlin Film Festival 2013 – Prize of the Ecumenical Jury
- !F Istanbul 2013 – Prize of the SIYAD jury (Turkish Film Critics' Association)
- Danish Film Academy 2013 – Best Feature Documentary
- FICUNAM, Mexico 2013 – Audience Award
- ZagrebDox, 2013 – Movies that Matter Award
- One World, Prague 2013 – Best Film
- Geneva International Human Rights Film Festival 2013 – Gilda Vieira de Mello Prize
- Danish Film Critics Association – Special Prize 2013 (Sær-Bodil)
- Festival de Cinéma Valenciennes 2013 – Grand Prize
- Festival de Cinéma Valenciennes 2013 – Special Mention, Critic's Jury
- IndieLisboa 2013 – Amnesty International Award
- BelDocs 2013 – Grand Prix for Best Film
- DocumentaMadrid 2013 – First Prize of the Jury
- DocumentaMadrid 2013 – Audience Award
- Planete + Doc Warsaw 2013 – Audience Award
- Planete + Doc 2013 – Grand Prix of Lower Silesia
- DocsBarcelona 2013 – Best Film Award (Grand Prize)
- Sheffield Doc/Fest 2013 – Grand Prize
- Biografilm Festival Italy 2013 – Grand Prize
- Grimstad Short and Documentary Film Festival 2013 – Grand Prize
- Royal Anthropological Institute Film Festival 2013 – Basil Wright Prize
- Human Rights, Human Dignity Int. Film Festival Myanmar – Aung San Suu Kyi Award for Best Documentary
- Sheffield Doc/Fest 2013 – Audience Award

The Human Scale

- Aljazeera Int. Documentary Film Festival 2013 – Winner of the Child and Family Award for Long Film
- Planete Doc, Warsaw 2013 – Green Cross Award

The Kid and the Clown

- Aljazeera Int. Documentary Film Festival 2012 – Winner of the Child and Family Award for Medium Categories
- HotDocs 2012 – In competition: Medium Length Documentary
- TRT Documentary Awards 2012 – Winner of the first Special Prize in the International Category
- Kraków Int. Documentary Film Festival 2012 – Winner of the Silver Horn Award for Best Middle-length Documentary
- Pärnu Film Festival 2012 – Winner of Best Film for Kids
