= Signe Byrge Sørensen =

Danish film producer (born 1970)

- Born: 6 March 1970 (age 55)
- Occupation: Film producer

Signe Byrge Sørensen (Danish: [ˈsiːnə ˈpyɐ̯wə ˈsɶɐ̯ˀn̩sn̩]; born 1970) is a Danish film producer. She is the head of and co-founder of the film production company Final Cut for Real in Copenhagen, Denmark. Sørensen and film director Joshua Oppenheimer were nominated for an Academy Award for Best Documentary Feature for the 2013 film The Act of Killing. She was also the producer to the critically acclaimed documentary The Look of Silence. Signe Byrge Sørensen a member of The Academy of Motion Picture Arts and Sciences and the Danish Film Academy. In 2022, she produced the animated documentary film Flee and was nominated in Academy Award for Best Documentary Feature and Best Animated Feature categories.

== Life and career ==
Signe Byrge Sørensen was born in Copenhagen, Denmark, she grew up in Maribo, Denmark. Signe Byrge Sørensen holds an MA in International Development Studies and Communication Studies from Roskilde University, Denmark. She did the European co-production courses EURODOC in 2003, EAVE in 2010 and ACE in 2018.

Signe Byrge Sørensen began producing films in SPOR Media in 1998, moved to Final Cut Productions ApS in 2004 and co-founded Final Cut for Real ApS in 2009 with Anne Köhncke.

In 2007, Signe Byrge Sørensen made contact to American film director Joshua Oppenheimer after seeing a portion of his footage from Indonesia during a seminar at Copenhagen International Documentary Film Festival, CPH:DOX. The two of them began working together creating two documentaries both The Act of Killing and The Look of Silence.

In 2012, The Act of Killing premiered at the Telluride Film Festival and Toronto International Film Festival. It went on to win many prizes worldwide, including the European Film Award for Best Documentary, a Panorama Audience Award, and a Prize of the Ecumenical Jury from the 63rd Berlin International Film Festival. The film also received the Robert Award by the Film Academy of Denmark, a Bodil Award by Denmark's National Association of Film Critics, and the Aung San Suu Kyi Award at the Human Rights Human Dignity International Film Festival 2013.

The Act of Killing won the BAFTA for Best Documentary, European Film Award for Best Documentary, the Asia Pacific Screen Award for Best Documentary, and was nominated for Best Documentary Feature at the 86th Academy Awards.

Signe Byrge Sørensen's next film with Joshua Oppenheimer The Look of Silence from 2014 is a companion piece to The Act of Killing. This production was nominated for Best Documentary Feature at the 88th Academy Awards. It was screened in competition at the 71st Venice International Film Festival and won the Grand Jury Prize, the International Film Critics Award (FIPRESCI), the Italian online critics award (Mouse d'Oro), the European Film Critics Award (F.E.D.E.O.R.A.) for the Best Film of Venezia 71, as well as the Human Rights Nights Award. Since then, it has gone on to win a further 70 international awards, including an Independent Spirit Award, an IDA Award for Best Documentary, a Gotham Award for Best Documentary.

Signe Byrge Sørensen was nominated for the PGA Award for Best Documentary in 2016 for The Look of Silence. Signe Byrge Sørensen won Cinema Eye Honors awards for the production of both The Act of Killing and The Look of Silence. Together with Joshua Oppenheimer she was the first to win this award twice.

In 2014, Signe Byrge Sørensen received Denmark’s most prestigious award in documentary filmmaking, the Roos Prize. and the Danish Directors’ Guild’s Ib Prize in 2016.

Signe Byrge Sørensen was in 2020 stated as the most powerful documentary producer in Denmark in a survey produced by the Danish national newspaper Politiken. Signe Byrge Sørensen lives in Copenhagen, Denmark.

In 2021, the film Flee - produced by Monica Hellström and Signe Byrge Sørensen - had its world premiere at the 2021 Sundance Film Festival on January 28, 2021, where it won the Grand Jury Prize in the World Cinema Documentary section. At the same festival the documentary President - produced by Signe Byrge Sørensen and directed by Camilla Nielsson - won Special Jury Prize for Verité Filmmaking.

== Filmography (selected) ==
- Flee (2021)
- President (2021)
- Songs of Repression (2020)
- A Comedian in a Syrian Tragedy (2019)
- Dreaming Murakami (2017)
- A Drowning Man (2017)
- Land of the Free (2017)
- Les Sauteurs (2016)
- The Dvor Massacre (2015)
- Pervert Park (2014)
- The Look of Silence (2014)
- Life is Sacred (2014)
- The Act of Killing (2012)
- The Human Scale (2012)
- The Kid & The Clown (2011)
- In Languages We Live / Voices of the World, (2005), producer and co-director
- The Importance of Being MLABRI (2007), producer and co-director
- Everlasting Moments (2008), post production producer
- Football is God (2010)
