= The Act of Killing =

2012 documentary by Joshua Oppenheimer

- Theatrical release poster
- Directed by: Joshua Oppenheimer, Anonymous (co-director), Christine Cynn (co-director)
- Produced by: Signe Byrge Sørensen; Joram ten Brink; Anonymous; Christine Cynn; Anne Köhncke; Joshua Oppenheimer; Michael Uwemedimo
- Starring: Anwar Congo; Herman Koto; Syamsul Arifin; Ibrahim Sinik; Japto Soerjosoemarno; Safit Pardede; Jusuf Kalla; Adi Zulkadry; Soaduon Siregar; Marzuki; Anif Shah; Rahmat Shah; Sakhyan Asmara
- Cinematography: Carlos Arango de Montis; Lars Skree; Anonymous
- Edited by: Niels Pagh Andersen; Janus Billeskov Jansen; Mariko Montpetit; Ariadna Fatjó-Vilas Mestre; Charlotte Munch Bengtsen; Erik Andersson
- Music by: Elin Øyen Vister
- Production companies: Final Cut for Real; DK Film
- Distributed by: Danish Film Institute (Denmark); Dogwoof Pictures (UK)
- Release dates: 31 August 2012 (Telluride); 1 November 2012 (Indonesia)
- Running time: 122 minutes 167 minutes (director's cut)
- Countries: Denmark; Indonesia; Norway; United Kingdom
- Language: Indonesian
- Budget: $1 million
- Box office: $722,714

The Act of Killing (Indonesian: Jagal, lit. 'Butcher') is a 2012 documentary film directed by Joshua Oppenheimer, with Christine Cynn and an anonymous Indonesian co-directing. The film follows individuals who participated in the Indonesian mass killings of 1965–66, wherein alleged communists and people opposed to the New Order regime were tortured and killed, with the killers, many becoming gangsters, still in power throughout the country. The film was mostly filmed in Medan, North Sumatra, following the executioner Anwar Congo and his acquaintances as they, upon Oppenheimer's request, re-enact their killings and talk about their actions openly, also following Congo's psychological journey facing the topic.

A co-production between Denmark, Indonesia, Norway, and the United Kingdom, it is presented by Final Cut for Real in Denmark and produced by Signe Byrge Sørensen, with Werner Herzog, Errol Morris, Joram ten Brink and André Singer in executive producer roles. The film was conceived following Oppenheimer and Cynn's Indonesian documentary film The Globalisation Tapes (2003), which depicted survivors of the killings, who ideated The Act of Killing. They interviewed 40 people who were unexpectedly boastful about their actions, before taking an interest in Congo in 2005. Filming occurred up to 2011 with an Indonesian team largely credited as anonymous. Oppenheimer described the process as taking a toll on their mental health. The film was edited by a team of four.

The Act of Killing premiered on 31 August 2012 at the Telluride Film Festival in the United States, which was followed by more festival and theatrical screenings up to 2014. The initial releases used a 120-minute cut, with the 2013 television airings trimming it further up to 95 minutes. Due to its positive reception, the 160-minute director's cut, previously only shown in Indonesia, was released for international audiences. The Indonesian release began on 1 November 2012 secretly, but public releases were later seen, and popularity spiked in the country too. It was later released for free online only for people in Indonesia. The film received widespread acclaim from critics for its method in tackling the subject, blending surrealism with realism. It features in several critic's lists of the best films of the 21st century and of the best documentaries ever made, and has earned various accolades including a British Academy Film Award.

The film has become subject to scholarly analysis regarding documentary filmmaking, and the mass killings itself. It has also helped catalyse a wide conversation regarding the events in Indonesia, with the reality of what happened more known, especially with the Western world's direct involvement. In China, the film sparked outrage due to the depiction of the gangsters extorting money from Chinese Indonesians. The Indonesian government has not given positive responses, claiming that it is a misleading portrayal of the country's history. A spiritual successor, The Look of Silence, was released in 2014; it depicts the family of a victim as they encounter the killers and understand further on what happened.

== Summary ==
Following the 1965 30 September Movement, Indonesian president Sukarno was overthrown by General Suharto. A key event in the transition to the New Order was the killing of over a million alleged communists between 1965 and 1966, including Sukarno's supporters, members of the Communist Party of Indonesia, labor and farming unions, intellectuals, and Chinese Indonesians. Backed by Western governments, the paramilitary groups and preman gangsters responsible for the massacres, the biggest being the Pancasila Youth, gained power in Indonesia.

The Act of Killing is directed by Joshua Oppenheimer, who with his crew in Medan, asks some of the gangsters to re-enact their killings. The film's first subjects, Anwar Congo and Herman Koto, used to sell black market tickets outside of a cinema. During the rise of communism, American films were restricted, and with no income they began working for a death squad as part of the genocide. Inspired by film noir films, killing methods include strangulation, stabbing, and throwing people into rivers. Congo estimates that he has killed as many as 1,000 people. The Pancasila Youth openly brag about their role in the massacres on television and express their intention to further curb the spread of "neocommunism" and far-leftism in Indonesia, and is backed by high-ranking government members, including then-vice president Jusuf Kalla. The ethnic Chinese who were not killed continue to have their money extorted by the gangsters.

Adi Zulkadry, a friend and past collaborator of Congo and participant in the genocide, discusses Pengkhianatan G30S/PKI (1984), a propaganda film that pushes the notion the 30 September Movement was perpetrated by the communists, and glorifies the genocide. While Congo praises the film for validating his acts, Zulkadry is sceptical of its plot and deems the genocide cruel. In a discussion with Oppenheimer, he denies it being a war crime, as the same holds true for the Iraq War and the Native American genocide in the United States. Congo then details his nightmares following the genocide, where he would envision the spirits of his victims. Zulkadry, who felt no remorse, downplays it as nerve issues. Ibrahim Sinik and Soduaon Siregar, journalists of Medan Pos who covered the genocide, show support but deny direct participation.

Koto runs in the 2009 Indonesian legislative election as a candidate from the Workers and Employers Party intending to extort locals once in office, but is easily defeated. Many high-ranking government officials are also leaders of Pancasila Youth factions, allowing them to commit corruption, rig elections, and clear land for developers. The group earns income in the modern era through criminal activities like gambling and drug smuggling. The film also depicts their sexual objectification of women; members boast about raping teenage girls and Gerwani members during the massacres.

During the re-enactments, titled Arsan dan Aminah, some of the gangsters including Zulkadry express caution so as to not potentially destroy their reputation as heroes. While it initially centers on the killings, Congo then discusses his nightmares more. After filming the Pancasila Youth members chant their spirit in killing communists, they continue to a scene where the alleged communist families are tortured, with their houses burnt. Seeing the crying children, Congo expresses pity, which turns to terror as he portrays a victim in another scene, causing him to undergo a panic attack as he senses what his victims felt. Feeling remorse, he returns to a place where he frequently killed people, retching at his own reminiscing.

== Production ==
=== Filming ===
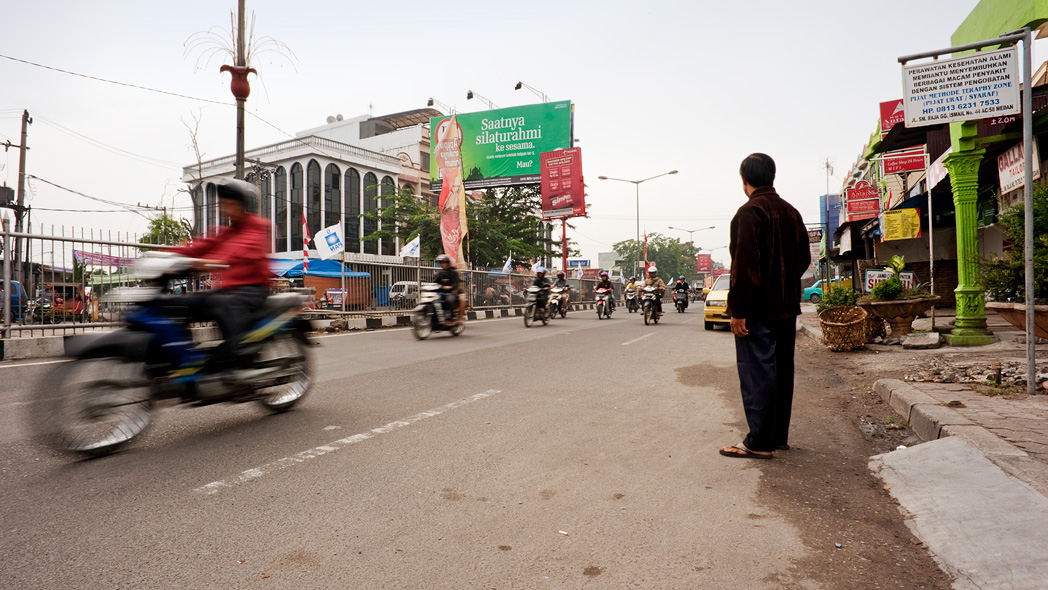
The film was mostly filmed in Medan (pictured 2009)

The Act of Killing came to be when Oppenheimer and co-director Christine Cynn went to a Belgian-owned palm plantation nearby Medan, where the female workers were asked to spray herbicide without adequate protective equipment; the film that came out of it, The Globalisation Tapes (2003), documents their worries on making a union against the system because their grandparents were alleged pro-communists killed during the genocide. As focus on the genocide was apparent, people in the military often confiscated their equipment and detained the duo. Before they could leave Indonesia, the workers suggested that they film the genocide's perpetrators. Despite their initial caution, the people they met were blatantly proud of their actions. Starting in late 2004 with the help of death squad leader Amir Hasan, they were able to contact many of his kind, moving up the ranks of those involved, including retired military officers in capital city Jakarta and two retired officers of the Central Intelligence Agency in the United States, and met Congo in Medan in 2005 as his 41st interviewee. The film's Indonesian co-director began working in 2004 with a one-month goal, but eventually stuck throughout the entire process.

The film was shot mostly between 2005 and 2011. In several interviews, Oppenheimer described his feeling listening to the perpetrators as if "I'd wandered into Germany 40 years after the Holocaust only to find the Nazis still in power". It took filming around five or ten subjects that Oppenheimer could openly discuss the genocide, and when he ideated that he would let them re-enact their acts while filming their thoughts on it "to create perhaps a new form of documentary, a kind of documentary of the imagination". The subjects understood that the re-enactments will not be a separate film, and have signed forms indicating such. Congo was a particular point of interest to Oppenheimer because he "could see his pain", believing that Congo's openness to his acts were in response to self-soothing his trauma, trying to deny any wrongdoing. Because different death squads within Pancasila Youth dislike each other, the film only depicts Congo's squad (Pasukan Kodok) to avoid conflicts. Henceforth, he met Koto, Zulkadry, and Sinik; as a filmmaker and Anwar's killing advisor, Sinik gave input on the re-enactments.

Oppenheimer handled half of the cinematography, with Lars Skree, Carlos Arango de Montis, and the Indonesian co-director doing the rest. He let the killers use the cameras to document the behind-the-scenes process of their re-enactments. Long takes were preferred to depict entire events, and the crew would not speak much as it records. The entire behind-the-scenes process of the re-enactments were thus filmed to further accommodate the film's investigative comprehensiveness. Dailies of the re-enactments were shown to the subjects as soon as possible, hence the reaction scenes in the film. The gangster re-enactment's set was based upon the actual office where the murders occurred, and was entirely improvised. The goldfish sculpture seen prominently throughout the film was a former restaurant that closed in 1997; it was filmed last and represents Congo's ambiguous fever dream.

Filmed in 2009, the re-enactments were funded by the filmmakers, but some scenes were made by Congo's squad, with production values Oppenheimer called "awful". Because Oppenheimer's crew had no experience with fiction, they consulted Congo for authenticity. The "high production values" allowed for the re-enactments to level the non-fiction scenes, so that by the final act of The Act of Killing, the re-enactments can dominate: "it stops really being a documentary at all, and becomes a kind of fever dream" from Anwar's mind. The sound was edited at the soap opera studio of TVRI, Indonesia's state television network also dominated by gangsters. The reason Koto was given feminine costume was because his theater "group was like the Globe Theatre [...], all the roles were played by men, and Herman always played the women's roles." The scene where Congo's neighbor admitted that his stepfather was killed was not on Oppenheimer and his Indonesian co-director's attention as they were changing tapes; Oppenheimer expressed regret for missing out on it and allowing the neighbors’ portrayal as a tortured victim. The guilt caused the neighbor to have a breakdown. The unnamed neighbor died two years after filming.

Amid filming, Oppenheimer traveled to Jakarta to show the videos filmed thus far to genocide survivors and human rights advocates, who deemed his findings important and crucial to continue on. They also frequently delivered dailies and transcripts of it to National Human Rights Commissioner Stanley Prasetyo, who helped with interview ideas. Zulkadry's came midway through filming, with the Indonesian production manager having met him previously in Jakarta. Oppenheimer's vision for the film changed with his arrival, who openly condemned the killings but also expressed caution on the re-enactment's potential in reshaping Indonesian history. During one of the scenes, Zulkadry asked for the film to be discontinued, alleging that Oppenheimer is a communist. With the Indonesian crew in fear, Oppenheimer refuted Adi's claims. He felt traumatized by the overall filming and at one point collapsed in exhaustion; he would often return to London healing from nightmares and insomnia. It stemmed from a re-enactment where Congo mutilates a teddy bear symbolizing a girl, then telling Koto, "you tried to bribe me with your daughter. See? You're the barbaric one, not me." (Note: Original: "Ini adalah satu tingkah yang biasanya buat orang yang ingin menyuap dengan anaknya. [...] Yang sebenarnya kamu lebih biadab.")

The Indonesian crew also faced similar emotions which they faced by bonding with each other, though some stepped down midway through filming. As the filming progresses, Oppenheimer could be more open on his perspectives with Zulkadry, who he deems hypocritical, and Congo. He and Congo had bonded during filming; during the mutilation re-enactment, Congo noticed him crying and asking if they must stop. Thus, when Congo retched in the penultimate scene, Oppenheimer chose not to reassure him so as to not be "dishonest"; instead he told him the film he envisioned to release, to which Congo responded (translated by Oppenheimer), "Okay, if that's what it is, I understand, I'm not angry, I want to see it." Oppenheimer gave him a DVD "when it's safe to do so". Richard Whittaker of The Austin Chronicle concluded that in creating the film, he "paid a psychic toll".

=== Post-filming ===
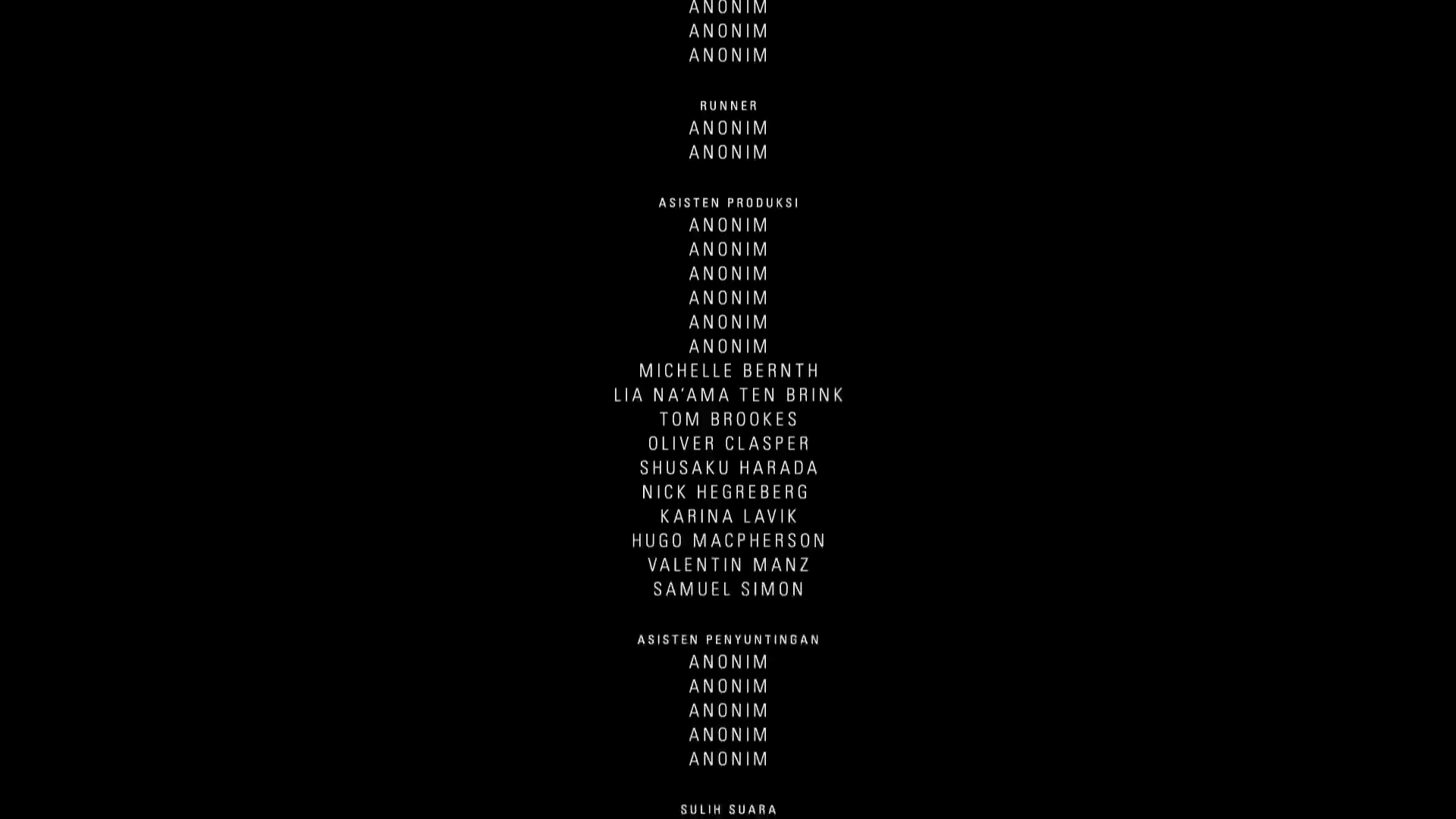
Indonesians who participated in the film were credited as "Anonymous" ("Anonim" in Indonesian) out of fear of legal and extrajudicial punishments.

Filmmakers Werner Herzog and Errol Morris were credited as executive producers for The Act of Killing. At an airport in London, another executive producer André Singer directed Oppenheimer to Herzog, whom he has also worked with, to preview eight minutes of the film; he immediately displayed interest. Several months later, Herzog via telephone was angered by Oppenheimer trying to shorten the film, intendedly to make it accessible for a wide audience and film festivals. He then agreed on the trimming, but assisted editing so as to not remove crucial elements (he marked scenes by three levels of importance), and analyzed three or four rough cuts with Oppenheimer. Herzog constantly reassured the worried Oppenheimer about the quality of the film. Morris, meanwhile, had known Oppenheimer for 20 years, and had already seen the early clips circa 2010.

The editing team was led by Niels Pagh Andersen, accompanied by Charlotte Munch Bengtsen, Ariadna Fatjó-Vilas Mestre, Janus Billeskov Jansen, and Mariko Montpetit, using the software Final Cut Pro. Oppenheimer worked with two "junior editors" for a year sifting through 35 hours of footage selected from 1,000 hours, when Andersen joined midway; they then established Congo as the main subject, thus revolving his psychological journey throughout the film. He and Oppenheimer agreed that Anwar represents hope and honesty, whereas characters like Zulkadry represents denial. Oppenheimer himself wanted the film to depict his bravery to speak up, while also not ignoring his history. In order to give an air of humanism around him, footage of the genocide survivors was omitted to not dilute the evil feel. A three-hour rough cut was then finished in Copenhagen, Denmark. Color grading was done by Tom Chr. Lilletvedt, who also did the visual effects with Christopher Berge Hove. The budget totalled at €1,373,380.

Many of the Indonesians who worked on the film are not credited by name, instead appearing as "Anonymous", for fear of legal and extrajudicial punishment for their participation. This was by their request, which Oppenheimer respected; he also said he is open to them requesting letters of recommendation. The Indonesian co-director noted that his fellow filmmaker friend was once questioned by a state official, who admitted making efforts to try uncover his identity. His ties with The Act of Killing is only known to friends, family, as well as several journalists and filmmakers. Oppenheimer hoped that the climate surrounding the genocide can get better so that the film can be re-released with the Indonesian crew properly credited.

== Release ==
=== Outside Indonesia ===
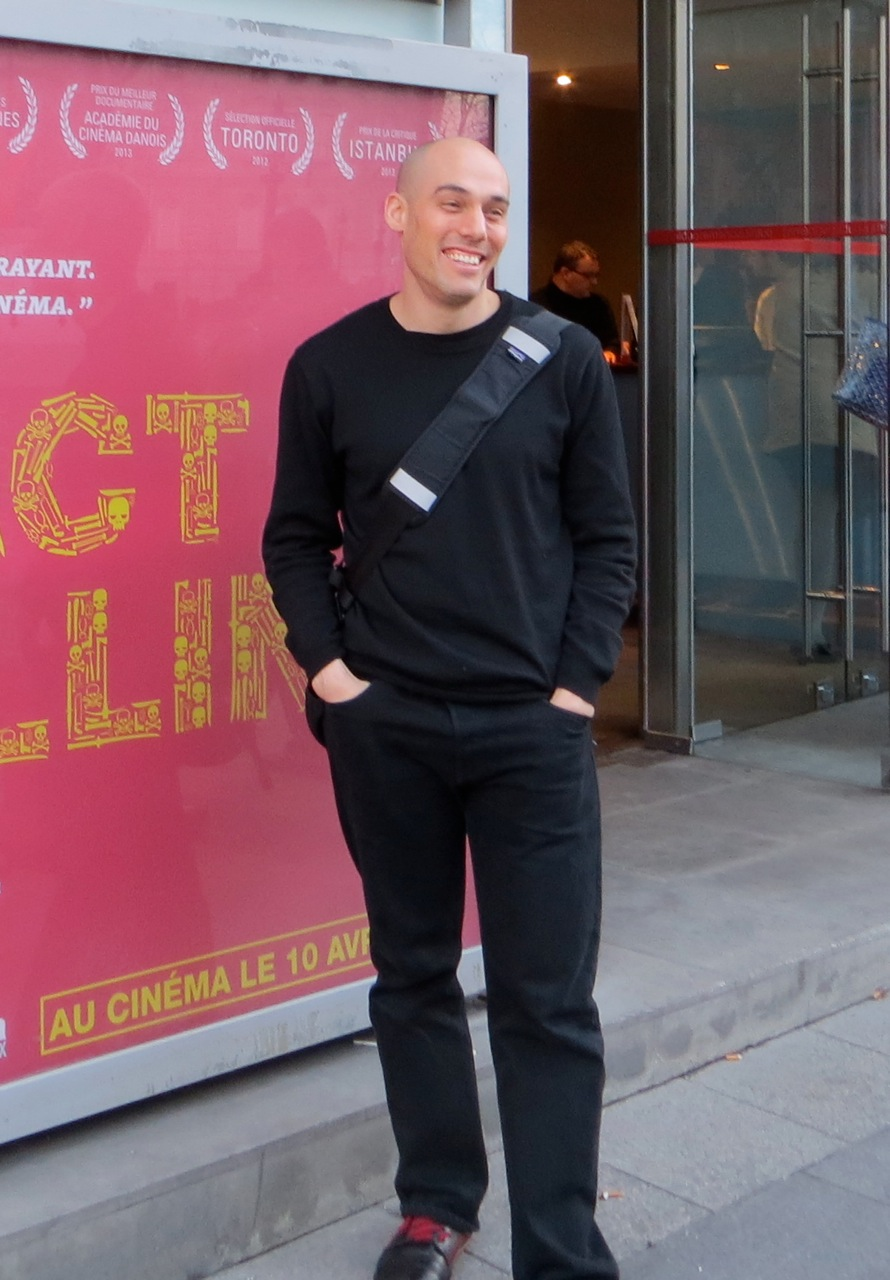
Joshua Oppenheimer at the French premiere for The Act of Killing

The Act of Killing premiered at the Telluride Film Festival in the United States on 31 August 2012, which was quickly followed by a screening in September at the Toronto International Film Festival in Canada. The film's initial festival circuit and subsequent American theatrical release by Drafthouse Films used a 120-minute cut by editor Jansen. Dogwoof acquired rights for the United Kingdom. In late 2013, television networks began airing the film in a shorter 95-minute duration. Oppenheimer stated that despite lamenting how the shorter cuts meant less character depth, he wanted the film's contents to be seen by Western audiences: "What cinemas are going to take a 2-hour-and-40-minute experimental documentary about genocide in Indonesia that no one's ever heard about?" Following the positive reception, it was decided that the 160-minute director's cut be released.

In the week ending 14 April 2013 in France, the film earned $10,320. It screened up to 5 June, with an additional 13,396 audiences. Meanwhile, in Germany, Spain, and the United Kingdom, it earned $440, $61,258 ($11,413 in its opening weekend), and $163,777, respectively. For the US, its opening weekend on 21 July 2013 earned $27,450 in one theatre, earning 57th place. The most significant increase was in the week ending 15 September, when it earned an additional $22,468 in 19 theatres, a 359.1% increase from the previous weekend. It continued to see moderate changes up to 2 March 2014, though had a 272% increase in the week ending 9 February, when it earned $3,612 from 20-theatre screenings. Thus within the US, it earned $484,221. Cumulating all these figures, the film earned $725,324. Meanwhile, a 2016 re-release in Thailand from 11 to 21 February earned $3,610.

Drafthouse then released the theatrical and director's cuts on a Region 1/A-locked DVD and Blu-ray, whose special features include an audio commentary by Oppenheimer and Herzog, an interview with Oppenheimer on Democracy Now!, interviews with Herzog and Morris by Vice News, and four deleted scenes. The scenes respectively depict Congo preparing to act as a victim, him and Zulkadry criticising corruption, a deputy minister praising Pancasila Youth, and Sinik claiming to be a humanist but saying that Oppenheimer might have been killed during the mass killings. The packaging comes with an essay by Morris titled "The Murders of Gonzango", connecting the killings to the Vietnam War, which the US also incited. Dogwoof also released the DVD and Blu-ray with the same special features, but is Region 2/B-locked for the UK and Ireland.

=== Indonesia ===
Because of the heated political climate in Indonesia, it is highly risky to submit The Act of Killing, titled Jagal in Indonesian, to the Film Censorship Board, since the probability of it being banned would mean Indonesians can face charges for watching the film, and allowing paramilitary groups to heckle screenings. The film premiered in the country, screened by the National Commission on Human Rights (Komnas HAM) throughout late 2012 for filmmakers, authors, advocates, educators, and organizations for the genocide survivors. The positive reception prompted the assembly of a campaign team by some of them in collaboration with the film's production company Final Cut for Real. Any members of the general public were permitted to screen the film limitlessly with a copy provided by the team.

On 10 December, coinciding Human Rights Day, screenings were held in at least 50 venues across 30 cities, with an estimated 30 to 600 audiences per theatre. The venues ranged from a large multiplex theatre in Jakarta and universities, to the victims' mass grave and an isolated jungle. The only screening that stopped midway was in Central Java upon police demand; another close call was committed by paramilitary groups. When a news editor published an article titled "World Condemns Pancasila Youth", 500 members of the gang stormed the office and beat up the general manager. However three months later, some of the Pancasila Youth attended a screening and discussed about it without wreaking havoc.

Between May and August 2013, 1,096 DVD copies were distributed to 118 cities in 29 provinces. On 17 August 2013 (Independence Day), 45 screenings were publicly held. On 30 September 2013, the day of commemorating the genocide, the film was given rights to be released online for free only for Indonesian viewers. Apart from word of mouth among public figures, Twitter was also credited to its popularity: nearing Independence Day, the amount of tweets mentioning The Act of Killing spiked up to 12,000 tweets, and mentions of "Indonesian killing" and "Indonesian death squad" also saw slight increase. The total budget for the Indonesian campaign totalled up to €53,841. The film was then made available on YouTube on 17 December.

== Reception ==
=== Critical response ===
The Act of Killing received widespread acclaim from critics. The review aggregator website Rotten Tomatoes reported a 95% approval rating with an average rating of 8.8/10 based on 163 reviews. The website's consensus reads, "Raw, terrifying, and painfully difficult to watch, The Act of Killing offers a haunting testament to the edifying, confrontational power of documentary cinema." On Metacritic, the film holds an average score of 92 out of 100, based on 34 reviews, indicating "universal acclaim".

Nick Schager of The Village Voice called it a "masterpiece". Pulitzer Prize-winning journalist Chris Hedges called the film "an important exploration of the complex psychology of mass murderers" and wrote that "it is not the demonized, easily digestible caricature of a mass murderer that most disturbs us. It is the human being." Award-winning filmmaker Ruhi Hamid said: "It is the most extraordinary film I have ever seen. It actually turns around what we think of as documentaries. ...an extraordinary record of a horrendous part of Indonesian history."

Nick Fraser, a British documentary producer and journalist, called The Act of Killing a "snuff film," rebuking it and urging others not to give the film an Oscar. He goes on to express his strong dislike for the "moral premise" of the documentary asking, "How badly do we want to hear from these people, after all? Wouldn't it be better if we were told something about the individuals whose lives they took?"

In some quarters, Oppenheimer has been accused of treating his subjects in bad faith. As far as their goal at the beginning was to glorify mass murder, Oppenheimer responds that could never have been his goal, therefore that side of them may have been betrayed. In an interview with The Village Voice, Oppenheimer said: "When I was entrusted by this community of survivors to film these justifications, to film these boastings, I was trying to expose and interrogate the nature of impunity. Boasting about killing was the right material to do that with because it is a symptom of impunity."

Australian National University Professor of Asian History and Politics Robert Cribb stated that the film lacks historical context. In reply, Oppenheimer said that "the film is essentially not about what happened in 1965, but rather about a regime in which genocide has, paradoxically, been effaced [yet] celebrated – in order to keep the survivors terrified, the public brainwashed, and the perpetrators able to live with themselves... It never pretends to be an exhaustive account of the events of 1965. It seeks to understand the impact of the killing and terror today, on individuals and institutions."

Bradley Simpson, historian at the University of Connecticut and director of the Indonesia/East Timor Documentation Project at the National Security Archive, states the "brilliant Oscar-nominated film" has prompted vigorous debate among Indonesians about the crimes and the need to hold responsible parties accountable, and suggests that it could have a similar effect in the United States, whose own role in the killings "has never officially been acknowledged, much less accounted for, though some of the relevant documents have been made available to the public."

An Indonesian academic, Soe Tjen Marching, analyzed the film in relation to Hannah Arendt's theory of the banality of evil.

The primary subjects in the film, Anwar Congo and Herman Koto, have seen the film and neither feels deceived, according to Oppenheimer. Oppenheimer says that upon watching the film Anwar Congo "started to cry...Tearfully, he told me: 'This is the film I expected. It's an honest film, a true film.' He said he was profoundly moved and will always remain loyal to it." Oppenheimer went on to say that in the call with Congo he also became down on himself saying "There is nothing left for me to do in life but to die". Oppenheimer seeing Congo so moved and almost ashamed for what he had done, said this to him. "You're only 70 years old, Anwar. You might live another 25 years. Whatever good you do in those years is not undermined by the awful things in your past." He felt it may have been cliche, but he felt it was honest and all he could manage to say to Congo. A subsequent interview on Al Jazeera's program 101 East revealed that Anwar had misgivings about the film and the negative reaction to it in Indonesia, which was causing problems for him. He confided these concerns directly to Oppenheimer in an apparent Skype conversation displayed within the program.

In 2015, the film was named as one of the top 50 films of the decade so far by Peter Bradshaw of The Guardian. In June 2025, it ranked number 82 on The New York Times' list of "The 100 Best Movies of the 21st Century" and was one of the films voted for the "Readers' Choice" edition of the list, finishing at number 182. In July 2025, it ranked number 20 on Rolling Stone's list of "The 100 Best Movies of the 21st Century."

=== Top ten lists ===
The Act of Killing has been named as one of the best films of 2013 by various critics:

- 1st – Sight & Sound
- 1st – The Guardian
- 1st – LA Weekly
- 1st – Nick Schager, The A.V. Club
- 2nd – Mark Kermode, The Observer
- 3rd – David Edelstein, New York
- 3rd – David Sexton, London Evening Standard
- 4th – Eric Kohn, Indiewire
- 4th – People Magazine
- 7th – Bill Goodykoontz, Arizona Republic
- 7th – A. A. Dowd, The A.V. Club
- 7th – David Chen, slashfilm.com
- 8th – Sam Adams, The A.V. Club
- 8th – Ignatiy Vishnevetsky, The A.V. Club
- 8th – Richard Corliss, Time
- 10th – Time Out London
- 10th – Devindra Hardawar, slashfilm.com

The Act of Killing was ranked 19th among all documentaries ever made in a 2015 poll by the British Film Institute, as well as the 14th greatest film since 2000 in a 2016 critics' poll by BBC. It was ranked 16th in The Guardian's Best Films of the 21st Century list.

=== Awards and nominations ===
The Act of Killing won the 2013 European Film Award for Best Documentary, the Asia Pacific Screen Award, and was nominated for the Academy Award for Best Documentary Feature at the 86th Academy Awards. It also won best documentary at the 67th British Academy Film Awards. In accepting, Oppenheimer said that the United States and the United Kingdom have "collective responsibility" for "participating in and ignoring" the crimes, which was omitted from the video BAFTA posted online. This participation has been extensively documented by numerous professional historians, journalists and an international tribunal, and documents declassified in 2021 indicate that the UK was even more closely involved than previously thought. After a screening for US Congress members, Oppenheimer demanded that the US acknowledge its role in the killings.

== See also ==
- 40 Years of Silence: An Indonesian Tragedy (2009)
- List of films with longest production time
- The Jakarta Method
