= Joshua Oppenheimer =

American and British filmmaker (born 1974)

- Oppenheimer in 2024
- Born: Joshua Lincoln Oppenheimer; September 23, 1974 (age 52); Austin, Texas, U.S.
- Citizenship: United States; United Kingdom; Denmark
- Education: Harvard College (B.A.); Central Saint Martins (Ph.D.)
- Occupation: Film director
- Years active: 1995–present
- Notable work: The Act of Killing; The Look of Silence; The End
- Awards: MacArthur Fellowship; Marshall Scholarship; BAFTA; European Film Award; Grand Jury Prize (Venice Film Festival)

Joshua Lincoln Oppenheimer (born September 23, 1974) is an American and British film director. He directed the Oscar-nominated films The Act of Killing (2012) and The Look of Silence (2014), as well as his 2024 narrative debut, The End. Oppenheimer was a 1997 Marshall Scholar and a 2014 recipient of the MacArthur fellowship.

== Life and career ==
Oppenheimer was born to a Jewish family, in Austin, Texas, and grew up in and around Washington, D.C., and Santa Fe, New Mexico. He received a Bachelor of Arts (BA) summa cum laude in film-making from Harvard University and a PhD from Central Saint Martins College of Art and Design, University of the Arts London, while studying on a Marshall Scholarship. At Harvard, he co-founded AFARM: The Association for the Absence of Rabid Moralism. He is Professor of Film at the University of Westminster.

Early in his career, Oppenheimer pursued "infiltration-based creative practices" to produce short films. In his second short film, These Places We've Learned to Call Home (1996), he infiltrated a militia group as "an alien abductee."

His first film The Entire History of the Louisiana Purchase (1997) won a Gold Hugo from the Chicago International Film Festival (1998).

From 2003 to 2012, he directed and produced a series of films in Indonesia. He first travelled to Indonesia to create a film for the International Union of Food and Agricultural Workers, which would later become The Globalisation Tapes (2003). His interactions with plantation workers inspired him to pursue his first feature film. His debut feature film about the individuals who participated in the Indonesian mass killings of 1965–66, The Act of Killing (2012), premiered at the 2012 Telluride Film Festival. It went on to win many prizes worldwide, including the European Film Award for Best Documentary, a Panorama Audience Award, and a Prize of the Ecumenical Jury from the 63rd Berlin International Film Festival. The film also received the Robert Award by the Film Academy of Denmark, a Bodil Award by Denmark's National Association of Film Critics, and the Aung San Suu Kyi Award at the Human Rights Human Dignity International Film Festival 2013. Oppenheimer appeared on The Daily Show on August 13, 2013, to talk about The Act of Killing.

The Act of Killing won the BAFTA for Best Documentary, European Film Award for Best Documentary, the Asia Pacific Screen Award for Best Documentary, and was nominated for Best Documentary Feature at the 86th Academy Awards.

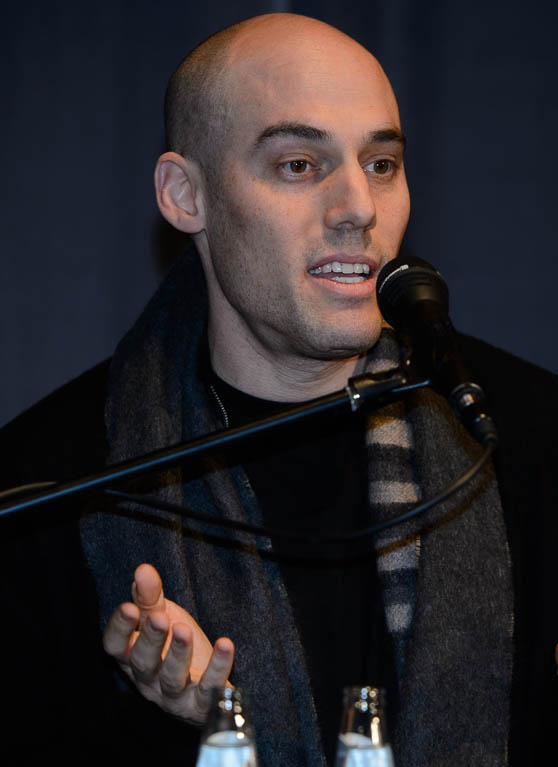
Oppenheimer in 2015

Oppenheimer's next film, The Look of Silence (2014), is a companion piece to The Act of Killing. It was nominated for Best Documentary Feature at the 88th Academy Awards. It was screened in competition at the 71st Venice International Film Festival and won the Grand Jury Prize, the International Film Critics Award (FIPRESCI), the Italian online critics award (Mouse d'Oro), the European Film Critics Award (F.E.D.E.O.R.A.) for the Best Film of Venezia 71, as well as the Human Rights Nights Award. Since then, it has gone on to win a further 70 international awards, including an Independent Spirit Award, an IDA Award for Best Documentary, a Gotham Award for Best Documentary, and three Cinema Eye Honors, including Best Film and Best Director. Cinema Eye Honors named him a decade-defining filmmaker in 2016, and both his films as decade-defining films.

In a 2015 interview with The New York Times, Oppenheimer stated that the West shares "a great deal" of responsibility for the mass killings in Indonesia, noting in particular that "the United States provided the special radio system so the Army could coordinate the killings over the vast archipelago. A man named Bob Martens, who worked at the United States Embassy in Jakarta, was compiling lists of thousands of names of Indonesian public figures who might be opposed to the new regime and handed these lists over to the Indonesian government." In 2014, after a screening of The Act of Killing for US Congress members, Oppenheimer called on the US to acknowledge its role in the killings. In October 2017, the U.S. government declassified thousands of files related to the killings, with officials citing the impact of Oppenheimer's films.

In July 2016, he was named as a member of the main competition jury for the 73rd Venice International Film Festival. In September 2017 he was the guest director for the Telluride Film Festival.

In 2021, film production company Neon announced Oppenheimer would direct a narrative feature film, a post-apocalyptic musical titled The End. The film was inspired by a visit to the Czech Republic, in which he accompanied "an oil tycoon who was looking to purchase a doomsday bunker." The film premiered at the 51st Telluride Film Festival on 31 August 2024, and was screened in the Special Presentations program at the Toronto International Film Festival on 6 September 2024.

Oppenheimer is a signatory of the Film Workers for Palestine boycott pledge that was published in September 2025.

== Personal life ==
Oppenheimer lives in Malmö, Sweden. He is married to Shusaku Harada, a Japanese writer.

He backed Payback Time, a climate change initiative targeted at oil and gas companies during the 2024 United Nations Climate Change Conference.

== Filmmaking style and influence ==
In his early works, Oppenheimer infiltrated multiple organisations and used recordings and interviews as footage for his short films.

Harvard Film Archive called his style in The Entire History of the Louisiana Purchase (2003) as combining "faux and real documentary."

He has called his first two feature films "documentaries of the imagination."

In The Act of Killing (2012), he intentionally avoided close-up shots, stating that "the space – haunted as it is by the absence of the dead – is just as important as listening to whatever Anwar is going to tell us."

== Filmography ==
Year	Title	Notes
1995	Hugh	Short film
1996	These Places We've Learned to Call Home	Short
1997	The Challenge of Manufacturing	Short
1997	The Entire History of the Louisiana Purchase	Short
2003	The Globalisation Tapes	A collaboration between the Independent Plantation Workers' Union of Sumatra, the International Union of Food and Agricultural Workers (IUF), and Vision Machine (Christine Cynn, Joshua Oppenheimer, Michael Uwemedimo, Andrea Luka Zimmerman). He was the producer.
2003	A Brief History of Paradise as Told by the Cockroaches	Short
2003	Market Update	Short
2004	Postcard from Sun City, Arizona	Short
2004	Muzak: a tool of management	Short
2007	Show of Force	Installation
2012	The Act of Killing	Documentary film
2014	The Look of Silence	Documentary
2024	The End	Musical

== Books ==
- Acting on AIDS: Sex, Drugs & Politics (Acting on AIDS). London & New York: Serpent's Tail, 1997, ISBN 1-85242-553-9, ISBN 978-1-85242-553-1. (With Helena Reckitt, co-editor.)
- Going through the motions and becoming other. (With Michael Uwemedimo, co-author). In: Chanan, Michael, (ed.) Visible evidence. Wallflower Press, 2007. London, UK. (In Press)
- History and Histrionics: Vision Machine's Digital Poetics. (With Michael Uwemedimo, co-author). In: Marchessault, Janine, and Lord, Susan, (eds.) Fluid screens, expanded cinema. University of Toronto Press, 2007, Toronto, Canada, pp. 167–183. ISBN 978-0-8020-9297-7.
- Show of force: a cinema-séance of power and violence in Sumatra's plantation belt. (With Michael Uwemedimo, co-author). In Critical Quarterly, Volume 51, No 1, April 2009, pp. 84–110. Edited by: Colin MacCabe. Blackwell Publishing, 2009. ISSN 0011-1562.
- Killer Images: Documentary Film, Memory and the Performance of Violence. (With Joram Ten Brink, co-author). Columbia University Press (Feb 28, 2013), ISBN 0231163347, ISBN 978-0231163347
