= Roderick S. C. Wong =

- Born: October 2, 1944 (age 81); Shanghai, China
- Education: San Diego State University; University of Alberta
- Known for: Asymptotic approximation of integrals Asymptotic theory for difference equations
- Scientific career
- Fields: Mathematics
- Workplaces: City University of Hong Kong; Southern University of Science and Technology; University of Manitoba
- Doctoral advisor: Max Wyman

Roderick Sue-Chuen Wong (born October 2, 1944) is a mathematician who works in classical analysis. His research mainly focuses on asymptotic analysis, singular perturbation theory, special functions and orthogonal polynomials, integral transforms, integral equations, and ordinary differential equations. He is currently a chair professor at City University of Hong Kong and director of the Liu Bie Ju Centre for Mathematical Sciences.

== Education and career ==
Wong obtained his BA degree in mathematics from San Diego State College in 1965 and his PhD from the University of Alberta in 1969. He started his career as an assistant professor in the Department of Mathematics at the University of Manitoba and was promoted to full professor in 1979. He received a Killam Research Fellowship (from the Canada Council) from 1982 to 1984 and became a Fellow of the Royal Society of Canada in 1993. He was appointed the head of the Department of Applied Mathematics in 1986, a post which he held until he left the University of Manitoba in 1994.

After spending almost 30 years in Canada, Wong returned to Hong Kong and joined City University of Hong Kong in early 1994 to take up the post of professor of mathematics. He was concurrently appointed head of the then newly formed Department of Mathematics. In 1995, he led the efforts for the establishment of the Liu Bie Ju Centre for Mathematical Sciences and was appointed director of the centre. He was appointed to dean of College of Science and Engineering in 1998, and became vice-president (Research & Technology) and dean of graduate studies in 2006. He later took up the position of vice-president for development & external relations and had been very successful in soliciting pledges of funds for the university. He established the William Benter Prize in Applied Mathematics in 2010. Over the years, the award has been getting more and more recognized internationally and has become one of the highly acclaimed accolades in the field of applied mathematics.

Wong has received many awards and honours for his achievements and contribution over the years. He is a Foreign Member of Accademia delle Scienze di Torino in Italy, a member of the European Academy of Sciences, and a Founding Fellow of Hong Kong Institution of Science. He was awarded the Chevalier dans l’Ordre National de la Légion d’Honneur.

== Professional activities ==
Chairman, Selection Committee of the William Benter Prize in Applied Mathematics, 2008–present

== Books (authored or edited) ==
- R. Wong (2001). Asymptotic Approximations of Integrals. Philadelphia, PA: eprinted by SIAM. doi:10.1137/1.9780898719260. ISBN 978-0-89871-497-5.
- R. Wong (2010). Lecture Notes on Applied Analysis. Series in Analysis. Vol. 5. World Scientific. doi:10.1142/7475. ISBN 978-981-4287-74-6.
- R. Wong with Richard Beals (mathematician) (2010). Special Functions: A Graduate Text. Cambridge University Press. doi:10.1017/CBO9780511762543. ISBN 978-051-1762-54-3.
- R Wong with Richard Beals (mathematician) (2016). Special Functions and Orthogonal Polynomials. Cambridge University Press. ISBN 978-110-7106-98-7.
- Dai, D.; Dai, H. – H.; Zhou, T. Yang and D. X., eds. (2016). The Selected Works of Roderick S.C. Wong. World Scientific. doi:10.1142/9489. ISBN 978-981-4656-04-7.
- R. Wong, ed. (1990). Asymptotic and Computational Analysis. Marcel Dekker. ISBN 978-082-4783-47-1.
- R. Wong, ed. (2000). Selected Papers of F. W. J. Olver. World Scientific Series in 20th Century Mathematics. Vol. 7. World Scientific. doi:10.1142/4251. ISBN 978-981-02-4106-3.
- R. Wong (Editor, with F. Cucker) (2000). The Collected Papers of Stephen Smale. World Scientific, Singapore. doi:10.1142/4424. ISBN 978-981-02-4307-4.
- R. Wong (Editor, with C. Dunkl and Mourad Ismail) (2000). Special Functions. World Scientific, Singapore. doi:10.1142/4502. ISBN 978-981-02-4393-7.
- R. Wong (Editor, with H. Chen) (2004). Differential Equations and Asymptotic Theory in Mathematical Physics. World Scientific, Singapore. doi:10.1142/5667. ISBN 978-981-256-055-1.
