= Andrew Browder =

American mathematician (1931–2019)

- Born: January 8, 1931; Moscow, Russian SFSR, Soviet Union
- Died: March 24, 2019 (aged 88); Providence, Rhode Island, United States
- Education: Massachusetts Institute of Technology (PhD)
- Known for: Functional analysis
- Father: Earl Browder
- Relatives: Felix Browder (brother); William Browder (brother); Bill Browder (nephew); Joshua Browder (great-nephew)
- Scientific career
- Fields: Mathematics
- Institutions: Brown University
- Doctoral advisor: Isadore Singer

Andrew Browder (January 8, 1931 – March 24, 2019) was an American mathematician at Brown University.

== Early life ==
Andrew Browder was born in Moscow, Russia, where his father Earl Browder, an American communist from Kansas, United States, was living and working for a period. His mother was Raisa Berkman, a Russian Jewish woman from St. Petersburg. His brothers were Felix Browder (older), also born in Moscow, and William Browder (younger). All three brothers had careers in mathematics. Their father returned to the United States in the early 1930s, bringing his family with him. The senior Browder became head of the Communist Party USA. He ran for US president in 1936 and 1940.

== Career ==
Browder traced his interest in mathematics to 1955 when he was a private at Fort Dix and Eisenhower offered early release to servicemen entering graduate school. He studied at Massachusetts Institute of Technology. For two years he was a Miller Fellow at University of California, Berkeley and also studied at Aarhus, Denmark. As for teaching, "I taught well over one hundred courses, some of which I found interesting and enjoyable, some pretty depressing, most somewhere in between. The students had parallel experiences."

== Personal life ==
Browder married and had three children including Laura Browder, professor of American Studies at the University of Richmond.

The analytic nature of the game of chess enthralled Browder early on: "My own main sport was always chess. My father taught me the game when I was six, a friend of the family gave me a chess book when I was eleven or twelve, and after that I was hooked."

== Death ==
Andrew Browder died age 88 on March 24, 2019.

== Works ==
In 1969 Browder published Introduction to Function Algebras. "The author develops much of the general theory of function algebras and then applies it in the last two chapters to the theory of rational approximation in the plane, and to finding analytic structure in the spectrum of a Dirichlet algebra."

In 1996 he published an upper-level textbook Mathematical Analysis for well-motivated students having a background of calculus and linear algebra. Four topics are encompassed by the text: single-variable theory, topology and function spaces, measure theory and Lebesgue integration, and functions of several variables.

In 2000 Browder published his article "Topology in the Complex Plane", which described the Brouwer fixed point theorem, the Jordan curve theorem, and Alexander duality.

With Hiroshi Yamaguchi, Browder wrote "A variation formula for harmonic modules and its application to several complex variables".

== External sources ==
- Andrew Browder at the Mathematics Genealogy Project
