= William Browder =

William Browder may refer to:

- William Browder (mathematician) (1934–2025), American mathematician
- Bill Browder (born 1964), American-born British businessman, nephew of the above
