= Richard Beals =

Richard Beals may refer to:

- Dick Beals (1927–2012), American voice actor
- Richard Beals (mathematician) (born 1938), American mathematician
