= Felix Browder =

American mathematician (1927–2016)

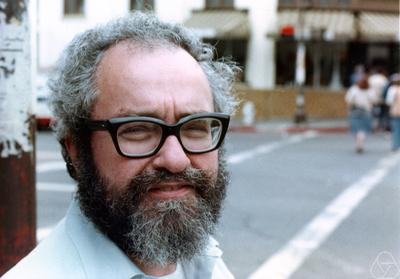
- Browder at UC Berkeley in 1982
- Born: July 31, 1927; Moscow, Russian SFSR, Soviet Union
- Died: December 10, 2016 (aged 89); Princeton, New Jersey, U.S.
- Education: Massachusetts Institute of Technology (BS); Princeton University (MS, PhD)
- Known for: Nonlinear functional analysis Browder fixed-point theorem Browder–Minty theorem
- Children: 2, including Bill
- Father: Earl Browder
- Relatives: William Browder (brother); Andrew Browder (brother); Joshua Browder (grandson)
- Awards: National Medal of Science (1999)
- Scientific career
- Fields: Mathematical analysis
- Workplaces: Rutgers University, New Brunswick; University of Chicago; Yale University; Massachusetts Institute of Technology
- Thesis: The Topological Fixed Point Theory and Its Applications in Functional Analysis (1948)
- Doctoral advisor: Solomon Lefschetz; Witold Hurewicz
- Doctoral students: Richard Beals; Thomas K. Donaldson; Roger D. Nussbaum

Felix Earl Browder (/ˈbraʊdər/; July 31, 1927 – December 10, 2016) was an American mathematician known for his work in nonlinear functional analysis. He received the National Medal of Science in 1999 and was President of the American Mathematical Society until 2000. His two younger brothers also became notable mathematicians, William Browder (an algebraic topologist) and Andrew Browder (a specialist in function algebras).

== Early life and education ==
Felix Earl Browder was born in 1927 in Moscow, Russia, while his American father Earl Browder, born in Wichita, Kansas, was living and working there. He had gone to the Soviet Union in 1927. His mother was Raisa Berkman, a Russian Jewish woman from St. Petersburg whom Browder met and married while living in the Soviet Union. As a child, Felix Browder moved with his family to the United States, where his father Earl Browder for a time was head of the American Communist Party and ran for US president in 1936 and 1940. A 1999 book by Alexander Vassiliev, published after the fall of the Soviet Union, said that Earl Browder was recruited in the 1940s as a spy for the Soviet Union.

Felix Browder was a child prodigy in mathematics; he entered MIT at age 16 in 1944 and graduated in 1946 with his first degree in mathematics. In 1946, at MIT he achieved the rank of a Putnam Fellow in the William Lowell Putnam Mathematical Competition. In 1948, at age 20, he received his doctorate from Princeton University.

== Career ==
Browder had an academic career, encountering difficulty in the 1950s in getting work during the McCarthy era because of his father's communist activities.

Browder headed the University of Chicago's mathematics department for 12 years. He also held posts at MIT, Boston University, Brandeis and Yale. In 1986 he became the first vice president for research at Rutgers University.

Browder received the 1999 National Medal of Science. He also served as president of the American Mathematical Society from 1999 to 2000.

In his outgoing presidential address at the American Mathematical Society, Browder noted, "ideas and techniques from one set of mathematical sources imping[ing] fruitfully on the same thing from another set of mathematical sources" as illustration of bisociation (a term from Arthur Koestler). He also recounted the moves against mathematics in France by Claude Allègre as problematic.

Browder was known for his personal library, which contained some thirty-five thousand books. "The library has a number of different categories," he said. "There is mathematics, physics and science as well as philosophy, literature and history, with a certain number of volumes of contemporary political science and economics. It is a polymath library. I am interested in everything and my library reflects all my interests."

== Family ==
Browder married Eva Tislowitz in 1949, born to Jewish parents. Their children included Thomas Browder, a physicist specializing in the experimental study of subatomic particles, and Bill Browder, who became CEO of Hermitage Capital Management and resides in London.

The late Dr. Browder had two younger brothers who were also research mathematicians, William (an algebraic topologist) and Andrew Browder (a specialist in function algebras). Browder died in 2016 at home in Princeton, New Jersey, aged 89. "In addition to his brothers, survivors include the above mentioned two sons, Thomas Browder of Honolulu and Bill Browder of London; and five grandchildren."

== See also ==
- Earl Browder, father
- William Browder, brother
- Andrew Browder, brother
- Bill Browder, son
- Joshua Browder, grandson
