= Roger D. Nussbaum =

American mathematician

Roger David Nussbaum (born 29 January 1944, in Philadelphia) is an American mathematician, specializing in nonlinear functional analysis and differential equations.

Nussbaum graduated in 1965 with a bachelor's degree from Harvard University. He received his Ph.D. in 1969 from the University of Chicago with thesis The Fixed Point Index and Fixed Point Theorems for K-Set Contractions supervised by Felix Browder. At Rutgers University Nussbaum became in 1969 an assistant professor, in 1973 an associate professor, and in 1977 a full professor. He retired there as professor emeritus. He was elected in 2012 a Fellow of the American Mathematical Society.

== Selected publications ==
=== Articles ===
- Browder, Felix E.; Nussbaum, Roger D. (1968). "The topological degree for noncompact nonlinear mappings in Banach spaces". Bulletin of the American Mathematical Society. 74 (4): 671–677. doi:10.1090/S0002-9904-1968-11988-3.
- Nussbaum, Roger D. (1969). "The fixed point index and asymptotic fixed point theorems for $k$-set-contractions". Bulletin of the American Mathematical Society. 75 (3): 490–496. doi:10.1090/S0002-9904-1969-12213-5.
- —— (1970). "The radius of the essential spectrum". Duke Mathematical Journal. 37 (3): 473–478. doi:10.1215/S0012-7094-70-03759-2.
- —— (1970). "Spectral mapping theorems and perturbation theorems for Browder's essential spectrum". Transactions of the American Mathematical Society. 150 (2): 445–455. doi:10.1090/S0002-9947-1970-0265967-9.
- —— (1971). "The fixed point index for local condensing maps". Annali di Matematica Pura ed Applicata. 89 (1): 217–258. doi:10.1007/BF02414948. ISSN 0373-3114. S2CID 119544692.
- —— (1971). "Some fixed point theorems". Bulletin of the American Mathematical Society. 77 (3): 360–366. doi:10.1090/S0002-9904-1971-12694-0.
- —— (1972). "Some asymptotic fixed point theorems". Transactions of the American Mathematical Society. 171: 349–375. doi:10.1090/S0002-9947-1972-0310719-6.
- —— (1978). "A Hopf global bifurcation theorem for retarded functional differential equations". Transactions of the American Mathematical Society. 238: 139–164. doi:10.1090/S0002-9947-1978-0482913-0.
- —— (1981). "Eigenvectors of nonlinear positive operators and the linear Krein-Rutman theorem". In: Fixed point theory. Lecture Notes in Mathematics. Vol. 886. Berlin; Heidelberg: Springer. pp. 309–330. doi:10.1007/BFb0092191. ISBN 978-3-540-11152-8.
- De Figueiredo D.G.; Lions P.L.; —— (1982). "A Priori Estimates and Existence of Positive Solutions of Semilinear Elliptic Equations". In: Costa D. (ed.) Djairo G. de Figueiredo - Selected Papers. Cham, Switzerland: Springer. pp. 133–155. doi:10.1007/978-3-319-02856-9_11. ISBN 978-3-319-02855-2. (over 600 citations)
- —— (1983). "Some remarks on a conjecture in parameter adaptive control". Systems & Control Letters. 3 (5): 243–246. doi:10.1016/0167-6911(83)90021-X. ISSN 0167-6911. (over 1100 citations)
- ——; Walsh, Bertram (1998). "Approximation by polynomials with nonnegative coefficients and the spectral theory of positive operators". Transactions of the American Mathematical Society. 350 (6): 2367–2391. doi:10.1090/S0002-9947-98-01998-9.
- Mallet-Paret, John; —— (2011). "Inequivalent measures of noncompactness and the radius of the essential spectrum". Proceedings of the American Mathematical Society. 139 (3): 917–930. doi:10.1090/S0002-9939-2010-10511-7.
- ——; Priyadarshi, Amit; Verduyn Lunel, Sjoerd (2012). "Positive operators and Hausdorff dimension of invariant sets". Transactions of the American Mathematical Society. 364 (2): 1029–1066. doi:10.1090/S0002-9947-2011-05484-X.
- Lemmens, Bas; —— (2013). "Continuity of the cone spectral radius". Proceedings of the American Mathematical Society. 141 (8): 2741–2754. arXiv:1107.4532. doi:10.1090/S0002-9939-2013-11520-0.

=== Books ===
- with Bas Lemmens: Nonlinear Perron-Frobenius Theory, Cambridge Tracts in Mathematics, Cambridge University Press 2012
- with S. M. Verduyn-Lunel: Generalizations of the Perron-Frobenius Theorem for Nonlinear Maps, Memoirs AMS 1999
- with Heinz-Otto Peitgen: Special and Spurious Solutions of $\dot{x}(t)=-\alpha f(x(t-1))$, Memoirs AMS, 1984
- with Patrick Fitzpatrick, Jean Mawhin, Mario Martelli: Topological Methods for Ordinary Differential Equations, CIME Lectures, Montecacini Terme 1991, Lecture Notes in Mathematics 1537, Springer Verlag 1993
- Hilbert's projective metric and iterated nonlinear maps, 2 vols., AMS 1988
- Differential-delay equations with two time lags, Memoirs AMS 1978
