= Santiago López de Medrano =

Mexican mathematician (born 1942)

Santiago López de Medrano Sánchez (born October 15, 1942, in Mexico City) is a Mexican mathematician, who works as a researcher at the National Autonomous University of Mexico (UNAM). His research has concerned knot theory, singularity theory, biomathematics, and differential topology.

López de Medrano did his undergraduate studies at UNAM, and earned his Ph.D. from Princeton University in 1969, under the supervision of William Browder. He returned to UNAM as a researcher and professor in 1968, and was president of the Mexican Mathematical Society from 1969 to 1973.

López de Medrano presented his work on knot invariants at the International Congress of Mathematicians in 1970. In 2012, he became one of the inaugural fellows of the American Mathematical Society.
