= William Browder (mathematician) =

American mathematician (1934–2025)

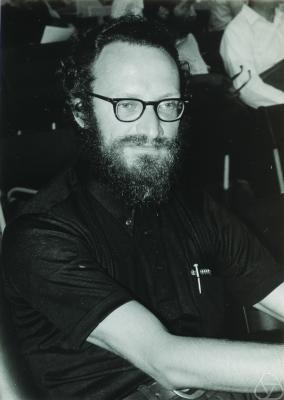
- Browder in 1970
- Born: January 6, 1934; New York City, U.S.
- Died: February 4, 2025 (aged 91); Princeton, New Jersey, U.S.
- Education: Massachusetts Institute of Technology (BS); Princeton University (MS, PhD)
- Known for: Surgery theory method for classifying high-dimensional manifolds
- Father: Earl Browder
- Relatives: Felix Browder (brother); Andrew Browder (brother); Bill Browder (nephew); Joshua Browder (great-nephew)
- Scientific career
- Fields: Mathematics
- Workplaces: Princeton University
- Doctoral advisor: John Coleman Moore
- Doctoral students: Alejandro Adem; Sylvain Cappell; Michael Freedman; Louis Kauffman; Santiago López de Medrano; Norman Levitt; George Lusztig; Frank Quinn; Dennis Sullivan; Tadashi Tokieda

William Browder (January 6, 1934 – February 4, 2025) was an American mathematician, who specialized in algebraic topology, differential topology and differential geometry. He served as president of the American Mathematical Society from 1989 to 1991.

== Early life and education ==
William Browder was born in a Jewish hospital in Harlem, New York City on January 6, 1934, the son of Raisa (née Berkman), a Russian Jewish woman from Saint Petersburg, and American Communist Party leader Earl Browder, from Wichita, Kansas. His father had moved to the Soviet Union in 1927, where he met and married Raisa. Their first two sons, Felix and Andrew, were born in Moscow in 1931. William attended local public schools in Yonkers for early schooling and graduated from the Massachusetts Institute of Technology with a B.S. degree in 1954. He was a instructor at the University of Rochester from 1957 to 1958 and at Cornell University from 1958 until 1963. In August 1957, his original thesis fell apart when his advisor, John Coleman Moore, found a problem with the idea. However, William came up with a new idea which was titled Homology of Loop Spaces. He received his Ph.D. from Princeton University in 1958.

== Career ==
From 1964 onwards, Browder was a professor at Princeton University; he was chair of the mathematics department at Princeton from 1971 to 1973. He was editor of the journal Annals of Mathematics from 1969 to 1981, and president of the American Mathematical Society from 1989 to 1991.

Browder was elected to the United States National Academy of Sciences in 1980, the American Academy of Arts and Sciences in 1984, and the Finnish Society of Sciences and Letters in 1990. In 1994, a conference was held at Princeton in celebration of his 60th birthday. A conference was held at Princeton on the occasion of his retirement in 2012. Browder advised 30 Ph.D. students in his career as well as multiple undergraduate students.

== Death ==
Browder died on February 4, 2025, at the age of 91.

== Selected bibliography ==
Books

- Surgery on Simply-Connected Manifolds, Ergebnisse der Mathematik und ihrer Grenzgebiete, vol. 65, Springer-Verlag, Berlin (1972)
- Algebraic Topology and Algebraic K-Theory, Princeton University Press, 1987, ISBN 0-691-08426-2

Seminal papers

- "Homotopy Type of Differentiable Manifolds", Proc. 1962 Aarhus Conference, published in Proc. 1993
- Oberwolfach Novikov Conjecture Conference proceedings, London Mathematical Society Lecture Notes 226 (1995)
- "The Kervaire Invariant of Framed Manifolds and Its Generalization", Annals of Mathematics 90, 157–186 (1969)

== See also ==
- Assembly map
- Exotic sphere
- Kervaire invariant
- Normal invariant
- Signature (topology)
- Surgery exact sequence
