= Frank Quinn (mathematician) =

American mathematician (born 1946)

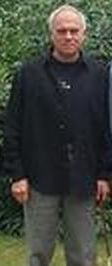
- Born: 1946 (age 79–80)
- Education: Princeton University
- Known for: Quinn theorem
- Scientific career
- Fields: Mathematics
- Workplaces: Virginia Tech
- Doctoral advisor: William Browder; Michel Kervaire
- Website: https://personal.math.vt.edu/fquinn/

Frank Stringfellow Quinn, III (born 1946) is an American mathematician and professor of mathematics at Virginia Polytechnic Institute and State University, specializing in geometric topology.

== Contributions ==
He contributed to the mathematical field of 4-manifolds, including a proof of the 4-dimensional annulus theorem. In surgery theory, he made several important contributions: the invention of the assembly map, that enables a functorial description of surgery in the topological category, with his thesis advisor, William Browder, the development of an early surgery theory for stratified spaces, and perhaps most importantly, he pioneered the use of controlled methods in geometric topology and in algebra. Among his important applications of "control" are his aforementioned proof of the 4-dimensional annulus theorem, leading to the Quinn theorem, his development of a flexible category of stratified spaces, and, in combination with work of Robert D. Edwards, a useful characterization of high-dimensional manifolds among homology manifolds.

In addition to his work in mathematical research, he has written articles on the nature and history of mathematics and on issues of mathematical education.

=== Quinn theorem ===
In differential topology, the Quinn theorem is a result about topological 4-manifolds. It shows the importance of the topological property of compactness for smoothability, hence if there exists a compatible smooth structure. Quinn proved it in 1984.

=== Formulation ===
Every non-compact topological 4-manifold is smoothable. A counterexample is the E8 manifold, which is a compact and non-smoothable topological 4-manifold. A more general formulation is: A topological 4-manifold has a smooth structure in the complement of any closed set with at least one point in each compact component.

== Awards and honors ==
In 2012 he became a fellow of the American Mathematical Society.

== Selected publications ==
- Frank Quinn, "Ends of maps. I." Annals of Mathematics (2) 110 (1979), no. 2, pp. 275–331.
- Frank Quinn, "Ends of maps. II." Inventiones Mathematicae 68 (1982), no. 3, pp. 353–424.
- Frank Quinn, "Ends of maps. III: Dimensions 4 and 5." Journal of Differential Geometry 17 (1982), no. 3, pp. 503–521.
- Michael Freedman and Frank Quinn, Topology of 4-manifolds. Princeton Mathematical Series, 39. Princeton University Press, Princeton, NJ, 1990. viii+259 pp. ISBN 0-691-08577-3
- Quinn, Frank (1984). "Smooth structures on 4-manifolds". American Mathematical Society. Contemp. Math. 35: 473–479.
- Arthur Jaffe and Frank Quinn, "Theoretical mathematics: Toward a cultural synthesis of mathematics and theoretical physics." Bulletin of the American Mathematical Society (New Series) 29 (1993), no. 1, pp. 1-13.
- Vyacheslav S. Krushkal and Frank Quinn, "Subexponential groups in 4-manifold topology." Geometry & Topology 4 (2000), pp. 407–430.
