= Ransdell =

Ransdell is a surname. Notable people with the surname include:

- Bill Ransdell (born 1963), American football player
- Joseph E. Ransdell (1858–1954), U.S. senator from Louisiana, author of the Ransdell Act creating the National Institutes of Health; brother of Francis Xavier Ransdell
- Joseph Morton Ransdell (1931–2010), American philosopher
- Sanford Ransdell (1781–1854), Indiana pioneer
- Judith Ransdell (1946 - 2011), Actress and producer, known for American Gigolo (1980), Jungle Warriors (1984) and Hardcore (1979).
