= Richard Beals (mathematician) =

American mathematician

- Born: Richard William Beals; May 28, 1938 (age 88); Erie, Pennsylvania, United States
- Education: Yale University (BA, MA, PhD)
- Children: 3
- Scientific career
- Fields: Mathematics
- Workplaces: University of Chicago; Yale University
- Thesis: Non-Local Boundary Value Problems for Elliptic Partial Differential Operators (1964)
- Doctoral advisor: Felix Browder

Richard William Beals (28 May 1938, Erie, Pennsylvania) is an American mathematician who works on partial differential equations and functional analysis. He is known as the author or co-author of several mathematical textbooks.

Beals studied at Yale University earning a B.A. in 1960, an M.A. in 1962, and a Ph.D. in 1964 under Felix Browder with thesis Non-Local Boundary Value Problems for Elliptic Partial Differential Operators. In the academic year 1965/1966 he was a visiting assistant professor at the University of Chicago, where he became in 1966 an assistant professor and later a professor. In 1977 he became a professor at Yale University.

Beals received the Quantrell Award.

Beals works on inverse problems in scattering theory, integrable systems, pseudodifferential operators, complex analysis, global analysis and transport theory. He has been married since 1962 and has three children.

He should not be confused with the mathematics professor at Rutgers University named R. Michael Beals (born in 1954), who is Richard Beals's brother.

== Works ==
- Beals, Richard (2004). Analysis: an introduction. Cambridge, UK: Cambridge University Press. ISBN 978-0-511-64842-7. OCLC 667041380.
- Beals, Richard; Greiner, Peter (1988). Calculus on Heisenberg manifolds. Annals of Mathematics Studies. Vol. 119. Princeton, N.J.: Princeton University Press. doi:10.1515/9781400882397. ISBN 0-691-08500-5. MR 0953082. OCLC 17765652.
- Advanced mathematical analysis; periodic functions and distributions, complex analysis, Laplace transform and applications, Springer Verlag 1973; 2013 pbk edition
- with M. Salah Baouendi and Linda Preiss Rothschild (eds.) Microlocal Analysis, American Mathematical Society 1984
- with Roderick Wong: Special functions: a graduate text, Cambridge University Press 2010
  - Beals, Richard; Wong, Roderick (2016). Special Functions and Orthogonal Polynomials. Cambridge: Cambridge University Press. doi:10.1017/cbo9781316227381. ISBN 978-1-316-22738-1. MR 3524801. (Revised with 4 new chapters.)
- Topics in Operator Theory, University of Chicago Press 1971
- Beals, Richard; Deift, Percy; Tomei, Carlos (1988). Direct and inverse scattering on the line. Providence, R.I.: American Mathematical Society. doi:10.1090/surv/028. ISBN 0-8218-1530-X. MR 0954382. OCLC 17875951. 2015 pbk edition
