= DoNotPay =

Legal technology chatbot

- Original author: Joshua Browder
- Release: 2015; 11 years ago
- Operating system: iOS, Android
- Available in: English
- Type: Legal technology, chatbot
- Website: donotpay.com

DoNotPay is an American company specializing in online legal services and chatbots. The product provides a "robot lawyer" service that claims to make use of artificial intelligence to contest parking tickets and provide various other legal services, with a subscription cost of $36 for three months.

DoNotPay states that its services help customers seek refunds on flight tickets and hotel bookings, cancel free trials, sue people, apply for asylum or homeless housing, seek claims from Equifax during the aftermath of its security breach, and obtain U.S. visas and green cards. DoNotPay offers a Free Trial Card feature which gives users a virtual credit card number that can be used to sign up for free online trials (such as Netflix and Spotify). As soon as the free trial period ends, the card automatically declines any charges. DoNotPay also claims that its services allow users to automatically apply for refunds, cancel subscriptions, fight spam in people's inboxes, combat volatile airline prices, and file damage claims with city offices.

== History ==
DoNotPay was founded in 2015 by Joshua Browder. DoNotPay started off as an app for contesting parking tickets. It sells services which generate documents on legal issues ranging from consumer protection to immigration rights; it states that these are generated via automation and AI. The company claims its application is supported by the IBM Watson AI. It is currently available in the United Kingdom and United States (in all 50 states).

In 2021, DoNotPay raised $10 million from investors, including Andreesen Horowitz, Lux Capital, Tribe Capital, and others, reaching a valuation of $210 million. In January 2024, DoNotPay began paying dividends to its investors.

== Reception ==
In 2016, Joshua Browder, the company's founder, told The Guardian that the chatbot had contested more than 250,000 parking tickets in London and New York and won 160,000 of them, although the newspaper did not appear to verify the claim.

DoNotPay's effectiveness and marketing have been subject to praise and criticism. In September 2024, the company received a $193,000 fine from the Federal Trade Commission (FTC) for falsely advertising the capabilities of some of its artificial intelligence (AI) services. The FTC also stated that the company never tested the legal accuracy of the chatbot's answers.

Browder's technology has received mixed reviews. For example, a blog post from The Guardian noted that it "just drafted an impressive notice under the Data Protection Act 1998 not to use my personal information for direct marketing." Similarly, a writer with The American Lawyer noted that, "one of DoNotPay's chatbots helped me draft a strong, well-cited and appropriately toned letter requesting extended maternity leave."

However, Legal Cheek tested the service in 2016 with "fairly basic legal questions" and noted that it failed to answer most of them. Above the Law noted that the service may "be too good to be true" due to errors in the legal advice provided, noting that when dealing with "things as important as securing immigration status, which is one of the services DoNotPay promotes, mistakes can ruin lives." Above the Law ultimately recommended the service for "clear-cut issues like parking tickets or non-critical matters," while cautioning against its use for legal issues with higher stakes.

In January 2023, Browder claimed that the organization would attempt to use DoNotPay live in court, but was forced to halt after being warned about the unlicensed practice of law. NPR wrote that "some observers" have had "mixed to shoddy results attempting to use its basic features", and noted that Browder, the company's founder, is known for attention-seeking stunts.

== Legal action ==
=== 2023 class-action lawsuits ===
In March 2023, two separate class-action lawsuits were filed against DoNotPay.

The first lawsuit was filed on behalf of DoNotPay's customers under California's Unfair Competition Law. The plaintiffs alleged that the company "misled customers and misrepresented its product" and was "practicing law without a license". The parties "reached a settlement in principle" without exposing the details of the settlement.

The second lawsuit was filed by law firm MillerKing on its own behalf, alleging that DoNotPay causes "irreparable harm" to its customers and "infringes on the rights of law firms employing those who are properly licensed." Chief District Judge Nancy Rosenstengel dismissed this lawsuit without prejudice for lack of standing, holding that the plaintiffs failed to allege any concrete injury.

=== 2024 Federal Trade Commission fine ===
In September 2024, the United States Federal Trade Commission (FTC) announced an enforcement action against DoNotPay, alleging that the company "relied on artificial intelligence as a way to supercharge deceptive or unfair conduct that harms consumers[...]." For example, the company's advertising featured a quote supposedly from the Los Angeles Times which praised its services, but was actually from a high schooler's op-ed on the newspaper's "High School Insider" platform. The FTC also stated that the company never tested the quality of its legal services or hired attorneys to assess the accuracy of the chatbot's answers.

In the proposed settlement, DoNotPay did not admit liability, but did agree to several penalties, including a fine of $193,000 and limitations on its future marketing claims.

== See also ==
- Artificial intelligence and law
- Computational law
- Lawbot
- Legal expert system
- Legal informatics
- Legal technology
