= Jamison Firestone =

American attorney

Jamison Reed Firestone (born 1966) is an American attorney. Firestone graduated from Tulane University in 1988 and Tulane Law School in 1991. In August 1991, shortly before the fall of the Soviet Union, he moved to Moscow, Russia and co-founded the law firm Firestone Duncan. He fled Russia in August 2009 following the arrest of his employee Sergei Magnitsky, who died in prison, after eleven months' incarceration without trial.

== Firestone Duncan ==
Firestone founded the law firm of Firestone Duncan in 1993 in Moscow, with his close friend Terry Michael Duncan. In the immediate aftermath of the fall of the Soviet Union, the two young men had thought there were business opportunities in Russia, where privatisation efforts were widespread.

On October 3, 1993, Terry Duncan was shot and killed by a sniper during the Russian Constitutional Crisis while aiding the wounded at the Ostankino Television Centre. Local papers reported he had aided twelve wounded Russians and died while trying to rescue American photo journalist Otto Pohl who had been shot twice. Otto Pohl lived and eventually interviewed the man who shot them.

In 1994, Firestone Duncan also opened a separate audit practice with two Russian auditors, one of whom was Konstantin Ponomarev. In December 1995 the firm split with Firestone accusing Ponomarev of malfeasance and excluding him, and Ponomarev accusing Firestone of stealing his company. Subsequently, Ponomarev went on to make the Forbes Russia list through a single settlement with IKEA of almost US$1 billion, widely reported as legalised extortion. In 2017 Ponomarev was arrested and imprisoned pending trial on charges of fraud.

== The Magnitsky Affair ==
One of Firestone Duncan's employees was a Russian accountant and auditor Sergei Magnitsky. Among the companies that Firestone Duncan represented was Hermitage Capital Management, co-founded by American-British financier Bill Browder. Magnitsky began to investigate what he alleged was a massive tax fraud scheme, whereby criminals obtained control of three companies managed by Hermitage Fund and arranged a fraudulent refund of $230 million from the Russian treasury. Magnitsky testified against the alleged criminals and officials involved, and was subsequently arrested by Russian police in 2008. He died in 2009 eleven months later while in police custody, prior to ever going to trial.

According to the Russian President's Council on Human Rights, the prison had created deadly conditions which destroyed Magnitsky's health, and then denied him medical treatment. When Magnitsky's health broke and he was in need of immediate surgery, officials handcuffed him to a bed, beat him with rubber batons and locked him in his cell, leaving him there until he was dead.

== Lobbying for the Magnitsky Sanctions worldwide ==
Following Magnitsky's death in prison, Firestone became one of the chief advocates of United States passage of the Magnitsky Act of 2012, which sanctioned Russian officials believed to have been responsible for the death of Magnitsky and officials who used their powers to attack human rights defenders, journalists and anti corruption activists. It prevented their entry into the US and subjected their US assets to forfeiture.

Firestone published videos on YouTube attracting several million views (as of July 2016) that outlined Magnitsky's allegations against Russian officials, demonstrated how these officials knew each other, and showed that they had acquired assets in excess of $50 million around the time of the crime Magnitsky exposed. The source for the information in one of these videos was Alexander Perepilichny, a business associate of the Russian tax officials who passed Firestone documents in the Polo Bar of the Westbury hotel in London specifically for the purpose of exposing the officials. Mr. Perepilichny later died under mysterious circumstances in Surrey and his death is currently the subject of an official inquest in the UK.

For five years after the death of Magnitsky in 2009, Firestone contributed and featured in articles in The Moscow Times, Foreign Policy, The Lawyer, and other publications, in continued protest against the Russian government's perceived lack of action in response to the death of Magnitsky, and encouraging various countries to adopt Magnitsky Sanctions.

Magnitsky Sanctions have now been adopted by the United States, Estonia, Canada, and partially by the United Kingdom.

== Involvement in United States v. Prevezon Holdings ==
In May 2017, Firestone was scheduled to testify on behalf of the US Government in United States v. Prevezon Holdings Ltd. Prevezon's attorney was Louis Freeh. (Note: Prevezon's attorney Louis Freeh was Director of the FBI from September 1, 1993 until June 25, 2001. In May 2018, Freeh purchased a $9.38 million home from Armen A. Manoogian in Palm Beach, Florida, near Mar-a-Lago where Freeh often attends events.) Prevezon Holdings which was a Cypriot company owned by Denis Katsyv, (Note: Alfa Bank had a correspondent account for the Russian Bank Krainiy Sever through which millions of dollars flowed during the money laundering.) the son of Pyotr Katsyv (Russian: Кацыв Пётр Дмитриевич), a Russian official (Note: He was the Minister of Transport for Moscow region from 2000 to 2012, 2012 to 2013 head of the main department for the Moscow region, and from October 2014 to February 2019 vice president of Russian Railways (Russian: ОАО "Российские железные дороги" (РЖД)).) which the US government alleged had received some of the money from the fraud uncovered by Magnitsky. The case was originally brought by US attorney Preet Bharara. Before the case could come to trial, President Donald Trump fired Preet Bharara, and, in May 2017, Prevezon agreed to pay a fine of $5.9 million to settle with United States federal prosecutors headed by Joon Kim, who was appointed by Jeff Sessions as the acting US attorney for the Southern District of New York from March 2017 to January 2018. In November 2017, Prevezon stated that it would pay the fine using money from AFI Europe which is a subsidiary of Lev Leviev's Africa Israel Investments.

The case and players were highlighted again when reporters noted that Natalia Veselnitskaya, a Russian lawyer who had represented Prevezon, had met with Donald Trump Jr, in 2016 during his father's presidential campaign. Veselnitskaya was said to have lobbied for the removal of Magnitsky Act sanctions against Russian nationals in exchange for providing compromising information about Hillary Clinton, a fact President Trump personally denied in a statement drafted aboard Air Force One. In April 2016, Dana Rohrabacher and Paul Behrends, who is a member of his staff, traveled to Russia and returned with Yuri Chaika's confidential talking points memo about incriminating information on Democratic donors which were later discussed in the Trump Tower meeting on June 9, 2016. According to Veselnitskaya, the Ziff Brothers Investments, who have Russian investments with Bill Browder's Hermitage Capital Management, failed to properly pay their taxes in Russia. (Note: Veselnitskaya's talking points memo at the Trump Tower meeting was very similar to the confidential memo that Dana Rohrabacher received from Chaika.) In July 2018, it was revealed that Trump's former lawyer, Michael Cohen, was reportedly willing to testify in front of special counsel Robert Mueller that Trump knew about the meeting before it took place, directly contradicting the President's claims.
