= Terry Michael Duncan =

American attorney (1967–1993)

Terry Michael Duncan (January 24, 1967 – October 3, 1993) was an American citizen who was killed by pro-Yeltsin troops during the 1993 Russian constitutional crisis.

== Biography ==
Born in the U.S. state of Georgia, Duncan went to Tulane University for undergrad and earned his law degree from George Washington University in Washington, D.C. Alongside Jamison Firestone, Duncan moved to Moscow to establish the law firm Firestone Duncan & Associates, which employed Russian accountant and auditor Sergei Magnitsky.

== Death ==
"On the afternoon of October 3... Mike Duncan and his friends were lounging around their central Moscow apartment, watching Spartacus on VHS. ...Mike had been lured to Moscow by the bounty of a newly democratic Russia. He had arrived that June to set up a law firm and quickly found clients as Western companies rushed to the new frontier. That afternoon he was in high spirits: His company had just turned its first profit, and he was traveling to the U.S. in three weeks to plan his wedding and to bring his fiancée back with him to Russia. Between Spartacus tapes someone flipped on CNN; the news showed skirmishes between protesters and police at the Russian parliament building. Mike, eager to witness history, made the trip there and then to Ostankino.

One after another, he rescued wounded people from the zone of gunfire and returned again under bullets, demonstrating extraordinary heroism. According to Russian sources, he has rescued 12 people. A friend of him said, "He was always a risky person, and took care of those in hard situations." The last person who Duncan attempted to save was an injured photo reporter of The New York Times newspaper, Otto Pohl, but a sniper from the TV center building shot Duncan in the head (according to a different source, Duncan was killed by "a casual bullet").

After the shooting his body was carried away by soldiers of a special unit from the TV center building to Argunovskaya street. There are several eyewitnesses to the shooting, as well as video and photographic footage. He was survived by his father, mother and his younger brother.

== Firestone Duncan ==
The name of the law firm that Duncan founded alongside his business partner Jamison Firestone, "Firestone Duncan", resurfaced in the news after the death of its auditor Sergei Magnitsky in 2009.
