= Maung Maung Soe (general) =

Burmese army general

His Excellency Major General Maung Maung Soe
- မောင်မောင်စိုး

Commander of the Western Regional Military Command of the Myanmar Army
- In office October 2016 – 10 November 2017

Personal details
- Born: 1964 (age 61–62) Magway, Myanmar
- Education: Defence Services Academy
- Known for: Oversaw operations in Rakhine State; sanctioned by the U.S., Canada, Australia, and the EU for human rights abuses

Military service
- Allegiance: Myanmar
- Branch/service: Myanmar Army
- Rank: Major General
- Battles/wars: Rohingya crisis

Maung Maung Soe (Burmese: မောင်မောင်စိုး, born 1964) is a Burmese military officer who is a major general in the Myanmar Army.

Maung Maung Soe was formerly the commander of Western Regional Military Command, overseeing Myanmar's campaign against the Rohingya, which has been characterized by brutality and atrocities. The U.S. government imposed Global Magnitsky Act sanctions against the general in December 2017, citing "credible evidence" that he commanded forces involved in violence, sexual assaults, extrajudicial killings and the burning of villages of the Rohingya minority. The Government of Myanmar released a statement that said the accusations are based on unreliable sources. In February 2018, the Canadian government sanctioned Maung Maung Soe under the Justice for Victims of Corrupt Foreign Officials Act, stating that he was "responsible for, or complicit in, gross violations of internationally recognized human rights" (specifically, ethnic cleansing). He has also been sanctioned by Australia and the European Union (EU).

In 2018, the United Nations Independent International Fact-Finding Mission on Myanmar, led by Marzuki Darusman, determined that Maung Maung Soe and other Myanmar military generals oversaw atrocities against the Rohingya in Rakhine, Kachin and Shan states; that the generals did so with genocidal intent; and that the country's civilian government under Aung San Suu Kyi allowed it to happen. The UN investigative panel said that Maung Maung Soe, along with four other commanders (Soe Win, Aung Kyaw Zaw, Min Aung Hlaing, and Than Oo) should be tried for war crimes and crimes against humanity (including mass killings, gang rapes, and genocide) in the International Criminal Court or an ad hoc international tribunal.

In 2018, after the EU imposed sanctions against Maung Maung Soe and six other military officers, the Burmese government dismissed him from the armed forces, a rare step for the government. The government did not mention the sanctions in its statement dismissing Maung Maung Soe, instead blaming him for weak management and an insufficient response to Arakan Rohingya Salvation Army (ARSA) attacks in 2016 and 2017.
