= EU Global Human Rights Sanctions Regime =

EU mechanism punishing non-EU human rights violators

The EU Global Human Rights Sanctions Mechanism is a mechanism of the Council of the European Union to punish personnel from non-EU countries responsible for gross violations of human rights. Inspired by the Global Magnitsky Act in the US, the mechanism permits the EU to maintain a list of human rights violators around the globe, imposing on them various sanctions, such as visa bans or asset freezes, on behalf of the entire bloc. The mechanism was adopted by the Foreign Affairs Council on 7 December 2020 under Council Regulation (EU) 2020/1998 and Council Decision (CFSP) 2020/1999. As of December 2025, the Council had prolonged the list of sanctioned individuals and entities through December 8, 2026, with restrictive measures applying to 135 individuals and 37 entities.

== Background ==
In its history, the EU has on multiple occasions imposed sanctions on other countries for human rights violations. Some of the examples include an arm embargo imposed on China since 1989 for the Tiananmen Square Massacre, or asset freezes on certain officials in Iran who repressed and tortured human right activists. However, those were individual sanctions which only targeted particular countries. This approach of adopting a new sanction policy for each country has its limitations, such as the time required to go through the legislation process in the EU or the political implications the process may bring.

In 2016, the US enacted the Global Magnitsky Act which allows the US government to impose sanctions on human right violators on a global scope. Multiple countries, including several members of the EU, soon followed the US's lead and enacted similar legislations to crack down on foreign human right violations. Estonia passed a law in 2016 banning foreigners deemed guilty of human right abuse from entering the country. Lithuania, Latvia, and the United Kingdom, which was a member of the EU at that time, also followed suit and passed similar laws. Additionally, the Dutch parliament has on multiple occasions requested the Dutch government to initiate a similar legislation. However, the Dutch government refused and argued that such a legislation will be more effective if passed on the EU level, which led to the discussion of an EU level human rights sanction regime later.

== Developments ==
In late 2018, the Dutch government drafted a position paper named Towards An EU Global Human Rights Sanctions Regime, in which it proposed an EU-level sanction regime as the title suggested. Following the proposal, the Dutch government invited representatives from all other EU member states to The Hague for discussion. The European Parliament subsequently adopted a resolution regarding the proposed sanction regime on 14 March 2019, in which it called on the council to swiftly establish an EU-level human right sanction regime. The resolution also gave several suggestions regarding the regime, such as that it should symbolically carry Sergei Magnitsky’s name, and that an EU-level advisory committee may be set up to oversee the regime.

On 9 December 2019, Josep Borrell, the EU High Representative of the Union for Foreign Affairs and Security Policy, confirmed that the member states of the EU have reached a strong consensus on the proposed regime, and thus the European External Action Service will start to prepare the documentation for the sanction regime.

After 6 months, the European Parliament passed a resolution regarding the Hong Kong national security law on 15 June 2020, in which it called for the council to finalise the preparatory work on the sanction regime, and to use the regime to impose sanctions on Chinese officials responsible for the Hong Kong national security legislation.

On 22 March 2021, sanctions were applied against a number of individuals and entities from China, Eritrea, Libya, North Korea, South Sudan and Russia. Among those targeted were Minister of State Security Jong Kyong-thaek and Minister of Social Security Ri Yong-gil allegedly for 'torture and other cruel, inhuman or degrading treatment or punishment' and executions by the police forces in North Korea. However, the impact of these sanction is thought to be minimal to North Korea and that the sanctions were driven by external factors, instead of any situations inside the DPRK.

In November 2026, the UK announced that there were significant expansions to the Global Human Rights Sanctions Regime with the intent to allow the government to impose sanctions on anyone involved in war crimes. This was not part of the previous set of regulations adopted in 2020 and gives the government the ability to also impose sanctions for responsible parties to violations of international humanitarian law as well.

== Reasons for implementation ==
=== Faster and more flexible process ===
At the present time, the procedure required to impose an EU sanction on an individual are complex and long, and is thus usually only utilized when a major event involving violent conflict or democratic backsliding occurred. Under an article in the Lisbon Treaty concerning terrorism, any measures of freezing funds or assets must be adopted by the Council and the European Parliament through the normal legislative procedure. In contrast, the new sanction framework, albeit not yet finalized, can provide a more simple procedure to blacklist human right violators without having to adopt a new legislation every time.

=== Avoidance of unintended negative effect ===
All the previous sanctions imposed by the EU in the past, except the terrorism list, are all state-based sanctions. In contrast, the new sanction regime will be individual-based. While state-based sanctions may induce a deterrent effect on countries guilty of human rights violations, they may also unintendedly affect the social rights and the quality of life of innocent civilians living in the targeted state. For example, a trade ban targeted at a third country can significantly disrupt the distribution of food and sanitation supplies to vulnerable groups such as the poor or women, but the oppressive elites in the targeted state may be able to maintain their quality of life as they usually enjoy considerable wealth. This may also diminish the effectiveness of sanctions as the elites may be unaffected by them. Therefore, a sanction regime targeting individuals instead of states can avoid the unintended adverse impact on innocent civilians, while also being more effective in applying pressure to the personnel responsible for the human rights violations.
