= Allard Prize for International Integrity =

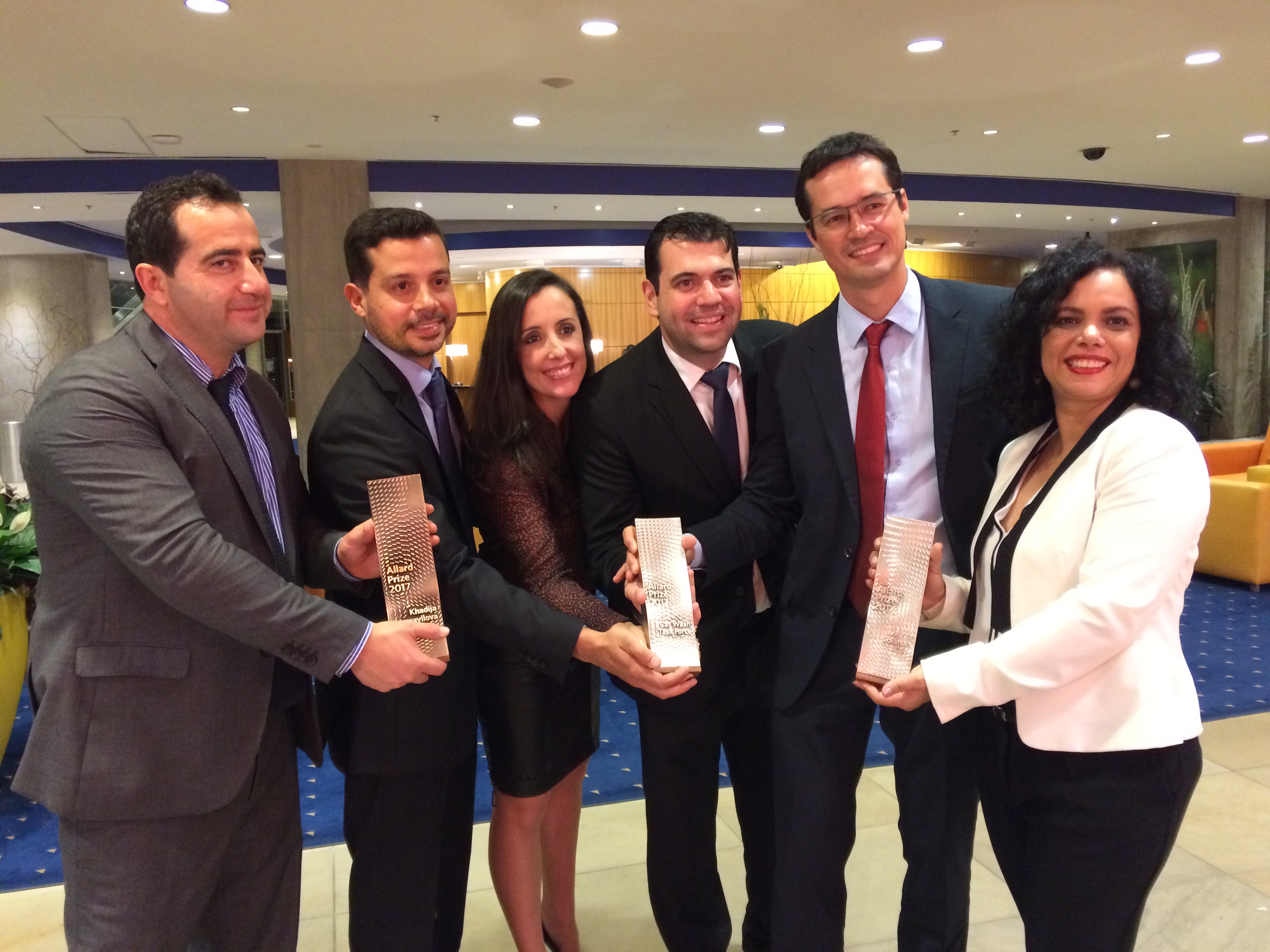
- Winners of the 2017 Allard Prize display their awards. From left to right, Representative of winner Khadija Ismayilova, Four members of Operation Car Wash (Honourable Mention), Representative of Azza Soliman (Honourable Mention)
- Awarded for: Exceptional courage and leadership in combating corruption
- Location: Vancouver, Canada
- Presented by: Allard Prize Foundation / Allard Prize Committee / Peter A. Allard School of Law
- First award: 2013; 13 years ago
- Website: Allardprize.org

The Allard Prize for International Integrity is one of the world's largest prizes dedicated to the fight against corruption and the protection of human rights. The prize is awarded biennially to an individual, movement or organization that has "demonstrated exceptional courage and leadership in combating corruption, especially through promoting transparency, accountability and the Rule of Law." The winner receives the Allard Prize Award, a uniquely crafted brass artwork, and CAD$100,000. Honourable mention recipients are awarded a unique nickel-plated artwork, and may also receive a cash award.

At the 2017 Award Ceremony, Pulitzer Prize-winning journalist Glenn Greenwald stated that the Allard Prize “is important … and isn't devoted just to honouring anti-corruption crusaders, but to constructing and fortifying a framework that really does protect them and enables the work to proceed much more safely," and "this kind of courage can be very contagious." Past Allard Prize winners and others have said that the Allard Prize assists, supports and protects those working in anti-corruption and their work. Canada's National Observer calls The Allard Prize 'The Oscars of anti-corruption'.

The Allard Prize and Allard Prize Foundation, the charitable organization that supports the Allard Prize, were founded in 2011 and are funded by lawyer and businessman Peter A. Allard, Q.C. The Allard Prize Committee is responsible for the oversight, organization and selection of the Prize winner and honourable mention recipients. From 2013 until June 21, 2019, the Prize was administered at the Peter A. Allard School of Law at the University of British Columbia, Vancouver, Canada. The Allard Prize is now independent of UBC.

Some Allard Prize nominees and winners have previously been subjected to threats, violence, torture, imprisonment and other attacks associated with their anti-corruption and human rights activities. 2020 Allard Prize co-recipient Daphne Caruana Galizia and 2015 honourable mention recipient Sergei Magnitsky both received the Allard Prize posthumously. Maltese journalist Caruna-Galizia was assassinated by car bomb in 2017. Russian auditor Magnitsky died after being tortured in prison.

== Nomination and selection ==
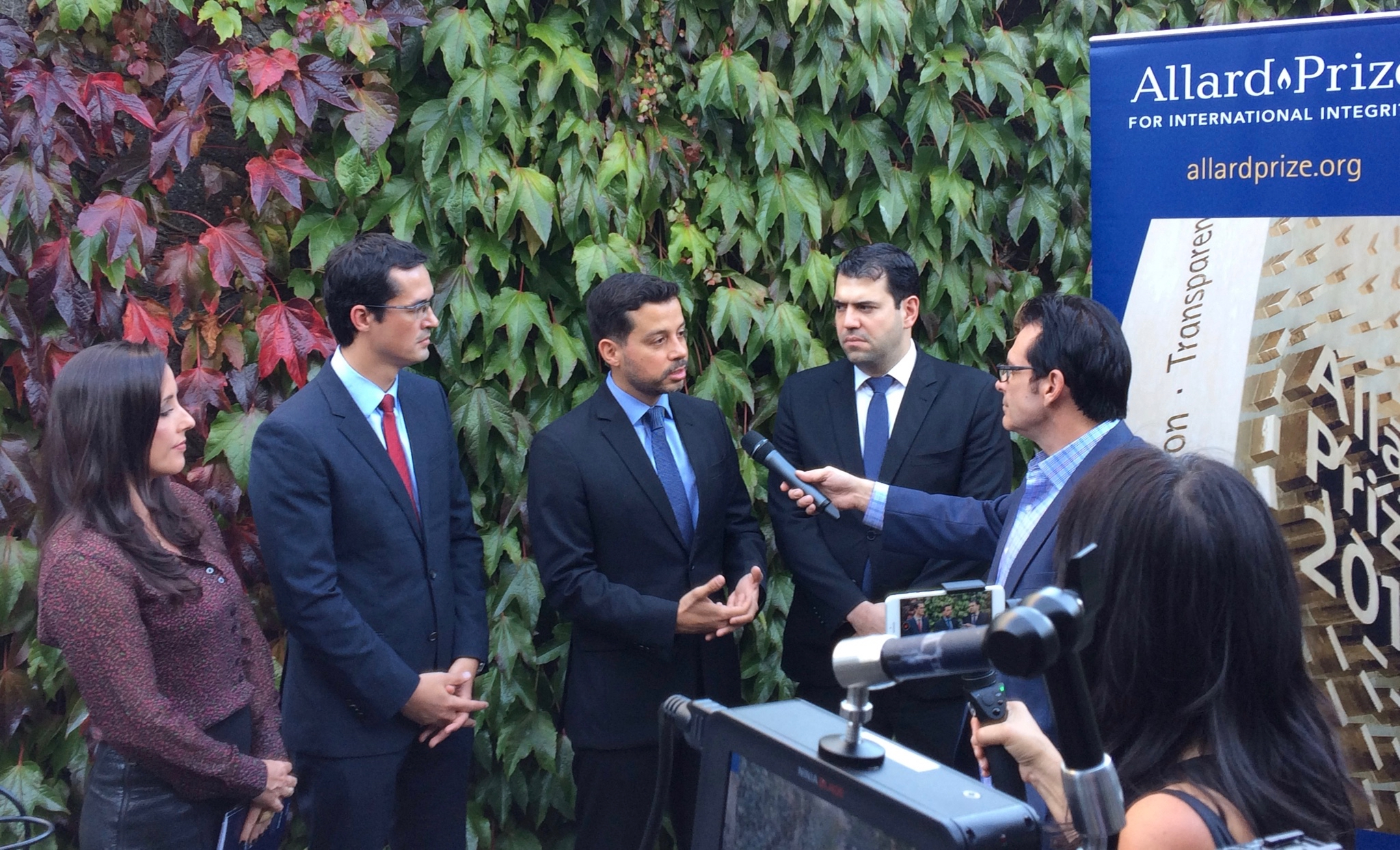
Political commentator Jimmy Dore of TYT Network interviews members of Operation Car Wash at the 2017 Allard Prize ceremony.

The Allard Prize winner and any honourable mention recipients are chosen through a comprehensive nomination and selection process involving the Allard Prize Committee, sub-committees and an advisory board. For the 2015 Allard Prize, over 140 people were nominated from 50 countries. In 2017, the number of nominations grew to 244 from 70 countries, with 42 nominations (17 percent) from North America. In 2020 there were 525 nominations received from 80 countries.

=== Nomination ===
There are no restrictions as to who may submit a nominee for consideration. Nominations may come from anywhere including from members of the Allard Prize Committee. Self-nominations are allowed for both individuals and organizations. Nominees range from neighbourhood activists to prominent world leaders, academics, social movements, political organizations and charitable groups.

Nominations are accepted on a rolling basis, with a new nomination cycle beginning with the announcement of finalists in the Prize year. Previously nominated candidates can be re-nominated, but new nomination forms must be submitted. There are no minimum or maximum age limits or any other limiting characteristics as to eligibility, with the exception that members of the Allard Prize Committee, Advisory Board and members of their immediate families may not be awarded the Allard Prize during their respective terms and for one year following the end of their terms.

=== Selection ===
The Allard Prize Committee reviews all nominations and is responsible for selecting the Prize winner and any honourable mention recipients. The selection process involves research, subcommittees and due diligence, two levels of short-listing, and a requirement to submit short-listed of nominees to the Allard Prize Advisory Board for review and comment prior to the selection of the winner and honourable mention recipients.

== Awarding the Prize ==
The 2015 and 2017 Allard Prize public awards ceremonies were held at the University of British Columbia's Old Auditorium and were live-streamed over the Internet. The 2020 Allard Prize Ceremony was conducted online only via live streaming from Vancouver, Canada due to the COVID-19 pandemic.

The list of Allard Prize 'finalists' is released approximately one month prior to the Prize Ceremony. The public announcement identifying the Allard Prize winner is made at the Prize Ceremony, typically held in September or October of the award year. Finalists attend the ceremony in Vancouver, British Columbia, Canada, and become part of the growing Allard Prize anti-corruption network. Travel expenses are paid by the Allard Prize. Past award ceremony keynote speakers include Canadian diplomat Stephen Lewis (2013), Lieutenant-General Roméo Dallaire (2015), Pulitzer Prize winning journalist Glenn Greenwald (2017)., and for the 2020 ceremony - Pulitzer Prize winning journalist Chris Hedges.

== List of Allard Prize Recipients and Honourable Mentions ==
As of 2020, the Allard Prize has been awarded to six individuals (one posthumously). Three organizations, one government office and three individuals (one posthumously) have received Honourable Mention.

Year	Name of Finalist	Recipient/Honourable Mention	Country	Rationale
2013	Anna Hazare	Recipient	India	At great personal risk, led successful movements to advance rural development, enhance government transparency and investigate and prosecute official corruption. He has also played a leading role in educating people in India about their fundamental rights and encouraging them to raise their voice against unlawful practices like corruption.
2013	Global Witness	Honourable Mention	United Kingdom	For courage and a relentless approach in efforts to tackle corruption and to promote transparency, expose the corrupt exploitation of natural resources and international trade systems, to drive campaigns that end impunity, resource linked conflict, and human rights and environmental abuses.
2013	Sima Samar	Honourable Mention	Afghanistan	At great personal risk, worked to raise global awareness about the detrimental impact of corruption on the promotion and protection of Afghan human and women's rights.
2015	John Githongo	Co-Recipient	Kenya	For courage and fighting against corruption and towards political transparency in Kenya.
2015	Rafael Marques De Morais	Co-Recipient	Angola	For courage and dedication in exposing corruption, murder and torture in Angola especially relating to Blood Diamonds and government corruption.
2015	Indonesia Corruption Watch	Honourable Mention	Indonesia	For courage and dedication to providing political pressure for policy reform, transparency, and accountability of government through bringing cases of corruption to law enforcement agencies, monitoring campaign and political finance spending in national and local elections and pushing for improved anti-corruption laws such as the Freedom of Information Act, the Whistleblower Protection Act, Anti-corruption Act and Election Act.
2015	Sergei Magnitsky	Honourable Mention (Awarded Posthumously)	Russia	After exposing a $230 million tax fraud involving Russian organized crime, police and government officials, Sergei Magnitsky courageously refused to retract his evidence. Russian officials falsely accused and arrested Magnitsky, who was imprisoned for over 11 months in pre-trial detention. His arrest, torture and in-prison death garnered the attention of international government bodies, parliaments and human rights organizations.
2017	Khadija Ismayilova	Recipient	Azerbaijan	For courage and leadership in the fight against human rights abuses and corrupt practices in government, and for inspiring a new age of political activism in Azerbaijan at great personal risk.
2017	Azza Soliman	Honourable Mention	Egypt	For courage and leadership, fighting at great personal risk for the inclusion of women in political, economic and social activities, and in access to justice.
2017	Operation Car Wash (Força Tarefa da Lava Jato)	Honourable Mention	Brazil	The Car Wash Task Force has been responsible for billions of dollars in recovered bribes, and criminal charges against hundreds of political and corporate operatives, changing the nature of Brazilian politics and its culture of criminal impunity.
2019	William Binney (intelligence official)	Lifetime Achievement Award	United States	Allard Prize Lifetime Achievement Award for leadership and commitment to protecting human rights and combatting corruption.
2020	Daphne Caruana Galizia	Co-Recipient (Awarded Posthumously)	Malta	For leadership and commitment to protecting human rights and combatting corruption. Despite years of threats & acts of violence against her and her family, journalist Daphne Caruana Galizia courageously continued investigating government corruption and organized crime. She was assassinated with a car-bomb in 2017.
2020	Howard Wilkinson (whistleblower)	Co-Recipient	United Kingdom	For leadership and commitment to protecting human rights and combatting corruption. While working at the Danske Bank, Howard Wilkinson uncovered one of the largest money laundering schemes in history involving over 200 Billion Euros. Despite the considerable risk to himself & his family, Wilkinson testified before European Parliament - advocating for greater protections for whistleblowers and a new regulation model for greater transparency. The scandal led to investigations & criminal charges across Europe, Danske's CEO's resignation, & Danske's Estonian branch's closing.
2020	International Commission against Impunity in Guatemala	Honourable Mention	Guatemala	The International Commission against Impunity in Guatemala (CICIG) operated in Guatemala for 12 years and helped prosecute over 120 cases. CICIG also pursued critical reforms to improve accountability measures, strengthening citizens’ trust in domestic judicial institutions.
2025	Virginia Laparra	Recipient	Guatemala	In recognition of her exceptional courage and commitment to combating corruption and defending the rule of law.
	Andréa Ngombet	Honourable Mention	Republic of the Congo	For his courage and leadership in confronting kleptocracy and defending democratic values.
	Abdalle Mumin	Honourable Mention	Somalia	In recognition of his courage and commitment to press freedom and human rights.

== Controversies ==
=== Protest against selection of finalist Operação Lava Jato (Brazil - Car Wash Task Force) - 2017 ===
The selection of Brazil's Car Wash Task Force (Operação Lava Jato) as a 2017 Allard Prize finalist triggered objections in Brazil and Canada. A group of Brazilian lawyers wrote to the Allard Prize Committee demanding the Committee rescind their finalist status and alleging "numerous abuses, arbitrariness and legal violations" by the Task Force. A group of University of British Columbia faculty and students supported the Brazilian lawyer group. During the September 28, 2017 Prize Ceremony, several audience members made vocal outbursts against the Car Wash Task Force.

In response, 2017 Allard Prize keynote speaker Glenn Greenwald said in his keynote address that while the Operation Car Wash Task Force had made some mistakes, powerful investigative work often creates controversy and enemies. In a post-award open discussion at the Allard School of Law, opponents confronted the Task Force's lead prosecutor Deltan Dallagnol with their criticisms, who responded during a recorded video session.

=== Allegation of Third World Bias ===
Shortly after the 2017 Allard Prize finalists were announced, journalist Russell Mokhiber noted in an article published in Corporate Crime Reporter that the Allard Prize has "a bias in favour of anti-corruption fighters in the Third World" rather than selecting nominees from Western developed countries. Mokhiber speculated that the bias might be due to a heavy representation of corporate lawyers, World Bank and Asian Development Bank personnel on the selection and advisory committees. In an interview with Mokhiber, Allard Prize Executive Director Nicole Barrett acknowledged that none of the previous finalists have been from North America. Noting that the majority of nominees are from the developing world, she said that the Allard Prize may consider developing a formal requirement of geographical balance to address this concern.

== Photography and video competitions ==
The Allard Prize Committee also adjudicates the bi-annual Allard Photography Competition and the Allard Video Competition. Both competitions align with the ideals of the Allard Prize of combating corruption and protecting human rights.

In November 2018, one of the winners of the Photography Competition was Darrin Zammit Lupi whose winning photograph titled Justice for Daphne showed a vigil and protest calling for justice in the case of Maltese journalist Daphne Caruana Galizia who was murdered in 2017. Caruana Galizia was awarded the Allard Prize posthumously in 2020.
