= Hamid Ghassemi-Shall =

Iranian-Canadian computer technician (born 1967)

- Born: Circa 1967; Iran
- Occupation: Shoe salesman
- Criminal charge: Espionage
- Criminal penalty: Death (later reduced to five years imprisonment)
- Criminal status: Released (along with 80 prisoners)
- Spouse: Antonella Mega

Hamid Ghassemi-Shall (Persian: حمید قاسمی-شال) (born circa 1967) is an Iranian-Canadian computer technician who was arrested by Iran on espionage charges in 2008 and sentenced to death the following year. The Canadian government and senate called for a stay of execution, and Amnesty International began a letter-writing campaign on his behalf.

He was freed in 2013, and returned to Toronto the same year.

== Background ==
Born in Iran, Ghassemi-Shall moved to Canada in 1990 following the Islamic Revolution. He holds citizenship in both countries. He met his future wife, Italian-Canadian Antonella Mega, in 1995 while working at a shoe store in Toronto, and married her within the year.

== Espionage conviction ==
Ghassemi-Shall traveled to Iran in May 2008 to visit his mother, who was unwell. He had last traveled to the country in 2004, on the first anniversary of his father's death. While Ghassemi-Shall was in Iran, his older brother Alborz was arrested, and Ghassemi-Shall's Canadian passport was seized along with other family documents. Ghassemi-Shall reported to the police station at the end of the month to retrieve his passport, but was also arrested.

In late 2009, Ghassemi-Shall was convicted of espionage for Mujahideen e-Khalq (MEK). The basis of the charge was an e-mail he allegedly sent to Alborz requesting information on the MEK's behalf. Ghassemi-Shall's family has denied that such an e-mail was written or sent.

Initially told his sentence would be life imprisonment, Ghassemi-Shall was later sentenced to death by an Iranian court. Alborz died in Evin prison in January 2010. Iranian authorities attributed the death to stomach cancer, while a Toronto Sun reporter called the circumstances of the death "mysterious".

According to Ghassemi-Shall's wife, he spent nineteen months in solitary confinement and had been physically abused by his guards. Despite his dual citizenship, he was also denied visits from the Canadian consulate.

In April 2012, Ghassemi-Shall's sister was told that his execution was imminent.

Persian media sources reported on September 23, 2013, that Ghassemi-Shall was released after his sentence was reduced from death to five years imprisonment. He was released after having served five years and four months, and returned to Canada on October 10.

== Campaigns on Ghassemi-Shall's behalf ==
Ghassesmi-Shall's wife Antonella Mega has traveled around Canada to speak in her husband's support. As of May 2012, she had applied for an Iranian visa to travel to Tehran to plead for his compassionate release. Ghassemi-Shall has also been the subject of several viral social media campaigns. In April 2012, Amnesty International began a letter-writing campaign on Ghassemi-Shall's behalf, urging the Iranian government to halt his execution; grant him access to his family, a lawyer, and medical treatment; and retry him in accordance with international norms for a fair trial.

In a February 2012 debate, Canadian senator Linda Frum expressed concern for Ghassemi-Shall's case, stating that he had "endured 18 months of solitary confinement and has been subjected to physical and psychological torture". Following reports that Ghassemi-Shall's execution was impending, Prime Minister Stephen Harper threatened the Iranian government with "consequences" if Ghassemi-Shall was killed, saying: "the government of Iran should know that the whole world will be watching, and they will cast judgement if terrible and inappropriate things are done in this case." Minister of Foreign Affairs John Baird and Minister of State of Foreign Affairs Diane Ablonczy stated that "Canada urgently appeals to the government of the Islamic Republic of Iran to grant clemency to Mr Ghassemi-Shall on compassionate and humanitarian grounds. We urge Iran to reverse its current course and to adhere to its international human rights obligations." The House of Commons of Canada issued a unanimous call for his release on May 30. His sentence was also protested by the U.S., U.K., Brazil, and Turkey.

However, the Canadian government reportedly wielded little influence in Iran after the 2003 death of journalist Zahra Kazemi worsened relations between the two countries. A columnist for The Globe and Mail described Ghassemi-Shall as a "hostage" taken by the Iranian government for unclear demands. Royal Military College Iranian studies expert Houchang Hassan-Yari described the Ghassemi-Shall's arrest as a "pressure tactic" by the Iranian government in retaliation for criticism by Canada of Iran's record on human rights.

== See also ==
- Canada–Iran relations
- List of foreign nationals detained in Iran
- Saeed Malekpour
