= Magnitsky legislation =

Sanctions against foreign individuals

Countries that have passed Magnitsky legislation

Magnitsky legislation refers to laws providing for governmental sanctions against foreign individuals who have committed human rights abuses or been involved in significant corruption. They originated with the United States which passed the first Magnitsky legislation in 2012, following the torture and death of Sergei Magnitsky in Russia in 2009. Since then, a number of countries have passed similar legislation such as Canada, the United Kingdom and the European Union.

== Background ==
In 2008, Sergei Magnitsky was a tax accountant who accused Russian tax officials and law enforcement of stealing $230 million (~$337 million in 2025) in tax rebates from Hermitage Capital. He, in turn, was arrested and jailed under the accusation of aiding tax evasion. Allegedly beaten by police, Magnitsky died in Matrosskaya Tishina detention facility in November 2009. In 2012, the United States Congress passed the Magnitsky Act, which imposed sanctions on the officials involved, following extensive lobbying by Magnitsky's former employer Bill Browder.

== Magnitsky legislation by country ==
Following the United States, Magnitsky legislation has been enacted in a number of territories, including the United Kingdom, Estonia, Canada, Lithuania, Latvia, Gibraltar, Jersey, and Kosovo.

=== United States ===
The original Magnitsky Act of 2012 was expanded in 2016 into a more general law authorizing the US government to sanction those found to be human rights offenders or those involved in significant corruption, to freeze their assets, and to ban them from entering the US.

=== Canada ===
Justice for Victims of Corrupt Foreign Officials Act (Sergei Magnitsky Law)
- Long title: An Act to provide for the taking of restrictive measures in respect of foreign nationals responsible for gross violations of internationally recognized human rights and to make related amendments to the Special Economic Measures Act and the Immigration and Refugee Protection Act
- Citation: S.C. 2017, c. 21
- Assented to by: Governor General Julie Payette
- Assented to: 18 October 2017

Legislative history
- Bill citation: Bill S-226
- Introduced by: Sen. Raynell Andreychuk
- First reading: 4 May 2016
- Second reading: 17 November 2016
- Third reading: 11 April 2017
- Committee report: Eighth Report of the Standing Senate Committee on Foreign Affairs and International Trade
- First reading: 13 April 2017
- Second reading: 13 June 2017
- Third reading: 4 October 2017
- Status: Current legislation

In October 2017, Canada passed its own Magnitsky legislation known as the Justice for Victims of Corrupt Foreign Officials Act, which the Parliament of Canada passed through a motion in March 2015. The Act enables targeted measures against foreign nationals who, according to the Governor in Council (GIC), are, among others, "responsible for or complicit in gross violations of human rights; or are public officials or an associate of such an official, who are responsible for or complicit in acts of significant corruption."

The regulations pursuant to the Act prohibit individuals and entities in Canada, as well as Canadians outside Canada, from, among others:

- "Dealing, directly or indirectly, in any property, wherever situated, of the listed foreign national;"
- "Entering into or facilitating, directly or indirectly, any financial transaction related to a dealing described above;"
- "Providing or acquiring financial or other related services to, for the benefit of, or on the direction or order of the listed foreign national;" and
- "Making available any property, wherever situated, to the listed foreign national or to a person acting on behalf of the listed foreign national."

Canada's sanctions under this Act are enforced by the Royal Canadian Mounted Police and the Canada Border Services Agency, who also enforce related legislations such as the United Nations Act and the Special Economic Measures Act.

The Immigration and Refugee Protection Act (IRPA) provides the legislative authority for the Canadian government to deny entries to foreign nationals who are inadmissible to Canada pursuant to sanctions under the Act

Russian president Vladimir Putin accused Canada of "political games" over the new Magnitsky law. As such, the Act is perceived as damaging relations with Russia, especially with earlier warnings from the Russian Ministry of Foreign Affairs that the law would be a "blatantly unfriendly step." Russia had already placed Canada's former Foreign Minister, Chrystia Freeland, and 12 other Canadian politicians and activists on a Kremlin 'blacklist', barring them entry to "Russia because of their criticism of Russian actions in Ukraine and its annexation of Crimea," under the equivalent Russian law.

Along with 30 Russian individuals, Canada's government subsequently targeted sanctions against 19 Venezuelan officials (including President Nicolás Maduro) and 3 South Sudanese officials. On 29 November 2018, Canada amended the Regulations to include 17 foreign nationals from Saudi Arabia, who, in the opinion of the GIC, are responsible for or complicit in blatant violations of internationally recognized human rights, particularly the torture and extrajudicial killing of Saudi journalist Jamal Khashoggi. On 16 February 2018, Canada announced its sanctioning of Major-General Maung Maung Soe for being a "key military official" in Myanmar's human-rights violations against the Rohingya and the resulting flight of 688,000 Rohingya from their country.

Sanctioned individuals include:

- 30 Russian officials
- 19 Venezuelan officials, including
  - President Nicolás Maduro Moros
  - Tareck El Aissami
  - Gustavo Enrique González López
  - Adán Chávez Frías
  - Rafael Darío Ramírez Carreño
  - Luis Alfredo Motta Domínguez
  - Nelson José Merentes Díaz
  - Rodolfo Clemente Marco Torres
  - Francisco José Rangel Gómez
- 17 Saudi nationals, including
  - Saud Al-Qahtani
  - Salah Mohammed Tubaigy
- 3 Sudanese officials
  - Paul Malong Awan
  - Malek Reuben Riak Rengu
  - Michael Makuei Lueth
- 1 Burmese official
  - Maung Maung Soe

On 21 March 2021, the Government of Canada promulgated the "Special Economic Measures (People’s Republic of China) Regulations" under a related legislation, the Special Economic Measures Act, on the basis that "gross and systematic human rights violations have been committed in the People’s Republic of China". Individuals sanctioned under this Regulation include Zhu Hailun, Wang Junzheng, Wang Mingshan, Chen Mingguo and Xinjiang Production and Construction Corps.

=== In Europe ===
==== Czech Republic ====
On 16 October 2022, the Czech Parliament approved Magnitsky legislation to act independently of the European Union's Magnistky sanctions. A particular concern was the Hungarian government of Viktor Orban, which has expressed pro-Russian sentiments and has managed to slow down EU-wide sanctions. Czechia is the fourth EU state (not including the United Kingdom, which passed a Magnitsky law before Brexit) to pass such legislation, after Estonia, Latvia, and Lithuania, and this legislation will provide a legal basis for the Czech government to sanction human rights abusers.

==== European Union ====
The European Parliament passed a resolution in March 2019 to urge EU and 28 member states to legislate similar with Magnitsky Act.

On 9 December 2019, the EU Foreign Affairs and Security Policy High Representative Josep Borrell, who is the chief co-ordinator and representative of the Common Foreign and Security Policy (CFSP) within the EU, announced that all member states had "agreed to launch the preparatory work for a global sanctions regime to address serious human rights violations, which will be the European Union equivalent of the so-called Magnitsky Act of the United States."

On 7 December 2020, the European Union passed the European Magnitsky Act, which will allow the organization to "freeze assets and impose travel bans on individuals involved in serious human rights abuses".

Among the criteria for sanctions are: genocide, crimes against humanity, torture, slavery, extrajudicial killings, arbitrary arrests, or detentions. The act establishes the following procedure to impose sanctions. Entitled to submit proposals for sanctions implementations, review or amendment are each of the member states and also the High Representative of the EU for Foreign Affairs and Security Policy. The decision is to be taken by the Council of the European Union.

==== Estonia ====
On 8 December 2016, Estonia introduced a new law that disallowed foreigners convicted of human rights abuses from entering Estonia. The law, which was passed unanimously in the Estonian Parliament, states that it entitles Estonia to disallow entry to people if, among other things, "there is information or good reason to believe" that they took part in activities which resulted in the "death or serious damage to health of a person."

==== Gibraltar ====
In March 2018, Gibraltar passed Magnitsky legislation.

==== Jersey ====
Jersey passed its Sanctions and Asset Freezing (Jersey) Law (SAFL) in December 2018, going into effect on 19 July 2019. The new law reincorporated the effects of the previous Terrorist Asset-Freezing (Jersey) Law 2011 (TAFL) and the United Nations Financial Sanctions (Jersey) Law 2017 (UNFSL), which it repealed.

==== Kosovo ====
On 29 January 2020, Kosovo passed its Magnitsky law, which was announced by Foreign Minister Behgjet Pacolli on Twitter.

==== Lithuania ====
On 16 November 2017, the 8th anniversary of Sergei Magnitsky's death, the Parliament of Lithuania (Seimas) unanimously passed their version of Magnitsky legislation.

==== Latvia ====
On 8 February 2018, the Parliament of Latvia (Saeima) accepted attachment of a law of sanctions, inspired by the Sergei Magnitsky case, to ban foreigners deemed guilty of human rights abuses from entering the country.

==== United Kingdom ====
On 21 February 2017, the UK House of Commons unanimously passed an amendment to the country's Criminal Finances Bill inspired by the Magnitsky Act that would allow the government to freeze the assets of international human rights violators in the UK.

On 1 May 2018, without opposition, the Commons added the "Magnitsky amendment" to the Sanctions and Anti-Money Laundering Bill, which would allow the British government to impose sanctions on people who commit gross human rights violations.

=== Australia ===
Member of Parliament Michael Danby introduced a Magnitsky bill in the Australian parliament in December 2018 but was lapsed in April 2019.

In December 2019, the Australian Minister for Foreign Affairs, Marise Payne, asked the Joint Standing Committee on Foreign Affairs, Defence and Trade Human Rights Sub-committee to inquire into the use of targeted sanctions to address human rights abuses. In 2020, the Australian Department of Foreign Affairs and Trade was asked about the possibility of Australia stopping the issuance of visas to Huawei Technologies employees for their complicity in China's human-rights violations, including in Xinjiang. The department stated that the inquiry into setting up Magnitsky-like rules was due to report to later in the year. Meanwhile, Australia was urged by the Bill Browder, who lobbied the U.S. Magnitsky Act into Congress, to pass its own Magnitsky law or "risks becoming "a magnet for dirty money" from abusers and kleptocrats across the globe"

In December 2020, the Joint Standing Committee tabled its report and recommended that the Australian Government "enact stand alone targeted sanctions legislation to address human rights violations and corruption, similar to the United States' Magnitsky Act 2012 which provides for sanctions targeted at individuals rather than existing sanctions regimes which are more often directed at states". In August 2021, the Australian Government announced that it would adopt a sanctions law similar to the U.S. Magnitsky Act that allows targeted financial sanctions and travel bans against individuals for egregious acts of international concern that could include the proliferation of weapons of mass destruction, gross human rights violations, malicious cyber activity, and serious corruption. Australia would reform its laws to expand country-based sanctions and specify the conduct to which sanctions could be applied by the end of the year. Similar Magnitsky private member bills had also been introduced by Labor's Kimberley Kitching and Greens' Janet Rice. The government's legislation, introduced and passed in November 2021 and named Autonomous Sanctions Amendment (Magnitsky-style and Other Thematic Sanctions) Act 2021, commenced on 8 December 2021.

In February and March 2022, in response to Russia's invasion of Ukraine, Australia initially did not use the new law but instead used other pre-existing sanction laws to impose travel and financial sanctions on Russian individuals and entities. However, Australia used its Magnitsky law for the first time on 29 March 2022 to sanction 39 Russian individuals "accused of serious corruption and involvement in the death and abuse" of Magnitsky.

== Russian response ==
In 2012, the Russian government responded to the new American Magnitsky Act by passing the Dima Yakovlev Law (long title: On Sanctions for Individuals Violating Fundamental Human Rights and Freedoms of the Citizens of the Russian Federation); banning Americans from adopting Russian children; and providing for sanctions against U.S. citizens involved in violations of the human rights and freedoms of Russian citizens.

== Pending legislation ==
Magnitsky legislation is under consideration in a number of countries.

=== Moldova ===
In July 2018, a Magnitsky bill was introduced into the Moldovan parliament, mandating sanctions against individuals who "have committed or contributed to human rights violations and particularly serious acts of corruption that are harmful to international political and economic stability." As of January 2020, it had not been acted upon; however, the DA Platform party is still pushing for its adoption, although the ACUM coalition has dropped its demand for passage.

=== Ukraine ===
In December 2017, there was a Magnitsky bill introduced into the Ukrainian parliament. The bill would have given authority to sanction foreign individuals who grossly violate human rights through the use of visa bans, asset freezes, and restrictions on asset transfer. However the bill was quickly tabled, and in September 2018, it was removed from the legislative agenda.
