= Darrin Zammit Lupi =

Maltese photographer and photojournalist (born 1968)

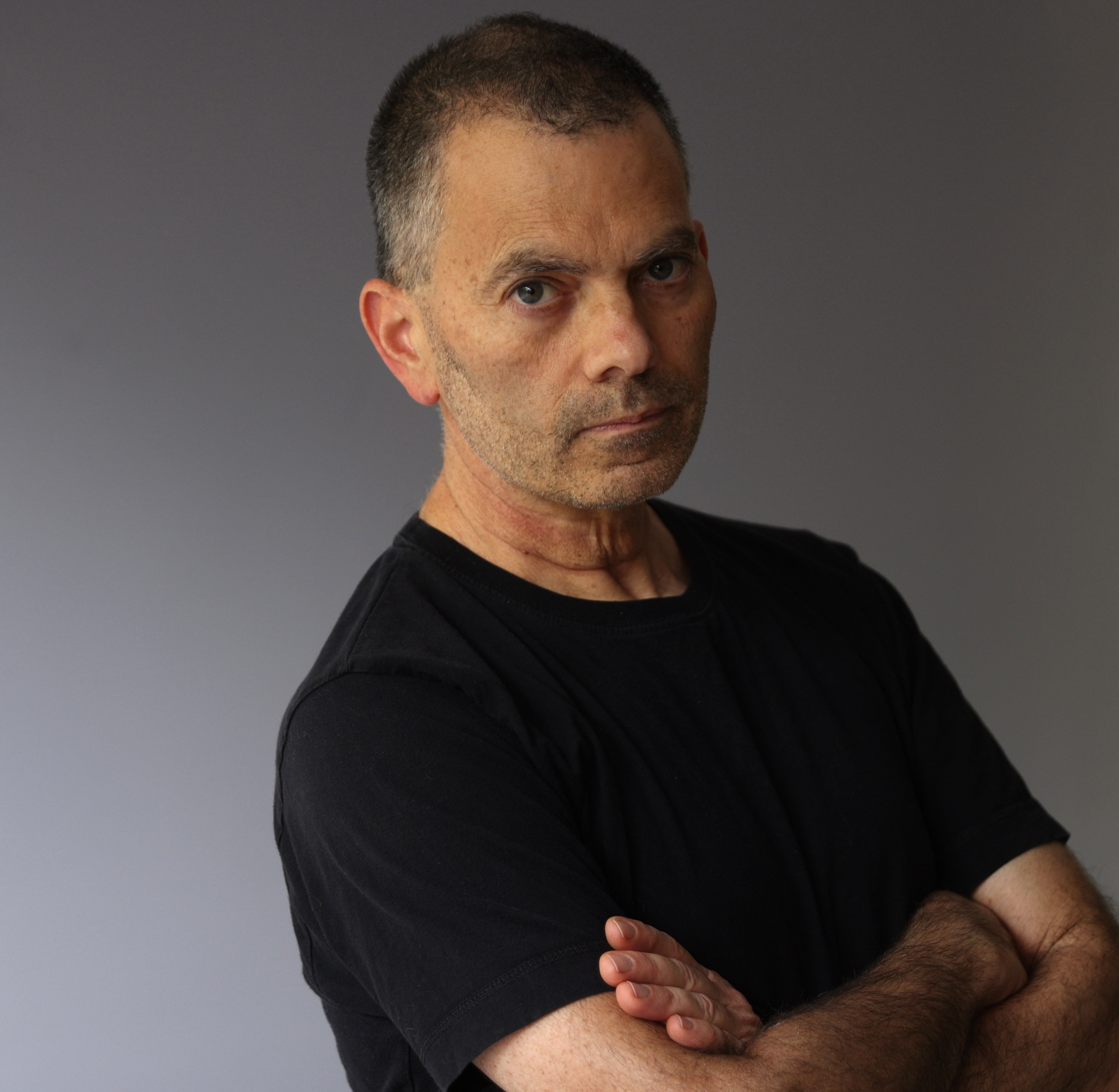
Darrin Zammit Lupi

Darrin Zammit Lupi (born 1968) is a Maltese photographer and journalist.

== Biography ==
Zammit Lupi was born in 1968 in Malta. He began his career as a photographer with The Malta Independent newspaper in 1992, but shortly thereafter became a freelance photographer. He studied at the University of the Arts London from which he earned a master's degree in Photojournalism and Documentary photography.

In 1996, Zammit Lupi started working as a photographer with the Times of Malta, and in the following year, he became a freelance correspondent for Reuters. His work documents the migration crisis in the Mediterranean, the devastating Tsunamis of Southeast Asia, the Millennium Development Goals in different areas of Africa, the 2009 L'Aquila earthquake, the Costa Concordia disaster, the Libyan conflict, and other international events.

== Works ==
Zammit Lupi has published two books, Isle Landers and Off the Job.

Isle Landers was published in 2014. It is composed of photos taken by Zammit Lupi from 2005 to 2014 regarding the migratory situation in the Mediterranean. In these photos, Zammit Lupi photographed the migrants from their rescue at sea, upon arrival in Europe at the immigration centres, until their departure. The purpose of the book is to combat racism and xenophobia and raise awareness of the international public about the struggles of African and Middle Eastern migrants.

Off the Job was published in 2015 and is composed of photos taken with an iPhone by Zammit Lupi in non-working contexts. Lupi prefers the iPhone when taking photos for pleasure; according to him, "it is the ideal way to recharge my creative energies".

== Awards ==
2026	Gold Medal Award	Malta Society of Arts
2023	Refugee Festival honorary prize for long-term documentation	Supported by the Norwegian Arts Council and held at the House of Literature in Oslo, Norway, the festival’s organiser is Maltese-Norwegian Kristina Quintano
2022	Lifetime Achievement Award	Malta National Photography Awards (Premju Fotografija)
2021	“Yannis Behrakis” International Photojournalism Award	Athens Photo World
2018	Allard Prize Photography Competition	Peter A. Allard School of Law at the University of British Columbia
2018	Nominato – Taylor Wessing Photographic Portrait Prize	Taylor Wessing
2017	Mediterranean Journalist Award	Anna Lindh Foundation
2016	Photographer of the Year	The Societies of Photographers
2016	Street Photography Photographer of the Year	The Societies of Photographers
2014	Documentary Photographer of the Year	The Societies of Photographers
2013	Media Photographer of the Year	The Societies of Photographers
2008	Il secondo nel concorso fotografico "Waterways of Life"	OSCE

== See also ==
- European migrant crisis
