= Posthumous trial =

Trial held after the defendant's death

A posthumous trial or post-mortem trial is a trial held after the defendant's death. Posthumous trials can be held for a variety of reasons, including the legal declaration that the defendant was the one who committed the crime, to provide justice for society or family members of the victims, or to exonerate a wrongfully convicted person after their death.

Due to the obvious difficulties both of the defendant to mount a capable defence, as well as of effectively imposing any penalties (other than against the estate, such as damages) the practice is generally considered more as a method of providing closure for the case in question. In Swedish procedural law, for instance, a criminal defendant can be tried after death only following conviction by a district (or appeal) court if there has been an appeal or if the relatives lodge an appeal on behalf of the deceased; typically in the interest of clearing the name through posthumous acquittal. As penalties, including fines, are immediately rescinded upon conviction, only the question of guilt or innocence is effectively established. Should a defendant die during appeal after acquitted, the acquittal automatically stands, regardless of the offence or evidence concerned.

== Notable posthumous trials ==
- Cadaver Synod of Pope Formosus
- Farinata degli Uberti
- Pope Boniface VIII
- Retrial of Joan of Arc, overturned her earlier heresy conviction
- Francesco Maria Carafa, resulting in exoneration
- The Wanli Emperor, seized and denounced by Beijing's Red Guards in 1966
- Wu Xun
- Henry Plummer, resulting in a mistrial.
- Saint Genevieve
- Martin Bormann, as part of the main Nuremberg Trials, formally in absentia, death confirmed in 1973
- Shin Ukkattha
- Sergei Magnitsky

== See also ==
- Posthumous execution
- Kangaroo court
- Trial in absentia
- Declared death in absentia
- Show trial
