= Centre for Human Rights and Democracy in Africa =

- Abbreviation: CHRDA
- Location: Cameroon, Sierra Leone, United States
- Key people: Felix Agbor Balla
- Website: Official website
- Formerly called: Centre for Human Rights and Democracy in Cameroon

The Centre for Human Rights and Democracy in Africa (CHRDA) is a human rights organisation documenting human rights violations and promoting human rights improvements in Africa, with a particular focus on Cameroon, where the organisation started.

== History ==
The CHRDA started as a Cameroonian human rights organisation called the Centre for Human Rights and Democracy in Cameroon. In 2005, after discussions with colleagues from other parts of Africa and from the United States (US), the group added regional offices in Sierra Leone and the US, and changed its name to the Centre for Human Rights and Democracy in Africa.

== Anglophone Crisis ==
The CHRDA is well known for its documentation of human rights violations during the Anglophone Crisis, a civil war involving the Southern Cameroons region of Cameroon that started in 2017. In August 2018, the CHRDA published a list of 106 villages that had been raided and burnt down by Cameroonian government forces since October 2017. Citing eyewitness accounts, videos and photos as evidence, the CHRDA claimed that the 106 villages had been "attacked, burned down partially or completely and either fully or partially deserted".

In May 2019, CHRDA together with the Montreal-based Raoul Wallenberg Centre for Human Rights claimed that human rights violations in the Anglophone crisis constituted crimes against humanity.
