= Abdalle Mumin =

Somali journalist

Abdalla Mumin
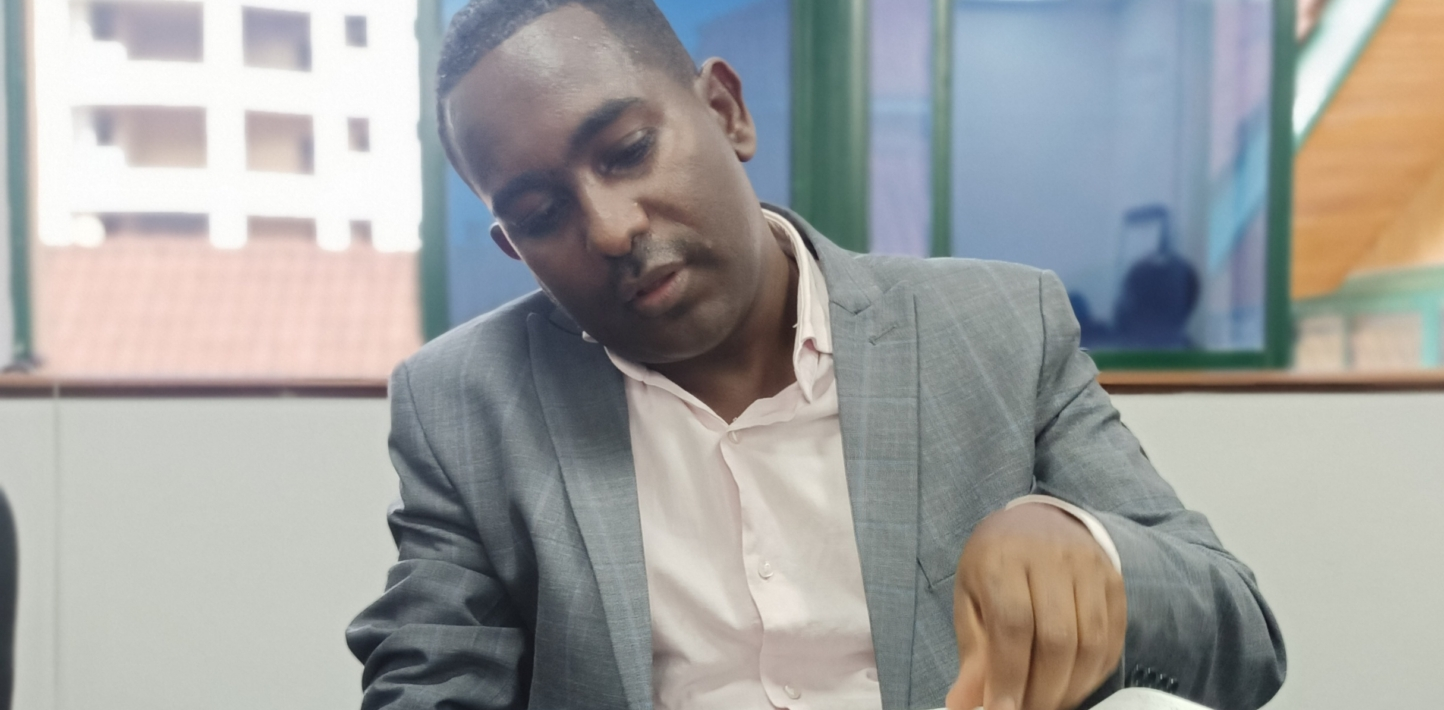
- Born: 1986
- Occupation: Journalist

Abdalle Ahmed Mumin is a Somalian journalist, human rights activist, and contributor to the book Hounded: African Journalists in Exile. He is currently Secretary General of the Somali Journalists Syndicate and a writer for The Guardian. On October 11, he was arrested as he waited for a flight to Nairobi and taken to Godka Jila’ow, a detention facilities. He was held for three days there by the Somalian authority for an "offensive against Islamic militants" in the east African region and was later released on bail after 10 days of police custody on October 22.

He survived an attack in early 2015 after reporting for The Wall Street Journal on the killing of al-Shabaab's leader.
