= Saeed Malekpour =

Canadian-Iranian imprisoned in Iran

- سعید ملک‌پور
- Born: May 1975 (age 51); Iran
- Education: Sharif University of Technology
- Occupation: Web developer
- Known for: Arrest in Iran, death sentence (later suspended)
- Criminal charges: Designing and moderating adult content websites; Agitation against the [Iranian] regime; Insulting the sanctity of Islam
- Criminal penalty: Death
- Criminal status: Furloughed

Saeed Malekpour (Persian: سعید ملک‌پور; born May 1975) is an Iranian web designer. He was sentenced to death in Iran for allegedly designing and moderating pornographic websites. Malekpour developed an Internet photo-sharing tool that his supporters assert was used without his knowledge for pornographic purposes. Prior to his arrest in Iran in 2008, Malekpour had been living and working in Canada as a permanent resident. The Canadian government and Amnesty International have called for his immediate release.

In December 2012, Malekpour's lawyer announced that the death sentence had been suspended because Malekpour had repented for his behavior.

On 3 August 2019, Malekpour returned to Canada after escaping Iran through an unknown third country.

== Life ==
Malekpour was born in Iran in May 1975. He is a graduate of the Sharif University of Technology in Tehran, where he earned a degree in metallurgical engineering. Among the jobs he held in Iran, he worked for Iran Khodro, the country's largest automaker. In Iran, Malekpour married Fatima Eftekhari whom he met at a chess competition.

In 2004, Malekpour went to Canada with his wife to pursue educational opportunities. He became a permanent resident of Canada and from 2005 worked as a website designer in the country. Malekpour and his wife resided in Richmond Hill, Ontario.

== Legal issues ==
In October 2008, Malekpour visited his dying father in Iran; he was about to enroll in a master's program at the University of Victoria in British Columbia.

Iranian authorities arrested Malekpour during his visit, accusing him of designing and moderating pornographic websites. Malekpour had designed photo uploading software, and according to his supporters, that software was being used without his knowledge for the creation of an adult website.

Malekpour has been kept in Iran's Evin prison, and was initially placed for almost a year in solitary confinement without legal representation. A year after his arrest, Malekpour confessed to his crimes on Iranian state television. He later retracted the confession in letter sent from inside prison. Malekpour wrote, "A large portion of my confession was extracted under pressure, physical and psychological torture, threats to myself and my family, and false promises of immediate release upon giving a false confession to whatever the interrogators dictated ... Such mistreatment was aimed at forcing me to write what the interrogators were dictating, and to compel me to play a role in front of the camera based on their scenarios."

=== First death sentence ===
In December 2010, Malekpour was sentenced to death after being found guilty of "designing and moderating adult content websites", "agitation against the regime", and "insulting the sanctity of Islam". In June 2011, however, the Supreme Court of Iran reportedly annulled the verdict in the face of Canadian government protests. Following the reversal, Malekpour was set to remain in jail while a judicial review into his case was held.

=== Second death sentence ===
Despite its earlier decision, the Supreme Court announced its verdict was inconclusive and remanded the case to the court that originally sentenced Malekpour. The death sentence was upheld, and in January 2012, the Supreme Court rejected an appeal from Malekpour's lawyers. The Canadian government condemned the decision and called for Malekpour's immediate release. Amnesty International also called for his release, describing the case as part of a general "crackdown on freedom of expression ahead of the Iranian parliamentary elections in March".

=== Suspension of death sentence ===
In December 2012, Malekpour's lawyer announced that the death sentence had been suspended because Malekpour had "repented for his actions".

=== Escape and return to Canada ===
On 3 August 2019, Malekpour returned to Canada after being released by Iranian authorities on furlough 'a few days ago' and escaped Iran through a third country that is not being revealed.

== See also ==
- Canada–Iran relations
- List of foreign nationals detained in Iran
- Hamid Ghassemi-Shall
