= Hermitage Capital Management =

Investment fund and asset management company

- Industry: Investment management
- Founded: 1996
- Founders: Bill Browder and Edmond Safra
- Headquarters: Guernsey
- Area served: Worldwide

Hermitage Capital Management is an investment fund and asset management company specializing in Russian markets founded by Bill Browder and Edmond Safra. Chief operating officer is Ivan Cherkasov. Hermitage Capital Management headquarters are in Guernsey; it also maintains offices in the Cayman Islands, London and Moscow.

Its main investment fund, the Hermitage Fund created in 1996, was rated as extremely successful after earning 2,697% between 1996 and December 2007.

Hermitage describes itself as an activist fund. Its tactics include the exposure of corporate corruption in the companies it is holding, in the hope of improving managerial behaviour and lessening the significant discount that corruption has on share prices. Most famously, Hermitage has helped to expose several high-profile cases of corruption in Russia's largest company Gazprom between 1998 and 2000. In October 2000, Hermitage reported that "investors are valuing this company as if 99 percent of its assets have been stolen. The real figure is around 10 percent so that's good news."

In April 2007, the firm launched Hermitage Global, an activist fund focused on global emerging markets.

Since 2015, Hermitage has operated as a family office hedge fund based in London, having returned outside capital to investors. The focus of the fund is still in emerging markets.

== Conflict with Russian government ==
Although the fund's founder William Browder was a supporter of Russian president Vladimir Putin, in November 2005 he was blacklisted by the Russian government as a "threat to national security" and denied entry to the country. According to publication in The Economist, the fund was blacklisted because its management interfered with the flow of money to "corrupt bureaucrats and their businessmen accomplices" in Russia.

In April 2008, because three of Hermitage Capital's subsidiaries had been placed under control of Boily Systems, which is a British Virgin Islands (BVI) company (Note: Thomas Ward, a Canadian with an MBA, and Scott Wilson, a Texan with a minority stake who had been a computer guru and a radio engineer in the Caribbean, co-founded Commonwealth Trust Limited in the mid-1990s at Road Town, on Tortola, British Virgin Islands.) that CTL established in 2007 for G.S.L. Law & Consulting which is a firm in Russia, Hermitage Capital Management sent a letter to Commonwealth Trust Limited (CTL) claiming that thieves had taken control of Hermitage's three subsidiaries. One of the companies, Diron Trade LLP, a stolen Magnitsky company with a Great Britain postal box, assisted in more than $5.8 billion in money laundering transfers between Swedbank's baltic subsidiaries and Danske Bank during 6 months in 2010 and 2011 according to SVT.

As The New York Times reported in 2008, over the next two years, several of his associates and lawyers, as well as their relatives, were victims of crimes, including severe beatings and robberies during which documents were taken. In June 2007, dozens of police officers raided the Moscow offices of Hermitage and its law firm, confiscating documents and computers. When a member of the firm protested that the search was illegal, he was beaten by officers and hospitalized for two weeks. Hermitage became victim of what is known in Russia as "corporate raiding": seizing companies and other assets with the aid of corrupt law enforcement officials and judges. Three Hermitage holdings companies were seized on what the company's lawyers insist are bogus charges.

On 8 October 2008, Hermitage released a video on YouTube accusing Russian police of fraud.

On 16 November 2009, Sergei Magnitsky, a partner of the legal company Firestone Duncan, who was a representative and legal consultant for William Browder in Moscow, having been accused in tax fraud and imprisoned for 11 months, died in prison. In 2013 it was announced that Magnitsky will go on trial posthumously.

Opalesque.TV released a video on 8 February 2010 in which Browder reveals details of Sergey Magnitsky's ordeal during his eleven months in detention. In 2012, Hermitage filed a complaint with Cyprus anti-corruption agency Mokas regarding $31 million funds illegally moved from Russia through a chain banks in Cyprus. However, in 2015, Cyprus police passed the documents to Russian investigators in the alleged tax-evasion case of Magnitsky and Browder, widely described as a set-up.

In April 2013, an employee of Hermitage Capital, played for Darragh MacIntyre, a reporter for the BBC's Panorama programme, the threatening voice messages which were received by a Hermitage Capital colleague.

In 2013, Hermitage closed its Russian fund, which, in 2005, had over $4 billion in assets under management. In 2013, the fund was evaluated as having less than $60 million in assets. Closing the fund led to a dispute between investors and HSBC which was a manager and trustee of the fund.

In December 2017, Browder and Cherkasov were sentenced in absentia to 9 years and 8 years of imprisonment respectively by a Russian court for tax evasion by Hermitage Capital Management and causing $58 million of damage to the Russian federal budget.

In April 2018, Natalia Veselnitskaya announced that on behalf of the General Prosecutor's Office of the Russian Federation, she was investigating Bill Browder and Hermitage Capital, but denied working for the Kremlin.

In May 2018, Bill Browder praised the Magnitsky amendment to the Proceeds of Crime Act released in the United States calling for "swift and robust action" adding that "top Putin oligarchs should be on that list". Also in May, Browder was briefly detained in Spain when a Russian arrest warrant for extradition placed him on Interpol's Red Notice.

In November 2019, an article published by Der Spiegel detailed a critical account of inconsistencies it claims to have found with Bill Browder's stories.
