= Magnitsky Act =

2012 United States federal law

- Long title: Russia and Moldova Jackson–Vanik Repeal and Sergei Magnitsky Rule of Law Accountability Act of 2012
- Nicknames: Magnitsky Act
- Enacted by: the 112th United States Congress
- Effective: December 14, 2012

Citations
- Public law: Pub. L. 112–208 (text) (PDF)
- Statutes at Large: 126 Stat. 1496

Legislative history
- Introduced in the House as H.R. 6156 by Dave Camp (R-MI) on July 19, 2012; Committee consideration by House Ways and Means; Passed the House on November 16, 2012 (365–43); Passed the Senate on December 6, 2012 (92–4); Signed into law by President Barack Obama on December 14, 2012

The Magnitsky Act, formally the Russia and Moldova Jackson–Vanik Repeal and Sergei Magnitsky Rule of Law Accountability Act of 2012, is a bipartisan U.S. federal law enacted in 2012. It imposes sanctions on Russian officials deemed responsible for the death of Russian accountant Sergei Magnitsky in a Moscow prison in 2009. The act also repealed the Jackson–Vanik amendment, granting permanent normal trade relations status to Russia and Moldova. It was signed into law by President Barack Obama on December 14, 2012.

The Global Magnitsky Human Rights Accountability Act, enacted in 2016 as part of the National Defense Authorization Act for Fiscal Year 2017, extends the original act's framework to sanction foreign officials worldwide for human rights violations or significant corruption, authorizing asset freezes and U.S. entry bans.

== Background ==
In 2009, Russian tax lawyer Sergei Magnitsky uncovered a $230 million tax fraud scheme involving Russian officials. After reporting the corruption, he was arrested, accused of the fraud himself, and detained in Moscow's Butyrka prison. Magnitsky suffered from untreated medical conditions, including gallstones, pancreatitis, and calculous cholecystitis. After nearly a year in custody, he died in November 2009, with reports indicating he was beaten by prison guards. The case drew international attention, highlighting systemic corruption and human rights abuses in Russia.

American businessman Bill Browder, Magnitsky's employer and a prominent investor in Russia, campaigned for justice. Browder lobbied U.S. lawmakers, including Senators Benjamin Cardin and John McCain, to introduce legislation targeting those responsible for Magnitsky's death and related corruption.

== Legislative history ==
The Magnitsky Act originated as the Sergei Magnitsky Rule of Law Accountability Act of 2012 (H.R. 4405), introduced in the United States House Committee on Foreign Affairs. The bill aimed to ban Russian officials linked to Magnitsky's death from entering the U.S. or using its banking system. In June 2012, the Senate, led by Senator Ben Cardin, incorporated the measure into a broader bill (H.R. 6156) to repeal the Jackson–Vanik amendment, a Cold War-era trade restriction.

The Obama administration initially opposed the sanctions, citing diplomatic concerns, but Congress tied the amendment's repeal to the Magnitsky provisions. On November 16, 2012, the House passed H.R. 6156 by a vote of 365–43. The Senate followed on December 6, 2012, with a 92–4 vote. President Obama signed the bill into law on December 14, 2012.

Enacted on December 23, 2016, as part of the National Defense Authorization Act for Fiscal Year 2017, the Global Magnitsky Act expands the original law's scope.

== Provisions ==
The Magnitsky Act authorizes the U.S. government to:

- Impose visa bans and asset freezes on Russian individuals responsible for Magnitsky's death or related human rights abuses.
- Sanction individuals involved in significant corruption tied to the fraud Magnitsky exposed.
- Repeal the Jackson–Vanik amendment, normalizing trade relations with Russia and Moldova.

The Global Magnitsky Act extends the first two penalties to officials of any country. It allows the U.S. to sanction foreign officials for:

- Gross human rights violations, such as torture or extrajudicial killings.
- Significant acts of corruption, including bribery and embezzlement.

== Individuals sanctioned ==
In April 2013, the U.S. Department of the Treasury published a list of 18 individuals sanctioned under the Magnitsky Act, including Russian officials and others implicated in the case of Sergei Magnitsky. Notable names include:

- Artem Kuznetsov, a tax investigator for the Moscow Ministry of Internal Affairs.
- Olga Stepanova, head of Moscow Tax Office No. 28, Federal Tax Service of Russia.
- Dmitriy Komnov, head of Butyrka Detention Center.

The Global Magnitsky Act has since sanctioned individuals from various countries, particularly after President Donald Trump delegated authority in 2017 for financial sanctions to the Treasury Secretary and visa restrictions to the Secretary of State. Executive Order 13818 (issued December 21, 2017) sanctioned, inter alia:

- Yahya Jammeh, former Gambian president, for corruption and human rights abuses.
- Dan Gertler, an Israeli businessman, for corrupt mining deals in the Democratic Republic of the Congo.

Subsequent sanctions have included:

- Abdulaziz al-Hasawi, implicated in the 2018 assassination of journalist Jamal Khashoggi.
- Chen Quanguo and other Chinese officials, sanctioned in 2020, for human rights abuses against Uyghurs in Xinjiang, China.
- Filipos Woldeyohannes, Eritrean military leader, sanctioned in 2021, for war crimes in the Tigray War.

=== Individuals formerly sanctioned ===
- Alexandre de Moraes, a Brazilian Supreme Court justice, sanctioned July 30, 2025, for alleged judicial overreach and restrictions on free speech. The U.S. Department of the Treasury stated that the sanctions addressed actions perceived as undermining democratic processes, including Moraes's rulings to suspend social media accounts and restrict online content to combat disinformation. Bill Browder, the leader of the campaign for the passage of the Magnitsky Act, criticized the sanction against Moraes, calling it a "shameful moment", stating the judge did not fit the criteria for such a measure and further claimed that the situation is the "first clear abuse" of Magnitsky. Browder argued Trump was attempting to address domestic political issues through legislation, while ignoring that the Magnitsky Act was meant to punish human rights abuses. The decision also drew criticism from non-governmental organizations such as Transparency International, which viewed the sanctions as "alarming and unacceptable"; also, Human Rights First, where a senior director alleged the U.S. administration "is incorporating into U.S. foreign policy the notion that any accountability effort affecting any of President Trump’s political allies must be baseless and must be halted". Sanctions imposed on de Moraes were lifted on December 12, 2025.
- Viviane Barci de Moraes, Alexandre de Moraes' wife, and LEX - INSTITUTO DE ESTUDOS JURIDICOS LTDA entity, sanctioned September 22, 2025. Sanctions imposed on Viviane Barci were lifted on December 12, 2025.

== Reactions ==
The Magnitsky Act inspired similar legislation globally:

Canada
The Justice for Victims of Corrupt Foreign Officials Act (2017) targets human rights abusers and corrupt officials, with sanctions imposed on Saudi nationals linked to Jamal Khashoggi's killing.
United Kingdom
In 2020, the UK introduced sanctions under a Magnitsky-style law, targeting 47 individuals for human rights violations.
European Union
The EU Global Human Rights Sanctions Regime, enacted in 2020, mirrors the U.S. model.

A 2017 settlement with Prevezon Holdings, linked to Magnitsky's fraud case, resulted in a $5.8 million fine.

Russia retaliated by enacting the Dima Yakovlev Law, banning U.S. adoptions of Russian children, and issuing a reciprocal list of 18 U.S. officials barred from entering Russia. The Russian government also posthumously convicted Magnitsky in 2013, a move widely criticized as symbolic retribution. Russian lobbying efforts, including through lawyer Natalia Veselnitskaya, sought to undermine the act, notably during a 2016 Trump Tower meeting with Donald Trump Jr.

The act has been praised by some human rights advocates, such as Geoffrey Robertson, who called it a groundbreaking tool to target low-level enablers of human rights abuses. Russian dissidents Vladimir Kara-Murza and Boris Nemtsov described it as “pro-Russian” for promoting accountability. Critics, including Russian official Yevgeny Fedorov, argue it serves U.S. geopolitical interests. Some, like Bill Van Auken, have accused the U.S. of selective enforcement, citing its support for other regimes with human rights violations.

== See also ==
- Dima Yakovlev Law
- International sanctions during the Russo-Ukrainian War
- Countering America's Adversaries Through Sanctions Act
- Hong Kong Human Rights and Democracy Act
- Uyghur Human Rights Policy Act
