= Sergei Magnitsky =

Russian lawyer and tax advisor (1972–2009)

- Сергeй Магнитский
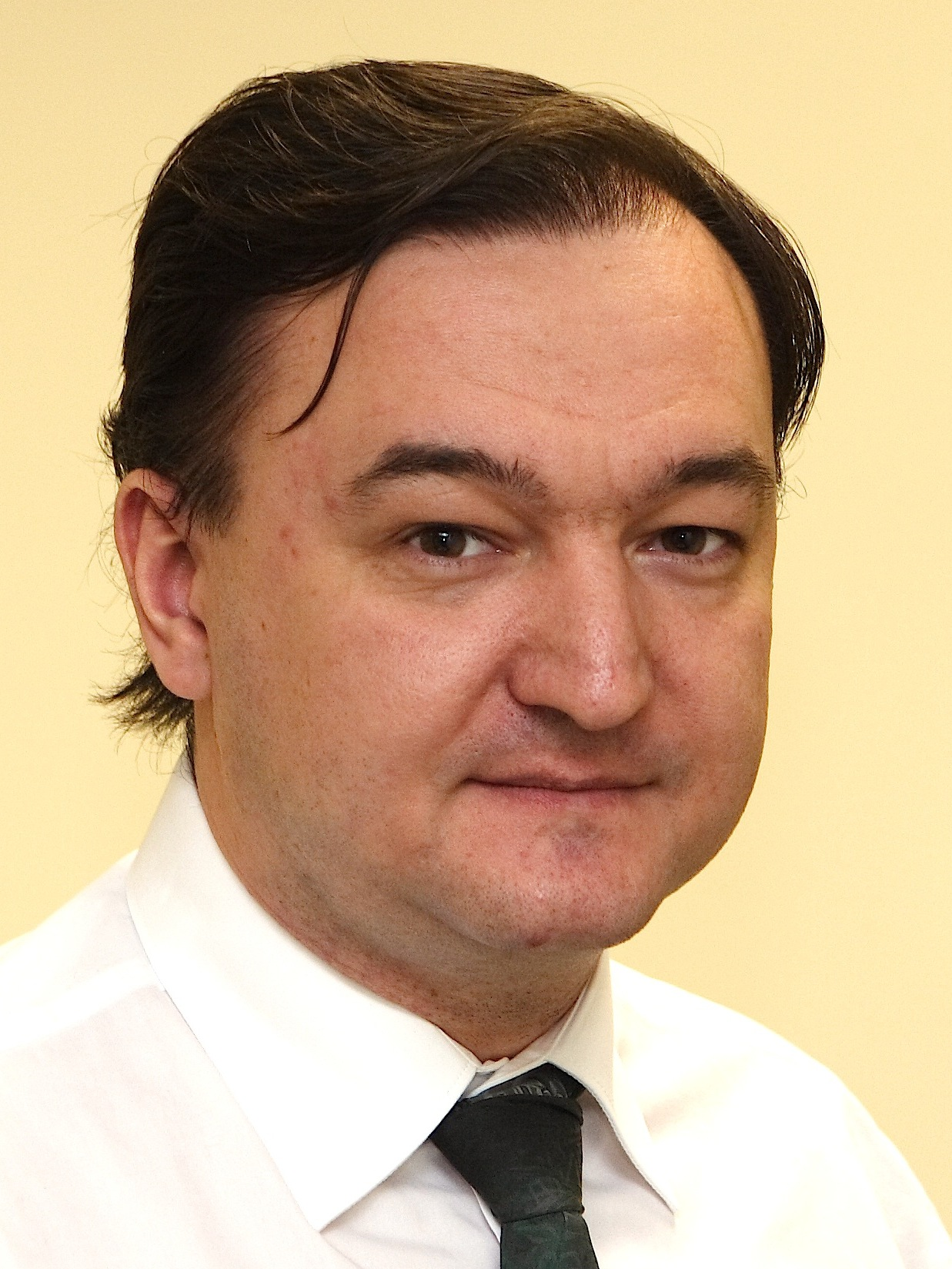
- Magnitsky in 2006
- Born: 8 April 1972; Odessa, Ukrainian SSR, Soviet Union
- Died: 16 November 2009 (aged 37); Matrosskaya Tishina Prison, Moscow, Russia
- Cause of death: Blunt cranial trauma
- Resting place: Preobrazhenskoye Cemetery, Moscow, Russia
- Education: Plekhanov Russian University of Economics
- Occupation: Tax advisor
- Known for: Inspiring Magnitsky legislation
- Spouse: Natalia Zharikova
- Children: 2

Sergei Leonidovich Magnitsky (Russian: Сергeй Леонидович Магнитский, pronounced [sʲɪrˈɡʲej lʲɪɐˈnʲidəvʲɪtɕ mɐɡˈnʲitskʲɪj]; Ukrainian: Сергій Леонідович Магнітський; 8 April 1972 – 16 November 2009) was a Russian tax advisor responsible for exposing corruption and misconduct by Russian government officials while representing client Hermitage Capital Management. His arrest in 2008 and subsequent death after eleven months in police custody generated international attention and triggered both official and unofficial inquiries into allegations of fraud, theft and human rights violations in Russia. His posthumous trial was the first in the Russian Federation.

Magnitsky alleged there had been large-scale theft from the Russian state, sanctioned and carried out by Russian officials. He was arrested and eventually died in prison seven days before the expiration of the one-year term during which he could be legally held without trial. In total, Magnitsky served 358 days in Moscow's Butyrka prison. He developed gall stones, pancreatitis, and a blocked gall bladder, and was denied medical care. A human rights council set up by the Kremlin found that he had been physically assaulted shortly before his death. His case became an international cause célèbre.

The United States Congress and President Barack Obama enacted the Magnitsky Act at the end of 2012, barring those Russian officials believed to be involved in Magnitsky's death from entering the United States or using its banking system. In response, Russia condemned the Act and claimed Magnitsky was guilty of crimes. Nearly a dozen other nations, as well as the European Union, have subsequently implemented or considered Magnitsky legislation.

In early January 2013, the Financial Times wrote that "the Magnitsky case is egregious, well documented and encapsulates the darker side of Putinism".

== Background ==
Magnitsky was an auditor at the Moscow law firm Firestone Duncan, working for its owner, Jamison Firestone. He worked with Firestone Duncan client Hermitage Capital Management, an investment advisory firm accused of tax evasion and tax fraud by the Russian Interior Ministry.

Over the years of its operation Hermitage had, on several occasions, supplied to the press information about corporate and governmental misconduct and corruption in state-owned Russian enterprises. Hermitage's company co-founder, American Bill Browder, was expelled from Russia in November 2005 as a purported national threat; Browder arrived in Moscow, was told his visa had been annulled, and was deported the next day. Browder has said that he represented a threat only "to corrupt politicians and bureaucrats" in Russia, and believed that he was removed to leave his company open for exploitation.

Instigated by FSB General Viktor Voronin (Note: Viktor Voronin (Russian: Виктор Воронин) headed the "K" department of the Economic Security Service (SEB) of the FSB (counterintelligence in the credit and financial sphere) from 2006 until June 2016. Voronin nearly lost his job after former "K" department SEB FSB (Russian: Службы экономической безопасности ФСБ) agent Alexy Yurievich Artamonov (Russian: Алексей Юрьевич Артамонов) defected to the United States in 2008. In the jargon of Chekists, personnel in Directorate "K" often are referred to as "kashniki" (Russian: «кашники»). In addition to the "K" department, the structure of the FSB SEB includes the "T" department (counterintelligence in transport), the "P" department (counterintelligence at industrial enterprises), and other tasks of the SEB FSB including the fight against counterfeiters, drug trafficking, illegal sale of explosives and poisonous substances. Employees of the department have a very large number of agents among bankers, swindlers and drug addicts. In addition to FSB IDs, SEB FSB agents use police "crusts" and cover passports in other people's names. After Voronin left his post in 2016, Ivan Ivanovich Tkachev (Russian: Иван Иванович Ткачёв; born 1970) headed the "K" Directorate.) after Alexander Kuvaldin (Russian: Александр Кувалдин), who was an operative of the "K" Directorate of the SEB of the FSB, addressed his findings in a report to Voronin recommending the prosecution of the Sergey Magnitsky of the Hermitage Capital fund, Voronin added his resolution about the report and sent it to the Moscow police department who initiated a criminal case against Magnitsky.

On 4 June 2007, Hermitage's Moscow office was raided by about 20 Ministry of Interior officers. The offices of Firestone Duncan were also raided. The officers had a search warrant alleging that Kamaya, a company administered by Hermitage, had underpaid its taxes. This was highly irregular, as the Russian tax authorities had just confirmed in writing that this company had overpaid its tax. In both cases, the search warrants permitted the seizure of materials related only to Kamaya. But, in both cases the officers illegally seized all the corporate, tax documents and seals for any company that had paid a large amount of Russian taxes, including documents and seals for many of Hermitage's Russian companies. In October 2007, Browder received word that one of the firms maintained in Moscow had a trial against it for an alleged unpaid debt of hundreds of millions of dollars. According to Browder, this was the first time he had heard of this court case and he did not know the lawyers who represented his company in court. Magnitsky was assigned to investigate the case.

== Exposing the scandal ==
In his investigation, auditor Magnitsky came to believe that the police had given the materials taken during the police raids to organized criminals, who used them to take over three of Hermitage's Russian companies and who fraudulently reclaimed $230m (£140m) of the taxes previously paid by Hermitage. He also claimed police had accused Hermitage of tax evasion solely to justify the police raids, so they could take the materials needed to hijack the Hermitage companies and effect the tax refund fraud. Magnitsky's testimony implicated police, the judiciary, tax officials, bankers, and the Russian mafia. In spite of the initial dismissal of his claims, Magnitsky's core allegation that Hermitage had not committed fraud—but had been victimized by it—was eventually validated. A sawmill foreman pleaded guilty in the matter to "fraud by prior collusion", though the foreman would maintain that police were not part of the plan. Before then, however, Magnitsky became the subject of investigation by one of the policemen against whom he had testified as involved in the fraud. According to Browder, Magnitsky was "the 'go-to guy' in Moscow on courts, taxes, fines, anything to do with civil law."

According to Magnitsky's investigation, the documents that had been taken by the Russian police in June 2007 were used to forge a change in ownership of Hermitage. The thieves used the forged contracts to claim Hermitage owed $1 billion (~$1.45 billion in 2024) to shell companies. Unknown to Hermitage, those claims were later authenticated by judges. In every instance, lawyers hired by the thieves to represent Hermitage pleaded guilty on the company's behalf and agreed to the claims, thereby obtaining penalties for debts that did not exist; all while Hermitage officials were unaware of these court proceedings.

The new owner, based in Tatarstan, turned out to be Viktor Markelov, a convicted murderer released two years into his sentence. The company's fake debt was used to make the companies look unprofitable in order to justify a refund of $230 million in tax that the companies had paid when they had been under Hermitage's control. The refund was issued on Christmas Eve 2007 and was the largest tax rebate in Russian history.

Hermitage contacted the Russian government with the findings of its investigation. The money, which was not Hermitage's, belonged to the Russian state. Rather than opening a case against the police and the thieves, the Russian authorities opened a criminal case against Magnitsky.

== Custody and death ==
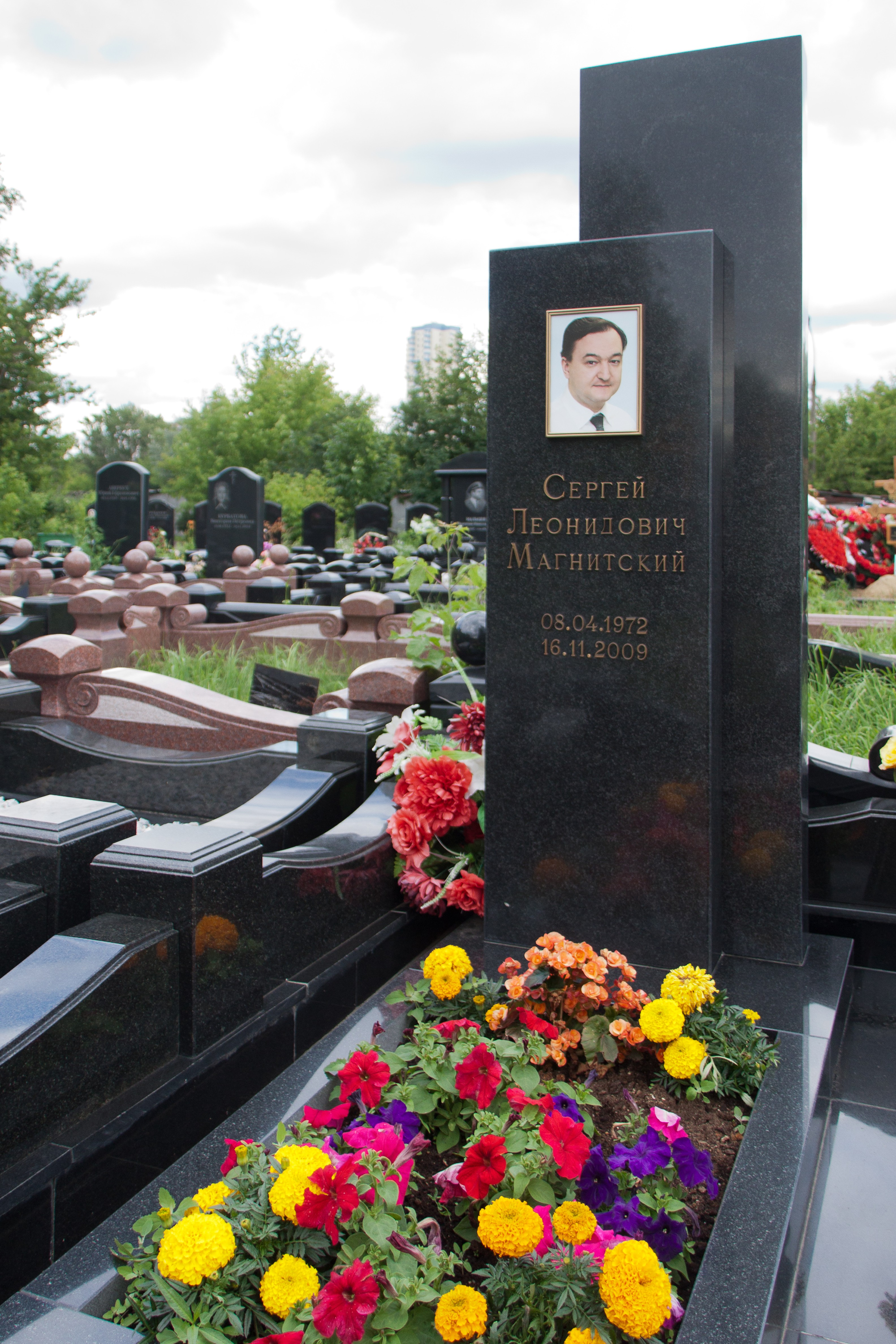
Magnitsky's grave in Preobrazhenskoy Cemetery, Moscow.

Magnitsky was arrested and imprisoned at the Butyrka prison in Moscow in November 2008 after being accused of colluding with Hermitage. Held for 11 months without trial, he was, as reported by The Telegraph, "denied visits from his family" and "forced into increasingly squalid cells." He developed gall stones, pancreatitis and calculous cholecystitis, for which he was given inadequate medical treatment during his incarceration. Surgery was ordered in June, but never performed; detention center chief Ivan P. Prokopenko later said that he "...did not consider Magnitsky sick... Prisoners often try to pass themselves off as sick, in order to get better conditions."

On 16 November 2009, eight days before he would have had to be released if he was not brought to trial, Magnitsky died. Prison officials at first attributed his death to a "rupture to the abdominal membrane" and later to a heart attack. Reporters learned that Magnitsky had complained of worsening stomach pain for five days prior to his death and that by the 15th, he was vomiting every three hours, and had a visibly swollen stomach. On the day of his death, the prison physician, believing Magnitsky had a chronic disease, sent him by ambulance to and later transferred him to Matrosskaya Tishina prison's medical unit, which was equipped to help him. But the surgeon there—who described Magnitsky as "agitated, trying to hide behind a bag and saying people were trying to kill him"—prescribed only a painkiller, and left him to receive a psychiatric evaluation. Magnitsky was found dead in his cell a little over two hours later.

According to Ludmila Alekseeva, leader of the Moscow Helsinki Group, Magnitsky had died from being beaten and tortured by several officers of the Russian Ministry of Interior. The official death certificate stated "closed cerebral cranial injury" as the cause of death (in addition to the other conditions mentioned above), and the post-mortem examination showed numerous bruises and wounds on Magnitsky's legs and hands. Another post-mortem from 2011 summarized the death as being caused by "traumatic application of the blunt hard object (objects)" as confirmed by "abrasions, ecchymomas, blood effusions into the soft tissues".

Journalist Owen Matthews described Magnitsky's suffering in Moscow's Butyrka prison:

According to [Magnitsky's] heartbreaking prison diary, investigators repeatedly tried to persuade him to give testimony against Hermitage and drop the accusations against the police and tax authorities. When Magnitsky refused, he was moved to more and more horrible sections of the prison, and ultimately denied the medical treatment which could have saved his life.

== Aftermath and official investigations ==
An independent investigatory body, the Moscow Public Oversight Commission, indicated in December 2009 that "psychological and physical pressure was exerted upon" Magnitsky. One of the Commissioners said that while she had first believed his death was due to medical negligence, she had developed "the frightening feeling that it was not negligence but that it was, to some extent, as terrible as it is to say, a premeditated murder."

An official investigation was ordered in November 2009 by Russian president Dmitry Medvedev. Russian authorities had not concluded their own investigation as of December 2009, but 20 senior prison officials had already been fired as a result of the case. In December 2009, in two separate decrees, Medvedev fired Alexander Piskunov, deputy head of the Federal Penitentiary Service, and signed a law forbidding the jailing of individuals who are suspected of tax crimes. Magnitsky's death is also believed to be linked to the firing of Major-General Anatoli Mikhalkin, formerly the head of the Moscow division of the tax crimes department of the Interior Ministry. Mikhalkin was among those accused by Magnitsky of taking part in fraud.

Opalesque TV released a video on 8 February 2010, in which Hermitage Capital Management founder Bill Browder revealed details of Sergei Magnitsky's ordeal during his 11 months in detention. On 25 June 2010 radio-station Echo of Moscow announced that Russian Ministry of Internal Affairs Department for Own Security started investigations against Lieutenant Colonel Artyom Kuznetsov, who has been accused of improper imprisonment of Magnitsky. The investigation was in response to an appeal by the Hermitage Capital Management and United States Secretary of State Hillary Clinton. In February 2011, the investigation, which had not yet identified any suspects, was extended to May.

In November 2010, Magnitsky was given a posthumous award from Transparency International for integrity. Magnitsky, according to the awards committee, "believed in the rule of law and died for his belief." A film produced to highlight Magnitsky's persecution has been shown to the American Congress and British, Canadian, German, Polish, and European parliaments.

In July 2011, Russia's Investigate Committee initially acknowledged that Magnitsky died because prison authorities restricted medical care for him. Russian authorities also opened criminal cases against the two doctors who treated him; Dr. Dmitri Kratov, the chief medical officer at Butyrskaya Prison, and Dr. Larisa Litvinova, who managed Magnitsky's treatment towards the end. Dr. Kratov was demoted soon after Magnitsky's death and was charged with involuntary manslaughter from negligence and was facing five years in prison. Dr. Litvinova was facing up to three years in prison if convicted of causing death through professional negligence. An independent prison watchdog commission reported that the prison doctors were pressured by investigators to deny treatment, and Dr. Litvinova disclosed to the Public Oversight Commission that she was trying to get approval for Magnitsky's treatment. However, investigators looking into the death of Magnitsky cleared Oleg F. Silchenko, who oversaw the investigation of Magnitsky, of any wrongdoing. Charges of professional negligence against Dr. Litvinova were dropped due to statute of limitations issues. On 23 December 2012, as the trial neared its end, the prosecutor conducting the trial against Dr. Kratov suddenly reversed course and sought acquittal, citing no direct connection between Kratov's actions and Magnitsky's death. On 28 December 2012, a Tverskoy court found Kratov not guilty of negligence causing Magnitsky's death, thus complying with the prosecution's request.

In 2012 Pavel Karpov, former Russian Interior Ministry officer accused by Magnitsky and Browder of being the main beneficiary of the tax fraud, filed a libel suit in London. Karpov lost the case and was ordered to pay over £800,000 to Hermitage Capital Management. In 2016 Karpov was additionally sentenced to three months in prison for "contempt of court" for non-payment of costs of the libel action. As of September 2016, over £660,000 of that amount remained unpaid.

In February 2012, the Russian police announced their intention to resubmit charges of tax evasion against Magnitsky for a second trial. As pointed out in the press, this was the first posthumous trial in Russia. Browder, who lives in London, was a co-defendant tried in absentia. On 11 July 2013, a court in Moscow found Magnitsky guilty of tax evasion in the posthumous trial. The court also found Browder, Magnitsky's onetime client and a US-born British investor, guilty of evading some $17 million in taxes.

In 2012, the Organized Crime and Corruption Reporting Project, a Sarajevo-based network of investigative centers, successfully traced some of the missing Russian funds to a company owned by Denis Katsyv, the son of Pyotr Katsyv. The money had been invested in a real estate firm that was buying Wall Street apartments in New York City. The U.S. Department of Justice filed a seizure order to recover the apartments in September 2013.

In 2013, the International Consortium of Investigative Journalists (ICIJ), a Washington, D.C.–based nonprofit news organization, obtained records of companies and trusts created by two offshore companies. These included information on at least 23 companies linked to an alleged $230 million tax fraud in Russia, a case that was being investigated by Sergei Magnitsky. The ICIJ investigation also revealed that the husband of one of the Russian tax officials deposited millions in a Swiss bank account set up by one of the offshore companies.

In 2016 a large criminal investigation was completed in Russia that implicated public officers from tax, security, and customs agencies in large-scale VAT carousel fraud schemes, very similar to the one that was used in the fraud against Hermitage Capital, and with the same high-ranking officers providing krysha (Russian: Крыша, "protection") in both cases. A few low-ranking officers were convicted in the case, but no mid- or high-ranking officers were even indicted, despite total losses to the budget exceeding 20 billion rubles. Since worsening of relations with the European Union after 2014, the version officially promoted in Russia is that Bill Browder's Hermitage Capital was responsible for tax fraud and that Magnitsky died as a result of his conspiracy involving Alexey Navalny, which was highlighted in a 2016 investigative film by Andrei Nekrasov. Both Magnitsky's wife and mother, whose manipulated citations were used in the film, wrote a protest letter criticizing the film for bias and manipulations.

On 21 March 2017, the Magnitsky family's lawyer, Nikolai Gorokhov fell, or was thrown, from the 4th floor of his apartment building in Moscow. Seriously injured, he was taken to hospital by helicopter.

== International reactions ==
In late 2010, international attention to the matter intensified, with the European Parliament calling for 60 officials believed to be connected to Magnitsky's death to be banned from entering the European Union, and the Parliament of Canada resolving to deny visas to and freeze the Canadian assets of allegedly involved officials. The EU Parliament also urged members to freeze assets of officials, while similar measures were under consideration in the United States. In October 2010, US Senator John McCain co-sponsored the Justice for Sergei Magnitsky Act, which would forbid entry to the US to 60 individuals named in court documents related to the Magnitsky case. McCain said the law would help to "identify those responsible for the death of this Russian patriot, to make their names famous for the whole world to know, and then to hold them accountable for their crimes." The law is considered analogous to the Foreign Corrupt Practices Act of 1977 in the precedent it hopes to create. In July 2011, the US stated that dozens of Russian officials were barred from entering the United States due to their involvement in the death of Magnitsky.

The Russian Foreign Ministry described the Canadian resolution as "an attempt to pressure the investigators and interfere in the internal affairs of another state", while in a November statement the head of the lower house's international committee Konstantin Kosachyov criticized the European Parliament's conclusions, indicating that sanctions violated the "presumption of innocence" principle and should await the resolution of the Russian court. Bloomberg reported in December that, according to an Interfax story, "identical measures" would be taken by Russia if a European Union ban was put into place. In mid-December, the European Parliament passed the resolution allowing the officials to be banned by member states and their assets to be seized.

In January 2011, the United Nations Special Rapporteur on Torture, Juan E. Méndez, opened an investigation into Magnitsky's treatment and death.

In November 2011 a permanent exhibition with the title "Sergei Magnitsky – witness for justice and democracy in Russia" was opened in the Checkpoint Charlie Museum in Berlin.

In December 2012, the United States passed Magnitsky Act, a law called "Russia and Moldova Jackson–Vanik Repeal and Sergei Magnitsky Rule of Law Accountability Act of 2012" which, among other things, authorized the president to sanction people responsible for violations of human rights in Russia.

Similar acts are being considered in the UK parliament and Irish Dáil.

In December 2012, the Russian parliament passed a Dima Yakovlev Law which was widely regarded by media outlets, including Russian media, as retaliation for the Magnitsky bill. Russia's bill signed into law by Putin on 28 December 2012, banned, among other things, Americans from adopting Russian children.

In the 2013 meetings of the World Economic Forum, the issue surfaced at the highest level, with Reuters reporting that before Medvedev gave his opening speech, some 78 percent of respondents voting in an audience packed with hundreds of Western executives and politicians agreed that Russia's biggest problem was weak government and corporate governance.

On 1 October 2015, Sergei Magnitsky was posthumously awarded 'Honourable Mention' at the Allard Prize for International Integrity ceremony. The Magnitsky family attended the ceremony and responded, "Sergei would have been so proud and humbled by this nomination. He always strived to live his life in the best possible way, with honesty and integrity. Six years after his untimely and heartbreaking death, it is awards such as this that keep Sergei's memory alive. Being nominated for the Allard Prize gives his whole family a huge sense of pride and once again asserts that his life was not sacrificed in vain. Our whole family is immensely grateful for the attention this award will give to the global Magnitsky justice campaign which emerged from our tragedy."

== Personal life ==
Magnitsky was born in Odessa, Ukrainian SSR in 1972 and emigrated to Southern Russia with his family at age 9. A studious child, he was recognized for his academic abilities at a young age, winning the Republican Physics and Mathematics Olympiad at age 15. At 18, he moved to Moscow and attended Plekhanov Russian University of Economics. He later married Natalya Zharikova, a lawyer, whom he met in high school. Together they had two sons.

He is buried in Preobrazhenskoye Cemetery in Moscow.

== Legacy ==
In 2022, the BBC premiered Magnitsky the Musical.

== See also ==
- Michael Calvey
- Jamison Firestone
- Natalia Veselnitskaya
