= Cora Slocomb di Brazza =

Italian peace activist (1862–1944)

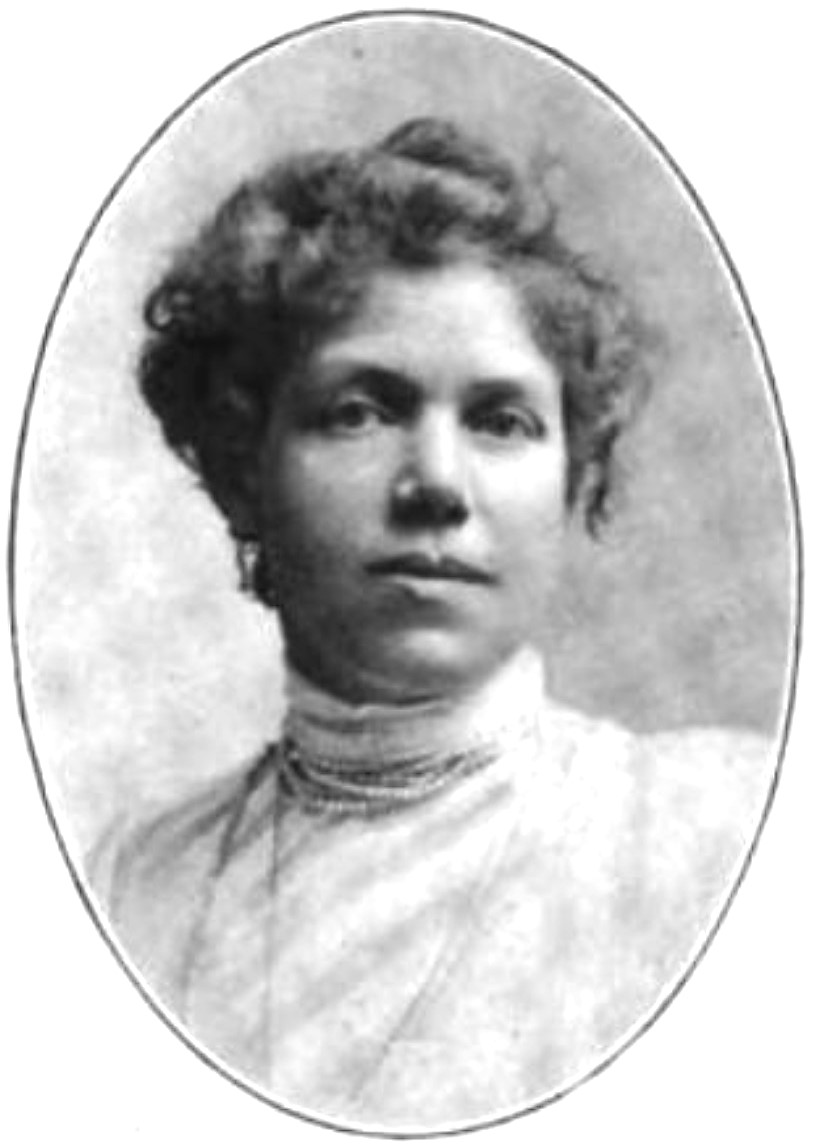
- Slocomb di Brazza in Rome, 1904
- Born: Cora Ann Slocomb; January 7, 1862; New Orleans, Louisiana, US
- Died: August 24, 1944 (aged 82); Rome, Italy
- Other names: Cora A. Slocomb de Brazza; Cora Slocomb di Brazza Savorgnan; Cora Slocomb Savorgnan di Brazza; Countess di Brazza
- Citizenship: United States (until 1887); Kingdom of Italy (from 1887)
- Occupations: Educator; activist; businesswoman; philanthropist
- Years active: 1887–1906
- Children: 1
- Parents: Cuthbert H. Slocomb (father); Abby Day Slocomb (mother)
- Relatives: Idanna Pucci (great-granddaughter)

Signature
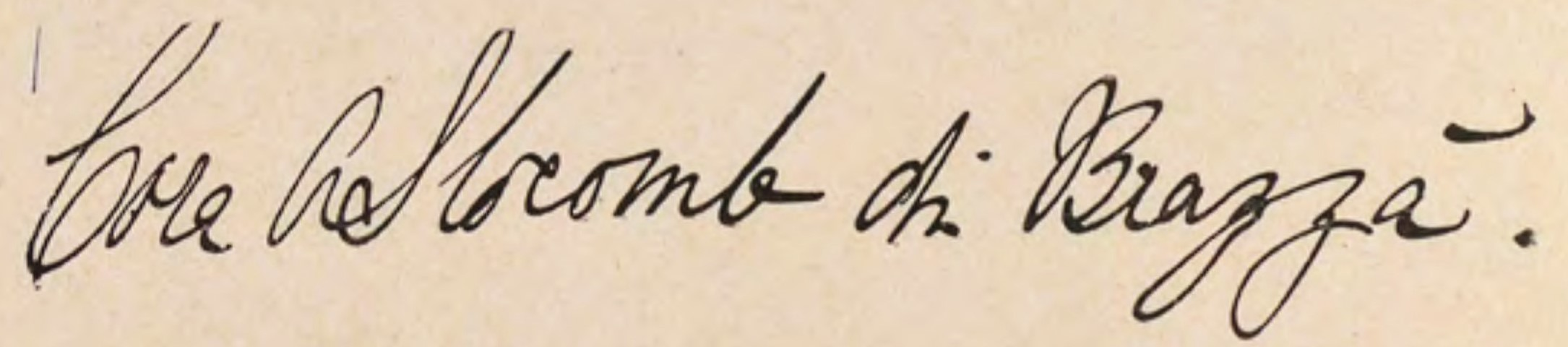

Cora Slocomb di Brazza (January 7, 1862 – August 24, 1944) was an American heiress and Italian activist, businesswoman, and philanthropist. Born into a wealthy family in New Orleans, she relocated to Connecticut after her father's death and was raised in Quaker traditions. Privately tutored, she studied in France, Germany and the Isle of Wight, taking painting lessons with Frank Duveneck. In 1887, she went to Italy and married Detalmo Savorgnan di Brazza, brother of explorer Pierre Savorgnan de Brazza. They settled in his family estate at the Castello di Brazzà in Moruzzo in the Province of Udine, wintering in Rome. She created a lace-making school and eventually opened seven Brazza Lace Cooperative Schools. Besides promoting basic education, the schools taught bobbin lace-making and marketed the wares to help women rise above poverty. Speaking four languages, Slocomb di Brazza printed various language pamphlets to attract interest from abroad in their products. She displayed the goods of the Lace Cooperative Schools at trade shows and world fairs. She also was successful in a drive to reduce US import duties on handcrafted items in 1897, arguing that the tariffs would drive up immigration.

Involved in the peace movement from 1889, Slocomb di Brazza created the peace flag and was the founder of the International Council of Women's Committee on Social Peace and International Arbitration in 1897. The committee worked to create agreements for nations to solve conflicts diplomatically and avoid war. Aligned with her peace work, she undertook numerous humanitarian drives to assist immigrant communities, reduce strife caused by cultural differences, and improve Italian–American relations. Slocomb di Brazza campaigned against the death penalty, fighting for a pardon and then assisting accused murderer, Maria Barbella, in gaining a second trial, at which she was acquitted. She attended the 1903 and 1904 Congresses of the International Council of Women, representing the Consiglio Nazionale delle Donne Italiane (CNDI, National Council of Italian Women). With activists from CNDI, she founded the Società Cooperativa delle Industrie Femminili Italiane (IFI, Italian Women's Industries Cooperative Society) in 1903 to remove middlemen who exploited craftswomen. In 1906, Slocomb di Brazza developed a mental illness which kept her isolated and confined for the next thirty-seven years. The Brazza Cooperative Lace Schools which she initiated are still operational and the peace flag she designed has been widely used in international ceremonies and celebrations.

== Early life and education ==
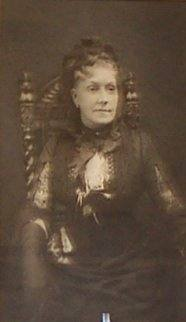
Abigail Day Slocomb, ca. 1890

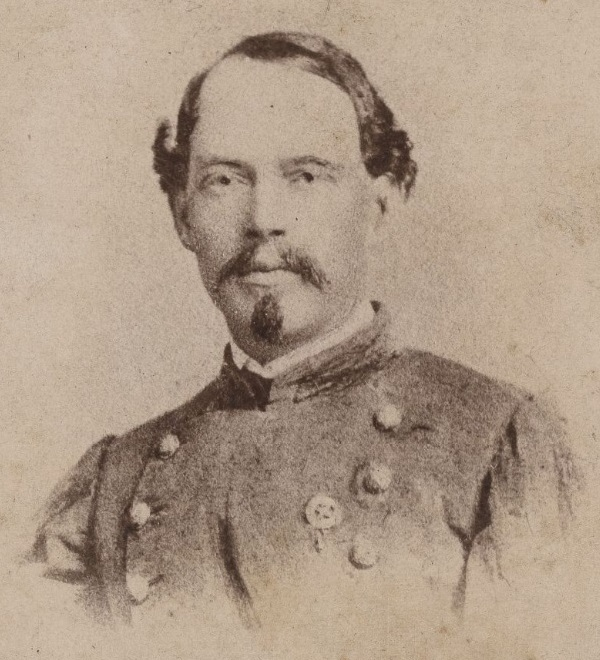
Cuthbert H. Slocomb, 1865

Cora Ann Slocomb was born on January 7, 1862, in New Orleans, Louisiana, to Abigail Hannah Slocomb (née Day) and Cuthbert Harrison Slocomb. At the time of her birth, her father was a Confederate soldier, serving in the Louisiana Washington Artillery during the American Civil War. After his war service, he returned to his partnership in a hardware store which had been founded by his father, successfully accumulating a fortune prior to his death in 1874. Her mother, who worked professionally under the name Abby Day Slocomb, was a Quaker and descendant of Elisha Hinman, a soldier in the American Revolutionary War. She filed several patents, designed the Connecticut State flag, founded the Groton, Connecticut, chapter of the Daughters of the American Revolution, and founded the preservation society and museum for Fort Griswold.

Slocomb was educated in New Orleans until her father's death. The family then relocated to Connecticut, where she studied with private tutors. At thirteen, she went abroad, studying in Germany and France, before completing her education on the Isle of Wight.

In 1884, she became a student of Frank Duveneck, studying painting at the Royal Academy in Munich, Germany. After completing her course, Slocomb traveled to Rome in 1887 and met Detalmo Savorgnan di Brazza, brother of Pierre Savorgnan de Brazza, who explored Africa reaching the Congo River. Soon after their meeting, Slocomb contracted typhoid fever and withdrew to Sorrento for several months to recover. Immediately upon hearing of her recovery, di Brazza went to see her and proposed marriage. The couple were married on October 18, 1887, in New York City. As Slocomb was Protestant and di Brazza Catholic, a civil service took place at 3 East Forty-Fifth Street officiated by Italian consul General Giovanni Raffo, followed by a religious ceremony performed by Father Ducey of St. Leo Catholic Church. Part of her marriage contract required her to become an Italian national.

== Career ==
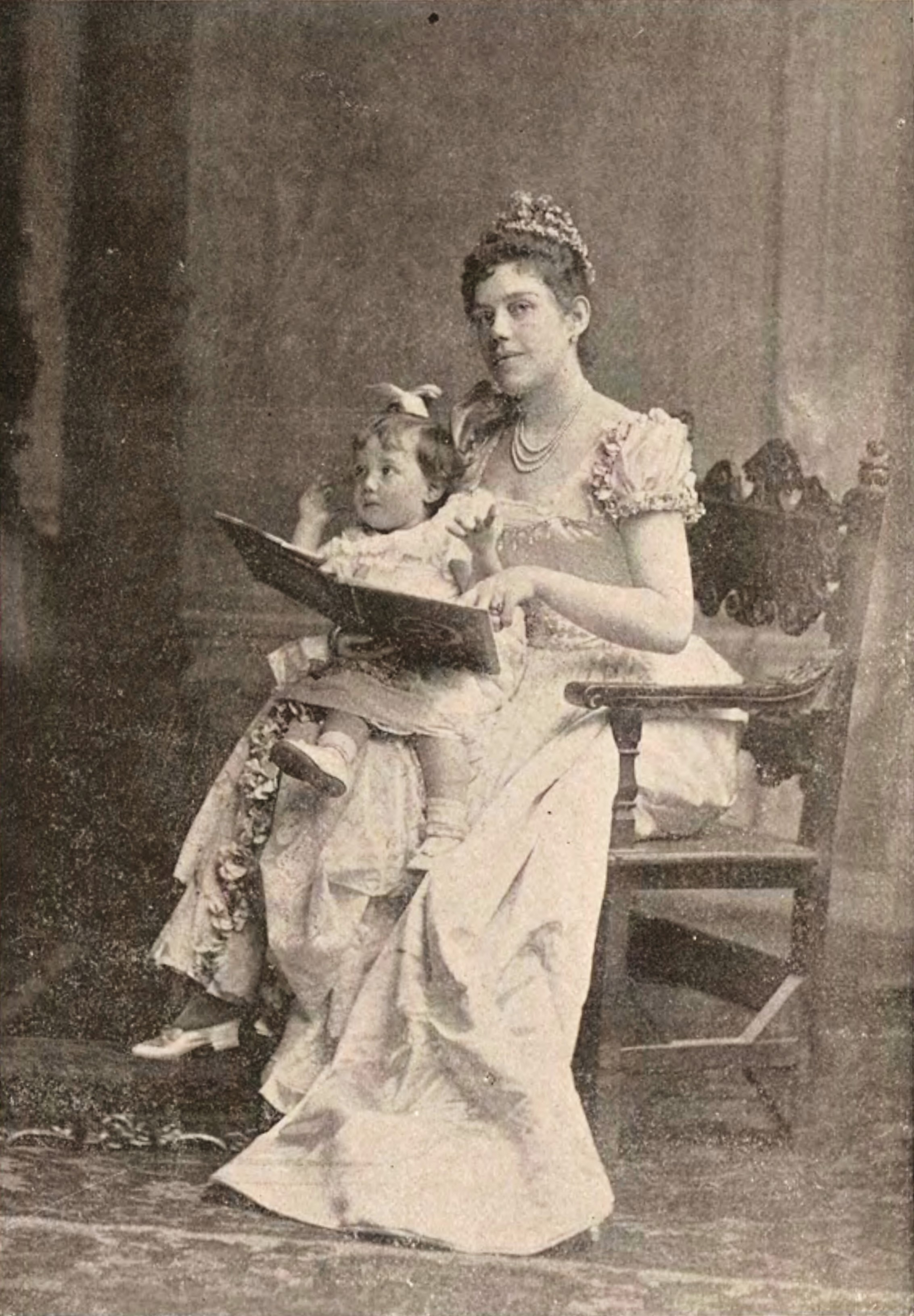
Slocomb di Brazza and her daughter, Idanna, around 1893

After their marriage, the couple lived at the Castello di Brazza in Moruzzo in the Province of Udine and wintered in Rome at the Palazzo Vaccari on Via del Tritore. Their only child, Idanna, was born in 1888. Concerned about the poverty of peasants in Friuli, Slocomb di Brazza created a lace-making cooperative to give the women a means of support during the seasons when they could not work on their farms. She also opened a toy-making workshop in Fagagna, which created dolls and operated until the onset of World War I. Teaching women the skill to make lace, which she had learned in her childhood, she created patterns which incorporated decorative motifs that were traditional in the region. Slocomb di Brazza spoke English, French, German, and Italian and printed pamphlets in each of the languages to attract consumers from abroad. In 1891, she opened the first lace-making school in the hamlet of Santa Margherita del Gruagno. To promote the idea of a school, she taught six girls how to make torchon lace by weaving sixty threads on bobbins and had them demonstrate their new skill at the agricultural show they had organized at the castle for September 8. The lace-makers were the highlight of the show and generated around forty students for the school. Finding no qualified teacher, Slocomb di Brazza taught basic education courses as well as the technical and artistic requirements of lace-making, training the best students to become teachers.

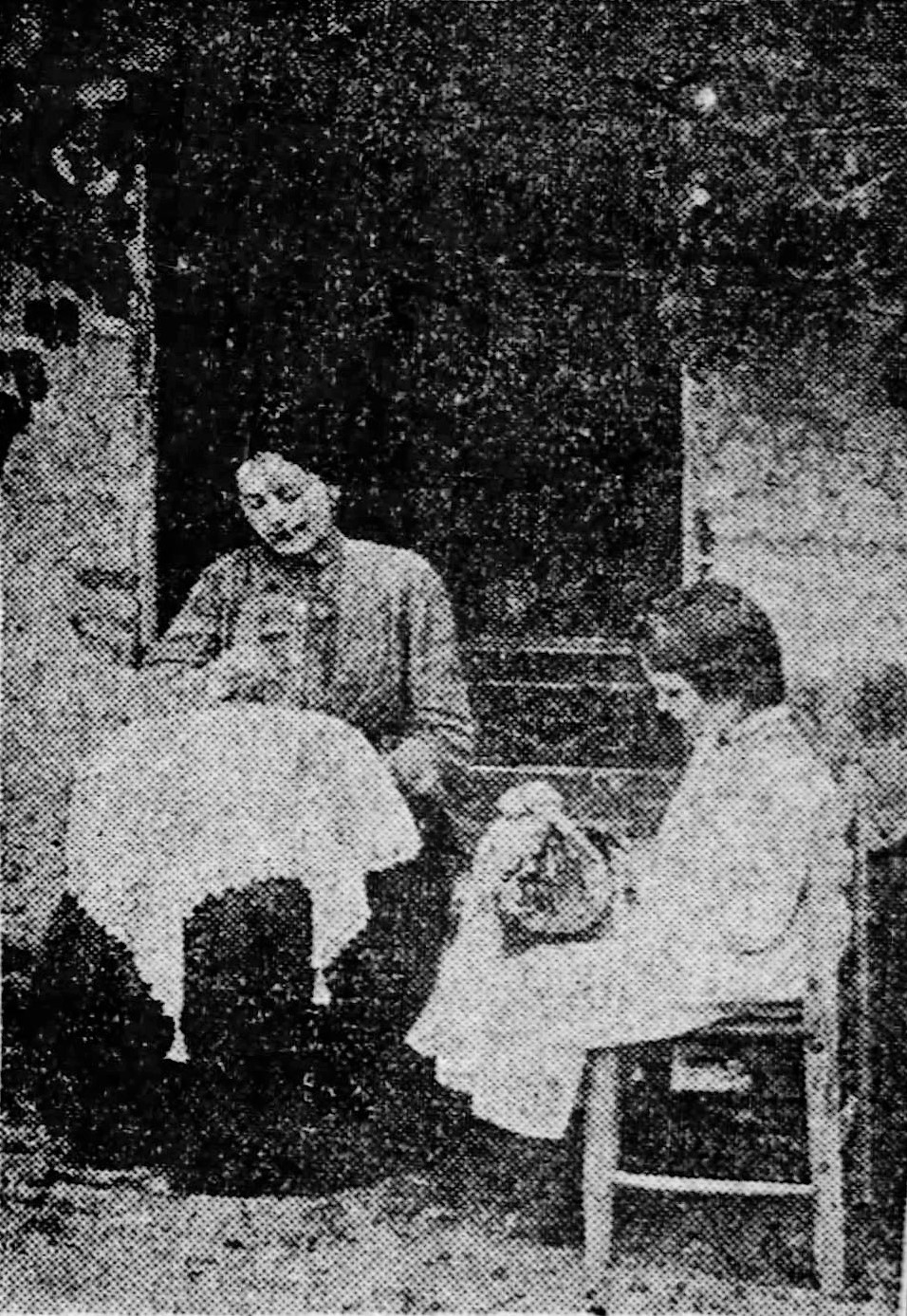
Italian mother and daughter making lace at the Brazza Lace Cooperative Schools, 1906

Following this model, in 1892 a second school was opened by her student Angelica Marcuzzi in Fagagna. Later five other Brazza Lace Cooperative Schools were developed with facilities in Brazzacco, Martignacco, and San Vito di Fagagna. As there was no market for the lace products in Friuli, Slocomb di Brazza used her contacts in Rome to gather antique lace samples. Marrying those with samples provided by her mother and her students, she published a book, A Guide to Old and New Lace in Italy: Exhibited at Chicago in 1893, which accompanied an exhibit of the laces in The Woman's Building at the 1893 Chicago World's Fair. At the Congress of Women held during the exposition, Slocomb di Brazza presented a talk, The Italian Woman in the Country to familiarize the delegates with the work being done to improve women's economic situations in Italy. The exhibit won a gold medal, and after the exhibition, the Philadelphia Museum of Art acquired the laces. Following that success, the schools expanded and submitted works to other fairs, winning two gold medals at the 1900 Exposition Universelle in Paris and recognition at the 1905 Liège International, in Belgium, among others. For three decades after the first Brazza Lace Cooperative School opened in 1891, the main earnings of women in the region came from producing lace, or growing violets. She encouraged her brother-in-law Filippo Savorgnan di Brazza to develop a marketable flower from a wild white violet. Women were able to grow and sell this violet to earn money.

== Activism ==
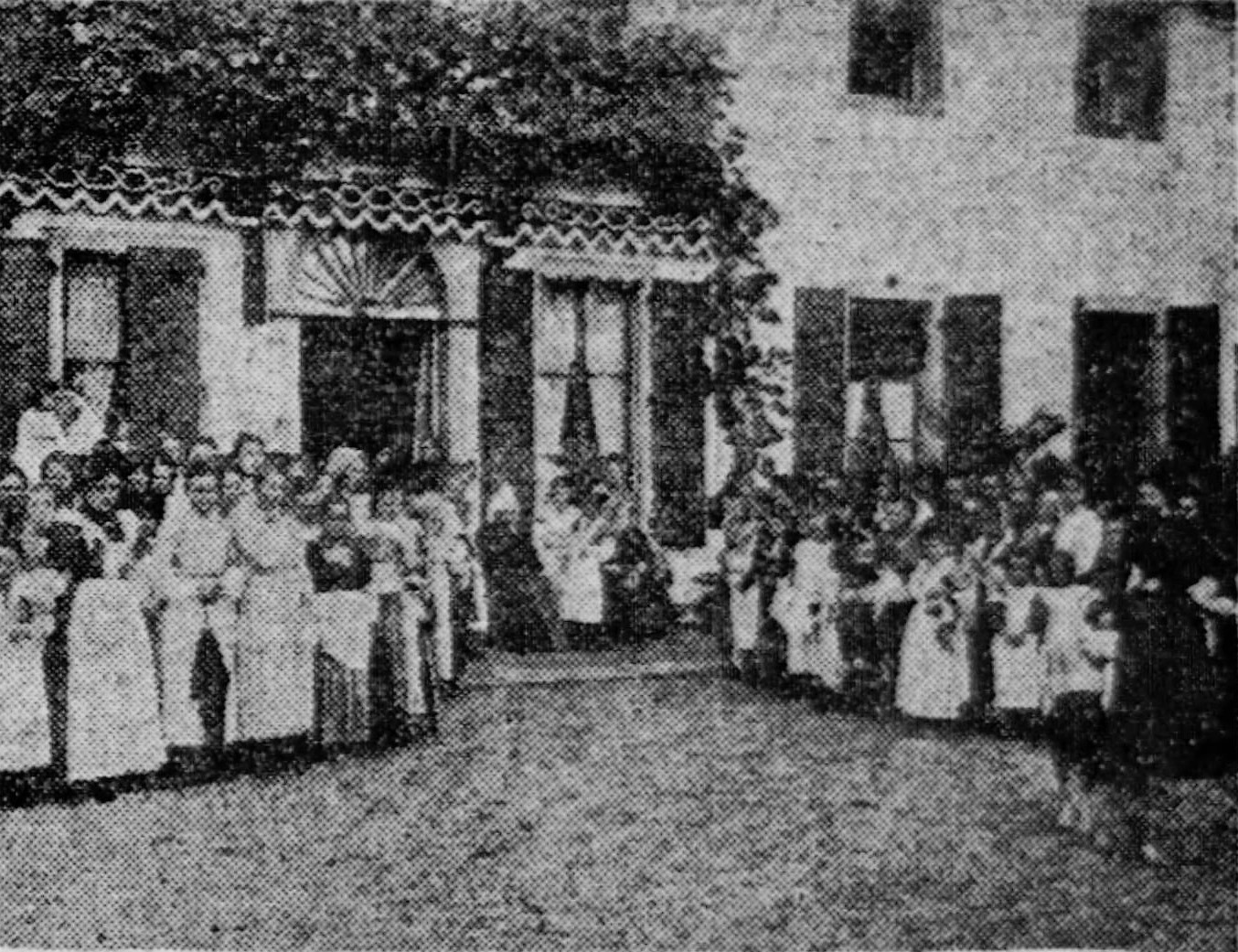
Students at the Brazza Lace Cooperative School, 1906

From 1889, Slocomb di Brazza had been an active member of the Universal Peace Union. She developed seven rules of harmony, as guiding principles aimed at achieving personal and world unity, cooperation, justice, and mindfulness regarding the environment. She shared these principles with her students and worked to develop a peace movement in Italy. As a delegate of the Universal Peace Union, she met with the International Council of Women in October 1897, and formed the Committee on Social Peace and International Arbitration. It was designed to establish arbitration committees throughout the world as a means of developing diplomatic channels for nations to work out their disputes. Slocomb di Brazza became chair of the committee with Hannah G. Solomon as vice chair.

Visiting other women's groups to promote peace, Slocomb di Brazza proposed adopting a peace flag which she had designed after visiting the International Red Cross offices in Geneva earlier that year. The flag featured yellow, purple, and white stripes to represent respectively love, consistency, and youth. In its center was a crest with symbols of peace and the motto Pro Concorda Labor (For Peace I Work). The flag was formally adopted by the International Council of Women in October, and at the meeting of the National Council of Women of the United States held in Nashville, Tennessee, in November it was formally adopted by the organization as a symbol of universal brotherhood, cooperation, and peace. The flag had already been shared with Élie Ducommun, founder of the International Peace Bureau, which adopted the flag in 1899, the year in which it was also endorsed by the Woman's Christian Temperance Union.

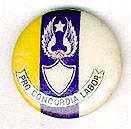
A version of Slocomb di Brazza's peace flag

Concerned about high tariffs on imported lace, in 1897 Slocomb di Brazza published a ten-page booklet, which she sent to members of the United States Congress, arguing that the burden of high import duties was encouraging immigration. Her presentation was successful and resulted in a lowering of the tariff from sixty percent to fifteen percent for handcrafted items. She was acutely aware of immigration issues, as two years before she had sailed to New York City to defend Maria Barbella, a young illiterate immigrant who was one of the first women sentenced to die in the electric chair in the United States. Reportedly, Barbella had been raped by her boyfriend Domenico Cataldo, whom she then killed after he refused to restore her honor by marrying her. An all-male jury had convicted her of murder. After reading about the case in The New York Times, Slocomb di Brazza organized efforts to secure Barbella a pardon and to campaign against the death penalty. The ruling was overturned and Barbella was freed after a second trial in 1896.

Slocomb di Brazza, accompanied her husband for his business affairs in the United States in 1897. As a member of both the American and Italian Red Cross organizations, she spent her time in the United States, assisting humanitarian efforts for soldiers wounded in the Greco-Turkish War. She made presentations throughout the country with Clara Barton, appealing for American activists to assist Greek women in their relief work. She founded the National American Greek Red Cross Association to gather clothing, material, medicine, and money for Greece.

Slocomb di Brazza attended the International Council of Women's 1903 Congress in Dresden, Germany, and the 1904 Congress in Berlin, representing the Consiglio Nazionale delle Donne Italiane (CNDI, National Council of Italian Women), formed in 1903. CNDI members, including Slocomb di Brazza, Etta de Viti de Marco, Antonia Ponti Suardi and Lavinia Boncompagni-Ludovisi Taverna established a standing committee, the Società Cooperativa delle Industrie Femminili Italiane (IFI, Italian Women's Industries Cooperative Society) both to promote Italian arts and crafts abroad, and remove middlemen, who exploited and took advantage of the craftswomen. She became president of the society and her husband Detalmo served as secretary. The society set about creating regional branches organized under various patronesses. By 1906 they had created twenty-four regional branches and established sister organizations in the United States which were designed to provide employment in various needlecrafts for Italian immigrants. That year, Slocomb di Brazza traveled to the United States as a representative of the Italian government to meet with US officials and other people working with immigrants in an attempt to establish protocols for the treatment and processing of immigrants. Believing it would benefit both European and American governments, she suggested an indoctrination program in order to make immigrants aware of the culture and laws and to learn the language, accompanied by a facilitated settlement program so that immigrant labor could live where they were most needed.

== Illness ==
Back in Italy, in 1906 Slocomb di Brazza was returning home from organizing earthquake relief in Calabria when she suffered a mental and physical breakdown in Bologna. By the time her husband reached her, she did not recognize him or her surroundings. She was diagnosed with a form of osteoporosis, known as Paget's disease of bone, which impacted her skull and caused severe and debilitating headaches. She was placed under the care of Cesare Ferrari, a pioneering Italian physician who ran a psychiatric hospital in Imola.

As she was unable to continue their management, the schools were taken over in 1908 by Marcuzzi, who continued their operation to honor Slocomb di Brazza. Her speech was often confused and she had difficulty understanding what was going on around her. Her husband visited her frequently until his death in 1922. She appeared to have improved in 1927 and returned to the Castello di Brazzà, but within six months relapsed and was sent to the Hospital Villa Giuseppina in Rome, where she remained in isolation until her death at age 82 in 1944.

== Death and legacy ==
Slocomb di Brazza died in Rome on August 24, 1944, and was buried in the family vault at the Verano Cemetery. For many years, her history was obscured because of the stigmas surrounding mental illness.

Her defense of Barbella, which has been widely noted, along with her work in the IFI demonstrate that Slocomb di Brazza was aware of the exploitation and vulnerability garment craftswomen faced and that she was willing to use her privilege to assist them. The Cooperative Lace Schools of Brazza continue to train girls between ages seven and fifteen in lace-making.

The peace flag she designed was in wide use until the end of World War I, before losing its significance. In 2013, it was chosen to celebrate Bertha von Suttner, a fellow peace activist and friend of Slocomb di Brazza, for the centennial celebrations of The Hague's Peace Palace. Since then, it has been used in several commemorative ceremonies and celebrations throughout the world. Her great-granddaughter, Idanna Pucci, an anthropologist and documentary film-maker, retold the story of Slocomb di Brazza's involvement in the case of Barbella in her books The Trials of Maria Barbella: The True Story of a 19th Century Crime of Passion (1993) and The Lady of Sing Sing (2020).

== Works ==
- Brazza, Cora A. Slocomb de (1893). A Guide to Old and New Lace in Italy: Exhibited at Chicago in 1893. Chicago, Illinois: W.B. Conkey Company. OCLC 609717966.
- Brazza, Cora A. Slocomb de (1896). A Literary Farce. Boston, Massachusetts: The Arena Publishing Company. OCLC 557626026.
- Brazza, Cora A. Slocomb de (1897). The Human and Urgent Side of the Tariff Question. New York, New York: Andrew H. Kellogg. OCLC 938013132.
- Brazza, Cora A. Slocomb de (1897). Ampharita: An American Idyll (2nd ed.). New York, New York: Peace Bureau. OCLC 256854964.
- Brazza, Cora A. Slocomb de (1906). Relief For Calabria Through Local Co-operative Production: Report And Project For Co-operative Work-rooms And Industrial Schools For The Necessitous Women And Children. Milan, Italy: Segretario di propaganda pel lavoro in Calabria. OCLC 893912874.
