= Abby Day Slocomb =

American historic preservationist (1836–1917)

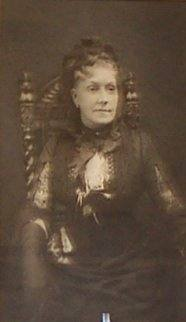
- Slocomb, c. 1890
- Born: Abigail Hannah Day; October 5, 1836; New Orleans, Louisiana
- Died: December 6, 1917 (aged 81); Zürich, Switzerland
- Occupations: Inventor, preservationist, philanthropist
- Spouse: Cuthbert H. Slocomb (m. 1860; died 1873)
- Children: Cora Slocomb di Brazza

Abby Day Slocomb (October 5, 1836 – December 6, 1917) was an American inventor, philanthropist and historic preservationist. Born and raised in New Orleans, Louisiana, she descended from a Connecticut Revolutionary soldier and was a Quaker. After marrying Cuthbert H. Slocomb in 1860, she served as a nurse during the American Civil War. Her husband was a Confederate officer and the cannon used by his unit was named "Lady Slocomb" in her honor. He died in 1873, leaving his share of the lucrative hardware firm, Slocomb, Baldwin & Company, to his wife and sister, Ida A. Richardson. In addition to her earnings from the business, Slocomb filed several patents. She donated windows to the historic Christ Church Cathedral in New Orleans and helped the Ladies Aid Society raise money to save the church.

Slocomb moved to Groton, Connecticut, in 1888. She founded that city's chapter of the Daughters of the American Revolution (DAR) in 1892, and three years later founded the chapter in New Orleans. She was the inaugural regent of the Groton chapter and first state director for the Children of the American Revolution (CAR). She also located the lot on which the Memorial Continental Hall, headquarters of the DAR, was built. Realizing that Connecticut did not have an official flag, she pressed the legislature to adopt one and submitted designs for consideration. After a protracted disagreement over which emblem should be chosen, her design was accepted as the Connecticut State flag in 1897.

Interested in historical preservation, she wrote letters to President Theodore Roosevelt and Secretary of War Elihu Root convincing them to turn over Fort Griswold to the care of the state of Connecticut in 1902. A society was formed to preserve the site and the DAR developed a museum at the fort, making its headquarters in the former caretaker's cottage.

When her daughter became ill in 1906, Slocomb moved to Italy where she remained for the rest of her life. The designs she submitted for the Connecticut state flag are located in the Fort Griswold Museum. The cannon which was named after her is on display in front of the Confederate Memorial Hall in New Orleans. The DAR built its headquarters and national meeting place on the lot she found on 17th Street, between Streets C and D in Washington, D.C. The building was completed in 1910 and served as the organization's convention center until 1929. It was designated as a National Historic Landmark in 1972.

== Early life ==
Abigail Hannah Day was born on October 5, 1836 in New Orleans, Louisiana, to Sarah Eliza (née Armitage) and James Ingersoll Day. The family were Quakers and descendants of Elisha Hinman, a soldier in the American Revolutionary War. Hinman was commissioned as commander of the ship Alfred and later the ship Cabot and successfully captured several British ships during the conflict, before being taken prisoner.

Her father, James Day, originally from New London, Connecticut, turned down a military career in favor of business. At seventeen, he moved to New Orleans and worked at the hardware wholesale firm of Palmer & Whiting. When the original partners retired, Day and Robert Slark took over the concern. He later served as president of the Sun Mutual Insurance Company. Her mother was the sister-in-law of his business partner. The couple had six children after Abby – Helen Amelia, Sallie E., Jane W., James Armitage, Marie Louise, and Robert Slark Day. The family lived in New Orleans until Day retired and then moved to Stonington, Connecticut.

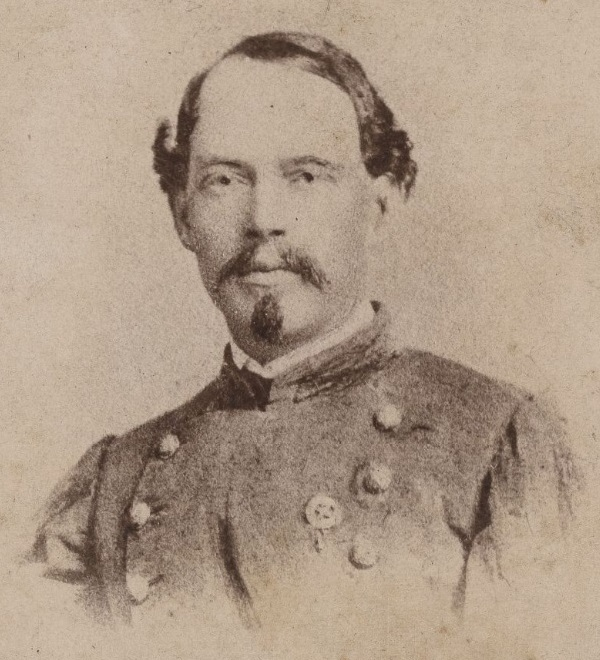
Cuthbert H. Slocomb by Washburn, 1865

On October 18, 1860, in Stonington, Abby married Cuthbert H. Slocomb, the senior partner in the New Orleans hardware firm of Slocomb, Baldwin & Company. The store had been founded by his father, Samuel B. Slocomb, who died in 1833, leaving an estate of over a million dollars to his wife, Cora Ann (née Cox), and three children, Ida, Augusta, and Cuthbert. Cuthbert also was the fire chief of the local volunteer fire department and in 1861 enlisted in the elite, 2nd Company of the Washington Artillery of the Confederate States Army for service during the American Civil War. The couple's only child, Cora Ann was born on January 7, 1862. In the spring of that year, Cuthbert was assigned to the command of the 5th battalion's Company B, and was injured in the Battle of Shiloh.

At the battle, the cannon "Lady Slocomb", named in honor of Cuthbert's wife, fired its first shot. He was later wounded a second time at the Battle of Jonesborough, but after recovering from his wounds returned to command until the surrender of his regiment on May 8, 1865. After his service, he returned to his hardware business.

== Career ==
=== Louisiana (1861–1888) ===
During the war, Slocomb worked as a nurse and after Cuthbert died in 1873, she and her sister-in-law Ida A. Richardson maintained the family interest in the hardware firm. She worked professionally under the name Abby Day Slocomb and filed several patents. The first was for a deodorant made with baking soda and corn starch. She and Jenny Whiting Day were granted patent 279,195 in 1883 and they jointly filed a trademark for a toilet powder in 1885. In 1896, Slocomb was the sole filer for a patent on a table bell she had designed.

When Cuthbert died in 1873, Slocomb donated two memorial windows in his honor to the Christ Church Cathedral, where he had served as a vestryman. (Note: The source says Cuthbert's wife was named Cora, but that was the name of his mother and his daughter.) The church was closed in the summer of 1882 because the rector had died in May. The building was in need of repair and the congregation was in severe financial straits. A committee was formed to investigate the costs of repair versus finding a new location. Unable to make a decision on what to do,

Slocomb, her sister-in-law Ida, and her mother-in-law Cora, organized the members of the Ladies Aid Society to raise money to pay off the debts. By the spring of 1883, they had raised $10,000 toward the $14,500 debts the church owed. Despite their efforts, as the remaining debt could not be paid, the building was sold in 1884, and the church had to rent a meeting space until a new building could be constructed in 1886.

=== Connecticut (1888–1906) ===
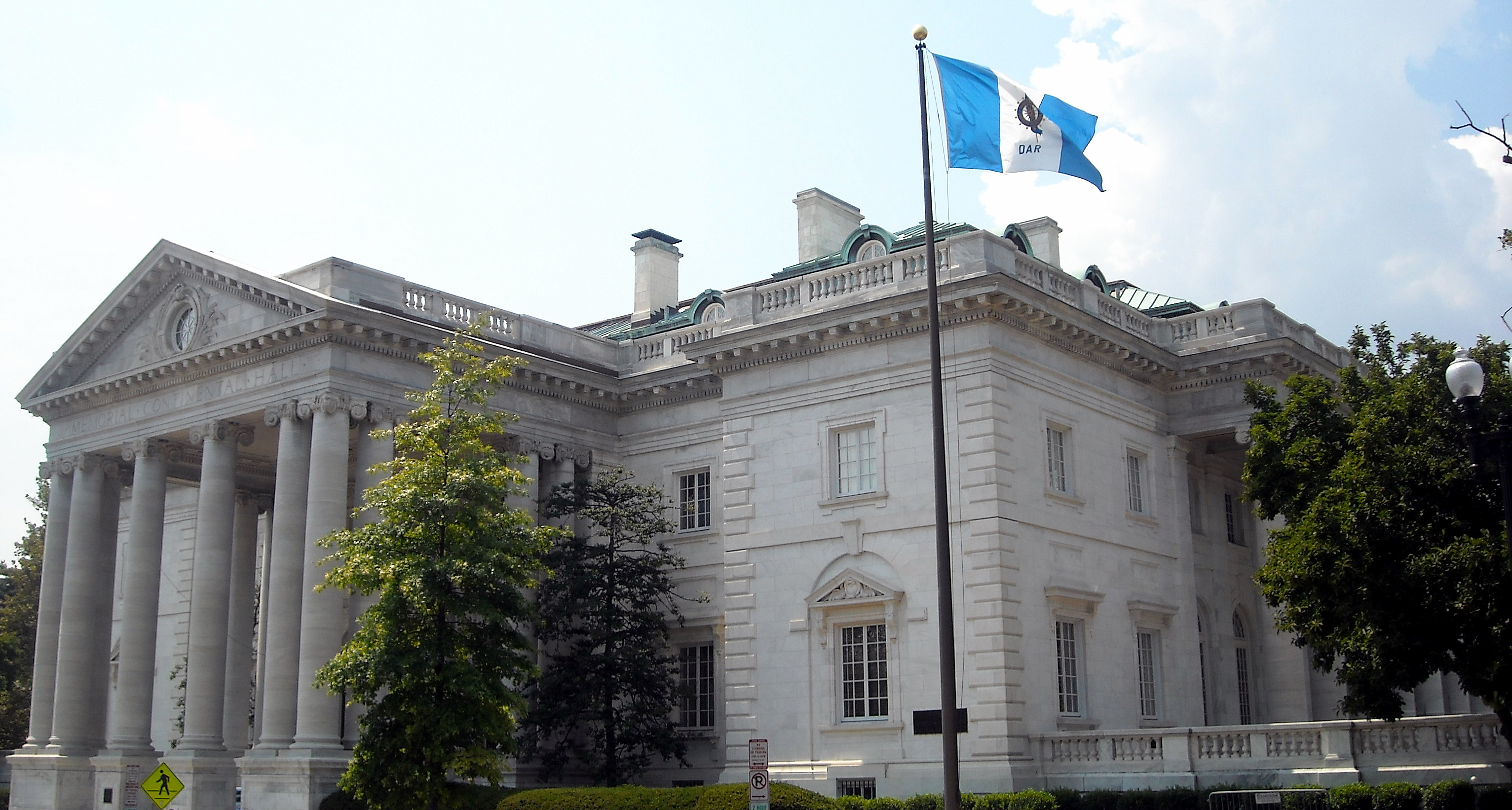
Memorial Continental Hall, Washington, D.C.

A year after her daughter married and moved to Italy in 1887, Slocomb took up residence in Groton, Connecticut. The national chapter of the Daughters of the American Revolution (DAR) was founded in 1890. Two years later, the Anna Warner Bailey chapter was founded in Groton by Slocomb, who was selected by the Connecticut State DAR regent to serve as regent of the Groton chapter.

In 1895, she was contacted by Augusta Geer, a national vice president of the organization, about founding a Louisiana chapter. Slocomb agreed and set about recruiting members and educating them about the DAR. Establishing a charter and funding its organizational activities, she founded the first Louisiana chapter, the "Spirit of '76" in New Orleans on March 2, 1895. That year, the national association, Children of the American Revolution (CAR), was founded with the purpose of educating children about history and the responsibilities of citizenship. Slocomb became the state director for the CAR in 1897. In 1902, she was instrumental in locating a permanent site for the national headquarters of the DAR. Originally the organization was looking at a lot between H and I Streets on Connecticut Avenue, but Slocomb scoured the city for a better location. Her choice was accepted by the committee appointed to select the site. The lot for the Daughters of the American Revolution Hall was located on 17th Street, between Streets C and D, and cost $50,000. It was dedicated in 1905.

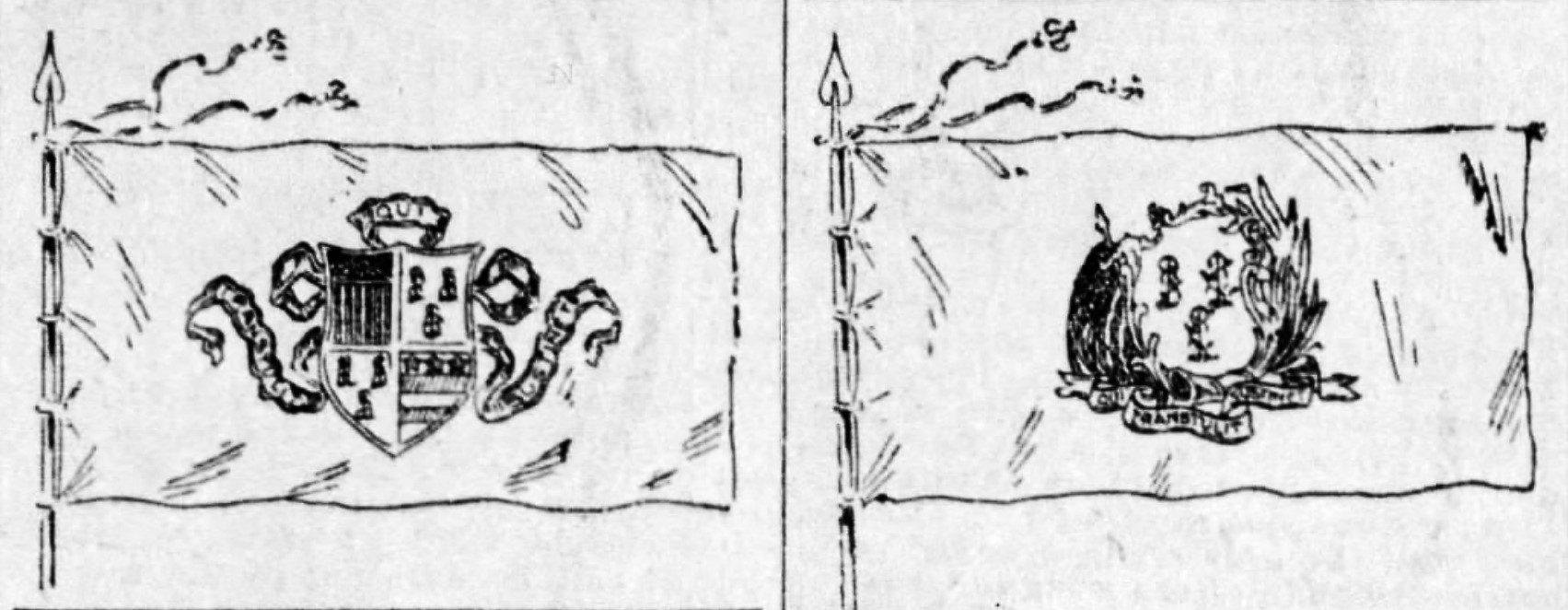
Slocomb's designs for the State Flag of Connecticut

In 1894, Slocomb wrote to the Connecticut General Assembly proposing that a state flag be adopted, when the Groton DAR discovered that there was no official flag. The legislature confirmed the DAR's findings, and a resolution was passed the following year to create a memorial flag. A design competition was opened and Slocomb drafted two designs based upon the Seal of Connecticut from 1639. Other designs were proposed by the Grand Army of the Republic, the Sons of the American Revolution, and the Society of Colonial Wars. Many of the veterans' organizations were in favor of adopting their military flags, or assumed that their unit's flag was an official state flag. The Hartford Courant was in favor of John James Goodwin's draft and published only his designs. After a two-year campaign by the DAR, the design submitted by Slocomb featuring a Rococo shield and three grapevines to represent the colonies of Connecticut, New Haven, and Saybrook was chosen as the Connecticut State flag. It was adopted and flown above the capitol for the first time at a dedication ceremony at which Slocomb and dignitaries were present on August 12, 1897.

Slocomb lived across the street from Fort Griswold and, as the DAR was concerned about protecting historical sites and artifacts, she began pressuring the government about the fort. Writing letters to federal officials, she corresponded with President Theodore Roosevelt and Elihu Root, United States Secretary of War, urging them to allow the State of Connecticut to care for the site. Her efforts were successful in 1902, when the federal government turned over the fort to the state. The following year, the governor appointed a commission to take charge of its preservation. She led the Groton DAR chapter to restore the caretaker's house and establish a museum. The chapter moved into the Monument House at Fort Griswold, making it its headquarters.

=== Italy (1906–1917) ===
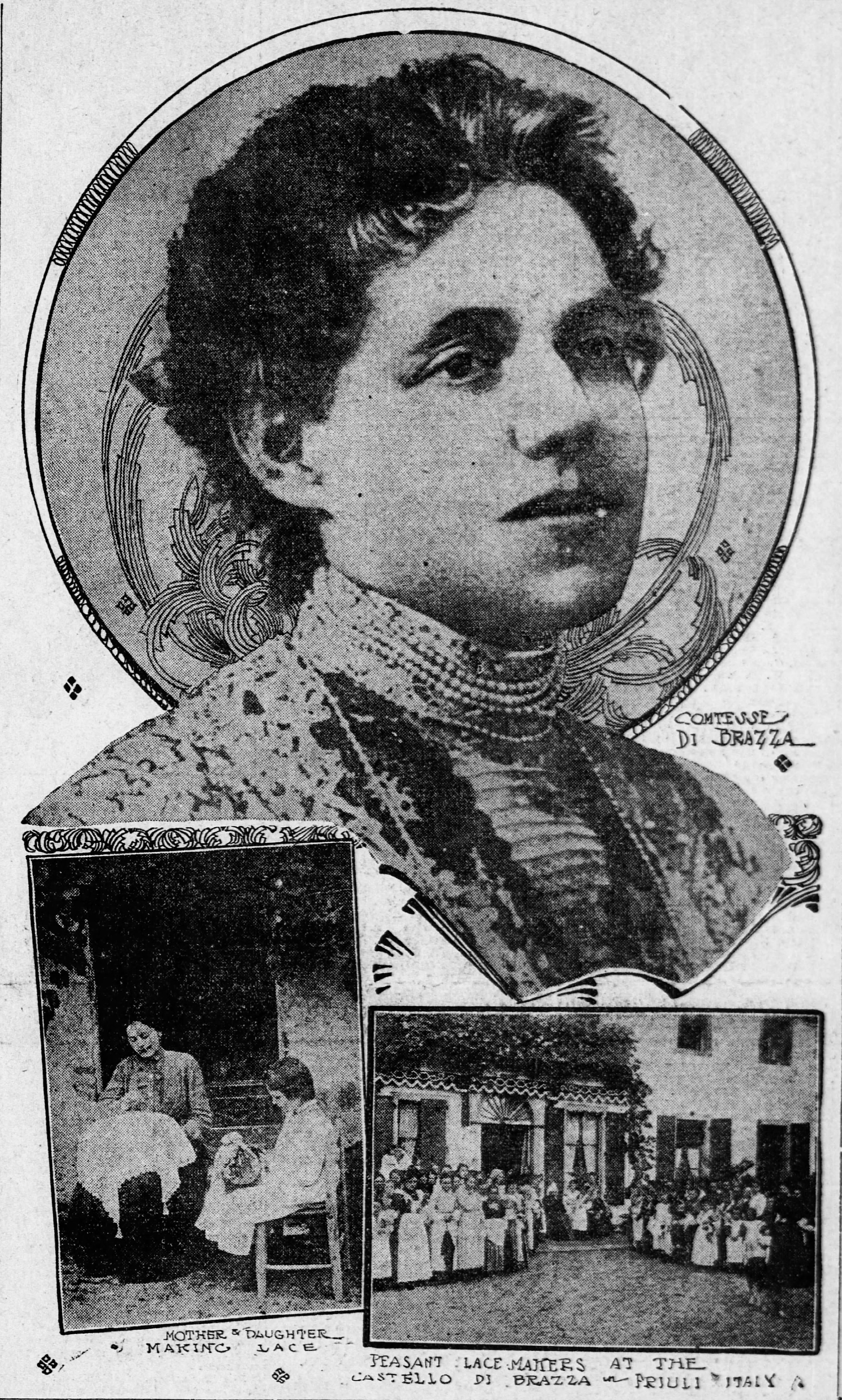
Cora Slocomb di Brazza, craftswomen making lace, and her lace school at the Castello di Brazza in Moruzzo, Italy

After eighteen years of living in Groton, Slocomb moved to Italy to be near her daughter in 1906. Cora had started a lace cooperative in Moruzzo, to assist the poverty-stricken women in Friuli. She taught local women how to make lace, founded six lace-making schools, and helped them market their wares. In 1906, after organizing earthquake relief in Calabria, Cora had a physical and mental collapse, when she was returning home. She was diagnosed with a form of osteoporosis, known as Paget's disease of bone, which impacted her skull and caused severe and debilitating headaches. Although her family visited her, for the rest of her life, Cora was confined to mental hospitals, as she was often confused and unable to comprehend or recognize people and events she encountered. Slocomb lived in Italy during the winter and spent her summers in Switzerland.

== Death and legacy ==
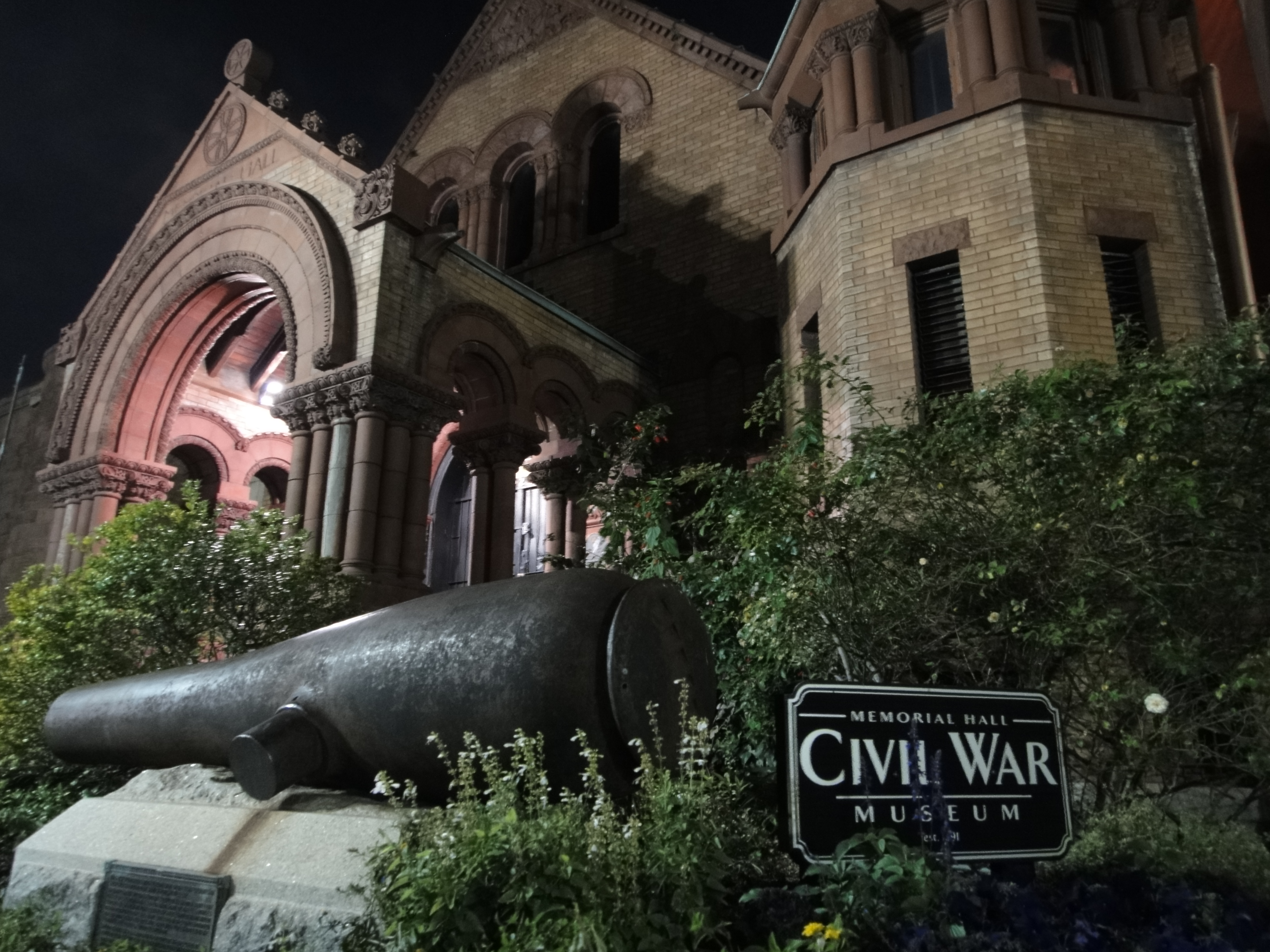
Lady Slocomb Cannon in front of Confederate Memorial Hall Museum

Slocomb died on December 6, 1917, in Zürich. At the time of her death, she was remembered for her charitable work and efforts in historic preservation. Legend maintained that the "Lady Slocomb" fired the "last shot in the last battle of the last American war", at the engagement of Spanish Fort. After the battle, it was buried to prevent its capture. In 1891, the cannon was retrieved by the Blue and Gray Union and taken to Mobile, Alabama, and five years later it was put up for sale. It was purchased and placed at the entry to the Confederate Memorial Hall in New Orleans in 1899. The DAR headquarters building was completed in 1910 and served as the meeting place for the organization until 1929. It was listed as a National Historic Landmark in 1972. Slocomb's designs for the Connecticut state flag are on display at the Fort Griswold Museum. In 2014, a time capsule Slocomb had created in Italy in 1914, hoping that Italian newspaper clippings would add historic perspective to the events of World War I was opened by the Anna Warner Bailey Chapter of the Connecticut DAR at their annual fundraising event.
