= Brazza =

Brazza may refer to:

- Brazza (Lat. Brattia) Italian name of the Croatian island of Brač, placed in the Adriatic sea
- Cora Slocomb di Brazza also Brazzà (1862–1944), American-born Italian activist and businesswoman
- Pierre Savorgnan de Brazza (1852–1905), Italian-born, naturalized French explorer.
- Jacques Savorgnan de Brazza (1859–1888), Italian naturalist
