= Olive branch =

Symbol of peace or victory

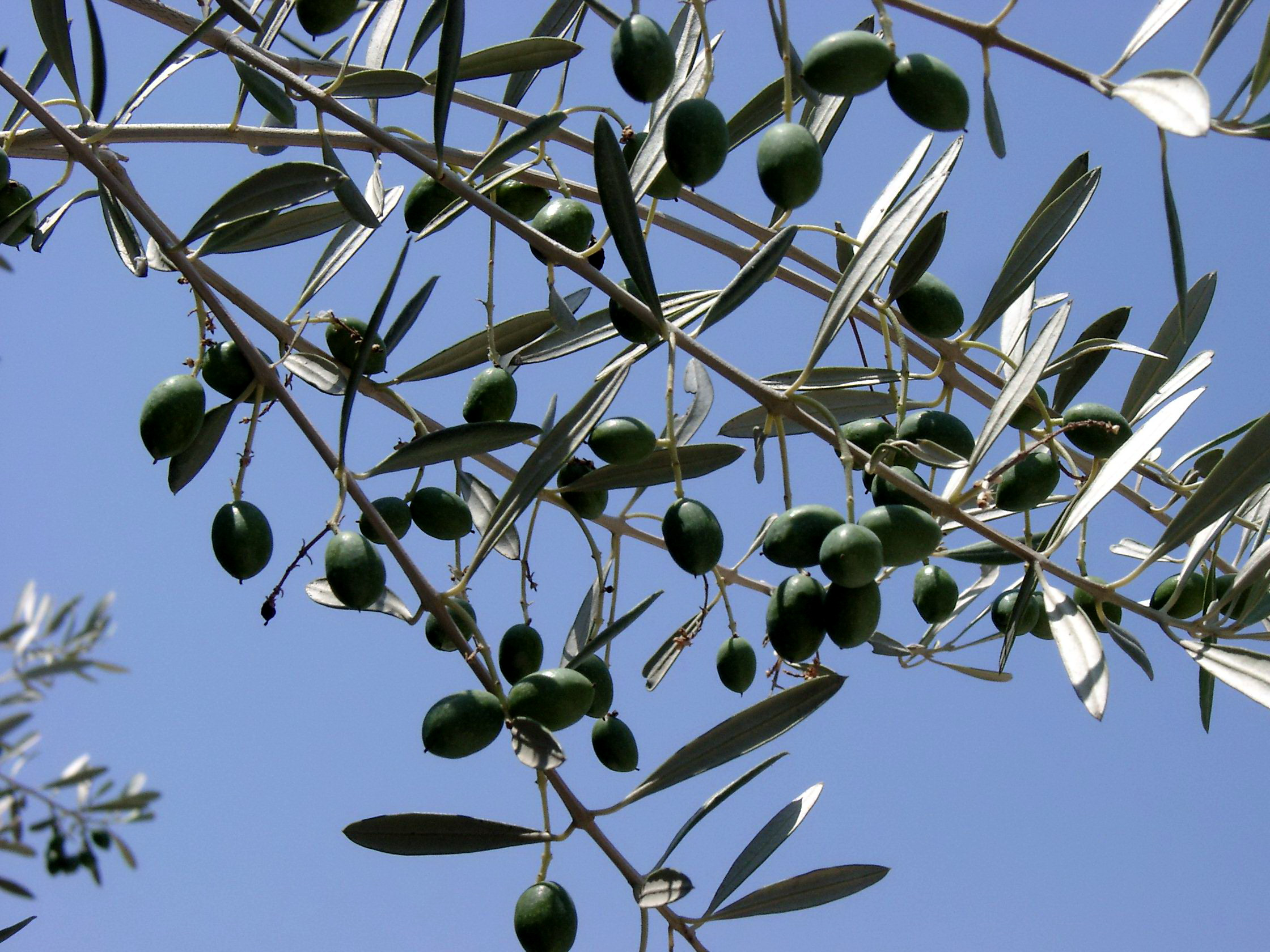
Branches of an olive tree

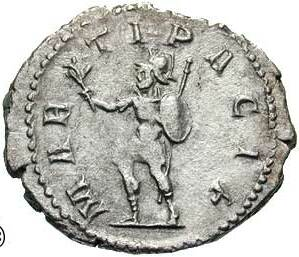
Mars Pacifer bearing an olive branch, on the reverse of a coin struck under the lights and reverse (Aemilianus)

The olive branch, a ramus of Olea europaea, is a symbol of peace. It is generally associated with the customs of ancient Greece and ancient Rome, and is connected with supplication to divine beings and persons in power. Likewise, it is found in most cultures of the Mediterranean Basin and thence expanded to become an almost universally recognized peace symbol in the modern world.

== In the Greco-Roman world ==
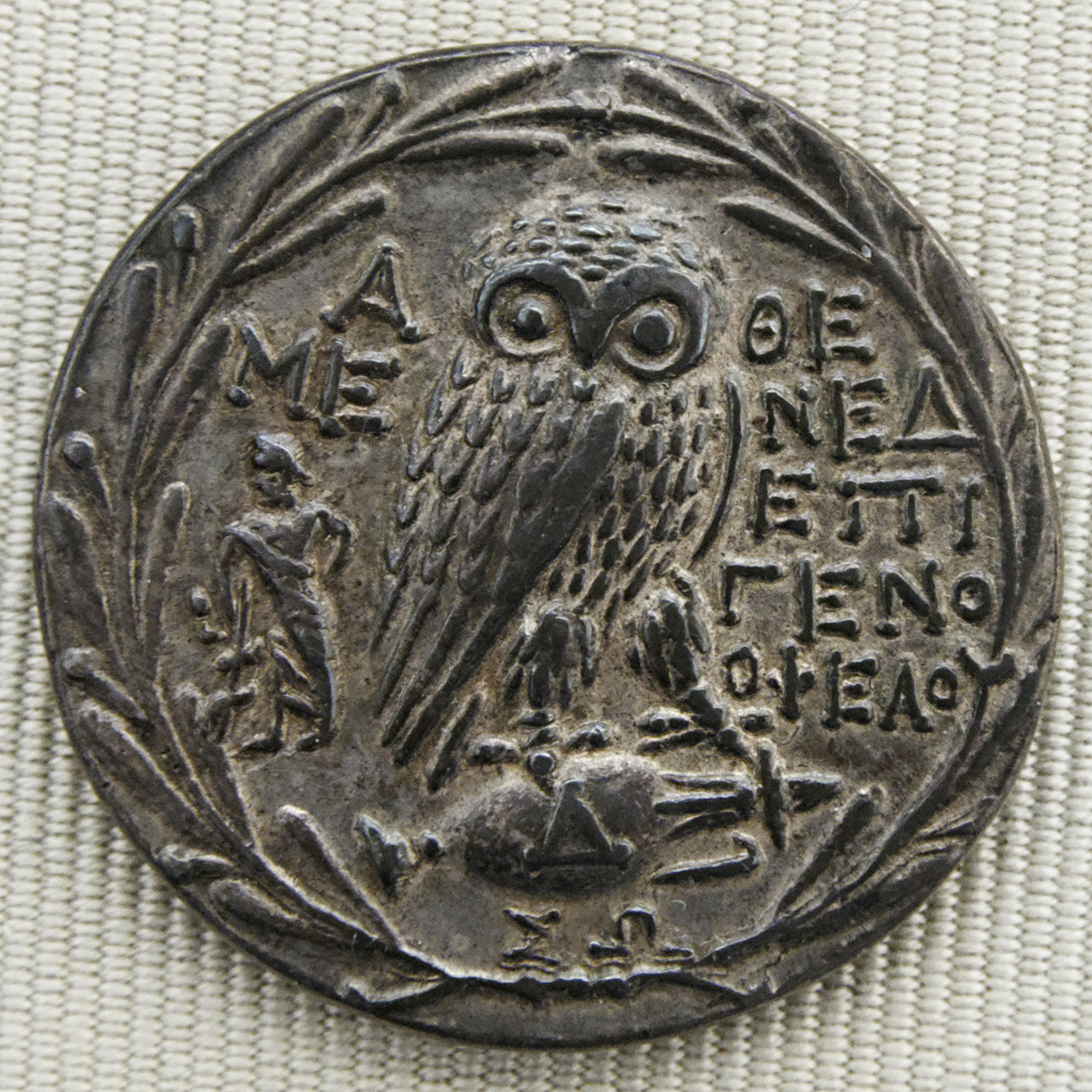
Owl standing on amphora, all surrounded by a wreath of olive leaves. Greek silver tetradrachm from Athens, c. 200–150 BC

In Greek tradition, a hiketeria (ἱκετηρία) was an olive branch held by supplicants to show their status as such when approaching persons of power or in temples when supplicating the gods.

In Greek mythology, Athena competed with Poseidon for possession of Athens. Poseidon claimed possession by thrusting his trident into the Acropolis, where a well of sea-water gushed out. Athena took possession by planting the first olive tree beside the well. The court of gods and goddesses ruled that Athena had the better right to the land because she had given it the better gift. Olive wreaths were worn by brides and awarded to olympic victors.

The olive branch was one of the attributes of Eirene on Roman Imperial coins. For example, the reverse of a tetradrachm of Vespasian from Alexandria, 70-71 AD, shows Eirene standing holding a branch upward in her right hand.

The Roman poet Virgil (70–19 BC) associated "the plump olive" with the goddess Pax (the Roman Eirene) and he used the olive branch as a symbol of peace in his Aeneid:

High on the stern Aeneas his stand,
And held a branch of olive in his hand,
While thus he spoke: "The Phrygians' arms you see,
Expelled from Troy, provoked in Italy
By Latian foes, with war unjustly made;
At first affianced, and at last betrayed.
This message bear: The Trojans and their chief
Bring holy peace, and beg the king's relief."

For the Romans, there was an intimate relationship between war and peace, and Mars, the god of war, had another aspect, Mars Pacifer, Mars the bringer of Peace, who is shown on coins of the later Roman Empire bearing an olive branch. Appian describes the use of the olive-branch as a gesture of peace by the enemies of the Roman general Scipio Aemilianus in the Numantine War and by Hasdrubal the Boeotarch of Carthage.

Although peace was associated with the olive branch during the time of the Greeks, the symbolism became even stronger under the Pax Romana when envoys used olive branches as tokens of peace.

== Early Christianity ==
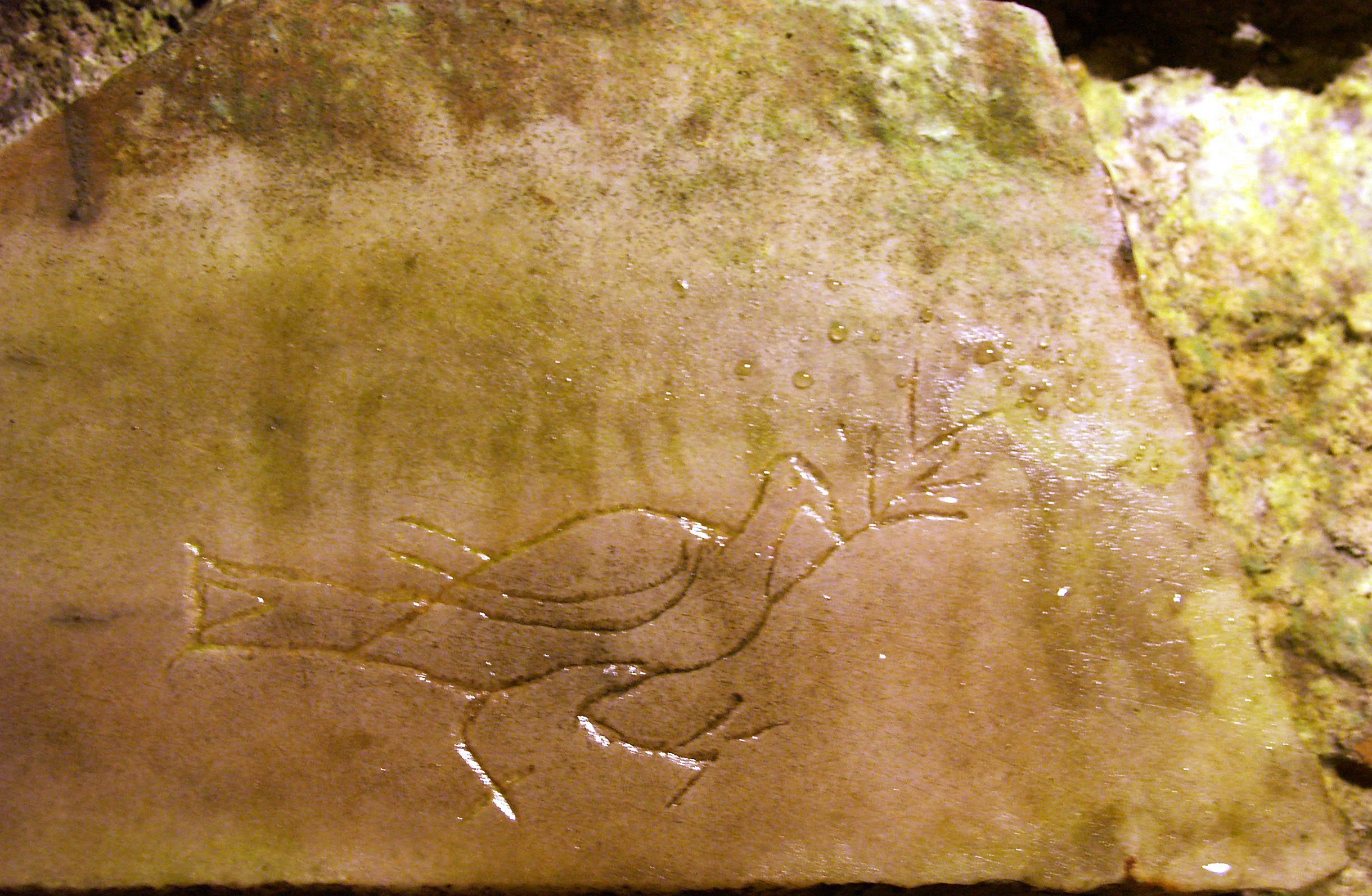
A dove with an olive branch, Catacombs of Domitilla, Rome

The olive branch appears with a dove in early Christian art. The dove derives from the simile of the Holy Spirit in the Gospels and the olive branch from classical symbolism. The early Christians, according to Winckelmann, often allegorized peace on their sepulchers by the figure of a dove bearing an olive branch in its beak. For example, in the Catacomb of Priscilla in Rome (2nd – 5th centuries AD) there is a depiction of three men (traditionally taken to be Shadrach, Meshach, and Abednego of the Book of Daniel) over whom hovers a dove with a branch; and in another of the Roman catacombs there is a shallow relief sculpture showing a dove with a branch flying to a figure marked in Greek ΕΙΡΗΝΗ (Eirene, or Peace).

Tertullian (c. 160 – c. 220) compared Noah's dove in the Hebrew Bible, who "announced to the world the assuagement of divine wrath, when she had been sent out of the ark and returned with the olive branch" with the Holy Spirit in baptism "bringing us the peace of God, sent out from the heavens". In his 4th-century Latin translation of the story of Noah, St Jerome rendered "leaf of olive" (Hebrew alé zayit) in Genesis 8:11 as "branch of olive" (Latin ramum olivae). In the 5th century, by which time a dove with an olive branch had become established as a Christian symbol of peace, St Augustine wrote in On Christian Doctrine that, "perpetual peace is indicated by the olive branch (oleae ramusculo) which the dove brought with it when it returned to the ark." However, in Jewish tradition, there is no association of the olive leaf with peace in the story of the flood.

== Modern usage ==
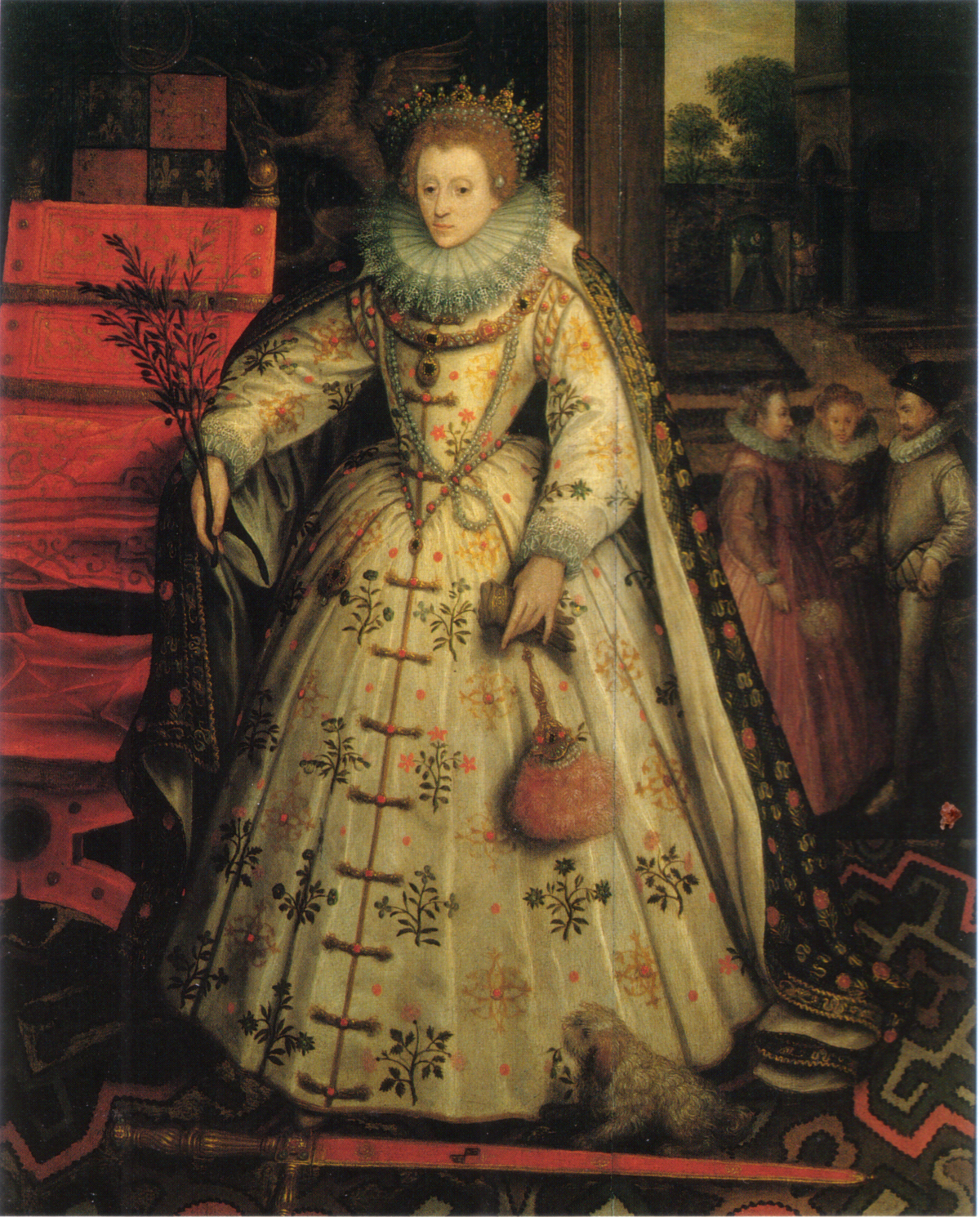
Portrait of Queen Elizabeth I by Marcus Gheeraerts the Elder, painted between 1580 and 1585, and showing her with an olive branch in her right hand and standing on the sword of Justice

An olive branch, sometimes held by a dove, was used as a peace symbol in 18th-century Britain, France and America. A 1729 portrait of Louis XV by François Lemoyne portrays him offering Europe an olive branch. A £2 note of North Carolina (1771) depicted the dove and olive with a motto meaning: "Peace restored". Georgia's $40 note of 1778 portrayed the dove and olive and a hand holding a dagger, with a motto meaning "Either war or peace, prepared for both." The olive branch appeared as a peace symbol in other 18th century prints. In January 1775, the frontispiece of the London Magazine published an engraving: "Peace descends on a cloud from the Temple of Commerce," in which the Goddess of Peace brings an olive branch to America and Britannia. A petition adopted by the American Continental Congress in July 1775 in the hope of avoiding a full-blown war with Great Britain was called the Olive Branch Petition.

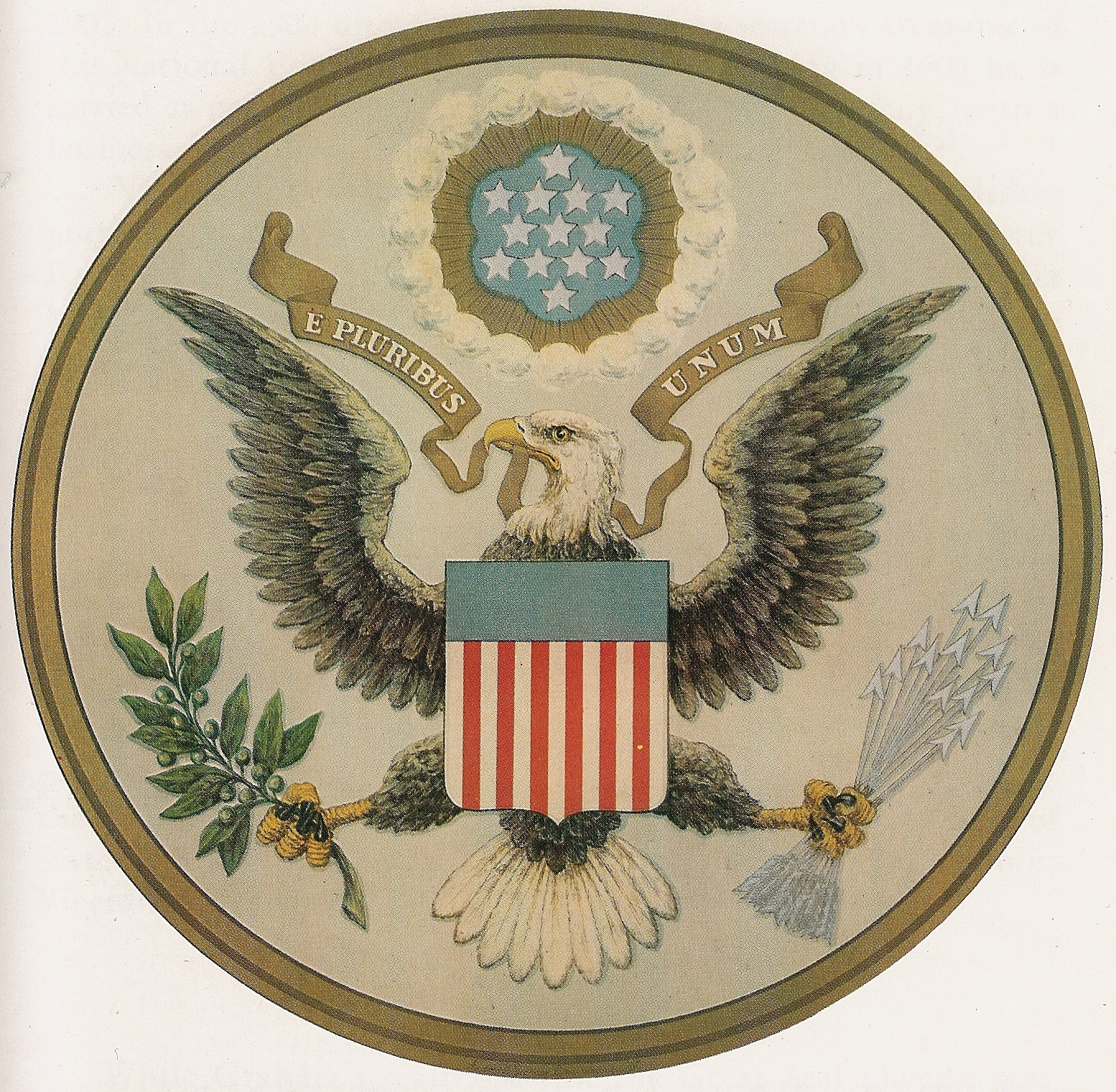
The 1885 obverse design of the Great Seal of the United States

On July 4, 1776, a resolution was passed that allowed the creation of the Great Seal of the United States. On the Great Seal, there is an eagle grasping an olive branch in its right talon. The olive branch traditionally has been recognized as a symbol for peace. It was added to the seal in March 1780 by the second committee appointed by Congress to design the seal. The olive branch has thirteen olives and thirteen olive leaves to represent the thirteen original colonies. Later on, the bald eagle and bundle of thirteen arrows were added. The idea of the olive branch opposing the bundle of thirteen arrows was to "denote the power of peace & war which is exclusively vested in Congress."

The flag of Cyprus and coat of arms of Cyprus both use olive branches as symbols of peace between the communities of the country; it also appears on the flag of Eritrea. Olive branches can be found in many police patches and badges across the world to signify peace.

The emblem of Israel includes two olive branches flanking a temple menorah. This may be based on the vision of the biblical prophet Zechariah, chapter 4, where he describes seeing a menorah flanked by two olive trees, one on each side.

The emblem and flag of the United Nations bear a pair of stylized olive branches surrounding a world map.

The olive branch is a symbol of peace in Arab folk traditions. In 1974, Palestinian leader Yasser Arafat brought an olive branch to the UN General Assembly and said, "Today I have come bearing an olive branch and a freedom-fighter's gun. Do not let the olive branch fall from my hand."

Several towns have been named Olive Branch as a symbol of peaceful living, such as Olive Branch, Mississippi. Some Western given names and surnames, such as "Oliver", "Olivier" and "Olifant" allude to an olive branch.

== Gallery ==
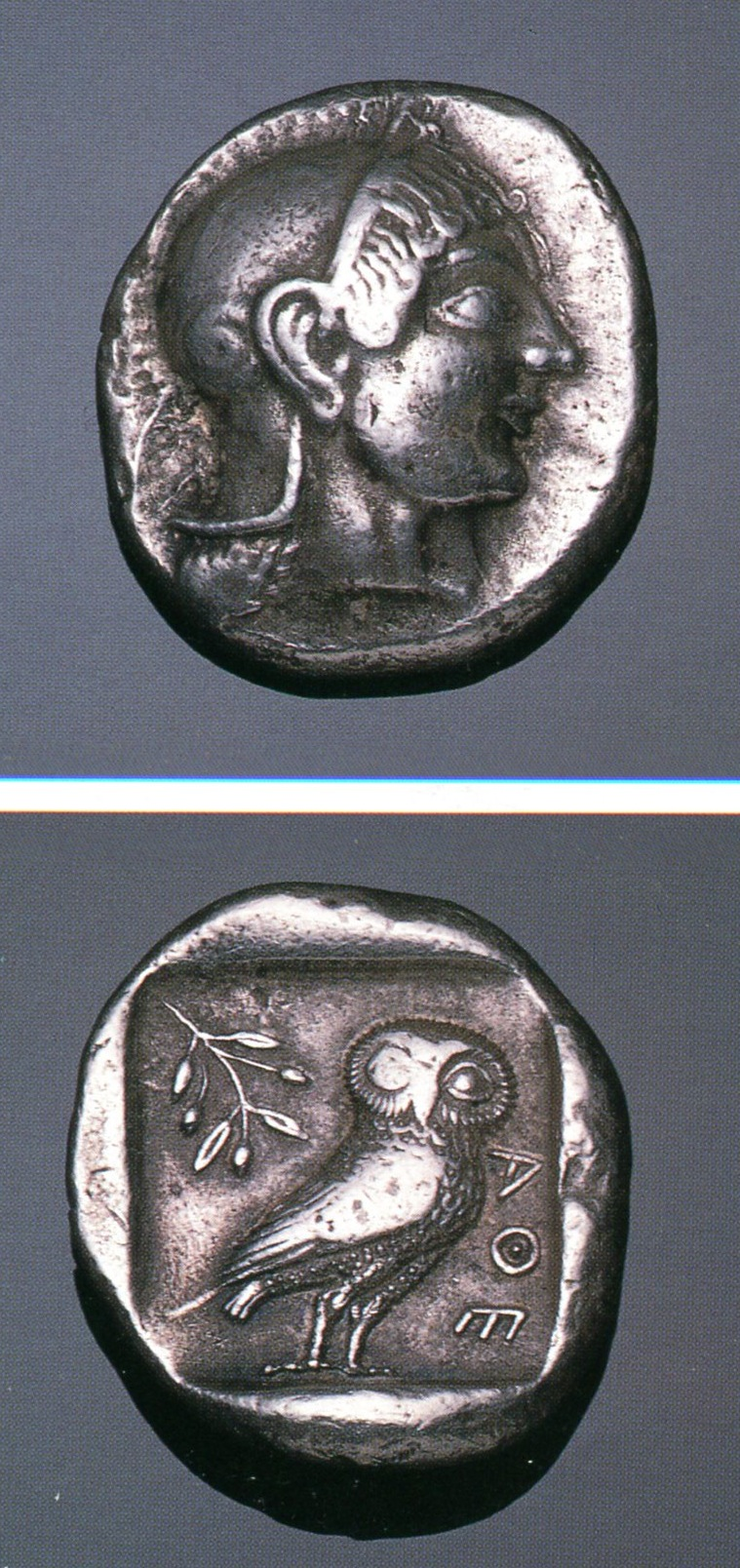
Greek silver tetradrachm of Athens (Attica). Goddess Athena and an owl with an olive branch. 6th century BC

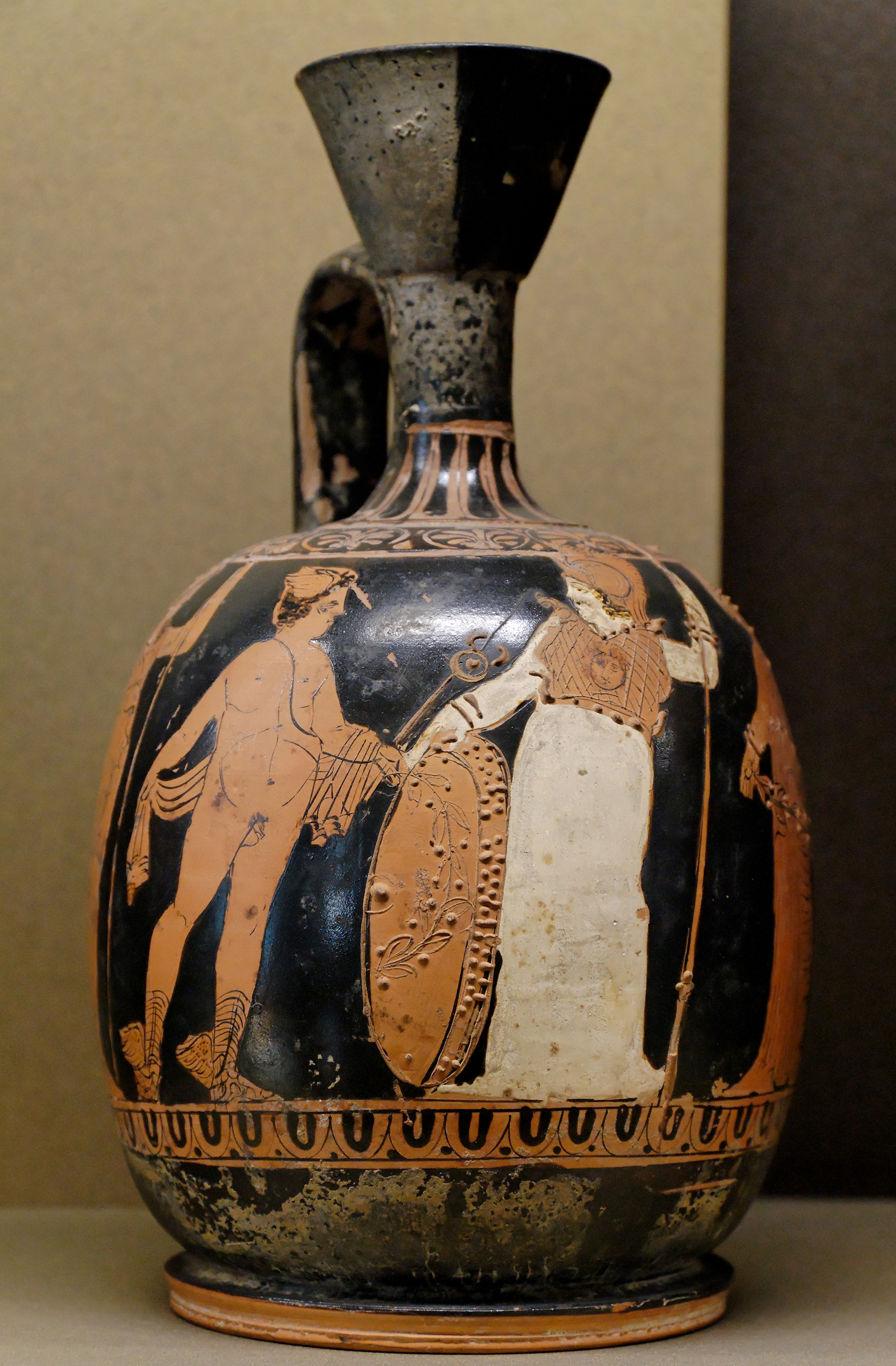
Athena bearing an olive branch as a pattern on her shield. Ancient Greek Attic red-figure lekythos, ca. 400 BC, from Athens

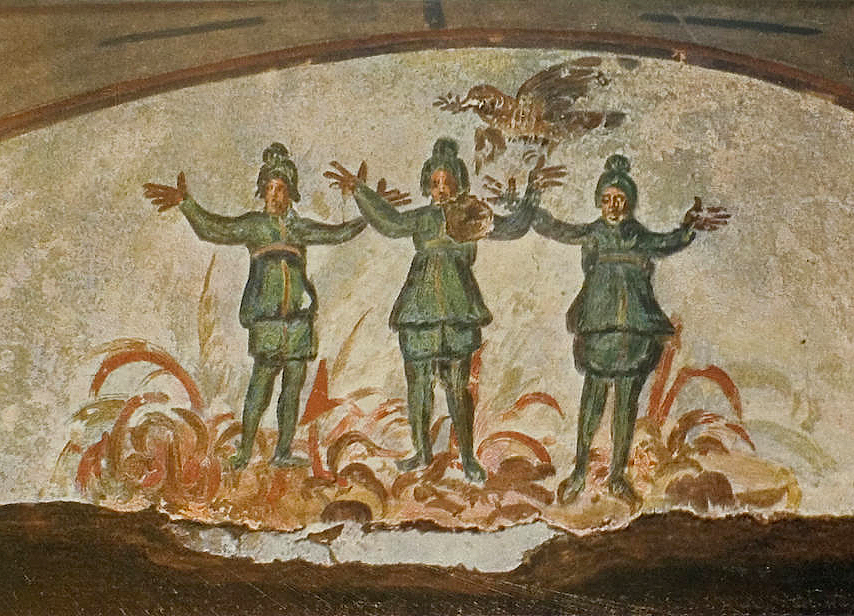
Wall painting from the early Christian Catacomb of Priscilla in Rome, 3rd/4th century AD, showing three figures in a fire above whom flies a dove with a branch in its beak

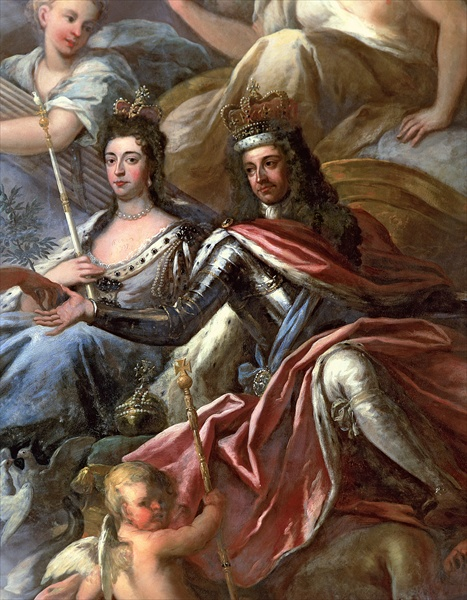
William III and Mary II receive the olive branch from Peace. Painting by James Thornhill, c.1700, Old Royal Naval College, Greenwich

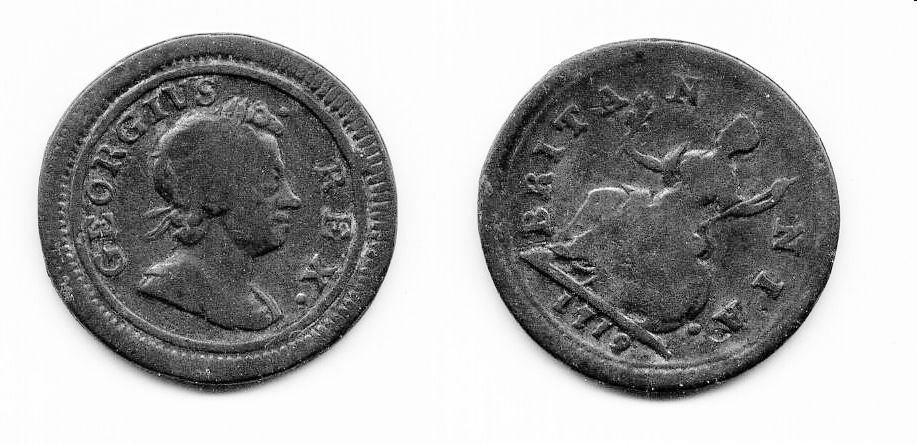
George I farthing, 1719, showing Britannia with a sword and olive branch

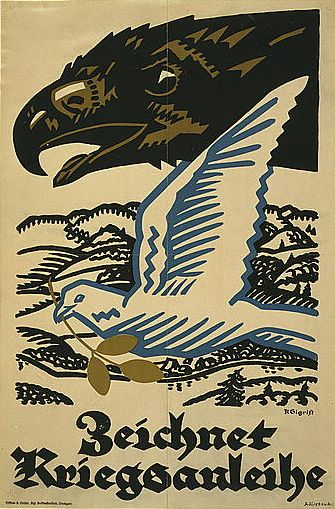
A German war loan poster, 1917

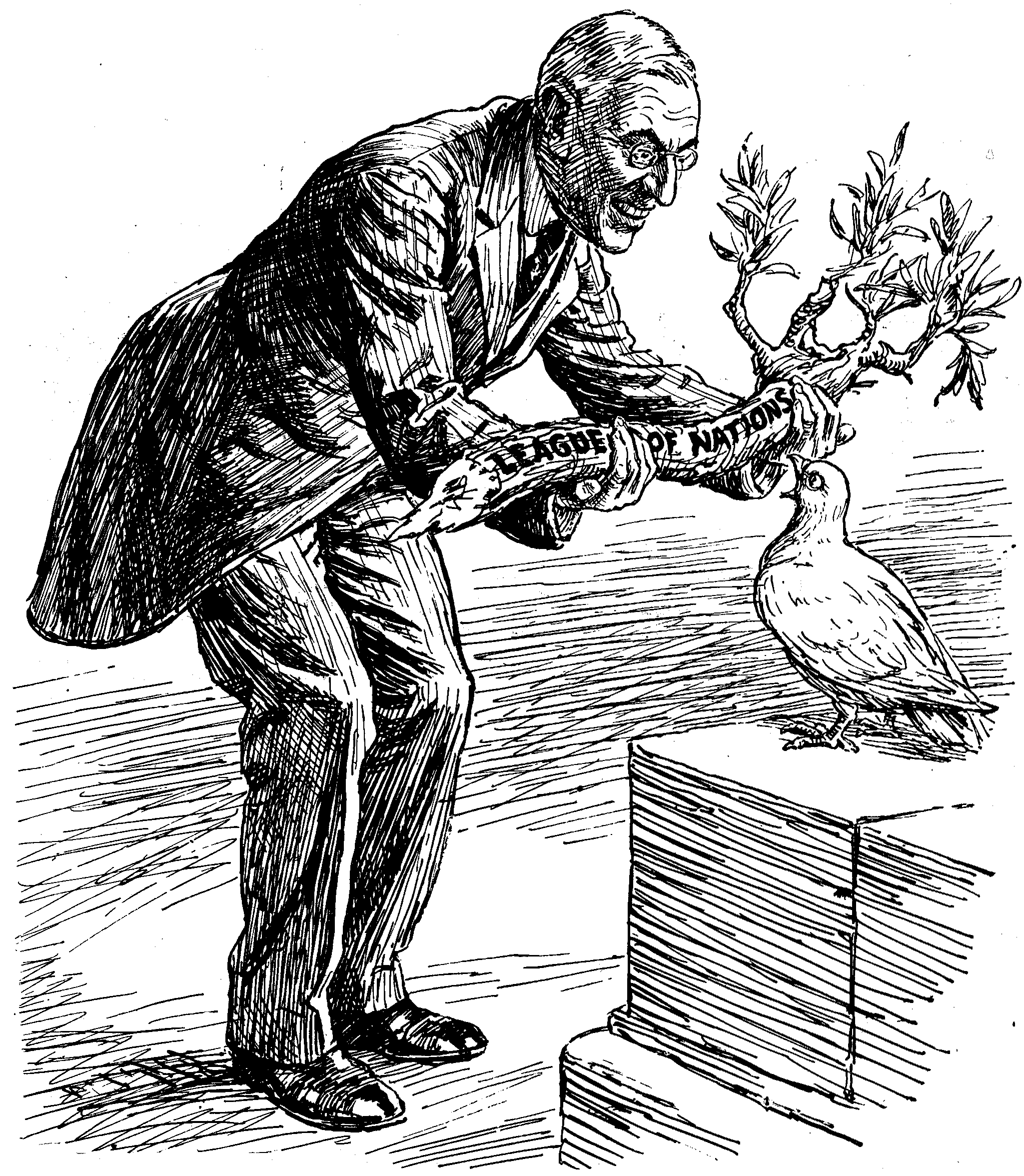
Cartoon from Punch, 1919. "OVERWEIGHTED. President Wilson: 'Here's your olive branch. Now get busy.' Dove of Peace: 'Of course I want to please everybody; but isn't this a bit thick?'"

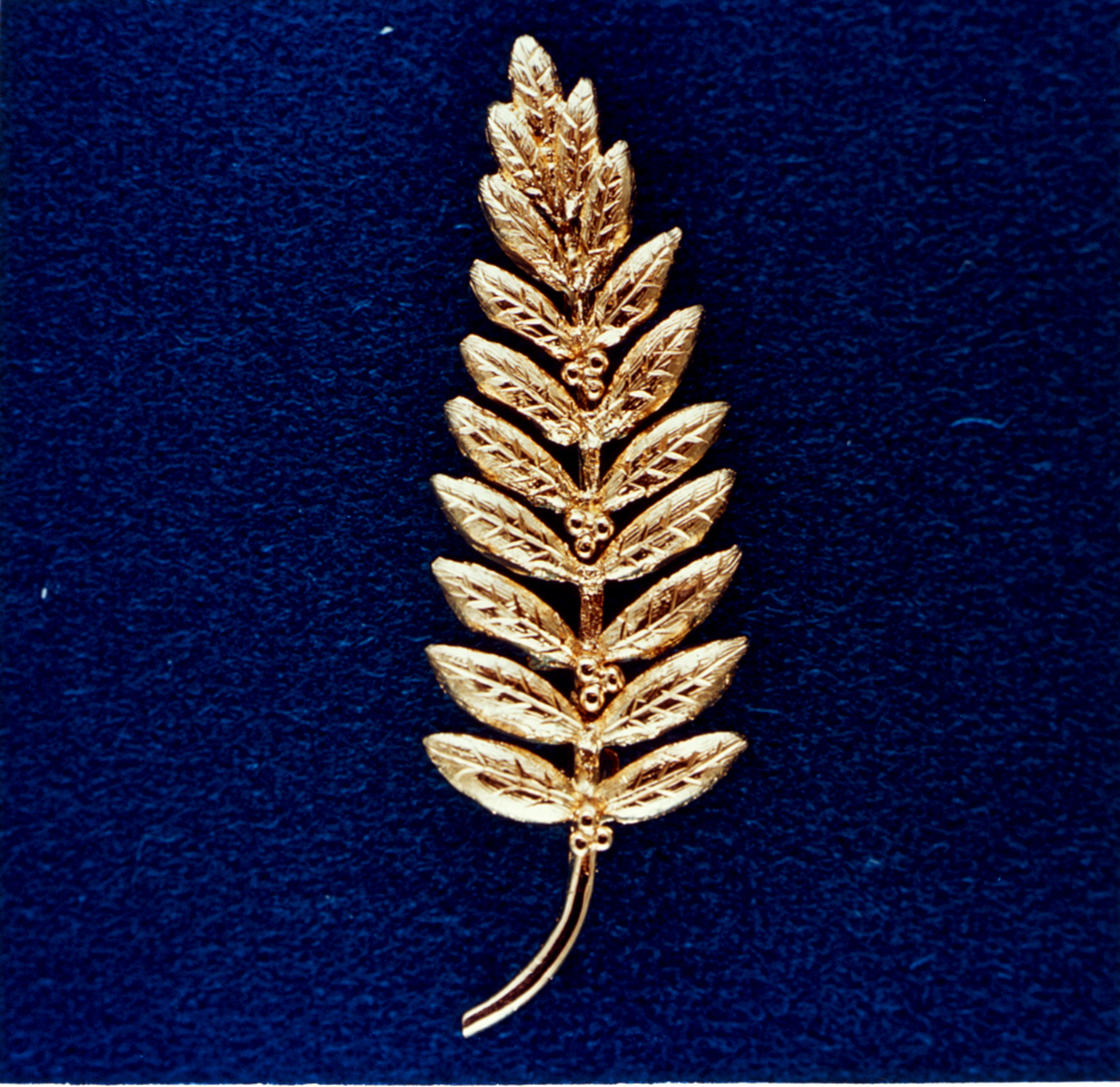
Golden olive branch left on the Moon by Neil Armstrong on the 1969 Apollo 11 mission as a symbol of peace.

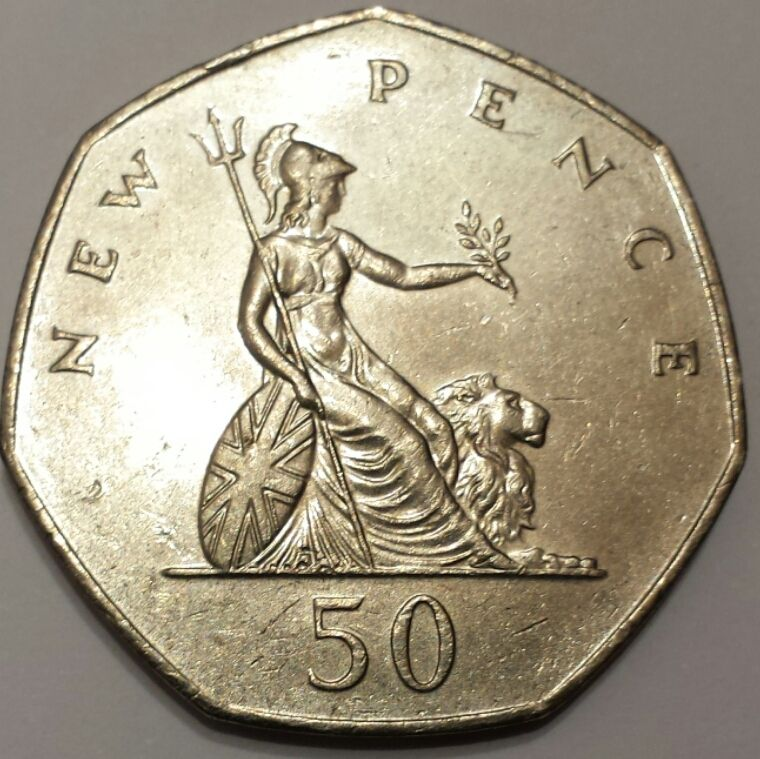
Fifty pence of the late 20th century showing Britannia with a trident and olive branch

Emblem of the United Nations, with stylized olive branches

== See also ==
- Banner of Peace
- Epimenides
- Flag of the United Nations
- Olive wreath
- Peace flag
- Peace movement
- Peace symbols
- Peace walk
- Pacifism
- Sadako and the Thousand Paper Cranes
- White poppy
- Category:Coats of arms with olive branches
