= Peace flag =

Proposed flag to represent world peace

One design for an international peace flag

There have been several designs for a peace flag.

== White-bordered national flag ==
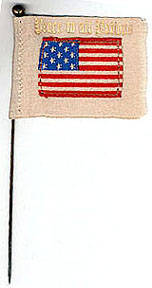
White-bordered US flag. Banner reads "Peace to All Nations".

The white flag is recognized in most of the world as a flag of surrender, truce or ceasefire. The first mention of a white flag used in this context is made during the Eastern Han dynasty (AD 25–220). A white flag was also used by the anti-war movement during the US Civil War in 1861.

In 1891, the third Universal Peace Congress in Rome devised a generalized Peace Flag design, which was simply the home nation's flag bordered in white to signify non-violent conflict resolution. This was used (although not officially adopted) by the American Peace Society and the Universal Peace Union. It was designed by Henry Pettit.

== The Pro Concordia Labor flag ==
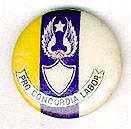
Button depicting the peace flag

1904 simplified design of the flag of universal peace

In the 1890s, expatriate American Cora Slocomb di Brazza Savorgnan, the Countess Di Brazzà, invented a universal peace flag with three upright bands: yellow, purple, and white, which became the peace flag of the International Peace Bureau. Originally, there was a complicated symbol on the middle band: "a shield ... surmounted by a man's and a woman's clasped hands, sustained by a pair of dove wings with a white star aloft; on the shield can appear any device chosen by the association adopting the flag, or simply the number of enrollment among the users of the flag, or the motto Pro Concordia Labor (For Peace I Work), or this motto may be placed upon a ribbon on the flag beneath the shield, or on a streamer (white) from the flag staff (blue, the color of promise) surmounted by a star with the motto of the association or individual using the flag upon the other white streamer".

This flag was adopted by the International Council of Women in 1896. In 1904, it lost the complicated design and became a simple tricolor.

== The Earth flag ==
The Universal Peace Congress' world peace flag

James William van Kirk, a Methodist minister from Youngstown, Ohio designed the first world peace flag of the Earth, using rainbow stripes, stars and a globe. In 1913 and 1929, he made a peace tour through Europe with his flag. He traveled around the world arguing for "the brotherhood of man and the Fatherhood of God".

The Universal Peace Congress eventually came to adopt Kirk's flag as its official World Peace Flag, and it was subsequently adopted by the American Peace Society as well as other groups. It consisted of "the earth on a blue field covered with white stars; a white band crossed the globe and to the left was broken up into a spectrum representing the variations of the human race—different, but united in peace". The flag also shows 46 stars surrounding the globe and the spectrum.

In 1938, Kirk authored an autobiography, Stranger than fiction: four times around the world, designer of world flag, a world builder, at 80 years makes a new start in life.

== The Banner of Peace ==
Roerich Pact Banner of Peace

The banner of peace is a symbol of the Roerich Pact. This pact was the first international treaty dedicated to the protection of artistic and scientific institutions and historical monuments. It was signed on 15 April 1935. The banner of peace was proposed by Nicholas Roerich for an international pact for the protection of culture values.

== The Rainbow flag ==
The rainbow colored PACE flag, (Italian for 'peace')

The most common recent design is a rainbow flag representing peace, first used in Italy at a peace march in 1961. The flag was inspired by similar multi-coloured flags used in demonstrations against nuclear weapons. A previous version had featured a dove drawn by Pablo Picasso.

The most common variety has seven colours—purple, blue, azure, green, yellow, orange, and red—and is emblazoned in bold with the Italian word PACE, meaning "peace".

It became popular with the Pace da tutti i balconi ("peace from every balcony") campaign in 2002, started as a protest against the impending invasion of Iraq. At that time its use was met with criticism from the Italian LGBT community for being too similar to the LGBT six-color gay pride flag (which was originally created in San Francisco California in 1979 and had started being used regularly in Italy a couple of years earlier during the 2000 inaugural WorldPride celebration in Rome). The flag was flown from balconies in all Italian cities by citizens against the war. Its use spread to other countries too, and the Italian Pace was sometimes, but not everywhere, replaced with the corresponding translation in the local languages.

According to Amnesty International, producer Franco Belsito had produced about 1,000 flags per year for 18 years, and suddenly had to cope with a demand in the range of the millions.

Common variations include moving the purple stripe down below the azure one, and adding a white stripe on top.

The seven-color peace flag is not to be confused with the similar six-color LGBT pride flag, which does not have azure and has the colors in the opposite order with red at the top.

== The Peace Flag initiative ==
"The Peace Flag" is an initiative that aims to unify all nations underneath one common symbol on International Peace Day. While there are various icons of peace – the olive branch, the dove – there is no official world flag of peace adopted by the United Nations. This initiative proposes that, for one day a year on 21 September, every country raises an all-white version of their national flag to represent that we are all one. In 2013, embassies of Colombia, Equatorial Guinea and Ecuador in London officially agreed to support The Peace Flag initiative by raising a colorless version of their respective flags on 21 September. The initiative was nominated for a White Pencil in 2012 at D&AD for its contribution towards peace, in support of Peace One Day.

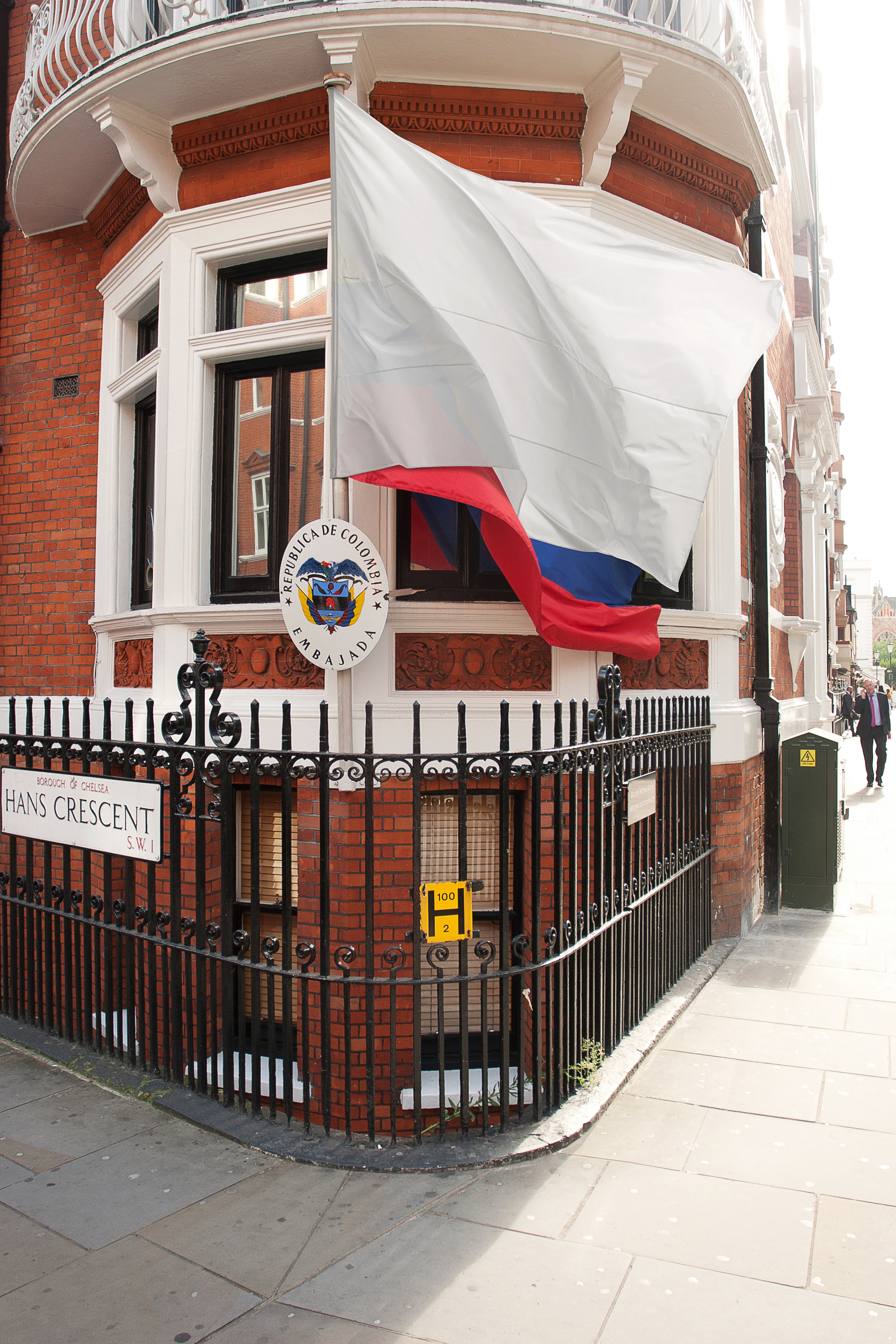
Colombian Flag of Peace

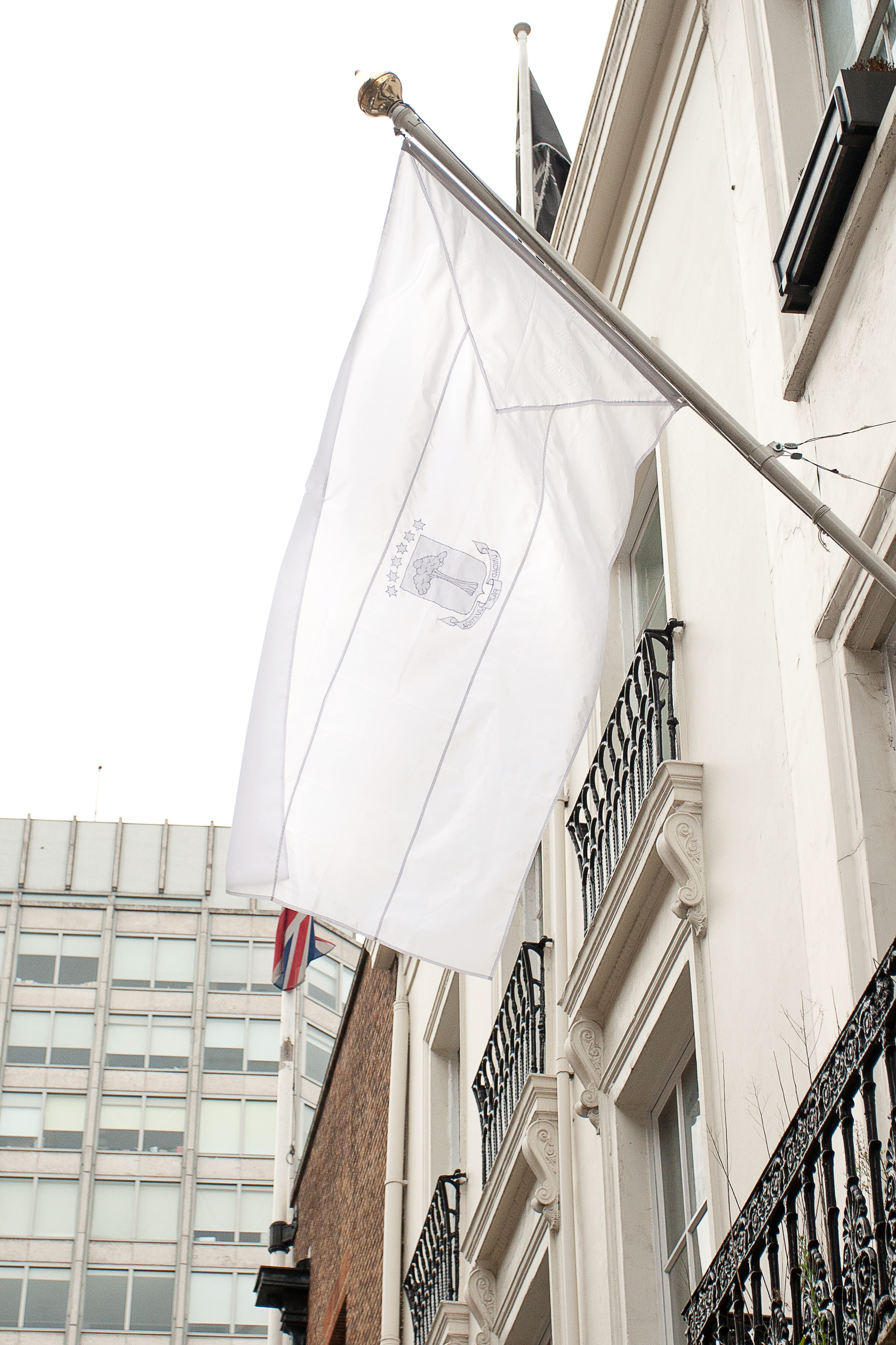
Equatorial Guinean Flag of Peace

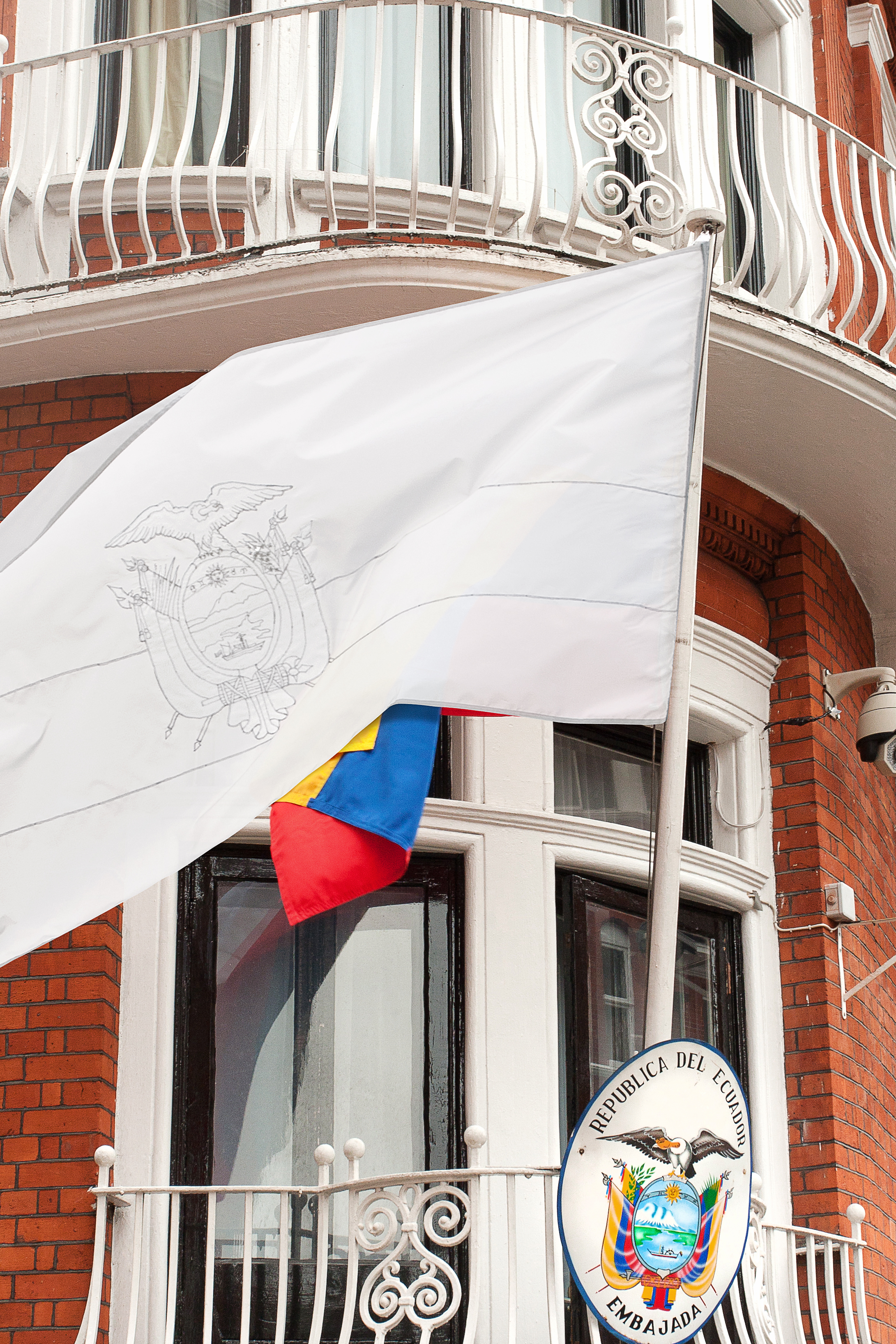
Ecuadorian Flag of Peace

=== The largest peace flag ===
The first large peace flag was made in Lecce, Salento, Italy by the association "GPace - Youth for peace" on Saturday, 14 November 2009. It was 21 m × 40 m (70 by 130 feet). Three years later this record was broken. On 21 September 2012, the Belgian Peace Organisation (30 m × 50 m/100 by 165 feet) in the historic center of Ghent. The action aimed to reinforce the demand to disarm in order to make room for sustainable development. The largest peace flag was made in Prato, Tuscany, Italy with the fabrics produced in the city and showed at the Italian liberation day (25 April 2003) on the hill around the city to protest against the war in Iraq . It was approximately 1000m×13m (3280,84 ft × 42,65 ft). The flag was paraded through the streets of Prato again on 25 April 2025.

== Gallery ==
United States flag with peace sign canton

Greek language rainbow peace flag

Light Dispersion Flag

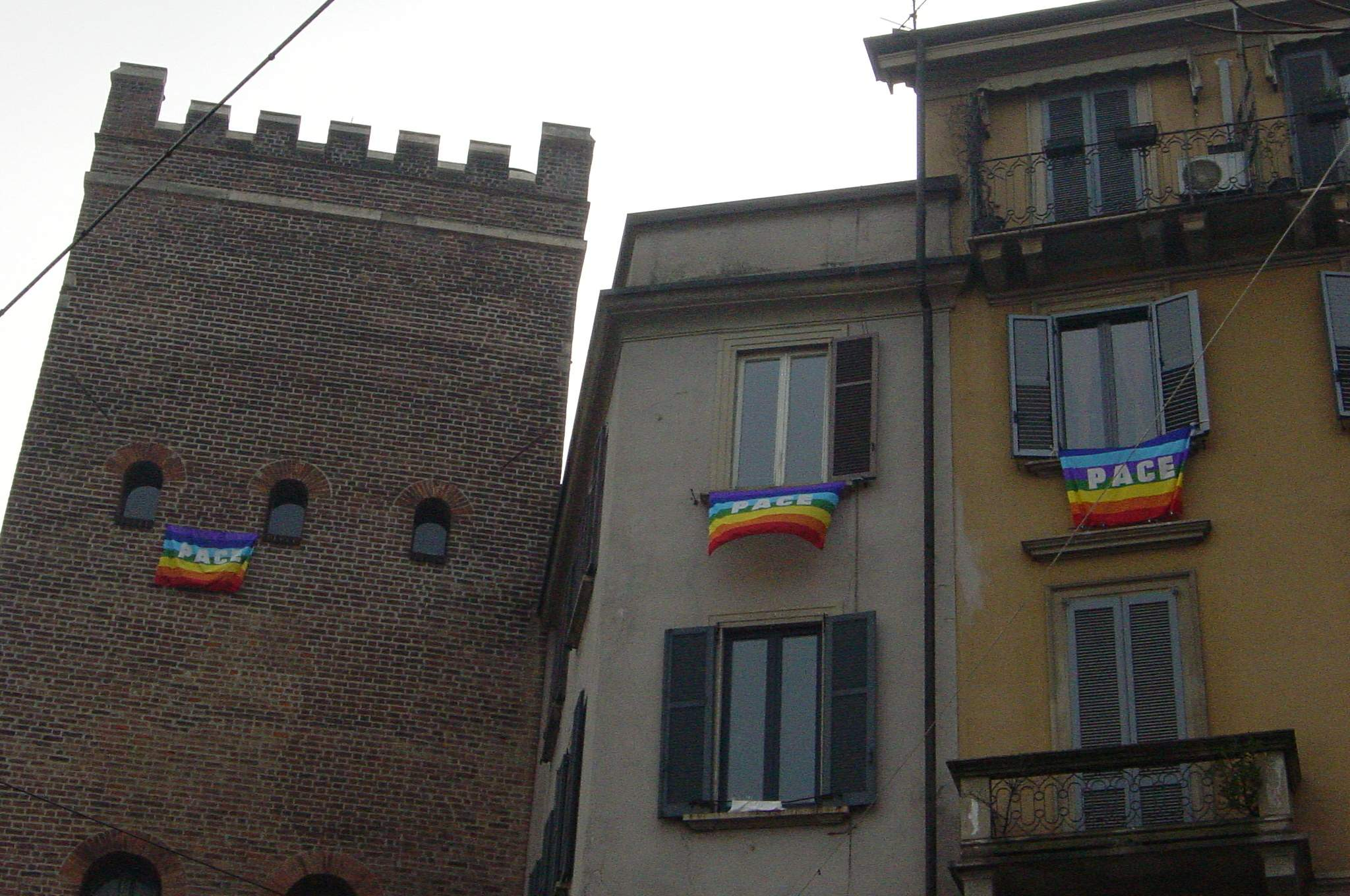
"Pace da tutti i balconi": peace flags hanging from windows in Milan, Italy, in March 2003. Over 1,000,000 were hung against the Iraq war.

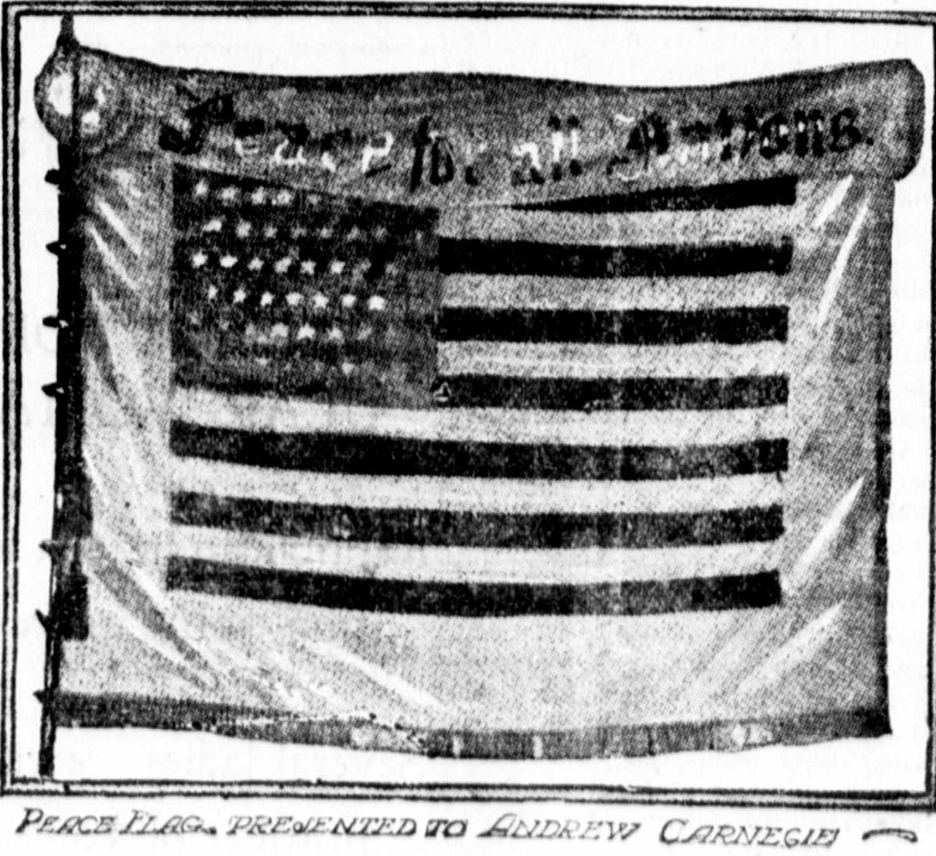
American Peace Flag, 1904

== See also ==
- Peace symbols
- Peace movement
- White-blue-white flag (Russian anti-war flag)
- Flag of Earth
- Rainbow flag

== Bibliography ==
- Allen, Devere (1930). The Fight for Peace. New York: Macmillan – via Google Books.
