= Maria Barbella =

American convict (1868–1950)

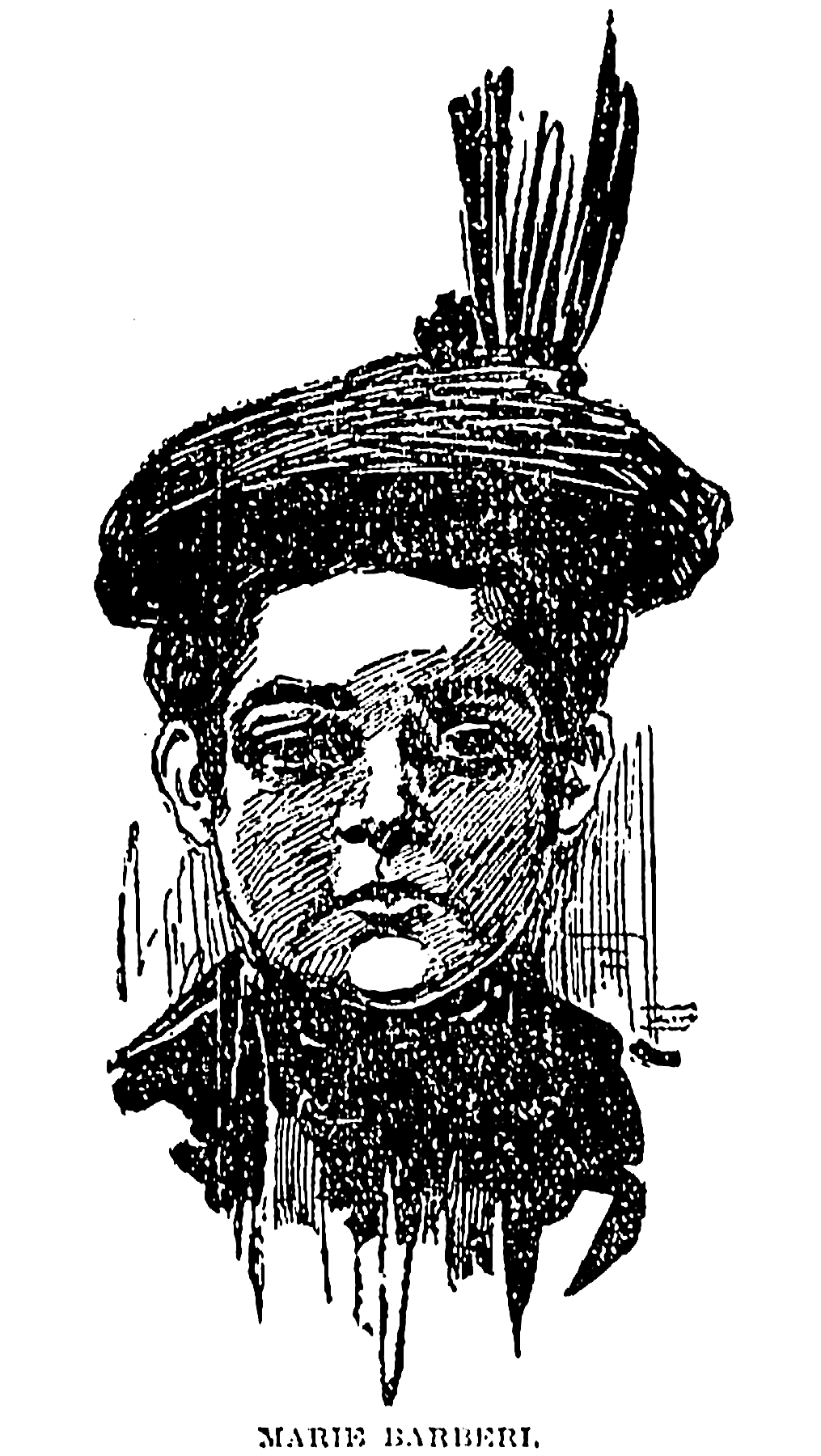
- Born: October 24, 1868; Ferrandina, Kingdom of Italy
- Died: March 24, 1950 (aged 81); New York City, U.S.
- Other name: Maria Barberi
- Known for: Second woman sentenced to die in the electric chair

Maria Barbella (October 24, 1868 – March 24, 1950) was an Italian-born American woman. Erroneously known as Maria Barberi at the time, she was the second woman sentenced to die in the electric chair. She was convicted of killing Domenico Cataldo in 1895, but the ruling was overturned in 1896 and she was freed. Her trial became a cause célèbre in the late 19th century.

== Life ==
Barbella was born in Ferrandina, Italy. Her family immigrated to Mulberry Bend, New York, in 1892. After living in the United States for nearly a year, she met Domenico Cataldo, who was from the same region of Italy. She worked in a factory and every day she would pass Cataldo's shoeshine booth. They spent much time together but Maria kept these meetings secret from her overprotective father, Michele. However, her father eventually found out about Cataldo and forbade Maria to ever see or speak to him again. Despite this, Cataldo continued to pursue Maria until she finally agreed to see him again.

One day Cataldo took her to a boarding house, where he allegedly drugged her with the drink he bought her, then raped her. After demanding that he marry her, Cataldo showed her a savings book with a $400 deposit and promised he would. Maria continued to live with him at the boarding house, and Cataldo continued to put the marriage off for several months. He was, in fact, already married to a woman in Italy and they had children. The traditional code of honor of southern Italy was deeply rooted in Maria. She knew that her family would be a subject of public shame within the Italian American community if Domenico left her unwed.

Devastated when Cataldo told her that he was ending their relationship and returning to Italy, Barbella told her mother about the situation. Her mother confronted Cataldo and insisted he marry Barbella, but he said he would only do that if they paid him $200. In New York City on April 26, 1895, at approximately 9:30 am, Domenico Cataldo was playing cards in a saloon on East 13th Street, and had planned to board a ship leaving for Italy that afternoon. Barbella entered the bar and there was a brief exchange. "Only a pig can marry you!" were his last words. Barbella produced a straight razor and slashed his neck so swiftly Cataldo had no chance to scream. He staggered out the door, clutching his throat with both hands, knocking Barbella over, spraying blood everywhere. Finally, as he reached Avenue A, he lurched off the curb and fell twitching into the gutter, where he died.

== Trial ==
Barbella was arrested and put in The New York Halls of Justice and House of Detention (otherwise known as "The Tombs") for 2.5 months. Her appointed attorneys were Amos Evans and Henry Sedgwick. The trial began on July 11. This case stirred up controversy because Italians felt that the verdict was unjust since there were no Italians in the jury. At the time of the trial, Barbella was unable to speak or understand English. On the morning of April 26, 1895, Barbella confronted Cataldo outside a saloon at 428 East Thirteenth Street, where he had been playing cards with three other Italians. When she asked "Are you going to marry me?" he replied "No; go away from here. I am going away." She drew a razor and slashed his throat; he staggered across the street and died at the corner of Thirteenth Street and Avenue A, five minutes after the attack. Her eight-year-old brother John was among those nearby at the time. She admitted everything: how she slit his throat and how he ran after her, but couldn't reach her and had dropped dead. The jury was shown to have felt sympathy for her case; however, according to Recorder Goff, "The verdict was in accordance with the facts, and no other verdict could, in view of the evidence, have been considered." The jury declared Barbella guilty and she was sent to Sing Sing prison where she was sentenced to death by electric chair on August 19, 1895. She was the second woman sentenced to be executed by electric chair (after serial killer Lizzie Halliday's commuted 1894 conviction).

== Second trial and release ==
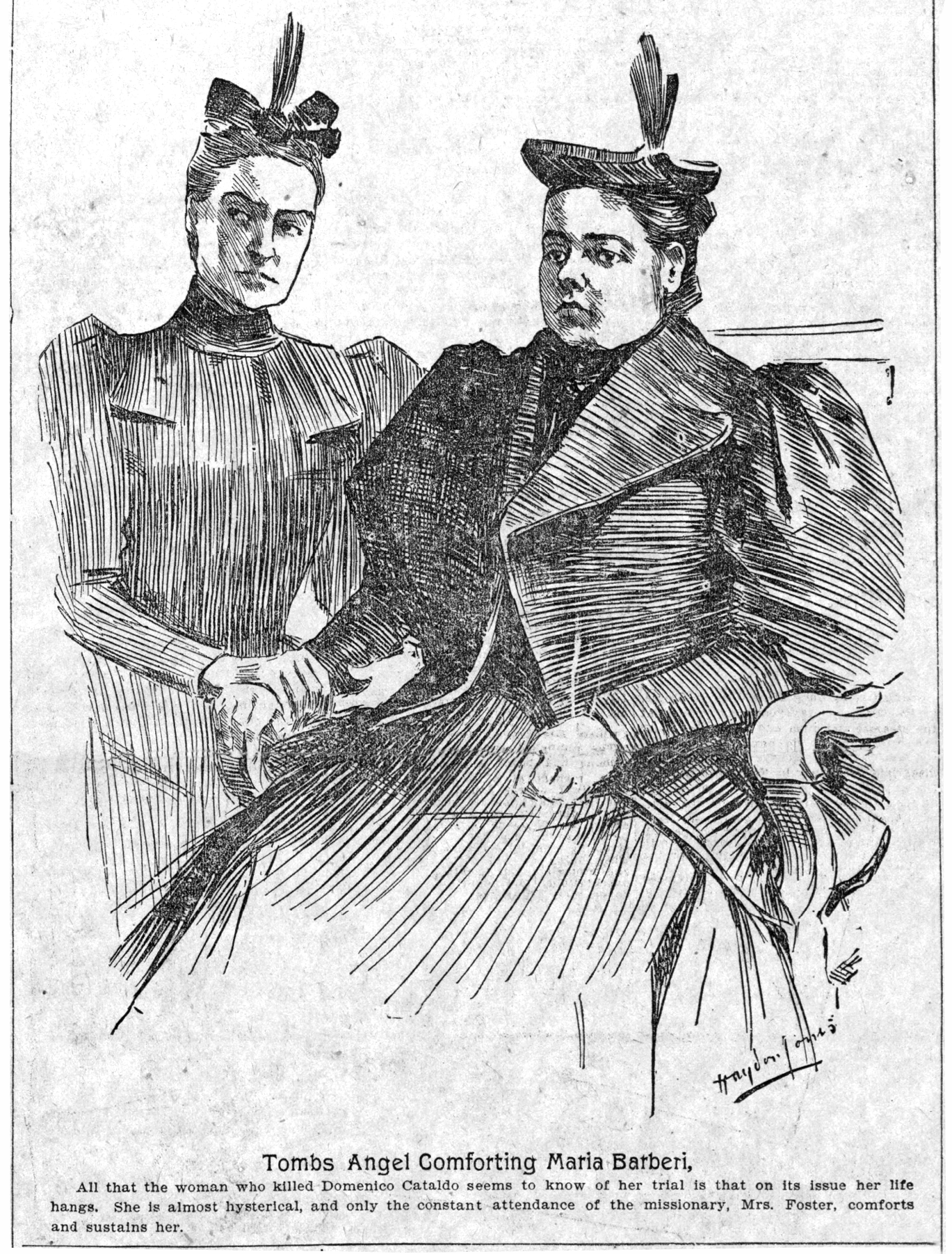
Maria Barbella at her second trial attended by "Tombs Angel" Rebecca Salome Foster

Many complained to Governor Levi Morton about how the situation was handled, but it seemed nothing could be done. She was granted an appeal on the basis of the judge's jury instructions, which explicitly argued in favor of conviction. While awaiting retrial at Sing Sing, Barbella was taught to read and write English by Mrs. Sage, wife of the warden, and Matron Vincent. In a letter to The World dated May 8, 1896, written from the Tombs after her transfer there ahead of the retrial, Barbella credited the Countess di Brazza, the Cristoforo Colombo newspaper, and Prof. Vincenzo Palumbo of Mott Street with saving her life, noting that Palumbo had secured 27 affidavits from witnesses not called at her first trial, which were now in the hands of her lawyers Friend, House & Grossman, who were working without compensation. On November 16, 1896, she was given a second trial. This time, counsel presented a much more sympathetic case: that she was a rape victim whose experience exacerbated her preexisting epilepsy. She allegedly suffered a seizure and lost her reason. She was found not guilty.

== Later life ==
After her release from prison, she again made headlines for rescuing a neighbor who had accidentally set herself on fire. Barbella grabbed a blanket and beat the fire out with her hands. Barbella married an Italian immigrant named Francesco Paolo Bruno on November 4, 1897. In 1899, she had a son named Frederick. In 1902, she was living with her parents, and her husband. In a 1940 census, she is listed as Mary di Chiara with her second husband, Ernesto, on Pike Street in Manhattan. She died on March 24, 1950, and is buried in the Old Calvary cemetery as Mary di Chiara.

== In popular culture ==
"Illicit and Lethal" - episode about Maria Barbella's life from the documentary Deadly Women, originally aired on Discovery Channel in 2017.

The November 1, 2019, episode of the podcast The Memory Palace tells her story.
