= Moruzzo =

Moruzzo Murùs (Friulian)
- Comune
- Comune di Moruzzo
- Location within Italy Location within Friuli-Venezia Giulia
- Coordinates: 46°7′N 13°7′E
- Country: Italy
- Region: Friuli-Venezia Giulia
- Province: Udine (UD)
- Frazioni: Alnicco, Brazzacco, Telezae, Modotto, Santa Margherita del Gruagno

Area
  - Total: 17.9 km^{2} (6.9 sq mi)

Population (Dec. 2004)
  - Total: 2,240
  - Density: 125/km^{2} (324/sq mi)
- Time zone: UTC+1 (CET)
  - Summer (DST): UTC+2 (CEST)
- Postal code: 33030
- Dialing code: 0432
- Website: Official website

Moruzzo (Friulian: Murùs) is a comune (municipality) in the Regional decentralization entity of Udine in the Italian region of Friuli-Venezia Giulia, located about 80 kilometres (50 mi) northwest of Trieste and about 11 kilometres (7 mi) northwest of Udine. As of 31 December 2004, it had a population of 2,240 and an area of 17.9 square kilometres (6.9 mi^{2}).

The municipality of Moruzzo contains the frazioni (boroughs) of Alnicco, Brazzacco, Telezae, Modotto, and Santa Margherita del Gruagno.

Moruzzo borders the following municipalities: Colloredo di Monte Albano, Fagagna, Martignacco, Pagnacco.

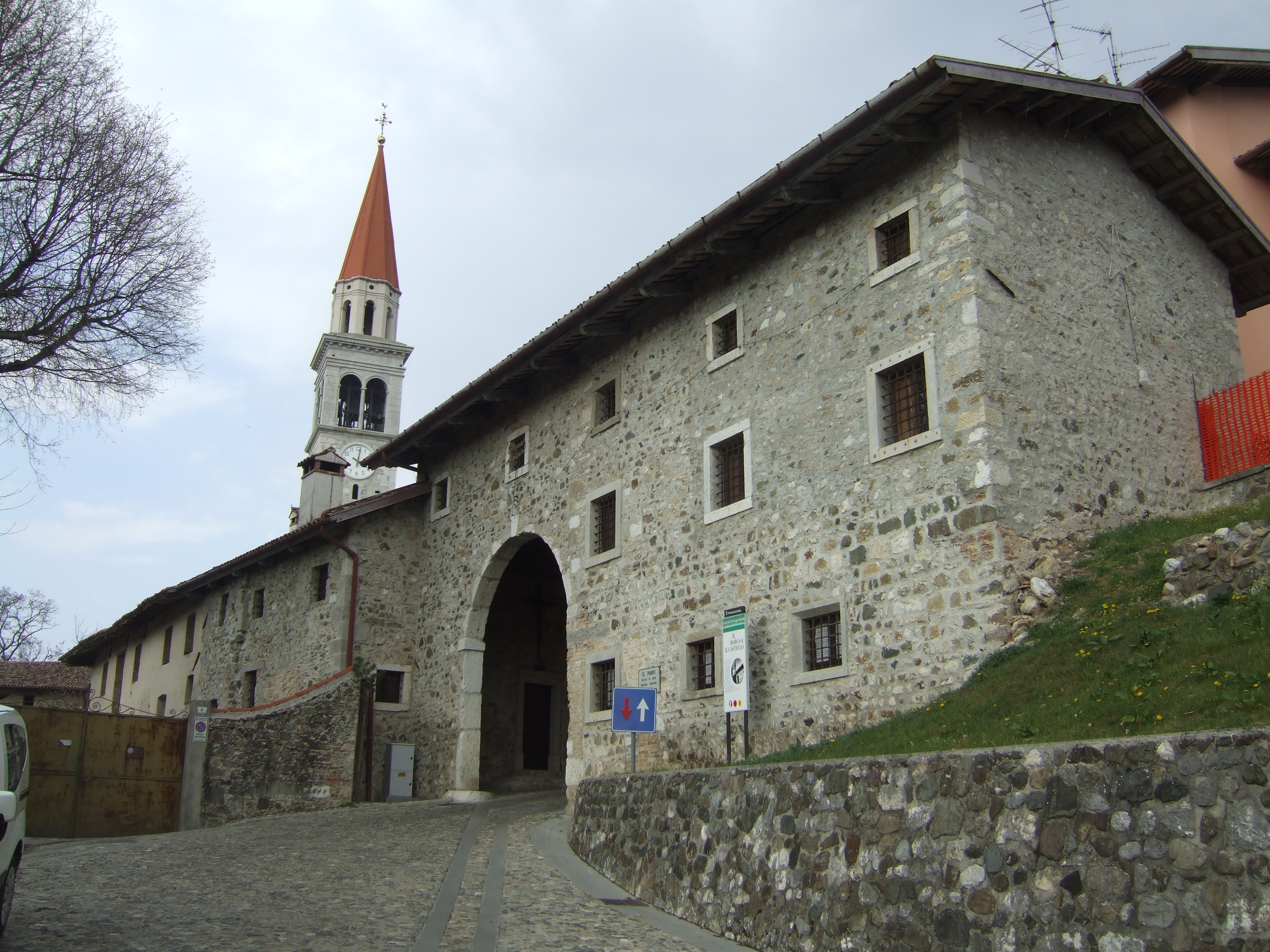
Entrance to the fortified village of Santa Margherita del Gruagno.

== Demographic evolution ==
Historical population

Year	Pop.	±%
1861	?	—
1871	1,673	—
1881	1,768	+5.7%
1901	2,001	+13.2%
1911	2,494	+24.6%

Year	Pop.	±%
1921	2,652	+6.3%
1931	2,228	−16.0%
1936	2,021	−9.3%
1951	2,264	+12.0%
1961	2,025	−10.6%

Year	Pop.	±%
1971	1,848	−8.7%
1981	2,096	+13.4%
1991	2,128	+1.5%
2001	2,170	+2.0%

Source: Data from ISTAT
