= Lusty Lady =

Defunct peep show establishments

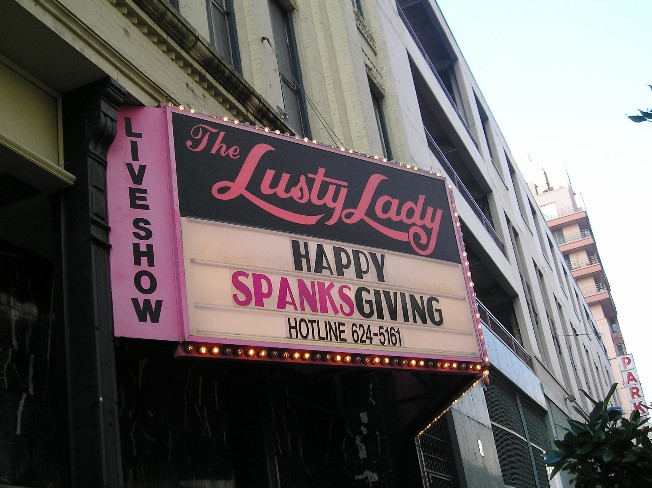
- Marquee of the Seattle Lusty Lady, Thanksgiving, 2005
- Location: Seattle; San Francisco
- Type: Peep show

Construction
- Opened: 1970s
- Demolished: 2010

Lusty Lady was the name of a pair of peep show establishments, one in downtown Seattle and one in the North Beach district of San Francisco. The Lusty Lady was made famous by the labor activism of its San Francisco workers and the publication of several books about working there.

== History ==
The Seattle Lusty Lady, known originally as the Amusement Center, was opened in the 1970s by two business associates, who soon after opened the other location in San Francisco. Originally, both Lusty Ladys showed 16mm peep show films only; in 1983 live nude dancers were added and became the main focus of the businesses. Until 2003 they were both owned by the same company; in that year the San Francisco franchise was bought by the strippers working there and began to be managed as a worker cooperative. The San Francisco branch had already entered the news in 1997 when it became the first successfully unionized sex business in the U.S. The San Diego strip club Pacers had seen a unionization effort in the early 1990s, but it was short-lived, and the Los Angeles club Star Garden successfully unionized under the Actors' Equity Association in 2023.

The Seattle branch closed in June 2010. The San Francisco branch closed at 3 a.m. on September 2, 2013, on Labor Day.

== Operation ==
The Lusty Lady featured exotic dancers in a peep show setting on the main stage and in one-on-one booths.

The main stage featured several nude women dancing, separated by glass windows from the customers who each stood in their own booth, paying by the minute. The dancers were also available for more explicit private shows in the VIP and Private Pleasures booths. These were also glass-separated private booths where customers could give direction to the show and tipping was possible. Rates for shows varied by the dancer. The Private Pleasures booth also occasionally featured "Double Trouble" shows, with two dancers who might have performed a lesbian sex show. In addition, booths showing adult videos 24/7 were available.

Once a year, The Lusty Lady SF organized a "Play Day": the dancers came out from behind the glass, explained the operation of the club to customers, and allowed behind-the-scenes peeks.

Lusty Lady occasionally featured "art days", exhibiting erotic photographs and paintings in the hallways. In February 2002, both peep shows featured a video art exhibition called "Peepshow 28", with one channel in all video booths devoted to showing a sequence of 64 short videos exploring voyeurism, exhibitionism and sexuality.

Dancers were paid an hourly wage. (The top wage for dancers in Seattle in 2001 was $27 per hour, the top wage in San Francisco in 2003 was $26 per hour.)

== Seattle ==
47°36′24.8″N 122°20′18.5″W

The Seattle Lusty Lady opened in the 1970s and moved to its final location at 1315 First Avenue in downtown Seattle near Pike Place Market in 1985. The club was well known for its frequently changing and often amusing marquee announcements. The Lusty Lady is immediately across the street from the Seattle Art Museum and the marquee often commented on current exhibits or the Hammering Man statue. Mimi Gates, stepmother of Bill Gates and director of the Seattle Art Museum, said "The Lusty Lady's marquee is a Seattle landmark." Nirvana’s logo was also inspired by the happy face logo there, which said, "Have An Erotic Day!"

In 2006, the building's owner, a Seattle family, refused a multimillion-dollar tear-down offer from developers of a new Four Seasons Hotel next door. The owners instead received $850,000 "for air rights to the views over their property". Employees celebrated by posting on their reader board: "We're Open, Not Clothed!"

In January 2010, police arrested a peeping tom in the Lusty Lady who had climbed up from a viewing booth into the ceiling crawl space overhead, then partly crashed through the glass ceiling above the stage.

On April 11, 2010, the Lusty Lady in Seattle announced that it would close its doors for business in June 2010. The economic climate and the rise of Internet pornography were cited as reasons for closing. On June 28, 2010, the Lusty Lady marquee was removed from the Seattle location. It was acquired by the Museum of History & Industry and is now on display at their museum in the South Lake Union neighborhood.

In the wake of the Lusty Lady announcing its shutdown, the NPR program All Things Considered did a story focusing on the peep show's history and relationship to the broader downtown Seattle community.

In March 2023, Andrew Conru, founder of Friend Finder Networks, bought the Lusty Lady's building for $3 million, calling the purchase "a gift to the city". He intended to redevelop it into a hotel, a strip club, a restaurant, a museum, a retail store, or some other concern, soliciting ideas from the public. In June 2023, Conru's architect submitted plans to the city to raze the building. "Unfortunately for safety reasons it is a teardown. We looked at a seismic retrofit. It's just not going to happen," said Conru, who said that costs motivated his decision.

=== Books ===
The 1997 book The Lusty Lady by photographer Erika Langley documents the work in the Seattle branch of Lusty Lady. It includes photos by Langley (who had worked there as a dancer since 1992) as well as essays by a number of Lusty Lady dancers, who vary considerably in their attitudes toward their customers and toward their work. In 2000, some of the photos were exhibited in the Seattle Art Museum, across the street from the Lusty Lady.

Elisabeth Eaves, who had stripped at the Lusty Lady in 1997, completed graduate school and returned in 2000 to write a book about stripping in general and her experiences in particular, Bare: On Women, Dancing, Sex, and Power, published in 2002.

=== Popular culture references ===
The Seattle Lusty Lady was featured in the 1992 film American Heart. The first murder in the 1996 pilot of the TV series Millennium takes place in a Seattle peep show modeled on the Lusty Lady. Episode 18 (first aired 1997) of HBO's Real Sex series featured a visit to the Seattle Lusty Lady.

The theater show My Time With the Lady is a first-person account about working at the Lusty Lady by a long-time janitor and bouncer. It opened in Seattle in August 2010.

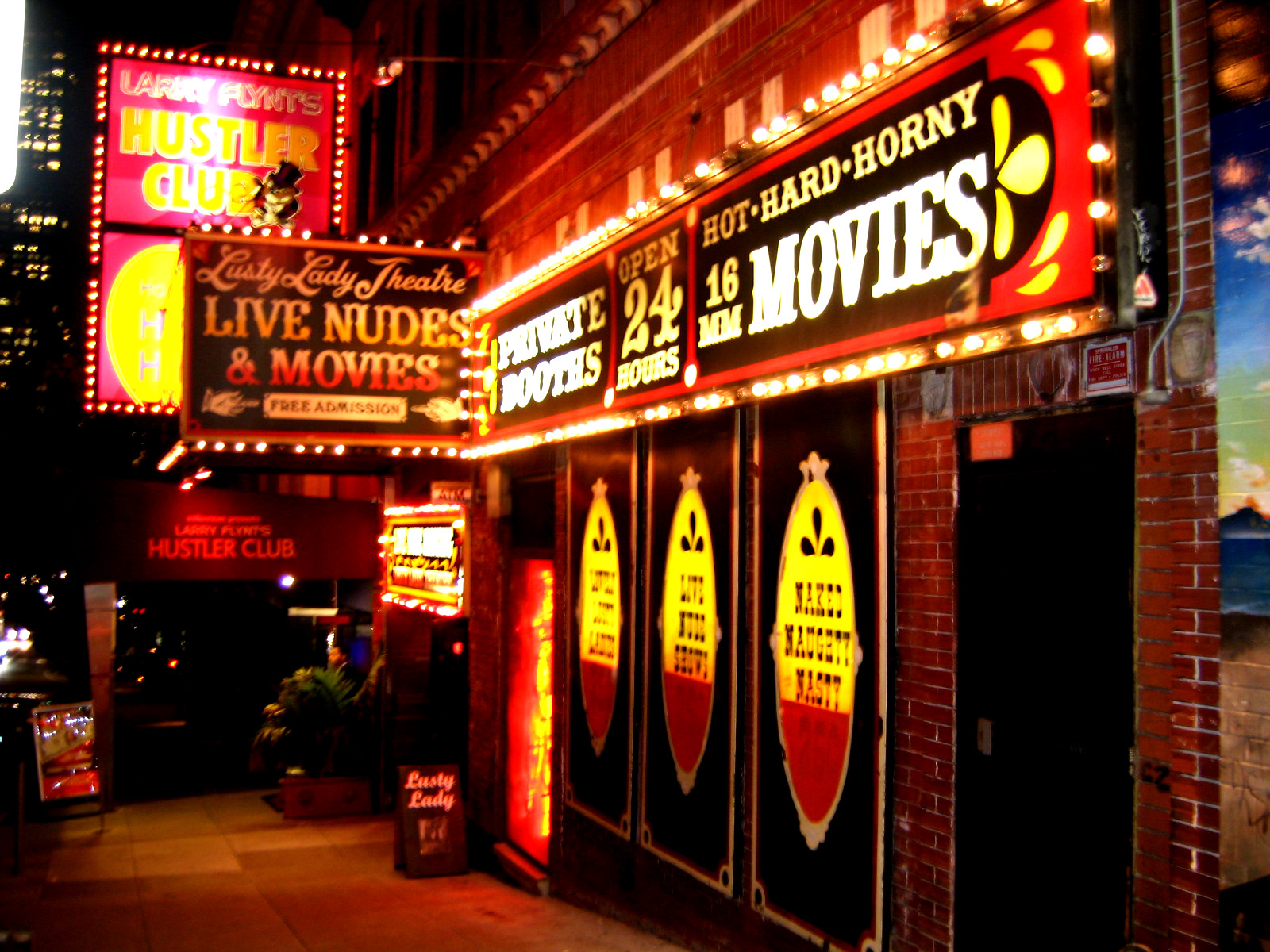
The Lusty Lady in San Francisco

== San Francisco ==
37°47′51″N 122°24′20″W

The San Francisco Lusty Lady was located at 1033 Kearny Street, in the Broadway strip club district of North Beach. It was open 24 hours a day, though the live stage was closed between 3 and 11 am.

=== Unionization ===
Several grievances led to the unionizing effort in 1997. African American feminist sociologist Siobhan Brooks while working at the club had noticed that African American dancers were discriminated against and filed a complaint. The precipitating event was the installation of one-way mirrors in a number of booths (which also exist in the Seattle branch), resulting in some customers taking photos and videos of the show.

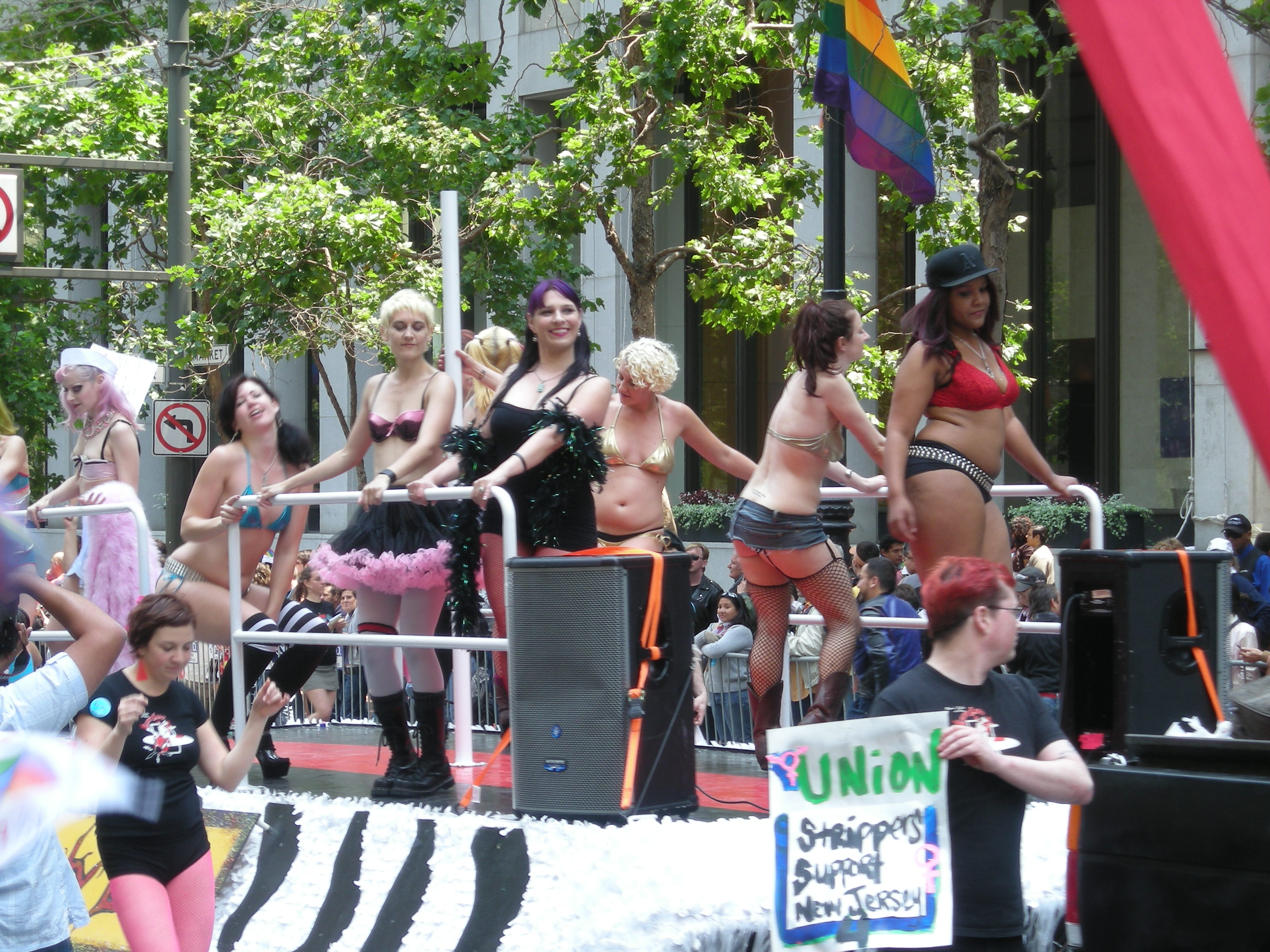
Float of the Lusty Lady at the 2008 San Francisco Pride parade

Among the leaders of the organizing drive was the stripper Julia Query who documented the efforts on video, resulting in the documentary Live Nude Girls Unite!, written and directed by Vicky Funari and Julia Query.

After a vote of the employees, the business was organized by the Exotic Dancers Union, an affiliate of Service Employees International Union, then a member of AFL–CIO, Local 790. The Bay Area Sex Worker Advocacy Network (BAYSWAN) provided website support for the workers' unionization effort, which helped to garner public support for the workers as well as inquiries from other exotic dancers and sex workers throughout the country.

Former Lusty Lady employee Siobhan Brooks commented in a 1997 article that "In some cases the media misquoted us as being the first strip club to unionize. But the first strip club to unionize was Pacers in San Diego. However, Pacers' union, Hotel Management, Employee Management, Local 30, negotiated an open clause in its contract. Open shop means there's no requirement that employees join the union, so the club recruited workers and discouraged them from joining the union and were able to decertify the union."

=== Worker cooperative ===
After management cut hourly compensation at the San Francisco Lusty Lady in 2003, the workers struck and won, but the closure of the peep show was announced soon after. The subsequent efforts to turn the club into a worker cooperative were led by Donna Delinqua (stage name), a stripper and graduate student in English. Other cooperatives provided input, among them the worker-owned San Francisco sex-toy business Good Vibrations.

The workers bought the club for $400,000, with money borrowed from the old owners. In 1996, the club had had a revenue of almost $3 million; by 2003 this had fallen by 40%. The monthly rent was $13,442 in 2003 and had doubled over the preceding three years. The club had a revenue of about $27,000 per week in the first half of 2006.

After the change in ownership, the union was retained, but some changes in management were instituted. While dancers had been regularly evaluated by managers before, now a peer review process was established wherein dancers evaluate each other. The team leaders are elected from among the dancers for six-month terms.

A dispute began in the summer of 2006 when a male employee wrote a confidential email to the co-op board, reporting customer complaints about a show featuring heavy women. Another member of the board, a dancer, posted a printout of the message in the club dressing room, causing considerable consternation among dancers. Both board members were suspended. Two of the male employees have argued that the union should be abandoned as not useful in a worker-owned cooperative. On its website, the Lusty Lady describes a worker-owned business as "a rare and ideal situation" but "not without its challenges" and discusses how the workers address these challenges.

On August 20, 2013, the Lusty Lady in San Francisco announced that it would close its doors for business in just two weeks, on September 2. The landlord, Roger Forbes (part of Deja Vu Consulting Inc. which by that time owned almost every strip club in San Francisco with the exception of Crazy Horse, Mitchell Brothers O’Farrell Theatre, and Nob Hill) refused to renew the lease after attempts to re-negotiate the rent had failed.

=== Books ===
Lily Burana, who worked as a stripper for a time at the San Francisco Lusty Lady, wrote about her experiences there and in other strip clubs in her 2001 book Strip City: A Stripper's Farewell Journey Across America. Carol Queen also wrote about her time dancing at the Lusty Lady, in her 2003 book Real Live Nude Girl: Chronicles of a Sex-Positive Culture. Bernadette Barton interviewed dancers at the Lusty Lady in her 2006 book Stripped: Inside the Lives of Exotic Dancers. Jennifer Worley worked at the Lusty Lady as a graduate student and participated in the unionization of the venue and its later transformation into a worker co-op later wrote about her experiences in her 2020 memoir Neon Girls: A Stripper's Education in Protest and Power.

== See also ==
- List of strip clubs
- Regal Show World
- Siouxsie Q
