= Eves =

Eves is an English matronymic surname from Eve. Notable people with the surname include:

- Archie Eves (1876–1958), American football coach
- Braden Eves (born 1999), American racing driver
- Bruce Eves (born 1952), Canadian artist
- C. Washington Eves (1838–1899), Merchant in the UK-West Indies trade
- Chris Eves (born 1987), New Zealand rugby union player
- Christopher Eves, British inventor
- Derral Eves (born 1974), American online personality and advertiser
- Ernie Eves (born 1946), 23rd Premier of Ontario
- Florence Eves (died 1911), English physiologist
- Howard Eves (1911–2004), American mathematician
- John Eves (1922–2007), English footballer
- Luke Eves (born 1989), English rugby union player
- Lynn Eves (1942–2023), Canadian sprinter
- Mark Eves (born 1977), American politician
- Mel Eves (born 1956), English footballer
- Reg Eves (1892–1972), British cartoonist
- Reginald Eves (1876–1941), British artist
- Steve Eves (21st century), American rocket scientist
- William Eves (1867–1950), British architect

== See also ==
- Eaves (disambiguation)
  - Eaves (surname)
- Eve (disambiguation)
  - Eve (surname)
