= Eaves (surname) =

Eaves is an English surname. Notable people with the name include:

- Allen C Eaves (born 1941), Canadian medical researcher
- Ben Eaves (born 1982), American ice hockey player
- Ben Eaves (basketball) (born 1987), British basketball player
- Benjamin Franklin Eaves (1870–1953), American horse and buggy doctor
- Bob Eaves, American businessman and civic leader
- Charles Eaves (1908–2006), Canadian scientist
- Connie Eaves (born 1944), Canadian medical researcher
- Dan Eaves (born 1975), British auto racing driver
- Dashiell Eaves (born 1974), American actor
- Elisabeth Eaves Canadian author and journalist
- Elsie Eaves (1898–1983), first female associate member of the American Society of Civil Engineers
- Gerald R. Eaves (born 1939), California State Assemblyman
- Hubert Eaves III, American keyboardist, songwriter and record producer
- Ian Eaves, British researcher and consultant on arms and armour
- Jerry Eaves (born 1959), American college basketball coach
- Joel Eaves (1914–1991), American college football and basketball player and coach
- John Eaves (born 1962) designer and illustrator
- John Arthur Eaves Jr. (born 1966), American attorney and politician
- Laurence Eaves (born 1948), British physicist and professor
- Les Eaves (born 1967), American businessman and politician from Arkansas
- Lindon Eaves (1944–2022), behavior geneticist
- Mark Eaves (born 1961), Australian rules footballer
- Max Eaves (born 1988), English pole vaulter
- Mike Eaves (born 1956), Canadian-American ice hockey player and coach
- Murray Eaves (born 1960), Canadian ice hockey player
- Patrick Eaves (born 1984), Canadian-American ice hockey forward
- Steve Eaves (born 1952), Welsh poet, songwriter and singer
- Tom Eaves (born 1992), English footballer
- Vallie Eaves (1911–1960), American baseball pitcher
- Wilberforce Eaves (1867–1920), British tennis player

== See also ==
- Eaves (disambiguation)
- Eves, surname
- Gary Eave, baseball player
