= Siobhan Brooks =

African-American sociologist (born 1972)

- Born: 1972 (age 53–54)

Academic background
- Education: San Francisco State University (BA); New School University (PhD)

Academic work
- Discipline: Sociology
- Institutions: California State University, Fullerton

Siobhan Brooks (born 1972) is an African-American lesbian feminist sociologist known for her work with African-American women sex workers. She holds a Bachelor of Arts in women's studies from San Francisco State University, and a Doctor of Philosophy in sociology from New School University in New York City. She is currently Professor of African-American studies at California State University, Fullerton.

== Lusty Lady labor organizing ==
While a student at SFSU, Brooks worked at the Lusty Lady peep-show in San Francisco's North Beach neighborhood. She observed that the club hired very few black women, and that they were restricted from working in the "private booth" section of the theater, where dancers have the opportunity to make more money. After raising her concerns to the club's manager, Brooks was reprimanded and told that "black women make the club lose money." Brooks worked with the Service Employees International Union (SEIU), Local 790, to file a racial discrimination complaint with the Equal Employment Opportunity Commission. Her efforts proved successful: the club hired more black women than ever before in its fourteen-year history.

The story of the unionizing efforts at the Lusty Lady are chronicled in Live Nude Girls UNITE!, a documentary by Julia Query. Brooks is featured in the film. Brooks also wrote Organizing From Behind the Glass, an account of the successful unionizing effort, for the January 1997 issue of Z Magazine. In the article, Brooks stated that at the Lusty Lady, where she had worked, "the only Black show director, Josephine, informed me that Black dancers have always done poorly in the booth, it was just a reality of the business, but she provided no evidence of this."

== Research on sex work ==
Brooks has gone on to interview sex workers across the country and has published several articles as a result. Her work has appeared in the anthology Whores and Other Feminists (ed. Jill Nagle, Routledge 1998), Z Magazine, Feminism and Anti-Racism (eds. France Winddance Twine and Kathleen Blee, 2000), Revolutionary Voices (ed. Amy Sonnie), and she interviewed Angela Y. Davis about her views on race, gender, and the sex industry in the post-Civil Rights era for the University of California Hastings Law Journal (Winter 1999). She also appeared on the cover of ColorLines magazine in the winter 2004 issue, "Sex, Race, Gender." Brooks is the author of the book Unequal Desires: Race and Erotic Capital in the Stripping Industry (SUNY Press, 2010).

== Other research and advocacy ==
While known as a sex worker activist, Brooks' research and advocacy expands to broader topics of gender and institutions, women of color and mental illness, queer race identities, women in the media, race and class. In October 2005 Brooks co-organized a conference on hip hop music's global impact at Lehman College, where she was an adjunct professor in the department of sociology. Brooks' second book, Everyday Violence against Black and Latinx LGBT Communities (Lexington Books, 2020), focuses on violence and resistance within Black and Latinx LGBT communities.
