= Erika Langley =

American photojournalist and writer

Erika Langley (born 1967) is an American photojournalist and writer.

== Early life and education ==
Born in Arlington, Virginia in 1967, she has been based in Seattle, Washington since 1992. She worked from 1992 to 2004 as dancer at the Lusty Lady, a peep show in Seattle. Langley is a graduate of the Rhode Island School of Design.

== Work ==
Her 1997 book, The Lusty Lady: Photographs and Texts combined memoir, photographs, and sections about several of her co-workers there. She originally became interested in the Lusty Lady in terms of photographing dancers, but was informed by management that the only way she would have access to do that was if she danced there herself. She ended up working there for twelve years. The photos she took there resulted in her book The Lusty Lady and in several art exhibits including one in 1994 that an administrator of the King County Arts Commission Gallery described at the time as that gallery's "most potentially controversial exhibit." Her work was given an entire wall of the 1999–2000 Seattle Art Museum exhibit "Hereabouts: Northwest Pictures by Seven Photographers," after the same museum had canceled a 1998 exhibit at almost the last minute.

More recently, Langley has been documenting the erosion of Washaway Beach at North Cove just south of Grayland, Washington, one of the fastest eroding places in the Western Hemisphere.

Her work is included in the collection of the Seattle Art Museum.
