= Carol Leigh =

American artist and activist (1951–2022)

- Born: January 11, 1951; New York City, U.S.
- Died: November 16, 2022 (aged 71); San Francisco, California, U.S.
- Other name: The Scarlot Harlot
- Education: Binghamton University; Empire State College; Boston University
- Occupations: Artist; author; filmmaker; sex worker; sex workers' rights activist
- Known for: Coined the term "sex work"; Founder of San Francisco Sex Worker Film and Arts Festival; Director and co-founder of BAYSWAN (Bay Area Sex Worker Advocacy Network)
- Website: scarlotharlot.com

Carol Leigh (January 11, 1951 – November 16, 2022), also known as The Scarlot Harlot, was an American artist, author, filmmaker, sex worker, and sex workers' rights activist. She is credited with coining the term sex work and founded the Sex Worker Film and Arts Festival and was the co-founder of BAYSWAN, the Bay Area Sex Worker Advocacy Network.

== Early life and education ==
Leigh was born on January 11, 1951, in New York City and grew up in Jackson Heights, Queens. She was a red diaper baby, and her family was Jewish. She later attended Binghamton University (1968–70) and Empire State College (1972–74), where she obtained a BA in creative writing. She also attended the Boston University MFA program for creative writing.

By 1978, Leigh moved to San Francisco and began sex work. Two years later she was raped by two men at the establishment where she worked. She did not report this to the police for fear of the establishment being shut down. Leigh later described the rape as a defining moment in her life that prompted her activism for sex workers' rights.

== Activism ==
After moving to San Francisco, Leigh joined COYOTE, a sex workers' rights organization, and became involved in its activities, including as a spokesperson, and through the Coalition on Prostitution coordinated a street outreach project for street workers in San Francisco. She also co-founded BAYSWAN, the Bay Area Sex Worker Advocacy Network, in 1990, and was an original member of ACT UP. According to former ACT UP member Terry Beswick, "Carol was the fairy godmother of the early AIDS direct action groups of San Francisco. She was a character, always injecting an element of over-the-top satire into our protests and deliberations, with a devilish grin and a wink in her eye. Her sex-positive safer sex messages were way ahead of their time and were a blast of fun amidst all the doom and gloom."

In San Francisco, Leigh also joined the AIDS activist organization Citizens For Medical Justice and collaborated with the Sisters of Perpetual Indulgence. In the 1990s, she was part of a San Francisco Board of Supervisors commission on prostitution. She was one of the main contributors to the San Francisco Task Force on Prostitution, whose report calling for the decriminalization of prostitution was published in 1996.

In 2006 Leigh received a grant from the Creative Work Fund to establish, in collaboration with the Center for Sex & Culture, the Sex Worker Media Library. In 2008, she prominently advocated for a San Francisco ballot initiative to decriminalize prostitution.

=== The term "sex work" ===
Leigh is credited with coining the term sex work at an anti-pornography conference in the late 1970s or early 1980s. The terminology used at the Women Against Violence in Pornography and Media conference for the sex industry was the "Sex Use Industry". The phrasing bothered her because it objectified sex workers and trivialized the agency they had in the transaction. She suggested the panel be renamed "Sex Work Industry" (later writing "because that described what women did") and began to use the term in her one-woman plays before the first published use of sex worker appeared in a 1984 Associated Press newswire. She explained in a 1997 essay titled "Inventing Sex Work" that: "I invented sex work. Not the activity, of course. The term. This invention was motivated by my desire to reconcile my feminist goals with the reality of my life and the lives of the women I knew. I wanted to create an atmosphere of tolerance within and outside the women's movement for women working in the sex industry."

== Theater, television, and film ==
In the early 1980s, Leigh wrote her one-woman satirical play The Adventures of Scarlot Harlot. She performed in San Francisco and at the 1983 National Festival of Women's Theater in Santa Cruz. Her onstage persona was the "Scarlot Harlot", and she regularly performed at clubs and theaters, including the Great American Music Hall and the Holy City Zoo, as well as rallies and as part of the Sex Workers Art Show tour and the Sex Worker Arts Festival in Tucson, Arizona in 2001 and 2002.

Leigh began making videos in 1985, and received awards from the American Film Institute for Yes Means Yes, No Means No; Outlaw Poverty, Not Prostitutes and Mother's Mink. Other films she directed and produced include the documentary Blind Eye to Justice: HIV+ Women in California Prisons, narrated by Angela Davis.

During the AIDS crisis in the United States, Leigh decided to leave San Francisco and move to Texas where she intended to form an educational organization to promote safe sex: T.W.A.T. ("Texas Whores And Tricks"). Her car broke down in Tucson, Arizona, and she answered a classified ad from media-life-artist Dennis Williams, who had a weekly two-hour live comedy program on Tucson Western International Television (T.W.I.T.). Leigh joined the show and created and developed several characters for it. After two years Leigh returned to San Francisco.

The San Francisco Sex Worker Film and Arts Festival was founded by Leigh in 1999, which she also co-produced with Erica Elena Berman and Jovelyn Richards.

== Personal life and death ==
Leigh lived in San Francisco and was bisexual. She died of cancer on November 16, 2022, at age 71.

Her papers, videos and films are archived at the Schlesinger Library on the History of Women in America at Harvard University.

== Works ==
=== Books ===
- Leigh, Carol (2004). Unrepentant Whore: The Collected Writings of Scarlot Harlot. San Francisco: Last Gasp. ISBN 9780867195842.

=== Book chapter ===
- Leigh, Carol (2010). "Inventing Sex Work". In Nagle, Jill (ed.). Whores and Other Feminists. Routledge. ISBN 9780203700655.

=== Film appearances ===
As listed by WorldCat.

- The Celluloid Bordello aka Whores on Film (2019) [21]
- Annie Sprinkle's amazing world of orgasm (2004)
- Annie Sprinkle's Herstory of porn : reel to real
- Dr. Annie Sprinkle's How to be a sex goddess in 101 easy steps (1992)
- Mutantes : féminisme porno punk = Punk porn feminism (2011) (in French)
- Mutantes : punk porn feminism (2011)
- Our bodies, our minds (2005)
- Released : 5 short videos about women and prison (2001)
- Sphinxes without secrets : women performance artists speak out (1991)
- Straight for the money : interviews with queer sex workers (1994)

=== Videos produced ===
As listed by Western Connecticut State University.

- Die Yuppie Scum (1989) 30 min
- Outlaw Poverty, Not Prostitutes (1989) 21 min
- Safe Sex Slut (1987) 30 min
- Spiritual Warfare: The G.H.O.S.T.* Campaign (1990) 28 min
- Taking Back the Night (1990) 28 min
- Whores and Healers (1990) 28 min
- Yes Means Yes, No Means No (1990) 8 min
- Whore in the Gulf (1991) 30 min

== See also ==
- AIDS Coalition to Unleash Power

== Sources ==
- Juhasz, Alexandra (2001). Women of Vision: Histories in Feminist Film and Video. Visible Evidence 9. U of Minnesota Press. ISBN 9781452904252.
- Leigh, Carol (2004). Unrepentant Whore: The Collected Writings of Scarlot Harlot. San Francisco: Last Gasp. ISBN 9780867195842.
- Nagle, Jill, ed. (1997). Whores and Other Feminists. Psychology Press. ISBN 9780415918220.
