= Robert Bartley =

American conservative editorial columnist

Robert Leroy Bartley (October 12, 1937 – December 10, 2003) was the editor of the editorial page of The Wall Street Journal for more than 30 years. He won a Pulitzer Prize for opinion writing and received the Presidential Medal of Freedom from the Bush administration in 2003. Bartley, a graduate of Iowa State University, was famed for providing a conservative interpretation of the news every day, especially regarding economic issues. The Forbes Media Guide Five Hundred, 1994 states:

According to Forbes tabloid, editor Bartley's influence stems largely from his intelligent, fearless editorship of the Journal's editorial and op-ed pages. Robert L. Bartley Fellowships are named in his honor.

== Personal ==
Bartley was the son of a professor of veterinary medicine. He was born in Marshall, Minnesota and grew up in Ames, Iowa. Bartley received a bachelor's degree in journalism from Iowa State University and a master's degree in political science from the University of Wisconsin–Madison. His wife Edith had three daughters with him.

== Professional ==
Bartley started at the Journal in 1962. After working as a staff reporter in the Chicago and Philadelphia bureaus, he became part of the editorial page staff in 1964. In 1972, he became editor of the editorial page, and in 1979 the editor of the Journal. He earned the 1979 Gerald Loeb Award for Columns/Editorial. In 1980, he won the Pulitzer Prize for editorial writing. In 1982, John Tebbel, professor emeritus of journalism at New York University, called Bartley "the most influential editorial writer of my time."

External videos
- Life and Career of Robert Bartley interview, January 15, 1988, C-SPAN
- Booknotes interview with Bartley on The Seven Fat Years and How to Do It Again, May 17, 1992, C-SPAN

In 1983, Bartley was named a vice president of Dow Jones & Company, owner of The Wall Street Journal.

Bartley was the author of "The Seven Fat Years: And How to Do It Again," published in 1992, a book on the economic policy of the Reagan administration.

In December 2002, Bartley stepped down as editor of the Wall Street Journal editorial page. In December 2003, a week before Bartley died of cancer, President George W. Bush announced that Bartley was being awarded the Presidential Medal of Freedom, America's highest civilian honor.

On the free market, he said "In general, 'the market' is smarter than the smartest of its individual participants."

A supporter of NAFTA, Bartley is said to have observed to a former colleague, Peter Brimelow, "I think the nation-state is finished." Alongside his support for the free flow of goods, Bartley supported the free flow of labour across borders. He controversially wrote in favor of open borders and high rates of immigration to the United States. After then Mexican President, Vicente Fox, declared in a speech in 2001 that "NAFTA should evolve into something like the European Union, with open borders for not only goods and investment but also people", Bartley wrote in support of having open borders between Mexico and the United States. Indeed, in that July 2, 2001 Wall Street Journal editorial, Bartley reminded readers that "during the immigration debate of 1984 we suggested an ultimate goal to guide passing policies--a constitutional amendment: 'There shall be open borders.'"

== Bartley Fellowship ==
Robert L. Bartley Fellowships, named in honor of Bartley, are paid internships of one to six months at Wall Street Journal offices in the U.S., Europe, or Asia. Fellows assist in researching and writing editorials, editing op-ed articles, editing "Leisure & Arts" page features, and editing letters to the editor for the Journal and its website. Bartley Fellows have included Sohrab Ahmari, Elisabeth Eaves, Joseph Malchow, Joseph Rago, Mira Sethi and Bari Weiss.
