= Adult FriendFinder =

Internet-based social networking service

- Website type: Online dating service Social networking service Adult dating website
- Available in: English, Spanish, French, German, Japanese, Chinese, Portuguese, Tagalog, Italian
- Commercial: Yes
- Registration: Yes
- Current status: Active

Adult FriendFinder (AFF) is an internet-based, adult-oriented social networking service, online dating service and swinger personals community website, founded by Andrew Conru in 1996.

In 2007 AFF was one of the 100 most popular sites in the United States; its competitors include sites such as Match.com.

== History ==
In 1993, Andrew Conru created the first online dating site, WebPersonals. After selling that site in 1995, he launched FriendFinder.com, an early social networking site, in 1996. Days after the site went live, Conru found that people were posting naked pictures of themselves and seeking partners for adult-oriented activities. As a result, Conru started Adult FriendFinder, which he described as "a release valve". FriendFinder has since established other niche dating sites, including Senior FriendFinder, Amigos.com, BigChurch.com, and Alt.com. The former three have since closed down, leaving only Alt.com active to this day.

The parent company (Various, Inc.) had difficulty finding venture capital due to the adult nature of its business. In December 2007, the company was sold to the Penthouse Media Group for $500 million. Penthouse later changed its name to FriendFinder Networks. In October 2009, as part of an arrangement with The Kluger Agency, musician Flo Rida released a music video for his song "Touch Me" via Adult FriendFinder. A representative of the agency stated that it was "always great to combine a very sexy high octane record with a very sexy brand.

On September 17, 2013, parent company FriendFinder Networks filed for Chapter 11 bankruptcy protection. In December 2013, FriendFinder Networks emerged from bankruptcy protection with reorganization in effect. Founder Andrew Conru gained control of the company and is CEO.

== Overview ==
Accessing certain features, such as e-mail, private chat rooms, webcams, blogging, and a webzine, requires paid membership. Adult FriendFinder has an affiliate program, whereby webmasters are compensated for referring users to the site.

== Criticism ==
Adult FriendFinder has been accused of committing systematic billing fraud. According to the complaints filed, the company has a practice of continuing to bill customers even after they have cancelled their service. Former employees of the company have claimed that this is their standard policy and not the result of errors. These employees have stated that the majority of customers do not notice the charges for many months. As of October 2014, hundreds of civil cases have been filed against the company and a criminal indictment was made by the Federal Trade Commission against the company. In 2007, Adult FriendFinder settled with the Federal Trade Commission over allegations that the company had used malware to generate explicit pop-up ads for the service on computers without user consent.

Adult FriendFinder's acquisition by Penthouse was the subject of a 2007 lawsuit by Broadstream Capital Partners, a merchant bank that assists with mergers, alleging Penthouse breached a 2006 contract by purchasing the company without obtaining Broadstream's consent, a claim Penthouse denies. The suit was settled for $15 million in 2011.

== Security breaches ==
In May 2015, Adult FriendFinder was hacked by users associated with the Hell forums, with the hackers stealing personal information about as many as four million of the site's users.

On November 13, 2016, it was reported that a database of usernames, e-mails, and passwords had been breached and leaked from Adult FriendFinder and other FriendFinder Networks websites. The breach included 300 million Adult FriendFinder user accounts, including account data for 15 million accounts that had supposedly been "deleted". The passwords had either been stored in plain text, or hashed without a salt with the obsolete and insecure SHA-1 hashing algorithm.

== Awards ==
The site won the 2010 XBIZ Award for "Dating Program of the Year". In 2022 the site won the XBIZ Award for "Dating Company of the Year".

== See also ==
- Comparison of online dating websites
