= Maquilapolis =

- Directed by: Vicky Funari, Sergio De La Torre
- Produced by: Vicky Funari, Sergio de la Torre
- Cinematography: Daniel Gorrell, Sophie Constantinou
- Edited by: Vicky Funari
- Distributed by: California Newsreel
- Release date: 2006
- Running time: 68 minutes
- Countries: Mexico; United States
- Languages: Spanish; English

Maquilapolis (from Spanish: Maquiladora, referring to the manufacturing operations in a free trade zone, and Greek: πόλις, meaning city) is a 2006 documentary film by Vicky Funari and Sergio De La Torre. It filmed in Tijuana, Baja California and focuses on the factories on the U.S.-Mexican border. The film was made in collaboration with its subjects. Funari and De La Torre established workshops for the woman to learn how to use video equipment to tell their own stories.

== Synopsis ==
The film tells the story of women who live in Tijuana and what their lives are like working in the nearby factory. Carmen Duran, a single mother of three, was denied a severance payment that is legally required. The film also focuses on another protagonist who discusses the environmental damage the factories have done to her town and how things have changed since she was a child, such as the river no longer being safe to play in.

The women had to endure poor working conditions that impacted themselves and their neighborhoods. The poor conditions include smelling like burned plastic when they leave the factories, being harassed by employers, not being allowed to drink or use the bathroom (leading to kidney problems), not being given severance when the company decided to leave, and chemicals polluting their neighborhoods (leading to health complications such as difficulty breathing, skin rashes, and hives), among other issues.

== Themes ==
One of the main themes of the documentary is how the assembly plant industry takes advantage of its employees and denying them basic human rights. Young women are preferred for these factory jobs because they have little experience in politics and labor unions. The film makes a statement about globalism and the cost of workers' lives balanced against cheap costs of production.

== Directors ==
Vicky Funari and Sergio de la Torre are both interested in the agency of these women. To make this more evident, they trained the women in the film to use the cameras and involved them in every step of production. When talking about this decision, Funari had this to say:

Within lefty and liberal progressive filmmaking there’s all this language about "giving people voice" and "empowerment," but I don’t like those ways of talking because . . . they don’t question the very real power dynamic that exists between the filmmaker and the subject. You can’t remove the power dynamic, because somebody is going to raise the money, somebody is going to have the camera and somebody is going to make the decision to make the film. . . . So I think we’re trying to find ways to create a collaboration that acknowledges that this dynamic is present and works with it. I want my films to embody the power of taking and finding voice, not the power of bestowing it.

In an interview with Rosa-Linda Fregoso, Funari also notes that many of the women in these factories are often portrayed as victims, but she believes that they should be portrayed as survivors. Additionally, De la Torre thinks these women are heroes because of how they continue to work to benefit themselves and their community, despite the adverse conditions they face.

Additionally, Funari notes the goal of the documentary: "I was interested in women who were aware of their own agency. Everybody has agency, but not every- one is able to talk about it and express what that agency means to them." Basically, these women are working to improve the global economy and change the way it operates. Funari wanted to be a part of questioning this global economy, bringing on change, and telling the stories of the women working on the front line for these changes.
