= Luke Booth =

British designer

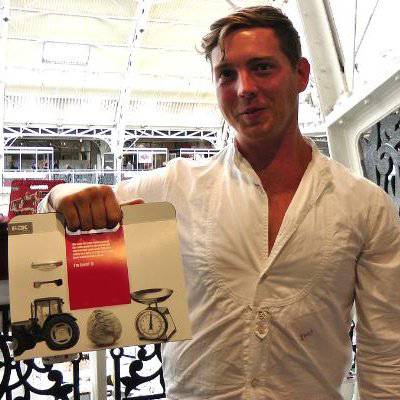
Luke Booth at Packaging Innovation show London 2011

Luke Booth is a product designer and inventor. Booth, and his uncle Christopher Eves, successfully participated in the BBC television show, Dragons' Den and received investment to launch their packaging solutions for the FMCG, retail and leisure markets.

== Background ==
Booth studied Product Design at the Central Saint Martins (CSM) in London. He won a Starpack Gold star for the BevBax food and drink carrier that rips open into a tray. In 2011 Booth set up P4CK with Eves.

== Dragons Den ==
Co-founders of P4CK, Booth and Eves appeared on BBC's Dragons' Den Episode 11 Series 10.

The pair faced a grilling by the Dragons and originally pitched for £50,000 funding for 10% equity. Theo Paphitis liked the idea and said that he was willing to back the idea, giving Booth and Eves £50,000 for 30% equity in their business.

== Products ==
Flexicarry- Food carrier, supplied flat. Internationally patented; uses 40% less raw material than a card carrier and balances with 1, 2, 3 or 4 pints. Health and safety accredited for stadia.

BevBax- Carry food and drink in one hand.

Bax- retail packaging employing cardboard sleeve and bag, reducing packaging weight, High visibility shelf presence, Can be used where foil wrap or vacuum pack are required.

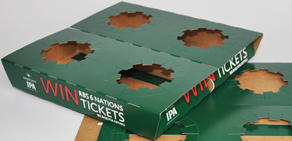
Carrybar

Carrybar- P4CK launched its new drinks carrier, the CarryBar, at the Twickenham stadium on Saturday 17 November, at the QBE Internationals; England v. Australia match. Can carry four pints of beer. Some 100,000 carriers were produced by Benson Group with Guinness and Greene King IPA branding. The Carrybar employs a central bar mechanism, and uses 33% less material than a comparable product.

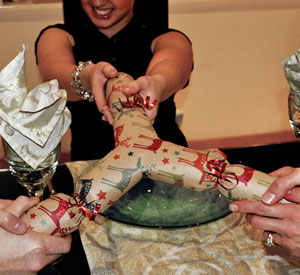
A 3-sided Christmas cracker.

3-Sided Christmas cracker
