= Joyce Wallace =

American AIDS physician (1940–2020)

Joyce Wallace (November 25, 1940 – October 14, 2020) was a pioneering AIDS physician. She was among the first to identify AIDS in the 1980s and worked to stop its spread among New York City's prostitutes.

She was among the first doctors to find Kaposi's sarcoma in immunodeficient gay men before AIDS was diagnosed in 1981. She also published a paper in 1981 that linked Kaposi's sarcoma with AIDS.

== Early life ==
Joyce Irene Malakoff (birth name) was born in Philadelphia but grew up in Queens. Her father, Samuel Malakoff, was a teacher at a vocational high school while her mother, Henrietta Yetta (Hameroff) Malakoff, was a speech therapist.

Wallace graduated from Queens College in 1961 with a degree in history, then studied pre-med at Columbia University's School of General Studies. Wallace completed her medical degree from the State University of New York Health Science Center in Brooklyn in 1968.

== Career ==
Wallace started the Foundation for Research on Sexually Transmitted Diseases in 1982 and served as its president and then executive and medical director until 2003. Wallace worked at the Mount Sinai School of Medicine, New York Medical College and the State University of New York at Stony Brook.

She was one of several co-authors of a report entitled "Kaposi's Sarcoma and Pneumocystis Pneumonia Among Homosexual Men — New York City and California", published on July 3, 1981 in the Centers for Disease Control's Morbidity and Mortality Weekly Report. This was once of the first reports linked Kaposi's Sarcoma to immunodeficient gay men, and thus one of the first medical reports of the looming AIDS crisis.

Wallace received the Brooke Russell Astor Award for improving the quality of life in New York City.

== Personal life ==
Wallace was the mother of documentarian Julia Query, and a confrontation between the two women was included in Query's 2000 work Live Nude Girls Unite!.

Wallace died from a heart attack in a Manhattan, New York City hospital in October 2020.
