= BAYSWAN =

Sex Worker Advocacy Network

- Type: Nonprofit
- Purpose: Sex worker worker organization
- Location: San Francisco Bay Area, United States
- Official language: English
- Website: bayswan.org

Bay Area Sex Worker Advocacy Network (BAYSWAN) is a non-profit organization in the San Francisco Bay Area which works to improve working conditions, increase benefits, and eliminate discrimination on behalf of individuals working within both legal and criminalized adult entertainment industries. The organization provides advice and information to social service, policy reformers, media outlets, politicians, including the San Francisco Task Force on Prostitution and the United States Commission on the Status of Women (COSW), and law enforcement agencies dealing with sex workers.

== Origins ==
BAYSWAN was founded as a collaborative project sponsored by the San Francisco-area Exotic Dancers Alliance and the Coalition on Prostitution and Street Outreach Services Consortium, which included the Asian AIDS Project, the Haight Ashbury Free Clinics, Inc., the Institute for Community Health Outreach, New Leaf Community Services, Proyecto ContraSIDA por Vida, and Tenderloin AIDS Resource Center. Its purpose at founding was to create a network of social service organizations, service providers, and community members to advocate on behalf of sex workers, massage parlor employees, escorts, exotic dancers, and other sex industry workers to protect their civil, human, and workplace rights as well as to improve communication between sex industry workers and government agencies, social service providers, and other organizations throughout the Bay Area. BAYSWAN's efforts encompassed the financial, housing, social support, mental health, and medical needs of sex industry workers, including HIV/STD prevention, substance abuse issues, harm reduction, and protection from violence.

== Activities ==
BAYSWAN's principal work is to make available resources provided by sex workers' and other human rights-based organizations about the rights of sex workers and others employed in the adult entertainment and sex industries, including prostitution and exotic dancing. Information is provided through the organization's website and through the media as a source for stories or opinion pieces relating to sex workers and sex industries. Bayswan also works to improve working conditions and to eliminate discrimination against workers within both the legal and criminalized adult entertainment industries, and organizes sex worker rights advocates who work at various agencies as outreach workers.

BAYSWAN sponsors the Prostitutes' Education Network (PENet), an educational website on sex workers' rights and issues. and works to educate the general public about sex work, and promotes education about safe sex, AIDS and sexually transmitted disease amongst sex workers, their clients, and the general public, including organizing events and sponsoring conferences such as the San Francisco Sex Worker Film and Arts Festival.

=== Prostitutes' Education Network ===
BAYSWAN sponsors the Prostitutes' Education Network (PENet), an educational website on sex workers' rights and issues. PENet provides online access to studies and documents from U.S. and international sources and, as described in The Harvey Milk Institute Guide to Lesbian, Gay, Bisexual, Transgender, and Queer Internet Research, features "information and resources for sex workers, activists, educators, and students on issues such as decriminalization, human rights, violence, pornography, art, health, and current trends in legislation and social policy in the United states and internationally. It also includes a section on resources for students studying sex work and a listing of videos for educational purposes." According to BAYSWAN, PENet collects information from studies going back to the 1980s and works to accurately represent the current trends in prostitution and help influence human rights issues affecting prostitutes including human trafficking and exploitation against women and minors.

=== San Francisco Sex Worker Film and Arts Festival ===
Starting in 1999, BAYSWAN has been a sponsor and organizer of the San Francisco Sex Worker Film and Arts Festival at multiple locations, with activities including presentation of films by and about sex workers, live performances by sex worker artists, leather and latex sex toy bazaars, sex-related workshops and panels, and one year even a Good Vibrations-sponsored tutorial entitled "How to Make Your Own Porn Film."

=== Lusty Lady ===
In 1996 and 1997, BAYSWAN provided support to the workers at the Lusty Lady Theatre, a peep show in San Francisco, in their effort to persuade club management to remove the one-way mirrors in customer booths that allowed customers to clandestinely photograph and videotape dancers, the product of which they feared would begin appearing on the Internet or on bootleg videos without dancer permission or compensation. BAYSWAN provided website support for the efforts of the Exotic Dancers Alliance, which took part in the Lusty Lady unionization effort; the website in turn helped to garner public support for the workers as well as inquiries from other exotic dancers and sex workers throughout the country. The group ultimately approached Service Employees International Union Local 790, and in April 1997 Lusty Lady employees voted to unionize, forming the Exotic Dancers Union (EDU), the first sex workers organization of its kind. The union was still active at the venue, which became a worker-owned cooperative in 2003, until its closing on September 2, 2013.

=== St. James Infirmary ===
In 1998, together with Carol Stuart at COYOTE, BAYSWAN participated in laying the foundation for the St. James Infirmary Clinic the world's first occupational health and safety clinic run by sex workers with support from the San Francisco Department of Public Health (SFDPH). A jailed prostitute had her blood drawn without consent and to prevent a public outcry BAYSWAN and COYOTE brokered a deal with the SFDPH. Presenting Priscilla Alexander's paper on sex worker occupational health and safety they reached an agreement that the SFDPH would "have access to information about the occupational hazards and health status of sex industry workers but only if that research was developed by and with the input of sex industry workers themselves. There would be no more non-consensual blood draws in jail; sex workers would have the opportunity to run their own occupational health and safety clinic." "The St. James Infirmary is a peer-based Occupational Safety & Health Clinic for sex workers, and was founded in 1999 by COYOTE as a joint project between Exotic Dancers Alliance (EDA) and the STD Prevention and Control Services of the City and County of San Francisco Department of Public Health. These partners shared common philosophies and worked to share services, resources, and expertise for the benefit of all sex workers." BAYSWAN's director, Carol Leigh, is a member of the advisory board.

== Addressing public issues affecting sex workers ==
=== San Francisco massage parlor arrests ===
In 2005 BAYSWAN addressed San Francisco District Attorney Kamala Harris for not following the 1989 San Francisco Board of Supervisors policy establishing San Francisco as a "city of refuge" and assisting California (state) and U.S. (federal) law enforcement agencies who re-victimized women caught in a cycle of exploitation in a series of massage parlor raids. In an op-ed essay Leigh pointed out previous police efforts and mistakes while educating about how mislabeling and forcing the women to either testify that they were prostitutes or illegal aliens. She stated, "Before we buy into the "sex slave" melodrama, we should consider the complexities of sex work, migration and trafficking. Framing the range of abuses in the sex industry as a moralistic concern about "sex slaves" obscures the real violations (and advantages) of this industry. Until we can begin to support rights for migrant workers and craft policies to support their needs to work, we are stuck in a quagmire that attracts, then rescues "innocent victims."

=== Proposed federal legislation to tax sex workers ===
Leigh, cofounder and director of BAYSWAN, who is also a bisexual feminist author and artist, criticized 2006 proposed legislation introduced by U.S. Senator Charles Grassley (R-Iowa) in the U.S. Senate Judiciary Committee as being shortsighted. She stated, "Forced labor (and) kidnapping should be targeted, but this legislation broadly targets the sex trade in general" (including legal businesses like escorts and strip clubs).

== See also ==
- Sexual slavery
