= Siouxsie Q =

American pornographic film actress and activist (born 1984/1985)

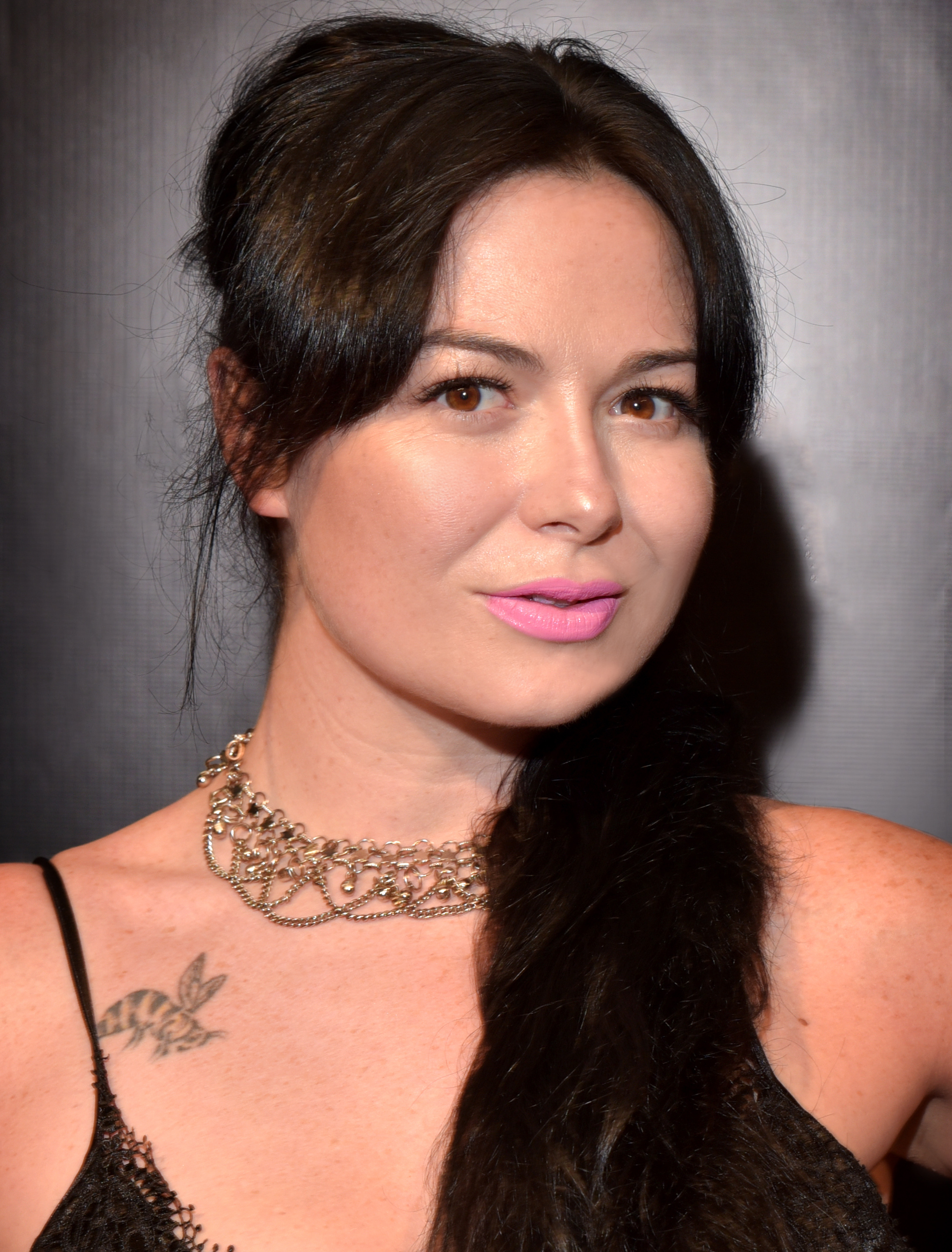
- Siouxsie Q in 2019
- Born: 1984 or 1985 (age 40–41)
- Occupations: Pornographic film actress; columnist; podcaster
- Spouse: Michael Vegas

Siouxsie Q (born 1984 or 1985)is an American journalist, pornographic film actress, and sex workers' rights activist who identifies herself as a feminist and sex worker. She is a podcaster, singer/songwriter and playwright as well as a widely read columnist with SF Weekly.

== Career ==
In 2010, Siouxsie Q quit her retail job and began dancing full-time at the Lusty Lady, a unionized peep show in San Francisco. Shortly after, she began her career as a sex worker while living in Inner Richmond, commuting to an apartment in the East Bay to conduct business.

Initially using the Internet primarily as a marketing tool, Siouxsie Q has stated that podcasts have "really transformed how I do business". By 2012, she had settled into her career and, at the urging of her boyfriend, began a regular, biweekly podcast as a way to speak out against California's Proposition 35 and Los Angeles' Measure B. Originally called, "This American Whore", the podcast's name was eventually changed to "The WhoreCast" after a dispute with This American Life, the public radio program. After the passing of Proposition 35, the podcast was expanded to cover a broad range of topics such as transgender issues, sexuality, sex workers' rights, politics and pornography.

In 2014, she began writing a regular column for SF Weekly in San Francisco in which she discusses the topics of pornography, feminism, sexuality and the sex work industry.

She was jointly nominated for Best All-Girl Group Sex Scene at the 2015 AVN Awards.

== Political views ==
By way of her podcast, "The WhoreCast", Siouxsie Q emerged as an outspoken opponent of Proposition 35, a part of the Californians Against Sexual Exploitation Act. In her broadcasts, she stated that she considered the proposition "a confusing piece of legislation" that too broadly expanded the definition of "trafficking" to include anyone who lived with or derived support from someone who is a prostitute. In response, The WhoreCast was established as "a vehicle to really humanize sex work" and as a way to oppose Proposition 35. She also utilized the podcast to speak out against Assembly Bill 1576, a bill that would require condoms be worn in all adult films made in California. She described the bill as "part of a multipronged strategy ... to shut down the porn industry in California". In 2013, she was featured on CNN after organizing an Obamacare registration drive dubbed the "Healthy Ho's Party." The event, designed to encourage sex workers to enroll in newly established insurance exchanges, was declared a success, with nearly 40 attendees filing enrollment paperwork.

== Personal life ==
Siouxsie Q was previously married to fellow podcaster and journalist Jesse James. As of 2024, she is married to American pornographic film actor and film director Michael Vegas. She has described herself as polyamorous.
