= Draketown, Georgia =

Unincorporated community in Georgia, U.S.

Coordinates: 33°49′34″N 85°02′39″W

Draketown is an unincorporated community in Haralson County, Georgia, United States. It was first settled by the Mound Builders. Around the 15th or 16th century, the indigenous Cherokee and Muscogee peoples replaced the Mound Builders and began their own society. Cherokee people mostly settled in the Draketown area.

== Geography ==
Draketown's elevation is 1,243 feet (379 m). It is located close to the Carroll and Paulding County lines. Haralson County is in the Eastern time zone (GMT -5).

== History ==
Draketown was founded by the Cherokee people, who called it "Long Leaf". The area was at that time referred to as the "Long Leaf Post Office." The name Long Leaf came from a long-leaf pine that grew in the area. It was next settled by men from the Ducktown Copper Mine who had found copper nearby. The men from Ducktown, Tennessee named the area Draketown because a drake is a male duck. In 1896, the population was reported to be 100. In 1907, the population was recorded as 300.

=== Tallapoosa (Waldrop) coppermine ===
The Tallapoosa (Waldrop) copper mine was settled by pioneers before Haralson County was established, from as early as 1857. It was located approximately 100 yards north of Coppermine Road, 600 yards east of the Tallapoosa River. The land of the mine, and three additional land plots, was bought by Thomas Greer Waldrop for $600.

"Copper excitement" started when Elijah Brooks was plowing on the western area of Long Leaf. As he was plowing, he discovered some bright yellow granular material that burned when set on fire, suggestive of copper. Brooks took it for further inspection in Villa Rica; a sample was sent to Tennessee. Immediately prospectors and promoters from Tennessee came to Haralson County. Work began on the copper mine and by 1874, a 48-foot vertical shaft was sunk by the Tennessee group.

Shortly after the shaft was in place, the rights to the mine were acquired by the Middle Georgia Mineral Association of Macon. Many surrounding land owners leased their mineral rights to the Mineral Association, who explored the land for about 18 months. Between 1880 and 1885, the property's mineral rights were held by William Tudor of Boston and Frederick L. Hart of Quebec, Canada. The two formed the Tallapoosa Mining Company.

The Tallapoosa Mining Company built a 235-foot incline to the bottom of the 48-foot shaft previously installed. The vein was approximately 150 feet and furnaces were built to extract the copper from the ground. 15,000 tons of ore were mined from the ground, but only 7,000 tons of ore was ever shipped. Most went to the Georgia Chemical Company of Atlanta, who paid $4 a ton. The ore was hauled from Draketown to Rockmart, 16 miles away, then shipped by the railroad to Atlanta. Copper operations stopped around 1885 but the land was prospected and explored continued around 1900 to 1905. In 1916, the Georgia Pyrite Company bought the Waldrop mine and some adjoining lots. The total area was around 397 acres.

From 1916 to 1917, the Arizona and Georgia Development Company leased the property. It was interested in the large amount of material that was milled and stored from 1881 to 1885. The material contained about 50 percent copper and around 50,000 pounds was collected and sold. Due to difficulties shipping the ore, the Tallapoosa (Waldrop) mine eventually came to a close.

=== Pioneers ===
==== Walter S. Butler ====
One of the first stories of the Draketown area involves a resident named Walter S. Butler. Butler had traded with the Cherokee people for years, and he eventually fell in love with and married a Cherokee woman. During the 1830s, the Cherokees were rounded up and forced to leave the area. They blindfolded Butler and took him on a long walk through the woods, crossing water several times. When the blindfold was removed, Butler was led through some underbrush to a cave. Inside the cave was a gold mine, with walls of shining yellow metal. Butler filled his pockets with gold nuggets from the floor of the mine. Unfortunately for Butler and his descendants, he was blindfolded again before leaving the mine. Many treasure hunters have looked for this cave, but none have been able to locate it.

There were a few strong and useful men among the early settlers who became identified with Haralson County. These men, realizing the advantages of having a county seat near their homes, influenced the General Assembly to pass an act creating the new county. A majority of the inhabitants of the county are probably descendants of these men: John Jackson Kirk, Captain W.J. Head; B.R. Walton; Martin Ayers; William Garner; Allen Philpot; C.C. Eaves; William Summerville; William J. Brown; Dr. William Gaulding; Dr. D.B. Head; John K. Holcombe Jr.; Seaborn Goldin; Dr. W.F. Goldin; A.J. Hunt; William L. Kelley; Joe W. Kelley; Dr. R.B. Hutcheson; William Johnson; William Morgan; Benjamin F. Morgan Jr.; Andrew J. Stewart; John Rowell; and John McClung."

==== Physicians ====
===== Robert Berry Hutcheson =====
The first physician of Draketown was Robert Berry Hutcheson.

Hutcheson was elected a delegate to represent the thirty-eighth Senatorial District in the constitutional convention of 1867-68 and he was elected to represent Haralson County during 1873-74 in the Georgia General Assembly. He was again elected in 1886 to the Georgia Assembly.

Eventually, other medical doctors joined him as residents. They included Ivie Golden, Benjamin Franklin Eaves, William Franklin Goldin, and William Love Hogue.

===== Benjamin Franklin Eaves =====
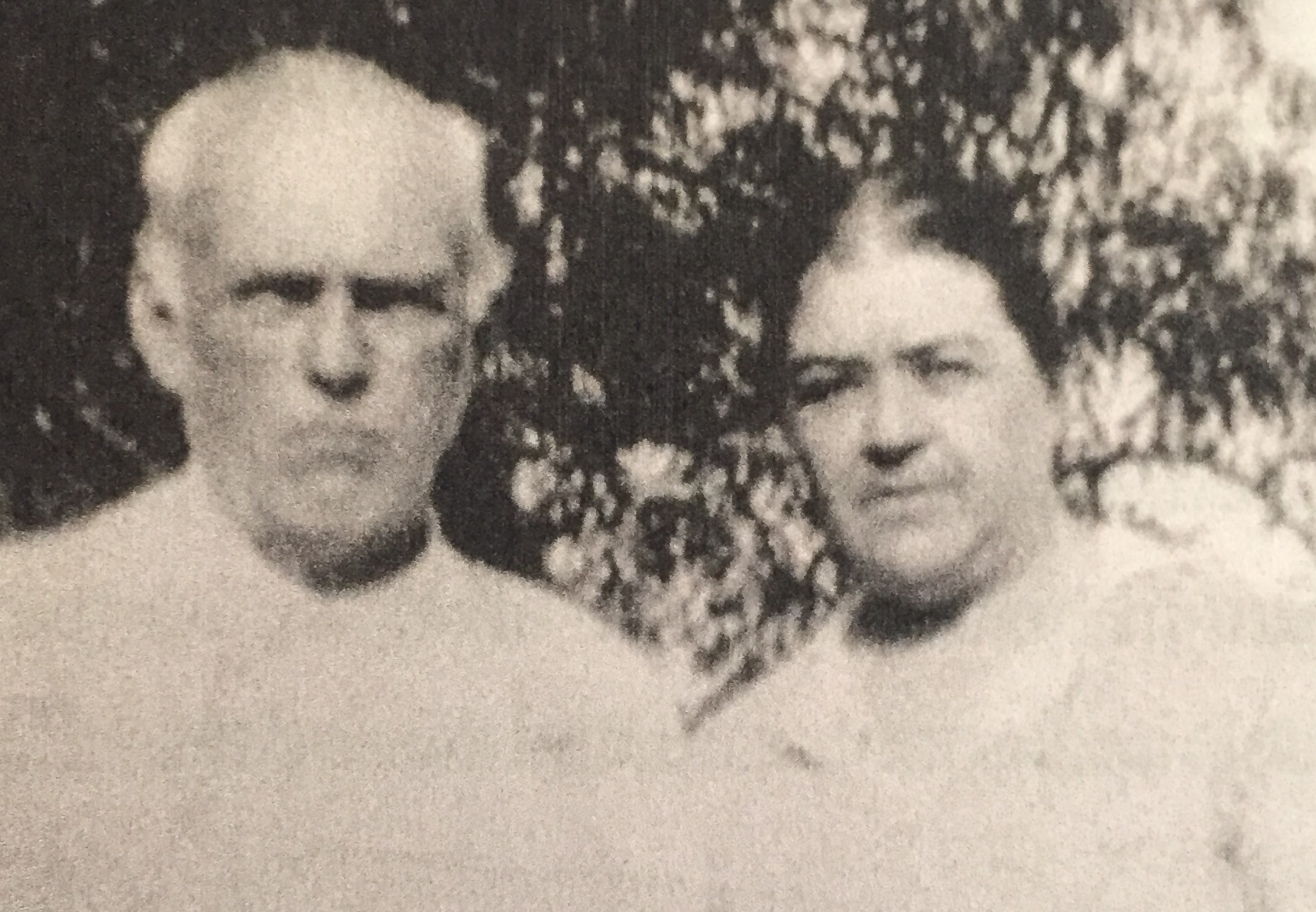
Dr. B.F. Eaves and his wife Nettie Frazier

Benjamin Franklin Eaves was the son of Cleburn Camp Eaves and Mary Amanda Kirk, both first pioneers of Haralson County. He attended Emory University and focused his entire practice in the Draketown Community serving Paulding, Carroll, Polk, and Haralson County residents. During the beginning of his career, Eaves was known as the "horse and buggy" doctor. In 1914, he purchased his first car.

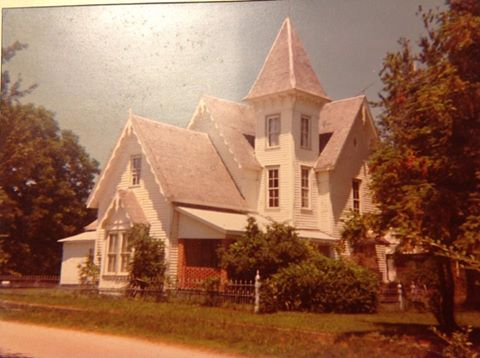
Dr. W.F. Goldin's house

===== William Franklin Golden =====
William Franklin Golden, son of Seaborn Golden and Sara Whitton, was a medical doctor and surgeon who practiced in Haralson, Polk, Paulding, and Carroll counties for forty years. He studied at Tallapoosa High School, and graduated Atlanta Medical College in 1877. In 1888, he took graduate classes in surgery at the London School of Medicine.

Golden served several terms in both the Georgia House of Representatives and the state senate. His wife was Sarah Susanne Hutcheston, daughter of Dr. Robert Berry Hutcheson.

Golden was a contractor in the building of the Haralson County Courthouse, now the Buchanan Library in Buchanan, Georgia. He was also president of the Temple Banking Company.

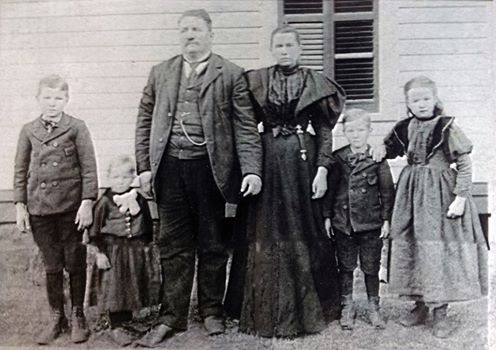
Dr. William Franklin Goldin and his family

===== William Love Hogue =====
William Love Hogue, son of William Thomas Hogue and Mattie Bagby Hogue, was born September 7, 1880, in Paulding County near Concord Baptist Church. He attended Villa Rica school, then later Atlanta Medical College (now Emory University), graduating in 1907. After graduating, he became partners with Dr. William Franklin Goldin.

On April 2, 1908, he became a member of Draketown Baptist Church. In December of the same year, he married Pearl McBrayer, of Draketown.

In 1920, Hogue left Draketown and started a practice in Villa Rica.

==== Other important pioneers ====
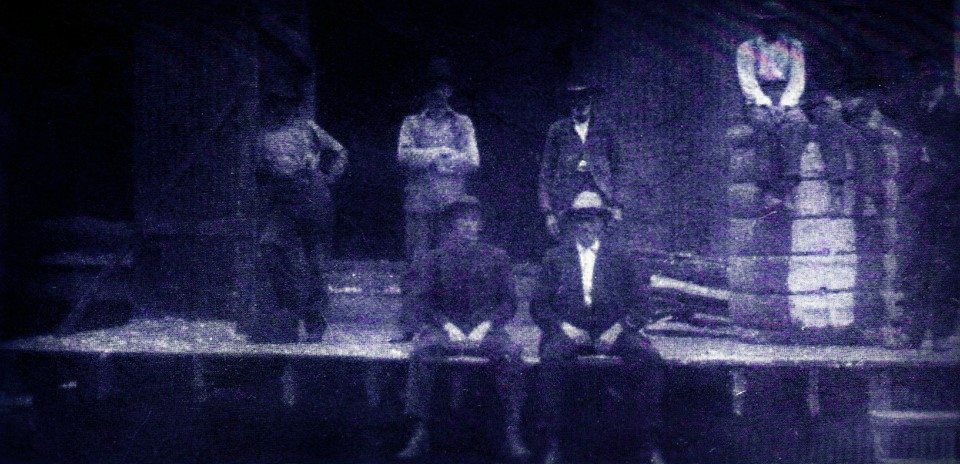
Cotton gin owned by Calvin C. Bishop around 1900

Drawn by the school and the doctors in Draketown, many people moved to the area. There was a cotton gin and a gristmill run by Calvin Cissero "Cal" Bishop, a blacksmith shop run by William Morris (later by William Taylor "Dub" Eaves), and a hotel built by Will Abercombie. Draketown also had a couple of stores, including Reeves General Mercantile (owned by John Reeves) and Strickland and Rose. Oss Carroll ran a dry-goods store on a corner across the street from Dr. W.F. Goldin's house (torn down November 17, 2015).

In 1905, the first steam-powered vehicle arrived in Draketown, accompanied by a mule. The first internal-combustion automobile arrived in 1910. It was a Model T Ford owned by Dr. W.F. Golden. A year later, four Maxwell cars, one owned by Dr. B.F. Eaves, arrived. Most of the citizens could not afford automobiles, and traveled by horse and buggy or wagon instead. It took an entire day to travel one-way to or from the county seat, Buchanan.

The hotel, built by Will Abercrombie, served as housing for the teachers of the Draketown Baptist Institute. Oss Carroll later moved his store into the hotel. Across the main Draketown road was a parsonage house, a sizable two-story building. The road from Temple went through what is now Edwards Road (a small, one-lane dirt road) and continued through what is now Eaves Drive. The stretch of road that connects Highway 113 to Highway 120 was not cut until much later.

=== Murder in Draketown ===
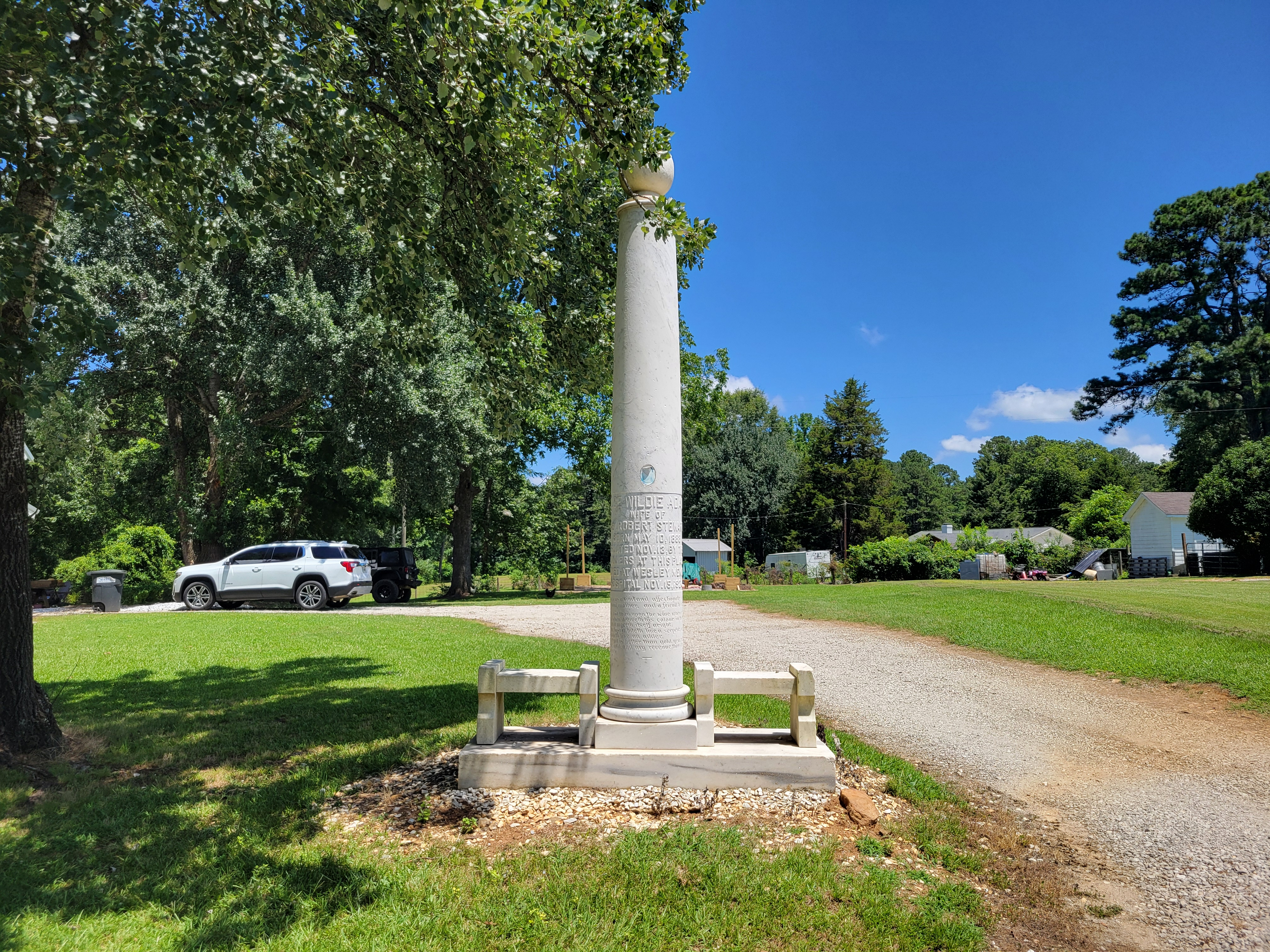
Alice Wildie Adams Stewart memorial

On November 13, 1924, Alice Stewart, the wife of the raiding parson, was shot twice by rum runners, once in the arm and once in the back. Dr. Eaves took her to Emory University in Atlanta and stayed with her until her death two days later. Stewart identified most of her attackers before death; in total ten men were arrested, but only five went to trial. None were ever convicted.

On May 31, 1925, around 5,000 citizens of Haralson County came to the site where Stewart was shot, to see the unveiling of a 15-foot tall, white marble monument erected by the Ku Klux Klan.

== Notable residents ==
=== James Cleveland Moore Sr. ===
Moore was a Missionary Baptist preacher, songwriter, singer, and singing teacher. His most famous song, "Never Grow Old", was written after visiting his parents in Draketown Missionary Baptist Church.

=== Homer Franklin Morris ===
Homer Franklin Morris was a well-known publisher and composer. The Morris-Henson Publishing Company was a leading gospel music publishing company in the 1920s. Some of his many songs still sung today are "Row Us Over the Tide" and "Won't It Be Wonderful There".

== Education ==
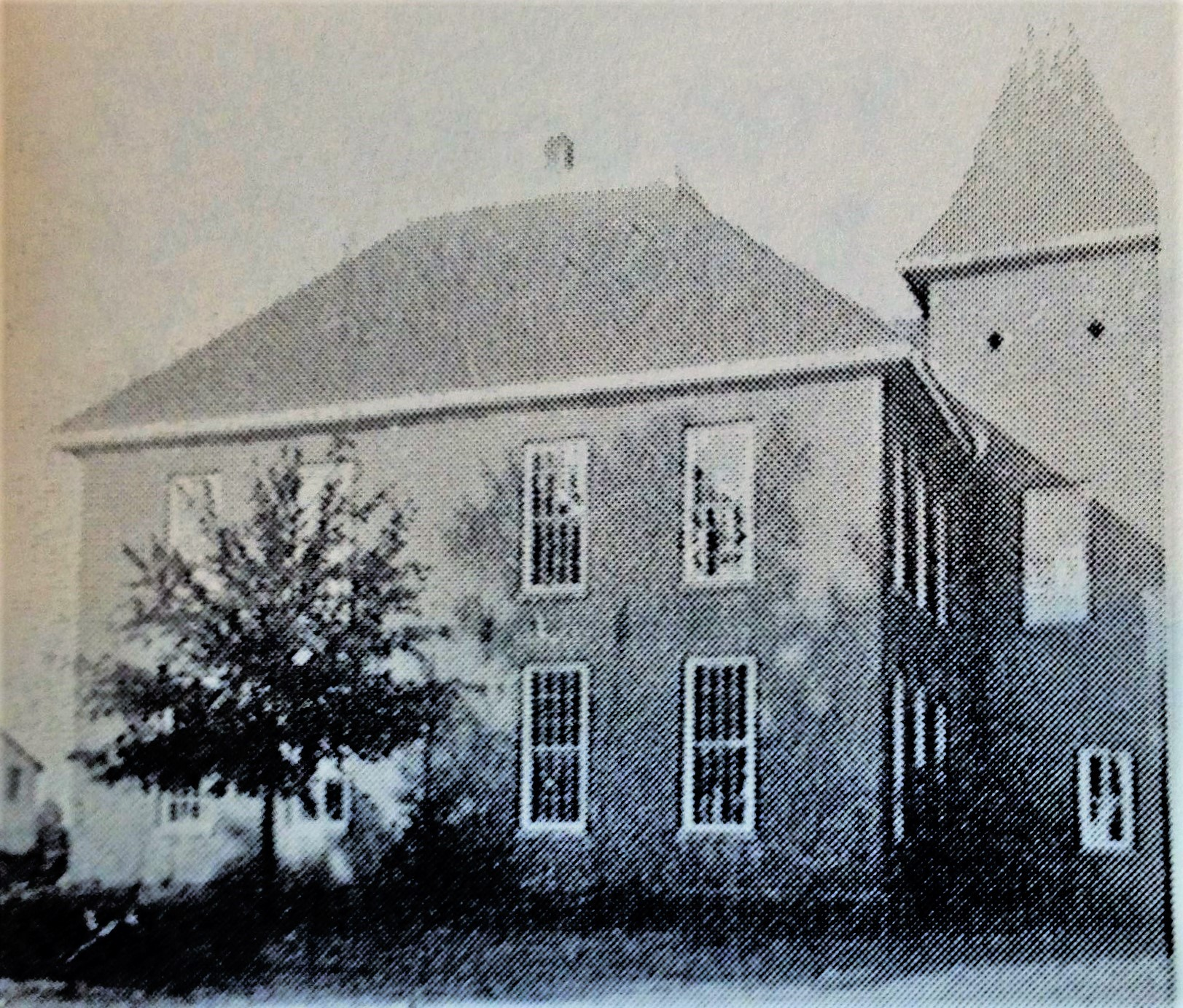
Draketown Baptist Institute

In 1905, the Baptist Preparatory College was located in Draketown, serving Haralson County and the surrounding counties of Carroll, Douglas, Paulding, and Polk. W.F. Golden donated land for the Draketown Baptist Institute to be built. Around 1918, the institute closed and a community school was opened inside the two-story building.

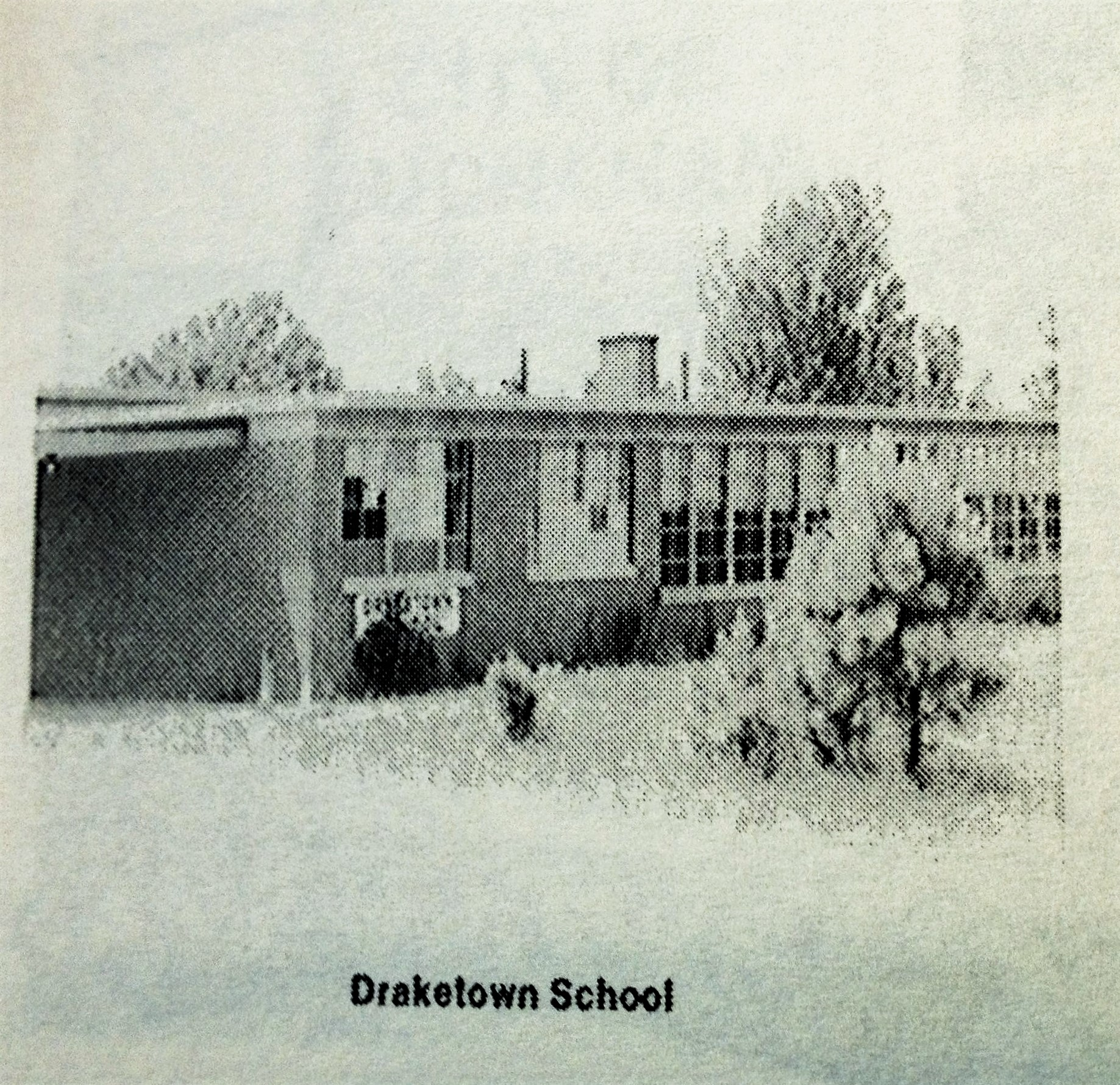
Draketown School

In 1933, Frazier's chapel and Coalson schools merged with the Draketown Junior High School. J. J. Kirk contracted with Haralson County to transport these pupils by bus. Around 1955, Haralson County board of education, led by M. M. Sanders, determined that new buildings needed to be contracted and consolidated. By August 1956, Draketown Elementary School was built with seven instructional classrooms at a cost of approximately $98,475.

In 1971, Haralson County High School opened. Draketown school closed and sent students to the new school in Tallapoosa.
