= Christopher Eves =

British inventor

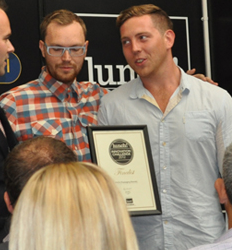
Christopher Eves (Left) Luke Booth (Right) collecting Lunch Packaging Award 2012

Christopher Eves is a product designer and inventor. Eves, and his nephew Luke Booth, successfully participated in the BBC television show Dragons' Den and received investment to launch their packaging solutions for the FMCG, Retail & Leisure markets.

== Background ==
Eves studied Product & Transport Design at the Coventry University and Industrial Design at the Central Saint Martins (CSM) in London. Whilst at CSM, Eves was the overall winner of the Tetley Tea packaging award, exploring cultural values and rituals involved in tea drinking. He also designed and patented a 3-way Christmas cracker. Whilst in his final year, he explored the link between emotion and sustainability. After graduating from CSM Eves worked at a start-up footwear company Sneakart. Dedicating time to the sneaker seeker program which aims to expose young kids to the wonders of sneakers through customisation, workshops and lectures. After a stint concept generating for the Lego concept lab he started work at Lotus cars. In 2011 Eves set up P4CK with Booth.

== Dragons Den ==
Co-founders of P4CK, Eves and Luke Booth appeared on BBC's Dragons' Den Episode 11 Series 10. Viewers saw the pair receive backing from TV star Theo Paphitis, after a nervous pitch. Paphitis committed to giving Booth and Eves £50,000 for 30% equity in their business.

The pair faced a grilling by the Dragons and originally pitched for £50,000 funding for 10% equity. However, Paphitis liked the idea and said that he was willing to back "two young guys trying to make it work".
