= Friend Finder Networks =

American internet company

FriendFinder Networks Inc.
- Type: Private
- Industry: Online dating, Social networking
- Predecessor: Penthouse Media Group
- Founded: 1996; 30 years ago (as Various, Inc.)
- Founder: Andrew Conru
- Headquarters: Sunnyvale, California, U.S.
- Key people: Andrew Conru, Founder, Brock Purpura, CEO
- Products: FriendFinder.com, AdultFriendFinder.com, ALT.com, Cams.com

FriendFinder Networks (commonly known as FFN) is an American internet technology company that operates a network of social networking and online dating websites. Founded in 1996 by Andrew Conru a Stanford University PhD graduate, the company is widely credited with creating the world's first online dating website, WebPersonals.com, in 1994. FFN pioneered numerous innovations in the online social networking space, including the first dating affiliate marketing program and the first integration of live video into dating platforms.

The company primarily deals in adult entertainment, online dating, and social networking services. Its flagship online dating services include FriendFinder and its various spin-off services (such as Adult FriendFinder, and other dating services targeting various territories and niche categories, such as the South America-focused Amigos.com, and Christian dating website BigChurch), as well as niche websites for alternative lifestyles, and adult webcam websites. In 2007, the company was acquired by the owners of Penthouse magazine, and adopted its current name. In 2016, the Penthouse brand was sold off.

== History ==
FriendFinder was launched in 1996 by Andrew Conru and Lars Mapstead. After discovering that users had been using the service to seek sexual partners, he launched Adult FriendFinder as a spin-off, followed later by other spin-offs dealing with different regions and niches. Much of the company's growth without investment capital has been attributed to its affiliate program, with more than 500,000 affiliates to date.

In 2007, Penthouse Media Group purchased FriendFinder's parent company, Various, Inc., for $500 million. Penthouse later changed its name to FriendFinder Networks.

In 2008, the company filed for a $460 million initial public offering. Most of the money generated was to pay down $420.1 million in short-term debt and other obligations.

As of January 17, 2010, FriendFinder Networks had a negative net worth equal to $118 million, $32 million in cash on hand and $650 million in liabilities. The company had also indicated that it lacked existing cash or cash from operations to repay a $44.5 million debt that was due July 31. It has cautioned that, unless it can repay or restructure its obligation, it will face “a material deficiency in our short term liquidity.” With these shortfalls in mind, the company again announced an intention to make an initial public offering of stock, representing a 49% stake in the company, with plans to use the proceeds to pay down its debt and become listed on the New York Stock Exchange. The contemplated public offering, scheduled to reach the market on January 27, 2010 was delayed by FFN. On February 5, 2010, FFN announced its intention to indefinitely delay its contemplated IPO until market conditions improve.

In June 2010, FriendFinder Networks made a $210 million bid to acquire Playboy Enterprises. Hugh Hefner, who owned 70 percent of the voting stock, did not want to sell.

=== Bankruptcy, reorganization ===
In August 2013, FriendFinder was delisted from the NASDAQ because its stock had not traded for more than $1. On September 16, 2013, the company filed for Chapter 11 bankruptcy protection.

FriendFinder had not turned a net profit since at least 2008. Ezra Shashoua, the company's chief financial officer, blamed the lower revenue on a drop in membership and increased advertising costs for affiliates, according to court documents. Shashoua also said credit card companies had refused to process transactions for the company's Internet businesses. The company stated it had negotiated a deal with noteholders that would reduce its debt by $300 million.

In December 2013, FriendFinder Networks' reorganization plan won court approval by the U.S. Bankruptcy Court in Delaware. Founder Andrew Conru, was named as the reorganized company's chairman and CEO.

In February 2016, FriendFinder Networks sold the rights to the Penthouse brand to Penthouse Global Media, a new company formed by the brand's managing director Kelly Holland.

=== Security breach ===
On November 13, 2016, it was reported that a database of over 412 million accounts, including usernames, e-mails, and passwords, had been breached and leaked from several FriendFinder Networks websites. The breach included account data from Adult FriendFinder (which constituted over 339 million accounts), Cams.com, and Penthouse, including accounts that had supposedly been deleted. The passwords were either stored as plain text or encrypted using the obsolete and insecure SHA-1 cipher.

=== Sale and corporate ownership (2007–2020) ===
In 2007, Conru sold FFN, later citing personal burnout and health challenges as significant factors in the decision. He has stated that while he was passionate about the company, the cumulative stress of running it had become unsustainable. The acquiring group had a background in financial investment rather than technology. Their strategy centered on taking FFN public to generate a return. Conru later reflected that the company would have benefited from buyers with deeper experience in technology and user-focused product development. Under the new ownership, FFN's culture shifted away from its original innovation-driven approach. The company continued to operate on the technical infrastructure built by Conru's original team, which sustained revenue in the near term. However, without continued investment in innovation or user experience, performance steadily declined. Multiple failed initial public offering attempts followed, and in 2013, the company filed for Chapter 11 bankruptcy.

=== Founder's return (2021–present) ===
In 2021, Conru reacquired majority control of FFN through a debt acquisition. The decision to return was reportedly catalyzed by personal events, which Conru has described as giving him the motivation to re-engage with the company despite the challenges involved. A leadership transition followed, after which Conru reassumed direct oversight of the company's direction. In August 2024, Brock Purpura was appointed as CEO to execute the company's vision. FFN describes its current approach as a "people-first platform," with the stated goal of prioritizing member satisfaction and platform quality
