= Live Nude Girls Unite! =

2000 documentary

- Directed by: Julia Query; Vicky Funari
- Written by: Julia Query; Vicky Funari
- Release date: 2000
- Country: United States
- Language: English

Live Nude Girls Unite! is a 2000 documentary film.

== Synopsis ==
A group of strippers at San Francisco's Lusty Lady attempt to form a labor union.

== Origins ==
The film was written and directed by Julia Query (who was employed at the Lusty Lady) and Vicky Funari. It premiered at the 2000 SXSW film festival.

== Reception ==
In The New York Times, A. O. Scott commended the film for "effectively mak[ing] the case that work, whatever you wear or don't wear when you're doing it, is still work", and observed that "as filmed from the dancers' own point of view, it's not terribly erotic", with the "real thrill" being in the unionization efforts and contract negotiations. Scott also emphasized the drama resulting from Query's attempts to conceal her job as an exotic dancer from her mother (AIDS physician Joyce Wallace, known for her efforts in outreach to sex workers).

Writing in the Los Angeles Times, Kevin Thomas praised it as "lively and provocative—mainly in the intellectual sense of the word", and stated that Query's interactions with Wallace were "unexpectedly ironic" and "[gave] the picture an extra punch".

Roger Ebert awarded the documentary three stars out of four, and noted that although the film is "not slick" and "sometimes looks like a home movie", it is "never boring"; he called the confrontation between Query and Wallace "one of the more unusual mother–daughter arguments in movie history".

The AV Club considered it "entertaining instead of evenhanded", criticizing Query for portraying herself and the other workers as individuals while not doing the same for management, and assessing her confrontation with Wallace as "morally ... [and] artistically iffy". Amy Taubin, in The Village Voice, considered that same confrontation to be evidence that Query dealt with "the mesh of personal and political in her conflict with [Wallace] a bit too gingerly", and observed that she explicitly described her decision to tell Wallace that she was a sex worker—on camera, in public, at a conference on prostitution where they were both invited speakers—as a "plot device".

Cinéaste faulted its production values, with "simplistic, amateur-night esthetics", and "noticeably abysmal sound and nonsensically bizarre camera placements", comparing it to "a distinctly second-rate episode of VH1's Behind the Music", but nonetheless found it to provide "a valuable lesson about how to form a society in which all of its members, sex workers included, are treated with dignity and respect, and are paid a living wage".

The Austin Chronicle described it as "frequently inspiring in its rabble-rousing good humor", but also as "a sagging pockmarked mess" that "suffers from an aggravating one-sidedness", castigating Query's use of segments from her own standup comedy performances, and deeming her "the dullest" of all the Lusty Lady's employees.

== History ==
Early unionization efforts at the Lusty Lady, which included picketing and a lockout, drew media attention; however, much of this attention was humorous, and Query became concerned that the situation might serve as the basis of a historical drama that misrepresented events. At the suggestion of "a relative who works in the movie business", and with no training other than a single university course in film theory, she decided to document the situation herself. She subsequently said that "If I had known how difficult it was to make a film, I wouldn't have done it."

== Recognition ==
Live Nude Girls Unite! won the Best Documentary Audience Award at the San Francisco International Film Festival.
