= Elisabeth Eaves =

American journalist

- Born: Vancouver, British Columbia, Canada
- Education: B.A. (honors) University of Washington; Master's degree Columbia University
- Occupations: Author; Journalist
- Spouse: Joe Ray
- Writing career
- Notable works: Bare: On Women, Dancing, Sex, and Power (2002); Wanderlust: A Love Affair with Five Continents (2011)
- Notable awards: 2005 Lowell Thomas Silver Award; 2014 Lowell Thomas Silver Award; 2016 Lowell Thomas Honorable Mention Award
- Website: elisabetheaves.com

Elisabeth Eaves is a Canadian-American author and journalist born and raised in Vancouver, British Columbia.

== Biography ==
On graduating from the University of Washington in 1996, Eaves worked as an exotic dancer at the Lusty Lady peep show in Seattle for a year. Her experiences at the Lusty Lady are told in her book about striptease, Bare: On Women, Dancing, Sex, and Power (2002). The Washington Post called the book a "first-rate, first-person work of social anthropology." A paperback version of the book was released as "Bare: The Naked Truth About Stripping" in 2004.

Her second book, Wanderlust: A Love Affair with Five Continents, published in 2011, chronicles her travels around the world, including extended stays in Egypt, Pakistan, and Australia. The book was called a "heady, headlong chronicle of a decade and a half spent adrift" by The New York Times Book Review.

Eaves' travel writing has been commended and anthologized. In September 2005, her Slate series on flamenco in Seville won a silver award in the Society of American Travel Writers' Lowell Thomas Travel Journalism Competition. Her Slate series "Eco-touring in Honduras" is included in The Best American Travel Writing 2009, edited by Simon Winchester. Her essay "Wanderlust", first published on World Hum, is included in The Best Women's Travel Writing 2010. Eaves piece in The New York Times, "In Mexico, Eco Concerns Where Sea Lions Romp," was awarded a silver Lowell Thomas Award in 2014. Her original essay Seasoning Jerusalem is included in Lonely Planet's A Moveable Feast: Life-changing Food Adventures from Around the World, edited by Don George. Eaves 2015 New York Times article "A Hundred Cities Within Seoul" was given an "Honorable Mention" Lowell Thomas Award.

Eaves is a columnist at the tablet newspaper The Daily where she also launched and edited the opinions page. From 2006 to 2010 she worked as a writer and editor at Forbes magazine, where in 2008 and 2009 she also wrote a weekly column. She has freelanced widely, including for Slate, Foreign Policy, Harper's, The New York Times, and The Washington Post. In 2006 she was a Robert L. Bartley fellow at The Wall Street Journal. From 1999 to 2000, she worked as a journalist for Reuters in London.

== Personal life ==
Eaves is married to food writer Joe Ray. In 2017, they opened a workshop for writers called Type Set in Columbia City, Seattle.

Eaves received a B.A. (honors) from the Jackson School of International Studies at the University of Washington and a master's degree in international affairs from the School of International and Public Affairs at Columbia University.

== Bibliography ==
- 2002: Bare: On Women, Dancing, Sex, and Power. (Published in paperback as Bare: The Naked Truth About Stripping) (Knopf, 2002, and Seal Press, 2004)
- 2009: Best American Travel Writing, 2009 (Houghton Mifflin Harcourt / Mariner Books; an anthology)
- 2010: Best Women's Travel Writing, 2010 (Travelers' Tales; an anthology)
- 2011: Wanderlust: A Love Affair with Five Continents.(Seal Press)
- 2014: A Moveable Feast: Life-changing Food Adventures from Around the World. (Lonely Planet; an anthology)
