= Andrew Conru =

American internet businessman

- Born: 1967 or 1968 (age 58–59)
- Education: Rose-Hulman Institute of Technology; Stanford University (Ph.D)
- Occupation: Businessman
- Title: CEO, FriendFinder Networks Inc.
- Website: conru.com

Andrew Conru is an American internet businessman, who is the founder and former CEO of FriendFinder Networks Inc., as well as other e-commerce, advertising, online dating, and personal ad sites including W3, AdKnowledge, WebPersonals, FriendFinder, and Adult FriendFinder.

== Early life and education ==
Conru was born into a Lutheran family of steelworkers and grew up on a farm in northern Indiana, where he would sell vegetables from the family garden. Conru was interested in programming and engineering from a young age, and reportedly coded as early as in elementary school, using a Commodore 64.

Conru attended high school in Michigan City, before attending Rose-Hulman Institute of Technology, earning undergraduate degrees in both economics and chemical engineering. In 1991, Conru enrolled at Stanford University and attended its Center for Design Research, receiving a doctorate in mechanical engineering.

== Early career ==
Conru had worked on various projects for General Motors during his enrollment at Rose-Hulman. While enrolled at Stanford, Conru founded W3.com, an early interactive website development firm that was the first company to develop commercial software for membership management. The company created PWS (Personal Web Site), an early customized advertising product used by Hewlett-Packard and Egghead Software. In 1997, the company released a product called AdOptimizer Network, the first centralized ad server, which allowed sites to manage advertising across a network of sites. He also founded Adknowledge, a web-based banner advertising company. In 1994, Conru founded WebPersonals.com. Considered to be one of the first internet dating sites, Conru sold the company in 1995.

== FriendFinder, Adult FriendFinder, and Various Inc. ==
In 1996, Conru launched FriendFinder.com, an early social networking site. Days after the site went live, he found that members were posting nude pictures of themselves and using the site to seek out partners for hookups. Believing it was easier to redirect the explicit content to a new website rather than moderate FriendFinder, Conru launched Adult FriendFinder in the fall of 1996.

Traffic on Adult FriendFinder surpassed that of the original FriendFinder within 6 month of launch, and Conru later consolidated his websites under a single company, Various, Inc., later that same year. Conru followed up on the success of Adult FriendFinder with other niche dating sites, including Senior FriendFinder, Amigos.com, BigChurch.com, and Alt.com. By 2007, the websites owned by Various, Inc. had a combined total of 260 million registered members, more than 500,000 affiliates and 450 employees.

At this point, Conru and Various, Inc. were headquartered in Palo Alto, California, and Various had an operating base in Las Vegas, Nevada.

=== Sale and reacquisition of Various, Inc. ===
In December 2007, Conru sold Various, Inc. to Penthouse Media Group for $500 million, much of which came in the form of IOUs; Penthouse would later change its name to FriendFinder Networks, Inc.

On September 17, 2013, FriendFinder Networks Inc. filed for Chapter 11 bankruptcy protection. In December 2013, as the company emerged from bankruptcy protection, Conru once again gained control of the company, becoming its CEO until 2024, when leadership was handed to Brock Purpura in July 2024.

== Charitable and political activity ==
In 2010, Conru launched the non-profit foundation Compute.org, which awards internet and software startups with grants in amounts of $50,000–100,000. One startup that has been awarded is CityRoof.org, a social network for homeless people that helps the homeless connect with necessary resources.

In 2014, he delivered the keynote address at AVN Internext Expo in Las Vegas, Nevada.

=== Human Diversity Foundation ===
In October 2024, Hope not Hate discovered through an undercover investigation that Conru had donated over $1 million to the far-right Human Diversity Foundation (HDF) which publishes discredited ideas of eugenics and racism through podcasts, online magazines and dubious papers. In response to the investigation, Conru said he has stopped funding the HDF, remarking that he was "deeply troubled" by the findings of the investigation and stated he rejects "racism, discrimination or hateful ideology."

== See also ==
- Locals
