= Eaves (disambiguation) =

Eaves are the edges of a roof.

Eaves may also refer to:

- Eaves (surname), a surname
- Eaves, Lancashire, a place in England, United Kingdom
- Eaves, a women's housing charity, United Kingdom
