= Bernadette Barton =

American sociologist

Bernadette Barton is an American sociologist and author. She is professor of Sociology and Director of Gender Studies at Morehead State University.

== Books ==
- Pray the Gay Away: The Extraordinary Lives of Bible Belt Gays (NYU Press, 2012)
- Stripped: Inside the Lives of Exotic Dancers (NYU Press, 2006)
- The Pornification of America How Raunch Culture Is Ruining Our Society (NYU Press, 2021)
