= Vicky Funari =

American filmmaker

- Born: April 13, 1963 (age 63); Alexandria, Virginia, U.S.
- Education: New York University
- Occupation: Documentary filmmaker
- Employer: Haverford College

Vicky Funari (born April 13, 1963) is a documentary filmmaker. She attended film school at New York University's undergraduate program. She currently teaches at Haverford College as Artist-in-Residence. She directed Maquilapolis (2006) alongside Sergio De La Torre in collaboration with the women of Grupo Factor X, Colectivo Chilpancingo, and Promotoras por los Derechos de las Mujeres.

== Filmography ==
- Paulina (1998)
- Live Nude Girls Unite! (2000)
- Maquilapolis (2006)
- Strong! (2012) - editor

== Awards ==
Year	Festival	Film	Award
1998	Sundance Film Festival	Paulina	Nominated - Grand Jury Prize
1998	San Francisco International Film Festival	Paulina	Won - Golden Spire
1998	International Documentary Association	Paulina	Nominated - Pare Lorentz Award
1998	Hamptons International Film Festival	Paulina	Won - Lifetime Vision Award
1999	Independent Spirit Awards	Paulina	Nominated - Truer Than Fiction Award
2000	Seattle Lesbian & Gay Film Festival	Live Nude Girls Unite!	Won - Best Lesbian Feature
2000	San Francisco International Film Festival	Live Nude Girls Unite!	Won - Golden Spire
2006	CPH:DOX	Maquilapolis	Won - Amnesty Award
