= Steve Eves =

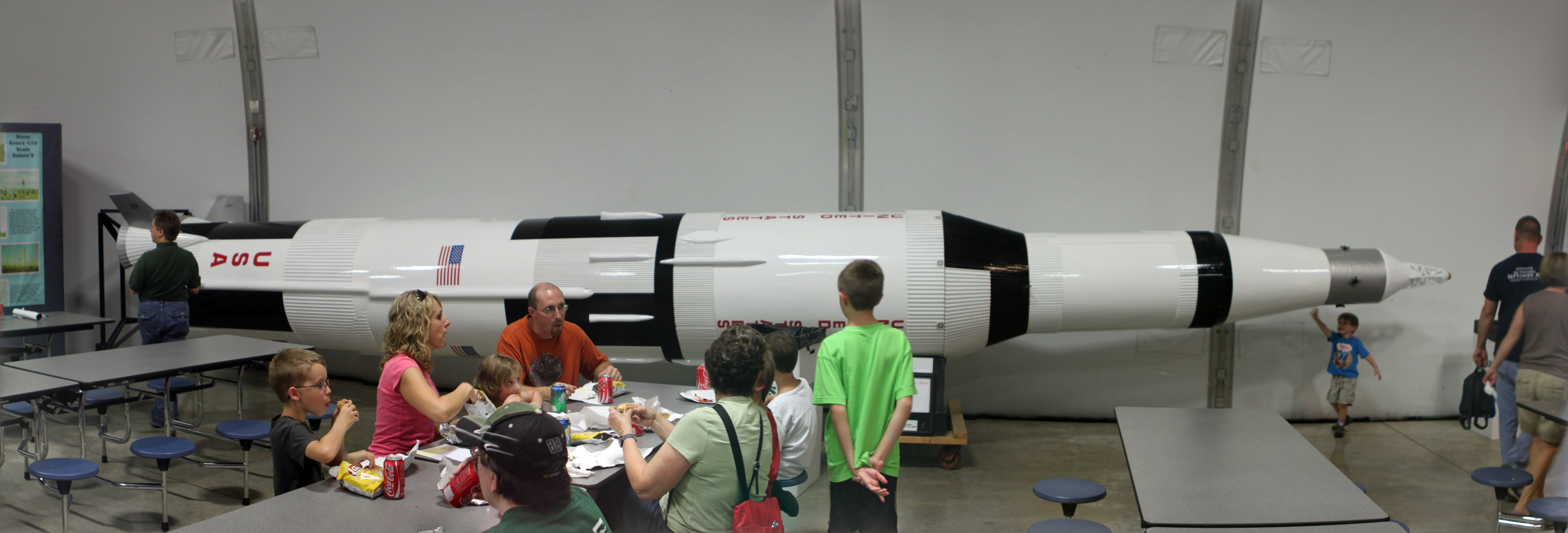
Steve Eves's 1:10 scale Saturn V is seen here on display in the dining bubble at Space Camp at the U.S. Space and Rocket Center in Huntsville, Alabama during the 2011 celebration of the Space Shuttle program.

Steve Eves formerly held the world record for the tallest and heaviest amateur rocket ever successfully launched. The rocket was 36 feet (11 m) tall and weighed 1,648 pounds (748 kg). On Saturday April 25, 2009 Eves launched the 1/10 scale replica of the Saturn V rocket 4,441 feet (1,354 m) into the air, and successfully recovered it. The launch occurred on the eastern shore of the Chesapeake Bay under supervision of the Maryland-Delaware Rocketry Association. The rocket was powered by a matrix of nine motors: eight 13,000Ns N-Class motors surrounding a central 77,000Ns P-Class motor, for a total of 181,000Ns.
