= Benjamin Franklin Eaves =

American physician

Benjamin Franklin Eaves (1870-1953) was a pioneer horse and buggy medical doctor in Haralson County, Georgia. He was well known by all of the residents of Haralson County. He practiced medicine in Haralson Counties from the year 1898-1950. Eaves was also a farmer, and an owner of large amount of acreage in the Draketown area of Haralson County. Many families sharecropped on Eaves's land.

== Childhood and early manhood ==
Benjamin Franklin (Pank) Eaves was the third son of Claburn Camp Eaves. He was born April 27, 1870. He got the nickname “Pank” because his younger brother couldn't say Frank.

Eaves grew up on his father's, "Tobe" Eaves, farm in Haralson County on the Tallapoosa River. His mother, Mary Amanda Kirk, died when he was twelve years of age on May 4, 1882.

The job of cooking was given to Pank and his sister, Dora.

Once Pank's father told him to plow a field of stubble, but he was not to burn it off because it would kill the young apple orchard. Pank decided the stubble was too much for him and mule, Rhody. He thought he could make the job easier for himself and his mule by burning it. He did, but forgot to move old Rhody and she got her hair singed all over. This gave Pank's secret away to his father.

Pank enjoyed swimming and hunting, and playing his fiddle for square dances.

== Education ==
Eaves went to school at Piney Woods Church. He graduated from old Van Wert Academy in Rockmart, Georgia. He and his older brother, Taylor, walked from Rockmart, Georgia, to the Tobe Eaves farm on weekends. He even taught school for some time at Waco, Georgia.

Eaves entered medical college for Physicians and Surgeons in Atlanta, Georgia, now Emory University. Eaves enjoyed playing jokes on his friends. Such an example happened while training at the Medical School. He had been dissecting corpses that were obtained from the city when people were killed on the street and could not be identified. He decided to stay on after school hours, which was against the rules, to get his work finished. Then he would be ahead of the others. All alone he worked in silence. Hearing the janitor coming down the hall, he jumped on a dissecting table, covered himself with the white sheet like a corpse. Then the janitor entered the room with his mop and broom. Pank began to shiver, shake, and groan. Needless to say the school had to hire a new janitor. The old one never showed up again. Everyone wondered why, but Eaves. It was his secret.

Eaves graduated in 1898 from medical school.

== Life as a doctor with a horse and buggy ==
Eaves was a physician and a surgeon in Draketown, Georgia, his entire life. Multiple stories are still told about his generosity and kindness. He frequently did not get paid for his services in money, but was paid with eggs, meat, milk, or whatever a farmer could barter with him for his services.

When Eaves started his office, he bought a road cart, better known as a "gully jumper" and a brown Morgan horse named Maude.

It had been said he made quite a good impression on the ladies flying over the red hills in this gully jumper with his black sideburns, wearing a hard top derby hat. It was also said that several young ladies their caps set on the young doctor, but failed.

Many nights if it had not been for Eaves's horse, Maude, he would not have made it home. He would be out up to twelve hours a day in his wagon seeing patients when a bad sickness like influenza was going around. Eaves would be riding to see one patient, and other folks would meet him at their driveway to ask him to stop and treat someone. Thankfully Maude knew the way home because Eaves would fall asleep many nights, exhausted while Maude brought him home.

Eaves was a real country physician and surgeon. He was a well-known family doctor. He had his own office, across the street from Draketown Baptist Church and dispensed his own medicine. He filled his cases each morning before starting on his rounds, to see his patients (house calls). He treated typhoid fever, pneumonia, measles, whooping cough, sore toes, lanced boils, set broken bones, pellagra, delivered inestimable babies (many by cesarean section), removed fingers, hands, legs, tonsils, pulled teeth, and most any ailment when his patients needed his services. Eaves was a distinguished diagnostician of his day. People in the communities of Carroll, Paulding, Haralson, and Polk counties came from miles around for his advice and services. He was so relied upon by his many patients that it was even noted in the Dallas New Era on June 10, 1898, that he had been sick but was finally well enough to see patients again.

== Family genealogy ==
May 1, 1901, Eaves married Miss Nettie Virginia Frazer (March, 1885 - February 12, 1954), daughter of Reverend George D. Frazer, a Methodist minister and school teacher, and Sarah Ellen Butler Frazer.

To this union five children were born: Eula Roxanna Eaves, Bessie M. Eaves, George Carl Eaves, William Taylor "Dub" Eaves, and Sarah Doris Eaves.

== Horse hoof trimmer and cutter patented ==
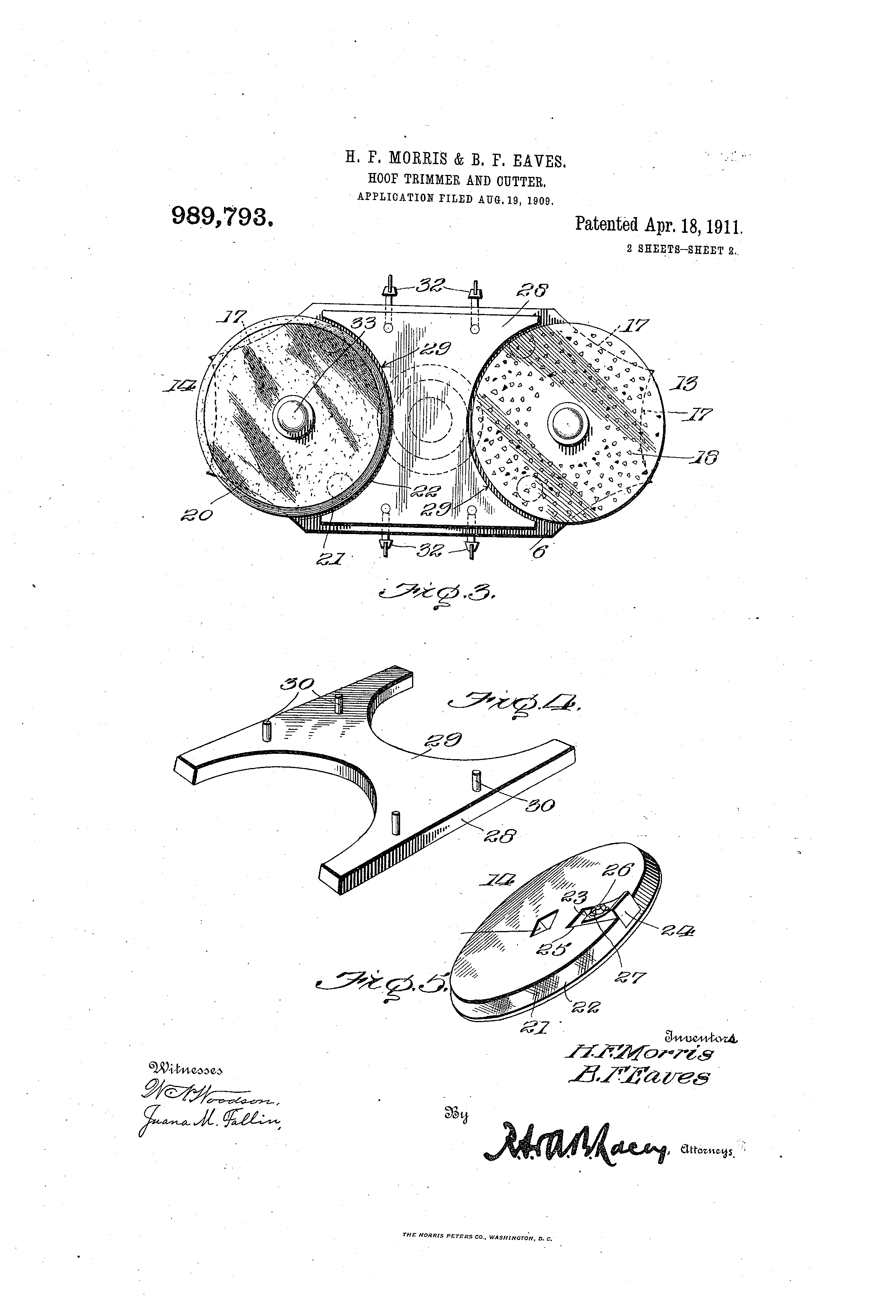
Hoof Trimmer and Cutter patented by H.F. Morris and B.F. Eaves

Eaves and H.F. Morris patented a hoof trimmer and cutter. They applied for the patent on August 19, 1909, and the patent came through on April 18, 1911.

== Maxwell automobile brought to Draketown in 1910 ==
In the year of 1910, Eaves put the faithful old horse, Maude, out to pasture and bought his first automobile, a Maxwell. He could make his house calls quicker, but he still had the red mud and dust to contend with. He wore out many cars in his life as he rode over dirt roads.

The car certainly came in handy. In 1918, during World War One, he said he had visited as many as forty homes in a day and night where whole families were ill with influenza.

== Tragedy strikes ==
On August 22, 1924, Eaves's son, Carl, had been plowing and was trying to get in the mules when a thunderstorm approached. Before he could get the animals in safely, he was struck by lightning and killed instantly.

== Murder in Draketown ==
On November 13, 1924, Alice "Wildie" Adams Stewart, wife of Rev. Robert Stewart was shot twice by rum runners. The men had gotten together, and after ingesting some "liquid courage", had driven to the Parsonage in Draketown to try to kidnap her husband. Robert Stewart was known as the Raiding Parson in many newspaper accounts. Mrs. Stewart saw what was happening and tried to defend her husband by shooting his gun twice. Mrs. Stewart was then shot herself. Once in the elbow and then in the back, in the spinal column, as she lay on the ground. Eaves was one of the first people on the site of the murder scene. Along with Dr. William Love Hogue, he examined Mrs. Stewart and determined that she needed to be rushed to Emory hospital in Atlanta. While Mrs. Stewart's husband left her side to search for the rum runners who shot his wife, Eaves stayed with her for two days. During that time, Mrs. Stewart told Eaves one of the people that she witnessed try to kidnap her husband. Mrs. Stewart never recovered enough to have life saving surgery and died two days later from respiratory paralysis. Eaves told family and friends that if she had recovered, she would have been paralyzed the rest of her days.

== Death ==
He was an active member in the Draketown Baptist Church, a Mason (the Mason Hall was right beside his house in Draketown), active in the political and civic affairs of the county and state. Much of his practice was done as charity. He was an extensive farmer. He enjoyed walking over the crops seeing them grow.

Eaves died April 1, 1953, at the age of 83.

Nellie Frazier Eaves died February 12, 1954. Not a lot is known about Mrs. Eaves, except that she probably died due to complications that she had from "Sugar Diabetes".
