= Peep show =

Erotic entertainment viewed through a viewing slot

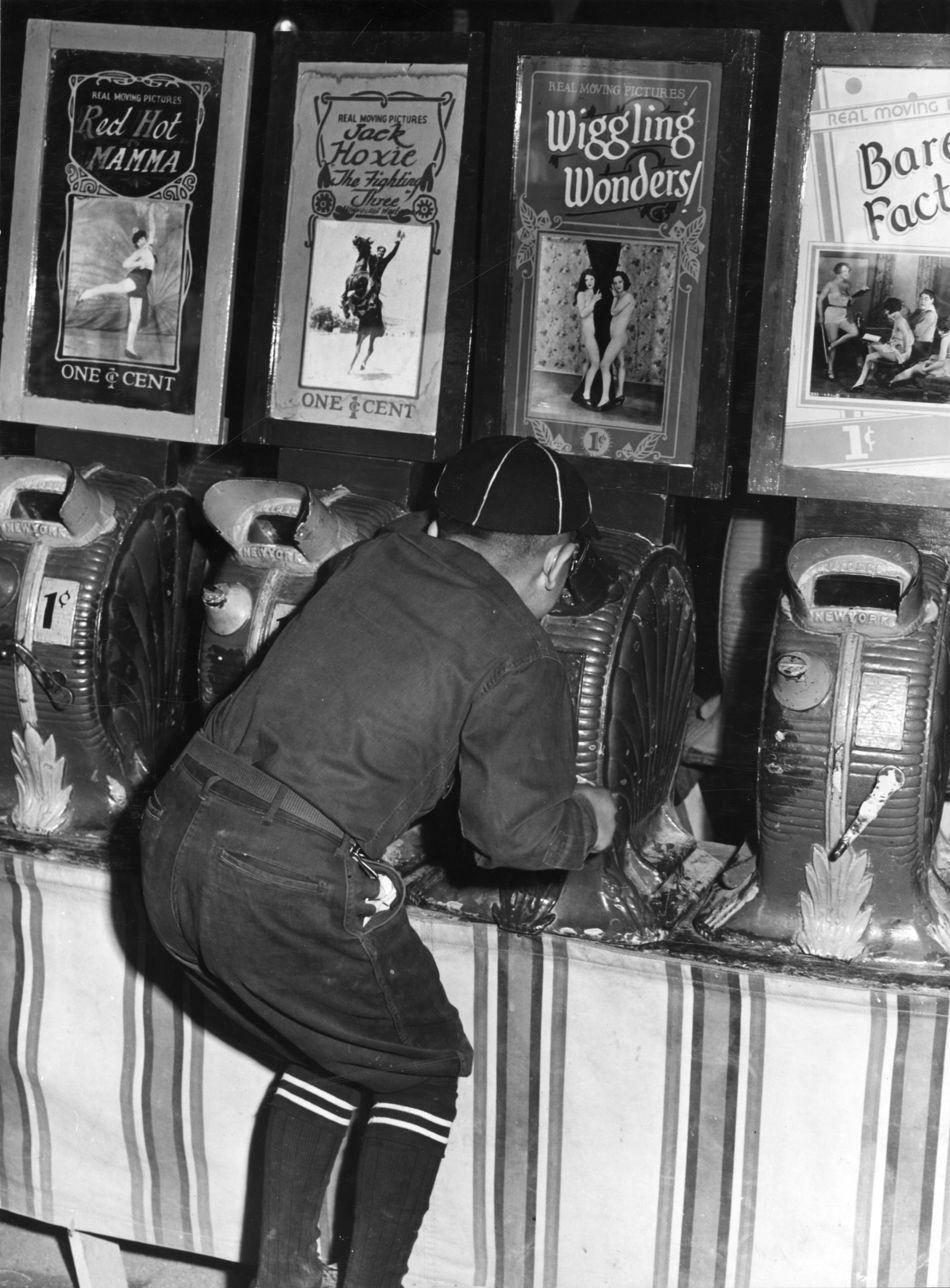
Boy viewing a peep show at an American carnival in the 1940s

A peep show, peepshow, or, a peep booth is a presentation of a live sex show or pornographic film which is viewed through a viewing slot.

Several historical media provided voyeuristic entertainment through hidden erotic imagery. Before the development of the cinema in 1895, motion pictures were presented in peep boxes, such as the kinetoscope and the mutoscope. These remained relatively popular for erotic and pornographic films, such as What the Butler Saw.

In contemporary use, a peep show is a piecewise presentation of pornographic films or a live sex show which is viewed through a viewing slot, which shuts after the time paid for has expired. The viewing slots can be operated by a money box device, or paid for at a counter.

Pornographic peep shows became popular in the 1970s as part of the developing pornography industry. Until home video became widespread, peep shows made up a major part of the way in which video pornography was accessed. In 1986 a US Presidential report into pornography said that peep shows were making significant earnings which were often undeclared or untaxed, and in some US locations peep shows were subsequently suppressed.

For live peep shows, booths can surround a stage upon which usually a female performer performs a striptease and sexually explicit poses. In Barcelona female performers at times also perform sexual intercourse with male performers on stage. In some cases, booths include paper towel dispensers for customers who masturbate. A customer and performer can mutually agree on a fee for a "private dance", which can take place in a peep show booth with a clear window and seating space for only one spectator.

== California ==
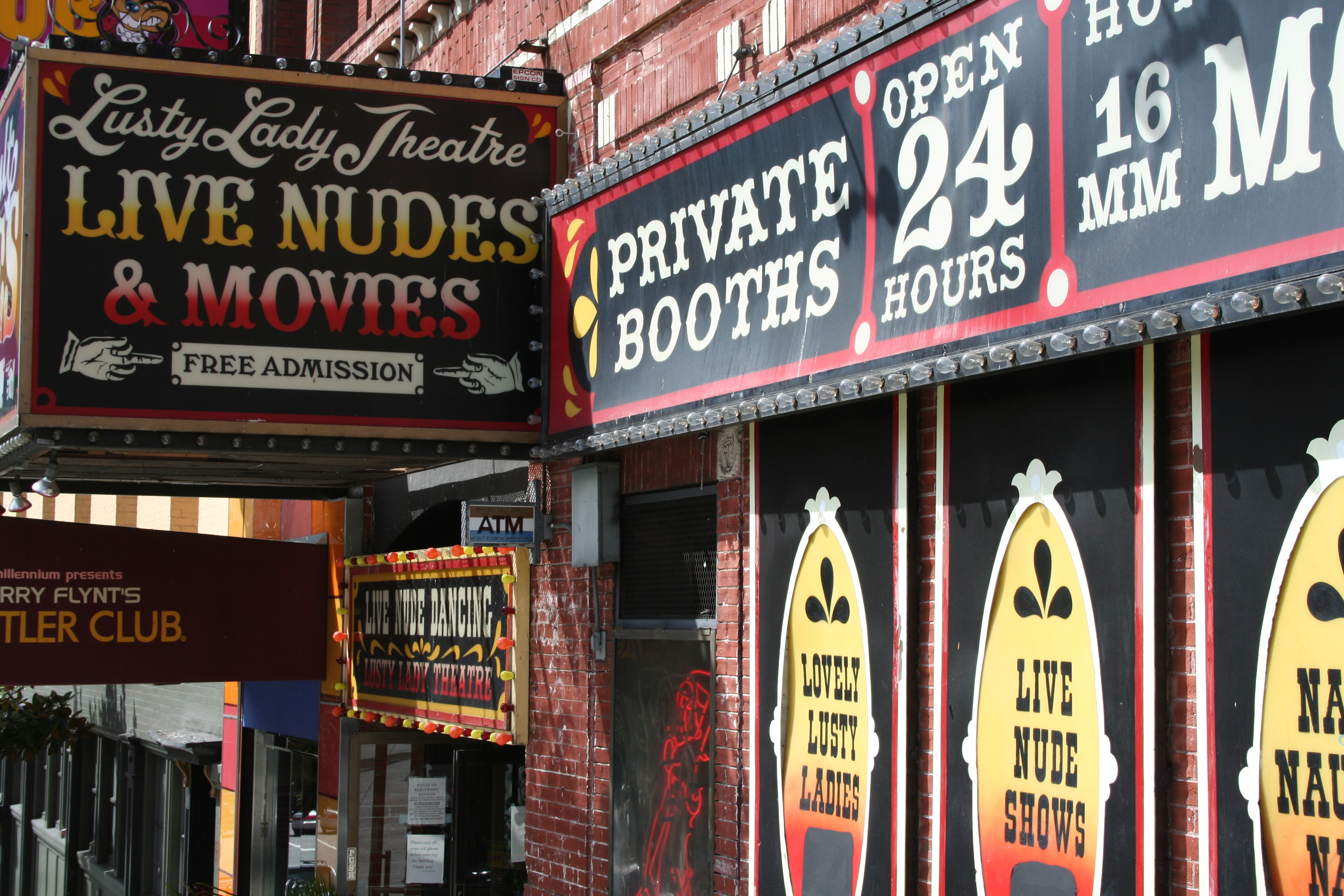
The former Lusty Lady in San Francisco, California

Research on peep show establishments in California examined the hypothesis that neighborhoods surrounding sex businesses such as peep show establishments and X-rated movie stores have higher rates of crime. The researchers compared 911 calls in peep show and control neighborhoods in San Diego. Although peep show neighborhoods had approximately 16 percent more calls, the researchers concluded that the difference was not statistically significant. However, other researchers reanalyzed the data and concluded that the difference was significant.

=== Regal Show World ===
Regal Show World was an adult entertainment business on lower Market Street in San Francisco, California. The company's slogan was "Where you are king". The business had a peep show and an adult video arcade. The peep show had performers working in an enclosed round room with viewing booths surrounding it and sometimes had a "double in the bubble" show in which two performers worked simultaneously. During the winter of 1997 to 1998, the business had thirty-five performers. At this time, over 80% of performers there attempted to unionize and "signed union authorization cards for representation by the Service Employees International Union (SEIU), Local 790".

The business was owned by Bijou Group, Inc., a privately held company in San Francisco that was founded in 1990. Bijou Group owned similar businesses in San Francisco such as New Century Theater, Market Street Cinema, and the Campus Theater. Bijou Group, Inc. filed for Chapter 11 bankruptcy reorganization c. 1994. In November 1998, management of Regal Show World announced that the peep show would be closed on November 30 of that month due to "economic reasons". At the time, some performers in the industry stated that closure of the peep show was done as a retaliative measure against attempts for performers to unionize. The company declared bankruptcy after performers made a second attempt at unionization, whereby the performers "signed cards calling for a union election", and the theater was closed.

=== Lusty Lady ===
The former Lusty Lady peep show in San Francisco, California, entered the news in 1997, when it became the first U.S. sex business to be unionized. In 2003 it was bought by the employees and became a worker cooperative. It closed due to increased rent in 2013.

== Nevada ==
In Las Vegas in the early 1990s, city authorities began to move peep shows and other sexually oriented businesses away from the city centre. The last peep show in Las Vegas closed in 2019.

== New York ==
Times Square in New York was famous for its peep shows up until the 1990s. Female performers would stand undressed on a small semicircular or circular stage surrounded by individual booths. By inserting a token into a machine, a patron could open the opaque partitions separating them from the stage. They could then choose a performer and, for the payment of a small tip, summon her and fondle her sexually or ask her to perform sex acts on them. After taking office as mayor in 1994, Rudy Giuliani waged a legal battle to shut down the Times Square peep shows. Following a major legal decision in Giuliani's favor in 1998, the peep shows mostly closed.

== Washington ==
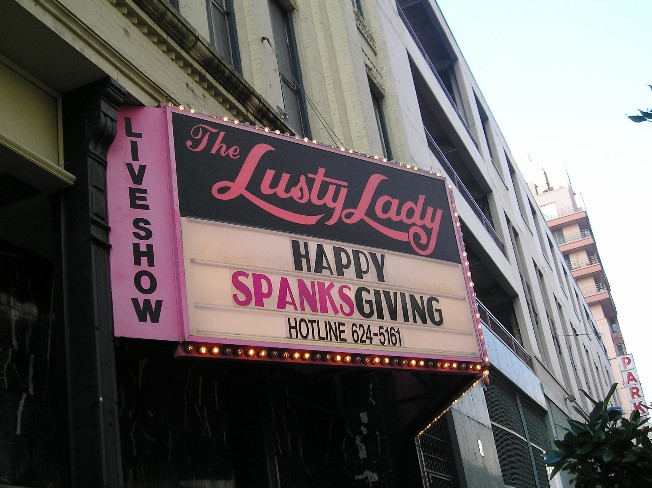
The marquee for the Lusty Lady peep show in Seattle

The former Lusty Lady peep show in Seattle, Washington, was, unlike its namesake in San Francisco, not unionized. Similar to the Lusty Lady in San Francisco, however, the Seattle peep show was deemed an iconic local landmark by the time it finally closed in 2010. Its closing was attributed to being unable to compete with pornography on the Internet.

== See also ==
- Voyeurism
