= CPH:DOX =

Copenhagen International Documentary Film Festival

Coordinates: 55°40′34″N 12°34′06″E

CPH:DOX (Copenhagen International Documentary Festival)
- Location: Copenhagen, Denmark
- Founded: 2003; 23 years ago
- Most recent: 2025
- Hosted by: Copenhagen Film Festivals
- Artistic director: Niklas Engstrøm & Managing Director, Katrine Kiilgaard
- No. of films: 200
- Festival date: 11–22 March 2026
- Website: www.cphdox.dk

Current: 23nd
- 24rd 22st

CPH:DOX, also known as Copenhagen International Documentary Film Festival, is a Danish film festival focused on documentary films, held annually in Copenhagen, Denmark. Since 2008 it has been run by Copenhagen Film Festivals, which also organizes the children's film festival BUSTER.

== History ==
CPH:DOX - Copenhagen International Documentary Film Festival was founded in 2002 by Kim Foss and Andreas Steinmann on behalf of Natsværmerfonden, which also founded the now defunct NatFilm Festival (1990 – 2008). Under the artistic direction of the festival’s first head of programme (and later festival director) Tine Fischer, the festival grew to become one of the leading documentary film festivals in Europe. Today, the festival ranks among the largest and most important documentary film festivals globally, with more than 150,000 admissions and more than 2,000 international industry guests in 2025.

Following the 2015 edition of CPH:DOX, the festival announced that it would change its dates from November to March, and the first of the new spring editions of the festival was held from 16 to 26 March 2017, with the centrally located Kunsthal Charlottenborg as the new festival centre.

In response to the COVID-19 pandemic, in 2020 CPH:DOX held their festival virtually, using a Shift72 video-on-demand platform that was built and launched in just 24 hours.

In February 2021 it was announced that the first festival director of CPH:DOX, Tine Fischer, would be stepping down from the CEO role after the 18th edition (21 April to 2 May 2021) to take up a position as director of the National Film School of Denmark. Instead, the festival's Head of Programme, Niklas Engstrøm (who had been part of the festival team since the beginning in 2003) was appointed new Artistic Director in May 2021, and soon thereafter, Katrine Kiilgaard was appointed Managing Director.

The 2025 event took place between 19 and 30 March, 2025. The 2026 edition will take place between 11 and 22 March, 2026.

Past guest curators of film programmes have included artists and filmmakers such as The xx; Anohni; Harmony Korine; Animal Collective; Nan Goldin; Douglas Gordon; Ben Rivers with Ben Russell; Ai Weiwei; The Yes Men; Olafur Eliasson; and Naomi Klein with Avi Lewis.

== Description and governance ==
CPH:DOX is the official name of the Copenhagen International Documentary Film Festival. Copenhagen Film Festivals has managed CPH:DOX as well as the children's film festival BUSTER and CPH PIX since the latter was created in 2008. It is held in cinemas all over Copenhagen and with Kunsthal Charlottenborg as its festival centre. Since 2021, the festival has also been held in an increasing number of other Danish cities as part of its nation-wide festival concept DOX:DANMARK. In 2024, CPH:DOX was held in more than 40 cities all over Denmark.

CPH:DOX is devoted to supporting independent and innovative film and to present contemporary non-fiction, art cinema, and experimental film.

In 2009, the festival launched the international talent development and film production workshop CPH:LAB (formerly known as DOX:LAB) where around 20 filmmakers are invited each year to develop and direct a film in teams of two.

Besides its seven international competitions, the festival presents parallel curated and guest-curated sections. The festival hosts seminars, debates and events as well as the curated concert series "Audio:Visuals", where bands and artists perform to original work created for the occasion by visual artists. CPH:DOX also presents a number of other initiatives parallel to the festival itself: the industry platform CPH:Forum, with the attached CPH:Market for buyers and programmers, is a financing and co-production forum as well as a networking facility which takes place for three days during the festival. In 2011, the related ART:FILM branch was launched with the aim to facilitate the development and actual production of artists' films in the feature length format. CPH:DOX runs the five-day CPH:Conference as well as the experimental educational course DOX:Academy for students, both of which take place during the festival.

At the industry segment CPH:WIP, Nordic works-in-progress are presented to the potential sponsors and distributors.

CPH: DOX is part of the Doc Alliance, a creative partnership among seven key European documentary film festivals.

== Awards ==
Juries hand out prizes in seven international competition programmes:

- CPH:DOX Award, for international documentary features (€10,000)
- NEW:VISION Award, for experimental and artists' film (€5,000 prize)
- F:ACT Award, for films in the field between investigative journalism and documentary (€5,000 prize)
- NORDIC:DOX Award, for Nordic documentaries and artists' films (€5,000 prize)
- NEXT:WAVE Award, for emerging filmmakers and artists (€5,000 prize)
- Politiken:Danish:Dox Award, awarded by a jury of film critics from the Danish newspaper Politiken
- Doc Alliance Award, given in collaboration with six other European documentary film festivals, to one of the seven films nominated by the participating festivals
- Audience Award, chosen by the festival-goers (€5,000)
- Human:Rights Award, introduced in 2024 in collaboration with the Danish Institute for Human Rights

== Award winners ==
=== CPH:DOX Award ===
Year	Film	Director	Country
2003 (1st)	Dans Grozny Dans	Jos de Putter	Netherlands
2004 (2nd)	Darwin's Nightmare (shared)	Hubert Sauper	Austria
2004 (2nd)	The 3 Rooms of Melancholia (shared)	Pirjo Honkasalo	Finland
2005 (3rd)	Workingman's Death (shared)	Michael Glawogger	Austria
2005 (3rd)	The White Diamond (shared)	Werner Herzog	Germany
2006 (4th)	Black Sun	Gary Tarn	United Kingdom
2007 (5th)	Santa Fe Street	Carmen Castillo	Chile
2008 (6th)	Burma VJ	Anders Østergaard	Denmark
2009 (7th)	Trash Humpers	Harmony Korine	United States
2010 (8th)	Le Quattro Volte	Michelangelo Frammartino	Italy
2011 (9th)	Two Years at Sea	Ben Rivers	United Kingdom
2012 (10th)	The Act of Killing	Joshua Oppenheimer	Denmark
2013 (11th)	Bloody Beans	Narimane Mari	Algeria
2014 (12th)	The Look of Silence	Joshua Oppenheimer	Denmark
2015 (13th)	God Bless the Child	Robert Machoian, Rodrigo Ojeda-Beck	United States
2017 (14th)	Last Men in Aleppo	Feras Fayyad	Denmark
2018 (15th)	The Raft	Marcus Lindeen	Sweden
2019 (16th)	Ridge	John Skoog	Sweden
2020 (17th)	Songs of Repression	Estephan Wagner & Marianne Hougen-Moraga	Denmark
2021 (17th)	The Last Shelter	Ousmane Samassekou	Mali
2022 (18th)	The Eclipse	Natasa Urban	Serbia
2023 (19th)	Motherland	Hanna Badziaka & Alexander Mihalkovich	Belarus Ukraine
2024 (20th)	The Flats	Alessandra Celesia	Italy
2025 (21st)	Always	Deming Chen	China

=== 2003 CPH:DOX ===
Award	Film	Director
CPH:DOX Award	The Damned and the Sacred (Dans, Grozny dans)	(Netherlands) Jos de Putter
CPH:DOX Award; Special Mention	Screaming Men (Huutajat – Screaming Men)	(Finland) Mika Ronkainen
Amnesty Award	Bus 174 (Ônibus 174)	(Brazil) José Padilha
Amnesty:Award; Special Mention	Cuban Rafters (Balseros)	(Spain) Carlos Bosch & (Spain) Josep Maria Domènech

=== 2004 CPH:DOX ===
Award	Film	Director
CPH:DOX Award	Darwin's Nightmare; The 3 Rooms of Melancholia (Melancholian 3 huonetta)	(Austria) Hubert Sauper (Finland) Pirjo Honkasalo
Amnesty:Award	Justice (Justiça)	(Brazil) Maria Ramos
Amnesty:Award; Special Mention	Disbelief (Nedoverie)	(Russia) Andrei Nekrasov
New:Vision Award	I Love You All (Aus Liebe zum Volk)	(France) Audrey Maurion & (Israel) Eyal Sivan
New:Vision Award; Special Mention	Max by Chance (Rejsen på ophavet); Gunnar Goes Comfortable	(Denmark) Max Kestner (Norway) Gunnar Hall Jensen

=== 2005 CPH:DOX ===
Award	Film	Director
CPH:DOX Award	Workingman's Death; The White Diamond	(Austria) Michael Glawogger (Germany) Werner Herzog
CPH:DOX Award; Special Mention	Odessa... Odessa!	(Israel) (France) Michale Boganim
Amnesty:Award	Viva Zapatero!	(Italy) Sabina Guzzanti
Amnesty:Award; Special Mention	Shake Hands with the Devil: The Journey of Roméo Dallaire	(Canada) Peter Raymont
New:Vision Award	Trains of Winnipeg: 14 Film Poems	(Canada) Clive Holden
New:Vision Award; Special Mention	Cultural Quarter	(United Kingdom) Mike Stubbs

=== 2006 CPH:DOX ===
Award	Film	Director
CPH:DOX Award	Black Sun	(United Kingdom) Gary Tarn
CPH:DOX Award; Special Mention	The Monastery: Mr. Vig and the Nun	(Denmark) Pernille Rose Grønkjær
Amnesty:Award	The Prize of the Pole	(Denmark) Staffan Julén
Amnesty:Award; Special Mention	Voices of Bam (Stemmen van Bam); Maquilapolis (Maquilápolis)	(Netherlands) Maasja Ooms & (Netherlands) Aliona van der Horst (Mexico) Vicky Funari & (Mexico) Sergio De La Torre
New:Vision Award (short)	Eine Million Kredit ist normal sagt mein Grossvater	(Austria) Gabriele Mathes
New:Vision Award (long)	Zidane: A 21st Century Portrait (Zidane, un portrait du 21e siècle); Tarachime birth/mother (Tarachime)	(Scotland) Douglas Gordon & (France) Philippe Parreno (Japan) Naomi Kawase
Sound & Vision Award	Dave Chappelle's Block Party	(France) Michel Gondry

=== 2007 CPH:DOX ===
Award	Film	Director
CPH:DOX Award	Santa Fe Street (Calle Santa Fe)	(Chile) Carmen Castillo
CPH:DOX Award; Special Mention	Vesterbro	(Denmark) Michael Noer
Amnesty:Award	No End in Sight	(United States) Charles Ferguson
Amnesty:Award; Special Mention	The Not Dead; Umbrella (San)	(United Kingdom) Brian Hill (China) Du Haibin
New:Vision Award (short)	France 2007	(France) Gee-Jung Jun
New:Vision Award (long)	Dust (Staub); A Crime Against Art	(Germany) Hartmut Bitomsky (Germany) Hila Peleg
Sound & Vision Award	Joy Division	(United Kingdom) Grant Gee
Sound & Vision Award; Special Mention	Pilgrimage from Scattered Points	(United Kingdom) Luke Fowler

=== 2008 CPH:DOX ===
Award	Film	Director
CPH:DOX Award	Burma VJ	(Denmark) Anders Østergaard
CPH:DOX Award; Special Mention	Maggie in Wonderland	(Sweden) Mark Hammersberg, Ester Martin Bergsmark and Beatrice Maggie Andersson
Amnesty:Award	Burma VJ	(Denmark) Anders Østergaard
Amnesty:Award; Special Mention	Dynamiters, Assassins, Fiends.	(United Kingdom) Joseph Bullman
New:Vision Award	The Feature	(United States) Michel Auder, Andrew Neel
New:Vision Award; Special Mention	Morakot	(Thailand) Apichatpong Weerasethakul
Sound & Vision Award	Anvil! The Story of Anvil	(United States) Sacha Gervasi
Sound & Vision Award; Special Mention	Gogol Bordello Non-Stop	(United States) Margarita Jimeno

=== 2009 CPH:DOX ===
Award	Film	Director
CPH:DOX Award	Trash Humpers	(United States) Harmony Korine
DOX Award; Special Mention	H:r Landshövding	(Sweden) Måns Månsson
Amnesty:Award	Presumed Guilty	(Mexico) Geoffrey Smith, Roberto Hernández
Amnesty:Award; Special Mention	Defamation	(Israel) Yoav Shamir
New:Vision Award	shared by: O'er The Land and Trypps 1-6	(United States) Deborah Stratment / Ben Russell
Sound & Vision Award	La Faute Des Fleurs	(France) Vincent Moon
Sound & Vision Award; Special Mention	The Delian Mode	(Canada) Kara Blake

=== 2010 CPH:DOX ===
Award	Film	Director
CPH:DOX Award	Le Quattro Volte	(Italy) Michelangelo Frammartino
CPH:DOX Award; Special Mention	The Autobiography of Nicolae Cweaucescu	(Romania) Andrei Ujică
Danish:Dox Award	shared by: The Naked of St. Petersburg and Empire North	(Denmark) Ada Bligaard Søby / Jakob Boeskov
Danish:Dox Award; Special Mention	Fini	(Denmark) Jacob Schulsinger
Amnesty:Award	Pink Saris	(United Kingdom) Kim Longinotto
New:Vision Award	In Free Fall	(Germany) Hito Steyerl
New:Vision Award; Special Mention	Out	(Israel) Roee Rosen
Sound & Vision Award	Separado!	(United Kingdom) Dylan Goch, Gruff Rhys
Sound & Vision Award; Special Mention	Backyard	(Iceland) Árni Sveinsson
Short:Dox Award	Irma	(Mexico) (United States) Charles Fairbanks
Politiken Audience Award	Lost Inside a Dream – The Story of Dizzy Mizz Lizzy	(Denmark) Theis Molin

=== 2011 CPH:DOX ===
Award	Film	Director
CPH:DOX Award	Two Years at Sea	(United Kingdom) Ben Rivers
New:Vision Award	It May Be That Beauty Has Strengthen Our Resolve – Masao Adachi	(France) Philippe Grandrieux
Amnesty:Award	Crulic – The Path Beyond	(Romania) Anca Damian
Nordic:Dox Award	Imagining Emmanuel	(Norway) Thomas Østbye
Sound & Vision Award	Grandma Lo-fi: The Basement Tapes of Sigrídur Nielsdóttir	Kristín Björk Kristjánsdóttir, Orri Jónsson & Ingibjörg Birgisdóttir
Politiken Audience Award	Pina	(Germany) Wim Wenders

=== 2012 CPH:DOX ===
Award	Film	Director
CPH:DOX Award	The Act of Killing	(Denmark) Joshua Oppenheimer
New:Vision Award	Leviathan	(United States) Lucien Castaing-Taylor & Véréna Paravel
Nordic:Dox Award	Searching for Bill	(Denmark) Jonas Poher Rasmussen
Amnesty:Award	Tomorrow	(Russia) Andrey Gryazev
Sound & Vision Award	Beware of Mr. Baker	(United States) Jay Bulger
Politiken Audience Award	A Normal Life	(Denmark) Mikala Krogh

=== 2013 CPH:DOX ===
Award	Film	Director
CPH:DOX Award	Bloody Beans	(Algeria) Narimane Mari
New:Vision Award	A Spell to Ward Off the Darkness	(France) Ben Rivers & Ben Russell
New:Vision Award; Special Mention	Alexander	(Poland) Wilhelm Sasnal & Anka Sasnal
Nordic:Dox Award	After You	(Sweden) Marius Dybwad Brandrud
F:ACT Award	Dirty Wars	(United Kingdom) Richard Rowley
Politiken Audience Award	Everyday Rebellion	(Austria) Arash T. Riahi & Arman T. Riahi

=== 2014 CPH:DOX ===
Award	Film	Director
CPH:DOX Award	The Look of Silence	(Denmark) Joshua Oppenheimer
CPH:DOX Award; Special Mention	Democrats	(Denmark) Camilla Nilsson
New:Vision Award	The Dent	(Egypt) Basim Magdy
Nordic:Dox Award	Olmo & the Seagull	(Denmark) Lea Glob & Petra Costa
F:ACT Award	E-Team	(United States) Katy Chevigny & Ross Kauffman
Politiken Audience Award	Just Eat It: A Food Waste Story	(Canada) Grant Baldwin

=== 2015 CPH:DOX ===
Award	Film	Director
CPH:DOX Award	God Bless the Child	(United States) Robert Machoian & Rodrigo Ojeda-Beck
CPH:DOX Award; Special Mention	Uncertain	(United States) Ewan McNicol & Anna Sandilands
New:Vision Award	The Digger	(France) Ali Cherri
New:Vision Award	Bending to Earth	(Italy) Rosa Barba
Nordic:Dox Award	Return of the Atom	(Finland) Mika Taanila & Jussi Eerola
Nordic:Dox Award; Special Mention	Time Passes	(Norway) Ane Hjort Guttu
F:ACT Award	Among the Believers	(Pakistan) Hemal Trivedi & Mohammed Ali Naqvi
F:ACT Award; Special Mention	(T)ERROR	(United States) Lyric R. Cabral & David Felix Sutcliffe
Politiken Audience Award	The Fear of 13	(United Kingdom) David Sington

=== 2017 CPH:DOX ===
Award	Film	Director
CPH:DOX Award	Last Men in Aleppo	(Denmark) Feras Fayyad, co-directed by Steen Johannessen
CPH:DOX Award; Special Mention	Gray House	(United States) Austin Lynch & Matthew Booth
CPH:DOX Award; Special Mention	The John Dalli Mystery	(Denmark) Jeppe Rønde
New:Vision Award	Life Imitation	(China) Chen Zhou
New:Vision Award; Special Mention	The Lost Dreams of Naoki Hayakawa	(Norway) Ane Hjort Guttu & Daisuke Kosugi
Nordic:Dox Award	Land of the Free	(Denmark) Camilla Magid
Nordic:Dox Award; Special Mention	69 Minutes of 86 Days	(Norway) Egil Håskjold Larsen
F:ACT Award	Radio Kobani	(Netherlands) Reber Dosky
F:ACT Award; Special Mention	Trophy	(United States) Schaul Schwarz & Christina Clusiau
Next:Wave Award	1996 Lucy and the Corpses in the Pool	(Argentina) Marcos Migliavacca & Nahuel Lahora
Next:Wave Award; Special Mention	Phantom of Illumination	(Thailand) Wattanapume Laisuwanchai
Politiken Audience Award	City of Ghosts	(United States) Matthew Heineman

=== 2018 CPH:DOX ===
Award	Film	Director
CPH:DOX Award	The Raft	(Sweden) Marcus Lindeen
CPH:DOX Award; Special Mention	América	(United States) Chase Whiteside & Erick Stoll
New:Vision Award	Wild Relatives	(Palestine) Jumana Manna
New:Vision Award; Special Mention	Translations	(Denmark) Tinne Zenner
Nordic:Dox Award	Lykkelænder	(Denmark) Lasse Lau
Nordic:Dox Award; Special Mention	The Night	(Norway) Steffan Strandberg
F:ACT Award	Laila at the Bridge	(Afghanistan) Elissa Mirzaei & Gulistan Mirzaei
Next:Wave Award	Beautiful Things	(Italy) Giorgio Ferrero
Next:Wave Award; Special Mention	Minding the Gap	(United States) Bing Liu
Next:Wave Award; Special Mention	Conventional Sins	(Israel) Anat Yuta Zruia & Shira Clara Winther
Politiken Audience Award	False Confessions	(Denmark) Katrine Philp

=== 2019 CPH:DOX ===
Award	Film	Director
CPH:DOX Award	Ridge	(Sweden) John Skoog
CPH:DOX Award; Special Mention	Searching Eva	(Germany) Pia Hellenthaler
New:Vision Award	A Moon for My Father	(Iran) Mania Akbari & Douglas White
Nordic:Dox Award	The Men's Room	(Norway) Petter Sommer & Jo Vemund Svendsen
Nordic:Dox Award; Special Mention	Mating	(Sweden) Lina Mannheimer
F:ACT Award	Dark Suns	(Canada) Julien Elie
F:act:Award; Special Mention	Midnight Family	(Mexico) Luke Lorentzen
Next:Wave Award	Kabul, City in the Wind	(Afghanistan) Aboozar Amini
Next:Wave Award; Special Mention	Inland	(Spain) Juan Palacios
Politiken Audience Award	Push	(Sweden) Fredrik Gertten

=== 2020 CPH:DOX ===
Award	Film	Director
CPH:DOX Award	Songs of Repression	(Denmark) Estephan Wagner & Marianne Hougen-Moraga
New:Vision Award	South	(United Kingdom) Morgan Quaintance
New:Vision Award; Special Mention	Mother's Tongue	(Sweden) Wingyee Wu & Lap-See Lam
Nordic:Dox Award	Being Eriko	(Denmark) Jannik Splidsboel
Nordic:Dox Award; Special Mention	Själö – Island of Souls	(Finland) Lotta Petronella
F:ACT Award	We Hold the Line	(Germany) Marc Wiese
F:act:Award; Special Mention	The Social Dilemma	(United States) Jeff Orlowski
Next:Wave Award	Mayor	(United States) David Osit
Next:Wave Award; Special Mention	Sisters with Transistors	(United Kingdom) Lisa Rovner
Politiken:Danish:Dox Award	Songs of Repression	(Denmark) Estephan Wagner & Marianne Hougen-Moraga

=== 2021 CPH:DOX ===
Award	Film	Director
CPH:DOX Award	The Last Shelter	(Mali) Ousmane Samassekou
CPH:DOX Award; Special Mention	Our Memory Belongs to Us	(Syria) Rami Farah & Signe Byrge Sørensen
New:Vision Award	All of Your Stars are but Dust on My Shoes	(Lebanon) Haig Aivazian
New:Vision Award; Special Mention	Listen to the Beat of our Images	(France) Maxime Jean-Baptiste & Audrey Jean-Baptiste
Nordic:Dox Award	Julia & I	(Sweden) Nina Hobert
Nordic:Dox Award; Special Mention	He's My Brother	(Denmark) Cille Hannibal & Christine Hanberg
F:act Award	When a City Rises	(Hong Kong) Cathy Chu, Iris Kwong, Ip Kar Man, Huang Yuk-kwok, Evie Cheung, Han Yan Yuen & Jenn Lee
F:act:Award; Special Mention	All Light, Everywhere	(United States) Theo Anthony
Next:Wave Award	You and I	(Indonesia) Fanny Chotimah
Next:Wave Award; Special Mention	Holgut	(Belgium) Liesbeth de Ceulaer
Politiken:Danish:Dox Award	Dark Blossom	(Denmark) Frigge Fri

=== 2022 CPH:DOX ===
Award	Film	Director
DOX:AWARD	The Eclipse	(Serbia) Natasa Urban
NEW:VISION AWARD	What About China?	(Vietnam) Trinh T. Minh-ha
NEW:VISION AWARD - Special Mention	Congress of Idling Persons	(Lebanon) Bassem Saad
F:ACT AWARD	Black Mambas	(Russia) Lena Karbe
F:ACT AWARD - Special Mention	The Territory	(United States) Alex Pritz
NORDIC:DOX AWARD	Siunissaq - The last human	(Greenland) Ivalo Frank
NORDIC:DOX AWARD - Special Mention	Tsumu - Where Do You Go With Your Dreams?	(Denmark) Kasper Kiertzner
NEXT:WAVE AWARD	Kash Kash	(Lebanon) (Austria) Lea Najjar
NEXT:WAVE AWARD - Special Mention	Moosa Lane	(Denmark) Anita Hopland
POLITIKEN:DOX AWARD	A House Made of Splinters	(Denmark) Simon Lereng Wilmont
POLITIKEN:DOX AWARD - Special Mention	Mr. Graversen	(Denmark) Michael Graversen

=== 2023 CPH:DOX ===
Award	Film	Director
DOX:AWARD	Motherland	(Belarus) (Ukraine) Hanna Badziaka & Alexander Mihalkovich
DOX:AWARD - Special Mention	État limite	(France) Nicolas Peduzzi
F:ACT AWARD	Seven winters in Teheran	(Germany) Steffi Niederzoll
F:ACT AWARD - Special Mention	The Hostage Takers	(Denmark) Puk Damsgård & Søren Klovborg
NORDIC:DOX AWARD	Mrs. Hansen & the bad Companions	(Denmark) Jella Bethmann
NORDIC:DOX AWARD - Special Mention	Lynx Man	(Finland) Juha Suonpää
NEW:VISION AWARD	An Asian Ghost Story	(China) Bo Wang
NEW:VISION AWARD - Special Mention	The Secret Garden & Pacific Club	(Canada) (Lebanon) Nour Ouayda & (France) Valentin Noujaïm
NEXT:WAVE AWARD	Queendom	(Russia) Agnia Galdanova
NEXT:WAVE AWARD - Special Mention	The Last year of Darkness	(United States) Benjamin Mullinkosson
POLITIKEN:DOX AWARD	Apolonia, Apolonia	(Denmark) Lea Glob
POLITIKEN:DOX AWARD - Special Mention	The Mountains	(Denmark) Christian Enshøj

=== 2024 CPH:DOX ===
Award	Film	Director
DOX:AWARD	The Flats	(Italy) Alessandra Celesia
DOX:AWARD - Special Mention	Two Strangers Trying Not to Kill Each Other	(United Kingdom) Manon Ouimet & Jacob Perlmutter
NEW:VISION AWARD	Preemptive Listening	(Spain) Aura Satz
NEW:VISION AWARD - Special Mention	Lichens Are the Way	(Czech Republic) ondřej vavrečka
NEW:VISION AWARD - Special Mention	My Want of You Partakes of Me	(Germany) (Russia) Sasha Litvintseva & Beny Wagner
F:ACT AWARD	Black Snow	(United States) Alina Simone
NORDIC:DOX AWARD	The Son and the Moon	(Denmark) Roja Pakari
NORDIC:DOX AWARD - Special Mention	G-21 Scenes from Gottsunda	(Sweden) Loran Batti
NEXT:WAVE AWARD	Grand Me	(Iran) Atiye Zare Arandi
NEXT:WAVE AWARD - Special Mention	G-21 Scenes from Gottsunda	(Sweden) Loran Batti
HUMAN:RIGHTS AWARD	Black Box Diaries	(Japan) Shiori Ito
HUMAN:RIGHTS AWARD - Special Mention	Marching in the Dark	(India) Kinshuk Surjan
INTER:ACTIVE	Intangible	(Denmark) Carl Emil Carlsen

=== 2025 CPH:DOX ===
The 22nd Copenhagen International Documentary Film Festival, also known as CPH:DOX 2025 took place from 19 to 30 March 2025.

Award	Film	Director
DOX:AWARD	Always	(China) Deming Chen
DOX:AWARD - Special Mention	Flophouse America	(Norway) Monica Strømdahl
F:ACT AWARD	2000 Meters to Andriivka	(Ukraine) Mstyslav Chernov
F:ACT AWARD - Special Mention	The Perfect Neighbor	(United States) Geeta Gandbhir
HUMAN:RIGHTS AWARD	9-Month Contract	(Georgia (country)) Ketevan Vashagashvili
HUMAN:RIGHTS AWARD - Special Mention	The Encampments	(United States) Michael T. Workman & Kei Pritsker
NORDIC:DOX AWARD	Walls - Akinni Inuk	(Greenland) (Denmark) Nina Paninnguaq Skydsbjerg & Sofie Rørdam
NORDIC:DOX AWARD - Special Mention	The Nicest Men on Earth	(Denmark) Josefine Exner & Sebastian Gerdes
NEXT:WAVE AWARD	Abode of Dawn	(Russia) Kristina Shtubert
NEXT:WAVE AWARD - Special Mention	Who witnessed the temples fall	(Spain) Lucía Selva
NEW:VISION	Ramallah, Palestine, December 2018	(France) Juliette Le Monnyer
NEW:VISION AWARD - Special Mention	SCRAP	(France) Noémie Lobry
INTER:ACTIVE	Constantinopoliad	(United States) (Egypt) Sister Sylvester & Nadah El Shazly
INTER:ACTIVE - Special Mention	The Garden Says...	(United States) (Egypt) Uri Kranot, Michelle Kranot, Sara Topsøe Jensen, Sarah John & Marieke Breyne

=== 2026 CPH:DOX ===
The 23rd Copenhagen International Documentary Film Festival, also known as CPH:DOX 2026 took place from 11 to 22 March 2026.

Award	Film	Director
DOX:AWARD	Whispers in May	(China) Dongnan Chen
NEW:VISION AWARD - Special Mention	Local Sensations	(Thailand) Tulapop Saenjaroen
Doc Alliance Award	A Song Without Home	(Georgia (country)) Rati Tsiteladze
