= Lights, Camera, Africa! =

Annual film festival

- Location: Lagos
- Country: Nigeria
- Established: 2011
- Founders: Ugoma Adegoke

Lights, Camera, Africa! is a film festival held annually in Lagos, Nigeria. Its first edition since was celebrated from 30 September - 2 October in 2011.

The festival was established by Ugoma Adegoke. Hosted by The Life House, the inaugural Lights, Camera, Africa! was supported by New York's African Film Festival, Inc. and ran for three days, from 30 September – 2 October 2011.

== Annual editions ==
Edition	Dates	Venue	Theme	Films shown
1st	30 September – 2 October 2011	The Life House		A History of Independence; AVA; Burning in the Sun; Clouds Over Conakry; Cuba: An African Odyssey; Epilogue; One Small Step; One Way Touareg; Pumzi; Sex, Okra and Salted Butter; Soul Boy; The Lunatic; White Wedding; Ousmane
2nd	28 September – 1 October 2012	British Council, Southern Sun Hotel and Freedom Park	Shine Your Eye	Big Man; Call Me Kuchu; Dr. Cruel; Driving With Fanon; Man on Ground; Stadium Hotel; Yoolé; Where Do I Stand; Saworoide; Our Beloved Sudan; NAIJ, A History of Nigeria
3rd	28 September – 1 October 2013	Wheatbaker, British Council, Southern Sun Hotel, and Freedom Park	Great Migrations	Alaskaland; Black Africa White Marble; Confusion Na Wa; Congolese Dreams; Creation in Exile: Five filmmakers in conversation; Fela! in Lagos; Fincho; Footprints of my Other; Fuelling Poverty; Koukan Kourcia / The Cry of the Turtledoves; La Pirogue; The Marriage Factor; Microphone; Mugabe: Villain or Hero?; Olu Amoda: A Metallic Journey; An Oversimplification of Her Beauty; The Pilot and the Passenger; Pokou Ashanti Princess; RasTa! A Soul's Journey; Rolling Dollar: a Legend Unplugged; The Stuart Hall Project
4th	26 September – 1 October 2014	Federal Palace Hotel	Legacy	Over 30 movies from 14 countries, including: Oya, the Rise of the Orisha; The Supreme Prize; Beleh; Boneshaker; Ududeagu; Legends of Madagascar; Kwaku Ananse; Onunaekwuluora: The Legacy of Professor Thurstan Shaw; B for Boy; Sexy Money; Aya of Yop City; Coz Ov Moni 2; October 1.
5th	30 September – 4 October 2015	Federal Palace Hotel	Future Forward	The Art of Ama Aida Aidoo; Beasts of the Southern Wild; Black Africa White Marble; Beat Girls; The Curse of Medea; Eighteam; Faaji Agba; Finding Fela; Gone Too Far; Horn Free Day; Head Gone; Henna; The Legacy of Rubies; Mr Adams; Nollywood; Olu Amoda: A Metallic Journey; Once; Prey; Saworoide; Sex, Okra and Salted Butter; The Sim; Sobukwe: A Great Soul; Soko Sanko / The Market King; Timbuktu; White Wedding
6th	30 September – 2 October 2016	Federal Palace Hotel	Music Makes the People	Akounak Tedalat Taha Tazoughi; Anton; Biodun Olaku: Nigerian Painter; Cholo; Destino; Gidi Blues; House Of Nwapa; I Shot Bi Kidude; In the Eye of the Spiral; Intore / The Chosen; Lagos: The Birth Of A City Of Style; Miniyamba / Walking Blues; No Good Turn; New York I Love You; Olive; Too Black to be French?; Towards Tenderness; The Amazing Nina Simone; The Other Side of the Atlantic; The Return; The Sense of Touch; Tunde
7th	29 September – 1 October 2017	Federal Palace Hotel	Reset	80; Afia Attack; The Aftermath of the Inauguration of the Public Toilet at Kilometer 375; Akatakpo!!! The Legend of Tony Odili; Bad Market; Bariga Sugar; Borders; A Hotel Called Memory; I Heard it Through The Grapevine; Kalushi; Kanye Kanye; Madama Esther; Omode Meta Nsere; An Opera of the World; A Place for Myself; Shadeism: Digging Deeper; Vaya
8th	28–30 September 2018	Muson Centre	Who Do You Think You Are?	Agwaetiti Obiuto; Asmat; Baby Mamas; Cafe of Dreams; The Delivery Boy; Granma; Hidden Treasures; Ignorance of Blood; Iko Ndu; Kasala!; Lagos: The birth of a city of style 1861-1967; Negritude: A Dialogue Between Wole Soyinka and Senghor; The Lost Cafe; Lucky; Our Africa; Sidi Ilujinie; Town Crier; U ME I; Zerzura
9th	27–29 September 2019	Muson Centre	Tales By Moonlight	About Love; Call Me By My Name; Company Yaya; Daughters of Chibok; A Gender; A Kalabanda Ate My Homework; Land of Gods; My Friend Fela; Ogbu-Oja Eze; Orange City; Ordinary Fellows; The Lost Okoroshi; Wall Flower; Wrong Con; Awon Boyz; Damas Nwoko;
