= Black Africa, White Marble =

- Film poster
- Directed by: Clement Bicocchi
- Written by: Idanna Pucci
- Produced by: Idanna Pucci; Terence Ward
- Starring: Idanna Pucci
- Release date: April 14, 2012 (New York African Film Festival)
- Running time: 77 minutes
- Countries: Italy; United States
- Languages: English, French and Italian

Black Africa, White Marble is a 2012 Italian documentary about Congo-Brazzaville made by Clement Bicocchi.

The documentary is framed around the plans of Sassou Nguesso to transfer the remains of Pierre Savorgnan de Brazza from his grave in Algiers to a $9 million mausoleum in Brazzaville. The documentary follows a visit to Congo by one of Brazza's descendants, the Italian writer Idanna Pucci. Pucci, a niece of Emilio Pucci, highlights the fact that Nguesso's memorial plans do not benefit the people of Congo. Worse, they diminish the status of the current King Makoko, spiritual leader of the Bateke, whose ancestor had signed the pact with Brazza in 1880. In Pucci's words:

I didn't want Brazza, who was a man of peace and who gave his entire fortune to the people of Congo, to be used to marginalize the current King Makoko, who is the revered spiritual leader of the majority tribe... We will give you Brazza, I told [Nguesso], only if you sign a protocol of provisions that benefit the population, You restore the Lycee Savorgnan Brazza school. You build a road to Mbe, where Makoko lives. And you put a statue of the original King Makoko right next to the statue of Brazza at the mausoleum.

The film was shown at the African Film Festival, Inc. in 2012 and 2013. It won the Silver Punt Audience Award for best documentary at the 33rd Cambridge Film Festival. It was also shown at Lights, Camera Africa! 2015.
