= Idanna Pucci =

Italian writer and filmmaker (born 1945)

- Born: Idanna Pucci di Barsento; Castello di Brazzà, Brazzacco, Udine, Italy
- Occupations: Writer, filmmaker
- Spouses: Hugues de Montalembert (m. 1970; div. 1979) Terence Ward (m. 1995)
- Relatives: Cora Slocomb di Brazza (great-grandmother); Pietro Savorgnan di Brazza (great-uncle)
- Writing career
- Language: Italian, English, French

Idanna Pucci (born December 25, 1945) is an Italian writer and documentary filmmaker, and a member of the prominent Pucci family of Florence.

== Early life ==
She moved from Florence to New York City at age nineteen to work for her uncle, the fashion designer Emilio Pucci, at his boutique within the luxury department store Saks Fifth Avenue. In 1970 she and Count Hugues de Montalembert were married in Florence; the couple divorced in 1979.

== Career ==
During the 1970s, Pucci traveled extensively throughout Indonesia, Southeast Asia, Japan, and across the Soviet Union on the Trans-Siberian Railway, an experience she wrote about which was published in The Asia Magazine.

While studying for her degree in Comparative Literature at Columbia University, Pucci received a grant from the Margaret Mead Institute of Intercultural Studies for a project entitled The Prince and the Pauper: Two Balinese Portraits. She went on to complete a book, The Epic of Life: A Balinese Journey of the Soul, about the ceiling paintings of the Kertha Gosa, the court of justice at the former royal Klungkung Palace, Bali, Indonesia.

Her next book, The Trials of Maria Barbella, released in 1996, chronicles the story of a young Italian immigrant who in 1895 was sentenced by the State of New York to be the first woman executed in the newly invented electric chair.

After obtaining the International Diploma in Humanitarian Assistance in Geneva, she served as an electoral officer during the 1999 referendum for independence in East Timor.

Pucci's first film, Eugenia of Patagonia, was a documentary about her great-aunt, who founded a town in remote Patagonia and served as mayor of a vast region in southern Chile for decades. In 2005 it screened at Films de Femmes and Avignon Film Festival in France, and at Festival Cinema Delle Donne in Turin, where it won the Audience Prize for Documentary.

In 2009, Umbrage Editions published her book Brazza in Congo: A Life and Legacy, an illustrated biography of the explorer Pierre Pietro Savorgnan di Brazzà, the eponym of the capital of the Republic of the Congo, Brazzaville, who was known for his pioneering struggle for the rights of Africans in the late 19th century. Along with her husband Terence Ward, whom she married in 1995, Pucci curated simultaneous exhibitions at NYU's Casa Italiana Zerilli-Marimò and the National Arts Club. Pucci and Ward also produced the documentary Black Africa, White Marble, which recounts Pucci's battle against Congolese President Denis Sassou Nguesso over the controversial transfer of Brazza's remains from Algiers to a newly constructed, multi-million dollar mausoleum in Brazzaville. The film premiered at the African Film Festival New York in 2012 and screened around the world, winning the Silver Punt Audience Award for best documentary at the 33rd Cambridge Film Festival, Best Documentary at the Annecy Italian Film Festival and Best Documentary Feature at the Berlin Independent Film Festival.

Pucci and Ward also produced a narrative feature by Sharon Greytak that premiered in 2012, Archaeology of a Woman, which stars Sally Kirkland and Victoria Clark and won a Golden Remi award at WorldFest Houston that year. Their next project was the documentary short Talk Radio Tehran, which follows three high-spirited women who fulfill their aspirations in spite of the gender apartheid system that dominates daily life in Iran.

In 2020, two books by Pucci were released. The World Odyssey of a Balinese Prince is a collection of true stories from the life of Prince Made Djelantik, from his childhood in a royal palace on the island of Bali to his adventures as a medical doctor in far-flung corners of the planet, including Iraq, Somalia, Afghanistan, and Eastern Indonesia. Dr. Djelantik's own watercolors illustrate his life in vivid detail. On March 10, Simon & Schuster published The Lady of Sing Sing: An American Countess, an Italian Immigrant, and Their Epic Battle for Justice in New York's Gilded Age, an expanded and updated edition of Pucci's earlier book about Maria Barbella.

Pucci's next book, co-authored with Ward and released in 2026, was Emilio Pucci: The Astonishing Odyssey of a Fashion Icon, a biography of her uncle spanning his childhood in Florence, athletic pursuits and military service, and previously little-known efforts to help Benito Mussolini's daughter Edda smuggle her husband Galeazzo Ciano's wartime diaries to the Allies.
