= Terence Ward =

Irish-American author/documentary producer (born 1955)

Terence S. Ward
- Born: Terence Sean Ward; July 10, 1955 (age 71); Boulder, Colorado, U.S.
- Occupation: Writer
- Spouse: Idanna Pucci (m. 1995)
- Writing career
- Language: English, Italian, Arabic, Indonesian

Terence S. Ward (born July 10, 1955) is an Irish-American writer and film producer.

== Biography ==
Born in Boulder, Colorado, Ward grew up in Saudi Arabia and then Iran. He studied at the American University in Cairo, concentrating in Islamic political movements, and at the University of California, Berkeley, earning a BA in political science from the latter. He went on to earn an MBA from the International Management Institute (now International Institute for Management Development) in Geneva, Switzerland.

He has been married to the Italian writer Idanna Pucci since 1995, and the couple divide their time between Florence, Italy, and New York.

== Writing career ==
=== Searching for Hassan: An American Family's Journey Home to Iran ===
Searching for Hassan: An American Family's Journey Home to Iran (2002) is Ward's first book and recounts his family's journey back to Iran, after three decades away, in search of their long-lost friend. Ward appeared on Charlie Rose to share the work, and it was reviewed in numerous publications, including the New York Times and Publishers Weekly. It was translated into Italian, French, German, Persian, and Indonesian, and in 2020 an updated edition with the title Searching for Hassan: A Journey to the Heart of Iran was published in two editions, by Simon & Schuster in the US and Ketabsara Tandis in Iran.

=== The Guardian of Mercy: How an Extraordinary Painting by Caravaggio Changed an Ordinary Life Today ===
The Guardian of Mercy: How an Extraordinary Painting by Caravaggio Changed an Ordinary Life Today (2016), is also a true story, told in a double narrative, of Caravaggio in Naples and, four centuries later, the contemporary guardian of the old master's The Seven Acts of Mercy. According to Ingrid D. Rowland of the New York Review of Books, "this unusual and poignant book insists that Caravaggio’s paintings still call upon us to think and act, not just to look on passively, and in laying down this challenge, as Ward argues, the artist extends a compassionate hand to his viewers across the centuries." Publishers Weekly described The Guardian of Mercy as "an eclectic mix of genres: it’s a travel memoir, an art history treatise, and a journalistic sketch of modern-day Naples, and in a five-star review for the San Francisco Book Review, Aron Row called it "a rich tapestry that intricately weaves the story of an iconic painter and his influence on the viewer." At the Vatican, during the Jubilee of Mercy, Ward, along with Cardinal Peter Turkson and Bishop Brian Farrell, presented the new act of mercy proposed by Pope Francis: Caring for Our Common Home, a vision of environmentalism focusing on thoughtful stewardship of the planet.

=== The Wahhabi Code: How the Saudis Spread Extremism Globally ===
The Wahhabi Code: How the Saudis Spread Extremism Globally (2018), examines Saudi Arabia's export of Wahhabism and the rise of jihadi violence across the Islamic world. In conjunction with the book's release, Ward appeared on CNN to discuss with Christiane Amanpour the history of extremist ideology in Saudi Arabia. His writing on the subject has also appeared on CNN.com and in the Los Angeles Times.

=== Emilio Pucci: The Astonishing Odyssey of a Fashion Icon ===
Co-authored with Ward's wife Idanna, Emilio Pucci: The Astonishing Odyssey of a Fashion Icon (2026), spans the famed fashion designer's childhood in Florence, athletic pursuits and military service, and previously little-known efforts to help Benito Mussolini's daughter Edda smuggle her husband Galeazzo Ciano's wartime diaries to the Allies.

== Filmmaking ==
The first film Ward produced, in partnership with his wife Idanna Pucci, was the documentary feature Eugenia of Patagonia, about an ecologist mayor in remote southern Chile. The film screened on the festival circuit throughout Europe, and won several awards including the Audience Award at Turin's Festival Internazionale Cinema delle Donne 2005, and Best Film at CIMAMERICHE, Film Festival del Migrazione in 2009.

Ward and Pucci also produced the documentary Black Africa, White Marble, which tells the story of Pucci's efforts to oppose Congolese President Denis Sassou Nguesso's plan to transfer explorer Pietro Savorgnan di Brazza's remains from Algiers to a new, multi-million-dollar mausoleum in Brazzaville. The film premiered in 2012 at African Film Festival New York and went on to win several awards at film festivals around the world, including the Best Documentary Audience Award at Cambridge Film Festival, Best Documentary at Annecy Italian Film Festival, and Best Documentary Feature at Berlin Independent Film Festival.

A narrative feature produced by Ward and Pucci, Archaeology of a Woman, starring Sally Kirkland and Victoria Clark and directed by Sharon Greytak, premiered in 2012 and won a Golden Remi Award at WorldFest Houston.

Their next project was the documentary short Talk Radio Tehran, which focuses on intrepid women pursuing their ambitions amid Iran's gender apartheid. It won the NYU Florence Best Short Film Award at the 2016 Middle East Now Film Festival in Florence, Italy and aired on the BBC as part of International Women's Day 2018.

== Professional associations ==
Ward is a member of PEN International and Associazione Internazionale di Studi sul Mediterraneo e l'Oriente (ISMEO). He also serves as ambassador for Religions for Peace, the world's largest inter-religious movement.

== Bibliography ==
- Searching for Hassan: An American Family's Journey Home to Iran (Houghton Mifflin Harcourt, 2002) ISBN 978-0618048441
- The Guardian of Mercy: How an Extraordinary Painting by Caravaggio Changed an Ordinary Life Today (Arcade Publishing, 2016) ISBN 978-1628725926
- The Wahhabi Code: How the Saudis Spread Extremism Globally (Arcade Publishing, 2018) ISBN 978-1628729719
- Searching for Hassan: A Journey to the Heart of Iran (Tiller Press, 2020) ISBN 9781982142773

== Filmography ==
As producer:

- Eugenia of Patagonia (2004)
- Black Africa, White Marble (2012)
- Archaeology of a Woman (2012)
- Talk Radio Tehran (short) (2015)
