= Gary Tarn =

British filmmaker and composer (born 1962)

- Occupations: director and composer
- Years active: 1985 – present
- Notable work: Black Sun; The Prophet 2011
- Awards: 2007 Nominated "BAFTA"; 2006 "Copenhagen International Documentary Film Festival"; 2006 "Newport International Film Festival"; 2006 "Sarasota Film Festival"; 2005 Nominated "British Independent Film Awards”
- Website: www.garytarn.com

Gary Tarn (born 1962) is a British filmmaker and composer.

== Biography ==
Gary Tarn was a member of the band Drum Theatre, which topped the European charts in 1985 with "Eldorado". They released one album "Everyman", which was re-released by Cherry Red Records, in 2014. For several years he created soundtracks for commercials, and short films, including the Brothers Quay's short The Phantom Museum.

Black Sun (2005) was Tarn's debut film. He shot, edited, scored, produced and directed the film, which was executive produced by Alfonso Cuarón and produced by John Battsek. It was based on the best selling book Eclipse by the artist and filmmaker, Hugues de Montalembert, who was permanently blinded in 1978. It is also narrated by de Montalembert. Released in 2005, the film won a number of International Awards and was nominated for The Carl Foreman Award for Special Achievement by a British Director in their First Feature Film at the 2007 BAFTA 60th British Academy Film Awards. The film screened on the BBC and HBO in 2007 and was number 12 in Tim Robey's top 100 films of the decade.

In 2007 Tarn was cinematographer for Alfonso Cuaron's The Possibility of Hope shot on the set of Children of Men.

In 2011, Tarn released his feature adaptation of Kahlil Gibran's 1923 book The Prophet with narration by Thandie Newton. The Prophet switches between digital and 16mm film and is presented as a series of brief sequences mirroring the book's structure. It was shot in Belgrade, New Bedford, London, New York City, Milan and Lebanon. The Prophet opened at Copenhagen International Documentary Festival in 2011 and was an official selection at Hot Docs Canadian International Documentary Festival, DOXA Documentary Film Festival and Magnificent 7 festival.

== Awards ==
- 2007 BAFTA / Nominated for Best Debut Film
- 2006 Copenhagen International Documentary Film Festival / Grand Prix Winner
- 2006 Newport International Film Festival / Jury Award Winner
- 2006 Sarasota Film Festival / Special Jury Prize
- 2005 British Independent Film Awards / Nominated for Best Documentary
- Official Selection in 2005 and 2006 at the London Film Festival/ 2005 Toronto International Film Festival /Tribeca Film Festival /Miami International Film Festival
- Official Selection in 2011 at the Copenhagen International Documentary Festival/ Hot Docs Canadian International Documentary Festival/ DOXA Documentary Film Festival/ Magnificent 7 festival
