= Drum Theatre =

Drum Theatre may refer to:

- Drum Theatre (musical group), a 1980s British pop group
- Drum Theatre (Plymouth), a theatre in Plymouth, England
