= Dreaming of Denmark =

- Directed by: Michael Graversen
- Produced by: Lise Saxtrup
- Distributed by: Autlook Filmsales
- Release date: 5 November 2015 (CPH:DOX)
- Running time: 62 minutes
- Country: Denmark

Dreaming of Denmark is a documentary film by director Michael Graversen that investigates what happens to one of the many unaccompanied minor refugees who disappear in Europe. The film was released at the peak of the refugee crisis in Europe in 2015/16.

== Synopsis ==
Director Michael Graversen’s film investigates what happens to one of the many unaccompanied minor refugees who disappear in Europe after their asylum claim is rejected. Over the course of four years the director follows the faith of the young afghan Wasiullah from the careless days at the children's asylum centre in Denmark to the illegal life through Europe where Wasi ends up in a homeless existence in Italy. The dream of one day returning to Denmark is what keeps Wasi going until he breaks down in the end and loses his memory.

== Reception and impact ==
Dreaming of Denmark premiered at CPH:DOX and was nominated for a F:ACT Award. It was broadcast in a primetime slot on Danish national TV DR1.

After the release in Denmark the film hit the headlines in danish media and sparked debate about the conditions of the unaccompanied minor refugees in Denmark. The director Michael Graversen has since regularly appeared in the public debate in Denmark advocating for the rights of young and child refugees as well as traveling internationally with the film speaking about its subject to the press and participating in debate panels.

Danish film magazine EKKO wrote in a review of the film: "What is at stake in the portrait, is the human consequences of a youth growing up as a shadow existence with nothing to cling on to than the hope to be let. Wasis Sisyphean existence is a profound input in the refugee debate and Dreaming of Denmark is something as rare as an important film.".

The film has been selected to several international film festivals and won the Amnesty Award at Giffoni International Film Festival. Huffington Post wrote after the Greek premiere at Thessaloniki Documentary Festival where the film was a part of a highlighted segment focusing on films about the refugees crisis: "My favorite was Michael Graversen’s Dreaming of Denmark, which directly puts you in the shoes of an Afghan teenager who, unable to get residency in Denmark and afraid to be deported, leaves Denmark with nothing on his back to find a new life in Italy".

When the film was screened on the national Austrian broadcasting channel ORF it was followed by an hour long debate about human rights and ABC News interviewed the director focusing on the plight of children seeking asylum.

In 2016 the director was awarded the Salaam Film Prize 2016 for his work filming the unaccompanied minors in Denmark not only in Dreaming of Denmark but also in the predecessor No Man's Land (2013) set before the refugee crisis.

Not all the reactions towards the film has been positive. After the TV broadcast in Denmark the director participated in a chat at the newspaper Ekstra Bladet's website. Some users took offence of the directors portrayal of a refugee. The broadcast was two days after one of the terrorist attacks in Paris and some users meant that the director had the blood of the victims on his hands making an emphatic film about a refugee as refugees could also be terrorists.

== Festivals and awards ==
- Amnesty Award, Giffoni International Film Festival
- 2. prize Best Documentary, Giffoni International Film Festival
- Lübeck, Nordische Filmtage
- Japan Prize, International Educational Program Contest
- Helsinki International Film Festival
- Thessaloniki Documentary Festival
- Bucharest One World, Romania
- Document Human Rights Film Festival, Glasgow
- Human Rights & Arts Film Festival, Melbourne
- BUFF International Children's Film festival, Malmø
- Human Rights Watch Film Festival, Amsterdam
- Salaam Film Prize 2016
- CPH:DOX, F:ACT Award nominee
