= Laila Haidari =

Afghan human rights activist (b. 1978)

- Born: 1978 (age 47–48); Quetta, Pakistan
- Education: Degree in filmmaking
- Occupations: Activist; Restaurateur
- Years active: 2010–present
- Known for: Founder of Mother Camp; Owner of Taj Begum; Subject of Laila at the Bridge
- Children: 3
- Awards: BBC's 100 Women (2021)

Laila Haidari (born 1978) is an Afghan activist and restaurateur. She runs Mother Camp, a drug rehabilitation centre she founded in Kabul, Afghanistan, in 2010. She also owns Taj Begum, a Kabul cafe that funds Mother Camp. Taj Begum is frequently raided because it breaks taboos; the cafe is run by a woman and allows unmarried men and women to eat together. Haidari is the subject of the 2018 documentary film Laila at the Bridge. She was recognized as one of the BBC's 100 women of 2021.

== Biography ==
=== Early life, marriage, and education ===
Haidari was born to an Afghan family in Quetta, Pakistan, in 1978. While an infant, her family moved to Iran as refugees. A child bride, Haidari was married at age 12 to a mullah in his thirties. She had her first child at age 13. The couple had three children in total.

When her husband permitted her to take religious classes, Haidari secretly began studying other subjects. She earned a university degree in filmmaking.

Haidari divorced her husband when she was 21 years old. Per Islamic law, the children remained with their father.

=== Career and activism ===
Haidari moved to Afghanistan in 2009. In Kabul, she found her brother, Hakim, living under Pul-e-Sokhta bridge with hundreds of other drug-addicted individuals. Motivated by her brother's condition, the growing drug problem in Afghanistan, and the dearth of government-run shelters for addicts, Haidari established a drug rehabilitation centre in 2010. The centre was named Mother Camp by its first clients. Mother Camp does not receive government funds or foreign aid. It is the city's only private drug rehabilitation centre.

In 2011, Haidari opened a restaurant, Taj Begum, in Kabul, in order to fund Mother Camp. The restaurant has been noted for being woman-run, a rarity in Afghanistan, and for providing a space in which married and unmarried men and women can socialize together, a cultural taboo in the local community. The restaurant employs individuals who lived at Mother Camp. Haidari's restaurant has been raided by the police on multiple occasions, reportedly because men and women dine together in the space, because Haidari does not always wear a head scarf, and because she is a woman entrepreneur.

Haidari has spoken out against the Taliban's presence in Afghanistan, including the threats it presents to women's rights in the country. She has criticized the Afghan government for not including women in the peace process for the ongoing war in Afghanistan.

In 2019, Haidari was an invited speaker at the Oslo Freedom Forum, hosted by the Human Rights Foundation.

She was recognized as one of the BBC's 100 women of 2021.

== Laila at the Bridge ==
Haidari is the subject of a documentary, Laila at the Bridge, directed by Elizabeth and Gulistan Mirzaei. The film won the FACT:Award for investigative documentaries at Copenhagen's CPH:DOX film festival in 2018. It also won the Social Justice Award for Documentary Film at the 34th annual Santa Barbara International Film Festival.
