= Michael Graversen =

Danish documentary filmmaker (born 1980)

- Born: 27 August 1980 (age 46); Tønder, Denmark
- Education: National Film and Television School
- Occupation: Filmmaker
- Website: www.michaelgraversen.com

Michael Graversen (born 27 August 1980) is a Danish documentary filmmaker. He graduated from the National Film and Television School in England and directs documentaries often of an existential or socially-relevant character. His work has won awards and been selected for festivals including IDFA and CPH:DOX.

== Biography ==
In 2015, Michael Graversen directed Dreaming of Denmark. For over three years, the director followed the underground life of the Afghan boy Wasiullah – one of the many unaccompanied refugee children that disappear in Europe after they receive a rejection on their asylum claim. The film was nominated for a F:ACT Award at CPH:DOX and was broadcast in prime time at DR1. Subsequently, the film has toured international festivals, TV and won awards – most recently the Amnesty International Award at Giffoni International Film Festival.

In 2013, Michael Graversen directed the predecessor No Man's land. The film is a portrait of an asylum center in Jægerspris for unaccompanied minor refugees and was selected for numerous festivals including IDFA.

Dreaming of Denmark premiered at the peak of the refugee crisis in Europe and the director has regularly appeared in Danish and international media advocating for the rights of refugees and in particular the unaccompanied minors. Michael Graversen was one of the first to make films about and document the lives of the unaccompanied refugee children in Europe. In 2016 he received the Salaam Film Prize 2016 as a result of his work.

In 2012, Michael Graversen directed The Last Night Shift about women keeping lone dying people company in their final hours. The director has also worked with experimental and poetic film as An Anxious Mind (selected for Australian Experimental Film Festival) which is about Michael Graversen's own experience of having been affected by childhood cancer. Michael Graversen's first film was Toxic Ground about a pollution scandal in his hometown Grindsted. Toxic Ground aired on DR2 and was selected for CPH:DOX and created a lot of debate. Subsequently, a public meeting in Grindsted was held and a bill was presented in Danish parliament.

== Filmography ==
- Dreaming of Denmark (2015)
- No Man’s Land (2013)
- The Last Night Shift (2012)
- An Anxious Mind (2012)
- The Pact (2011)
- Toxic Ground (2006)

== Awards and selection of festivals ==
- IDFA, official selection
- CPH:DOX, nominated for F:ACT Award
- Amnesty International Award, Giffoni International Film Festival
- Best Documentary 2nd prize, Giffoni International Film Festival
- Freestyle Award at Mo&Friese International Children’s Film Festival
- Helsinki International Film Festival
- Thessaloniki Documentary Festival
- Human Rights Watch Film Festival, Amsterdam
- Nordische Filmtage, Lübeck,
- Japan Prize, International Educational Program Contest
- One World, Romania
- Human Rights & Arts Film Festival, Melbourne
- Salaam Film Prize 2016
- Olympia International Film Festival
- Uppsala International Short Film Festival
- Belo Horizonte International Short Film Festival
- World Film Festival, Estonia
- Watch Docs International Human Rights Film Festival
- Document Human Rights Film Festival, Glasgow
- BUFF International Children's Film festival, Malmø
