= Katrine Philp =

Danish film director (born 1978)

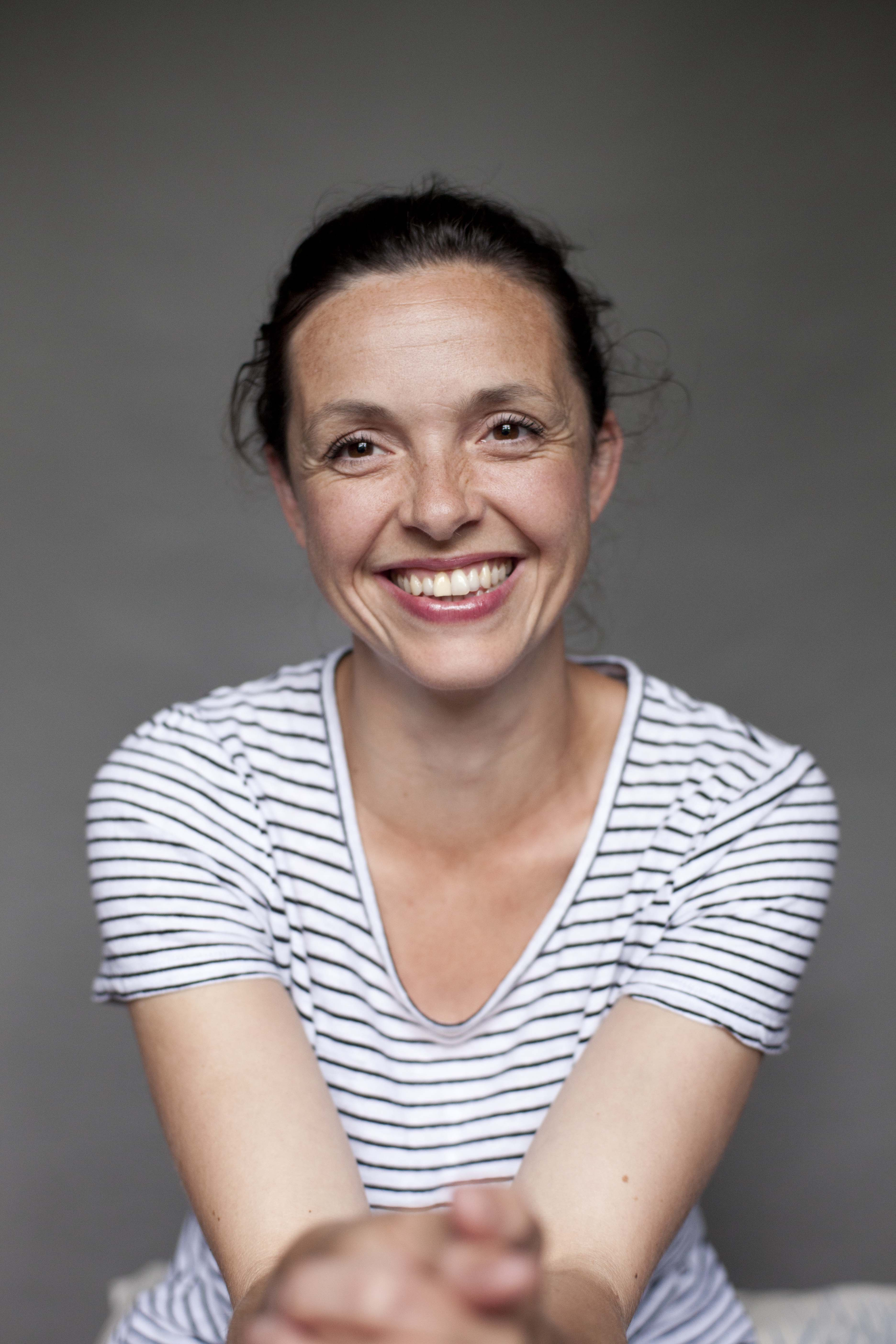
- Born: December 14, 1978 (age 47)
- Education: National Film School of Denmark
- Occupation: Film director

Katrine Philp (born December 14, 1978) is a Danish film director. She initially studied film production design at the Royal Danish Academy of Fine Arts and later graduated from the National Film School of Denmark as a documentary film director in 2009.

== Career ==
Philp started her career in 2009 with her graduation film Book of Miri. The film was selected for the IDFA Student Competition and won the European Young CIVIS Media award in Germany.

Philp is a former dancer. After being invited to a ballroom training session, she met with dancers who would become the protagonists of her first feature documentary Dance For Me in 2013. The film was nominated at the 2015 Emmy Awards in the category ‘Outstanding Arts and Culture Programming’.

In 2018, Philp directed False Confessions. The film focuses on the defence lawyer Jane Fisher-Byrialsen, who works on false confessions cases in USA, including the ones of Korey Wise, Malthe Thomsen and Renay Lynch. Due to interrogation techniques that use brutal psychological manipulation, including lying about evidence, to secure a confession, they have falsely confessed to crimes they didn't commit. The film won the Special Jury Award for Excellence in Social Justice at Los Angeles Film Festival in 2018.

Philp directed in 2020 the documentary Beautiful Something Left Behind, which follows young children during a period of their grief, as they just lost one or both parents.

The film was previously called An Elephant in the Room and was part of the main competition in the 2020 SXSW Film Festival under this title. Although the festival was cancelled due to the COVID-19 pandemic, the competition took place and Philp won the Grand Jury Prize for Best Documentary.

== Personal life ==
Philp is married to the director of photographer Adam Morris Philp with whom she has made several films, including Beautiful Something Left Behind. For this film, they spent a year following the kids and moved their children in New Jersey for the filming. During this period, Philp's dad died unexpectedly and she dedicated the film to her father.

== Filmography ==
- Beautiful Something Left Behind (also known as An Elephant in the Room) (2020)
- False Confessions (2018)
- Home Sweet Home (2015)
- Dance For Me (2013)
- Suitable (2013)
- Book of Miri (2009)

== Awards ==
Film	Year	Category	Film Festival
Beautiful Something Left Behind (also known as An Elephant in the Room)	2020	Winner Grand Jury Award – Documentary Feature	SXSW
Beautiful Something Left Behind (also known as An Elephant in the Room)	2020	The Unicef Prize	Japan Prize
Beautiful Something Left Behind (also known as An Elephant in the Room)	2020	Honourable Mention	Nordische Filmtage Lübeck
False Confessions	2018	Winner Politiken's Audience Award	CPH:DOX
False Confessions	2018	Winner Special Jury Award for Excellence in Social Justice	Los Angeles Film Festival
False Confessions	2018	Nomination Best Documentary Feature	Los Angeles Film Festival
False Confessions	2018	Audience Award	Kaliningrad International Film Festival "One the Edge: West"
Home Sweet Home	2016	Winner Best Short Documentary	Danish Film Awards (Robert)
Home Sweet Home	2015	Nomination in the Competition for Kids & Docs	IDFA
Dance For Me	2015	Nomination in the category 'Outstanding Arts and Culture Programming'	Emmy Award
Dance For Me	2013	Winner Audience Choice Award	American Documentary Film Festival and Film Fund
Dance For Me	2012	Nomination Sonic Dox Award	CPH:DOX
Dance For Me	2012	Nomination in the competition for First Appearance	IDFA
Book of Miri	2014	Nomination Best Documentary	Ekko Shortlist Awards
Book of Miri	2010	Winner President's Award	Full Frame Documentary Film Festival
Book of Miri	2010	Winner European Young CIVIS Media Prize	CIVIS Media Prize
Book of Miri	2009	Nomination for Best Student Award	IDFA
