= Voices of Bam =

Voices of Bam (Stemmen van Bam)
- Directed by: Aliona van der Horst & Massja Ooms
- Written by: Aliona van der Horst
- Produced by: Zeppers Film & NPS
- Cinematography: Niklas Karpaty
- Edited by: Stefan Kamp
- Release date: 2006
- Running time: 90 min.
- Country: Netherlands
- Languages: Persian; English; Dutch

Voices of Bam (Dutch: Stemmen van Bam / Persian: صداهای بم) is a 2006 Dutch-made documentary feature film about 2003 Bam earthquake. The film was produced and directed by Dutch filmmakers Aliona van der Horst.

The film is inspired by photographs that were recovered from the town's debris, the only tangible mementoes left of life before the earthquake.

== See also ==
- Bam 6.6
