= Archaeology of a Woman =

- Directed by: Sharon Greytak
- Written by: Sharon Greytak
- Produced by: Idanna Pucci; Terence Ward
- Starring: Sally Kirkland; Victoria Clark
- Release date: April 21, 2012 (Houston WorldFest)
- Running time: 94 minutes
- Country: United States
- Language: English

Archaeology of a Woman is an American mystery film written and directed by Sharon Greytak and starring Sally Kirkland and Victoria Clark. It released in 2012 and premiered at the WorldFest-Houston International Film Festival, winning an award at the festival. Despite this, the film received mixed reviews from critics.

== Plot ==
Kate (Victoria Clark), a chef, returns to her hometown to care for her mother Margaret (Sally Kirkland), a former journalist suffering from the early stages of dementia. Margaret forgets things and gets lost in places. What Margaret forgets is not revealed to the audience, with information being learned alongside Kate. Margaret goes missing, which unfolds into a generations-old mystery. The film concludes indefinitively. There is also a love interest for Kate, in John, a police officer.

== Cast ==
Adopted from Slate.

- Victoria Clark as Kate
- Alex Emanuel
- Karl Geary as Officer John
- Sally Kirkland as Margaret
- James Murtaugh
- Mary Testa

== Production, release and reception ==
Archeology of a Woman was directed and written by Sharon Greytak, and is produced by Idanna Pucci and Terence Ward. It released in 2012, premiering at the WorldFest-Houston International Film Festival and winning a Golden Remi. In 2014, it received a weeklong theatrical release.

Archeology of a Woman received mixed reviews from critics. Dan Callahan of RogerEbert.com rated the film 1.5/4 stars, and criticized its pacing and writing, though complimented Kirkland's performance. The Hollywood Reporter called it "amateurishly made". Charles Solomon of the Los Angeles Times described its plot as "too-convenient", and its dialogue as "stilted". Wes Greene of Slate rated it 1/4 stars and cited Greytak's directing as the cause of the film's problems. Jeannette Catsoulis of The New York Times wrote that the film does not make sense.
