= The Men's Room (film) =

Norwegian documentary film

- Official poster
- Norwegian: For vi er gutta
- Directed by: Petter Sommer; Jo Vemund Svendsen
- Written by: Petter Sommer; Jo Vemund Svendsen
- Produced by: Fuglene AS
- Starring: Ivar Krogh Hovd; Mannskoret; Gunnar Martinsen; Svein Bjørge; Geir Schau; Knut Akselsen; Prepple Houmb; Ivar Nergaard
- Edited by: Petter Sommer; Jo Vemund Svendsen
- Music by: Martin Horntveth
- Distributed by: Wide House (FR)
- Release date: September 28, 2018
- Running time: 74 minutes
- Country: Norway
- Language: Norwegian

The Men's Room (Norwegian: For vi er gutta, lit. 'Because we're the guys') is a 2018 Norwegian documentary film written and directed by Peter Sommer and Jo Vemund Svendson. It concerns 25 Norwegian men in a men's choir rehearsing for their biggest event ever: warming up for Black Sabbath in front of 10,000 people. However, backstage issues arise as Ivar, the conductor, is terminally ill and may not survive to witness the concert.

The film has won international awards after its release. The international premiere was at CPH:DOX in Copenhagen 24 March 2019 where it won the NORDIC:DOX AWARD for best Nordic documentary film.

The Norwegian title is "For vi er gutta" (Because we're the guys) and is distributed through Norsk Film Distribusjon. In Denmark, the film had its theatrical release on 17 October 2019 under the name "Mandskoret" (The men's choir) and is distributed by Camera film.

== Production ==
The documentary format used is a mixture of interviews and "fly on the wall" coverage that includes a number of musical recitations. The focus is on the choir members themselves and does not delve too deeply into their private family life.

== Critical reception ==
In her review for Norwegian film magazine Kinomagasinest, Torunn Sala gave The Men's Room five stars from six, praising the direction and production as natural, unobtrusive and successfully capturing compassion and humour. Meredith Taylor, reviewing for Filmuphoria, praised the lack of sentimentality, the quiet humour and emotional expression. She commented that the film:" ... glows with a low key charm so redolent of its North European origins ... ". Clare Martin of Radio 13 New Zealand praised the film's naturalism while desiring a more detailed conclusion. She noted that: " ... Without needing to add in quirky camera angles or extreme close-ups, there is clarity and storytelling in every frame...".

== Awards and nominations ==
- «Best European Documentary», 10. Odesa International Film Festival (2019)
- «Best Documentary», Moscow International Film Festival (2019)
- «NORDIC:DOX AWARD» for Best Nordic Documentary, Copenhagen International Documentary Festival (2019)
- «Czech Television Award», 56. Golden Prague International Television Festival (2019)
- «Best Norwegian Documentary», Bergen International Film Festival (2018)
- «Audience award», 59. Krakow Film Festival (2019)
- «Audience award» and «Best Long Documentary», The Norwegian Documentary Film Festival (2019)
- «Special Jury Award», Nordic/Docs (2019)
- «Honorable mention», HUMAN International Documentary Film Festival (2019)
- «Best documentary film» (Nominated), The Amanda Awards (2019)
