= Lin Utzon =

Danish designer

Lin Utzon (born 21 May 1946) is a Danish designer who has created a wide variety of abstract decorative works from textiles to ceramics both in Denmark and abroad.

== Personal life and education ==
Born on 21 May 1946 in the Frederiksberg district of Copenhagen, Utzon spent her childhood in Hellebæk, Denmark. When she was 15, she moved with her family to Australia where her father, architect Jørn Utzon, was to embark on the construction of the Sydney Opera House. After attending classes in painting and sculpture at East Sydney Technical College in Sydney, Australia (1967–1969), she studied textile arts at Copenhagen's School of Arts and Crafts (1967–1970).

When she was 19, after disputes over the opera house, she and her family left Australia at short notice in April 1966. Back in Denmark, she married the architect Alex Popov who had worked with her father in Australia. The couple had two children in the early 1970s, Naja and Mika. After an early divorce, the children mainly lived with Utzon in her Danish home.

== Artistic work ==
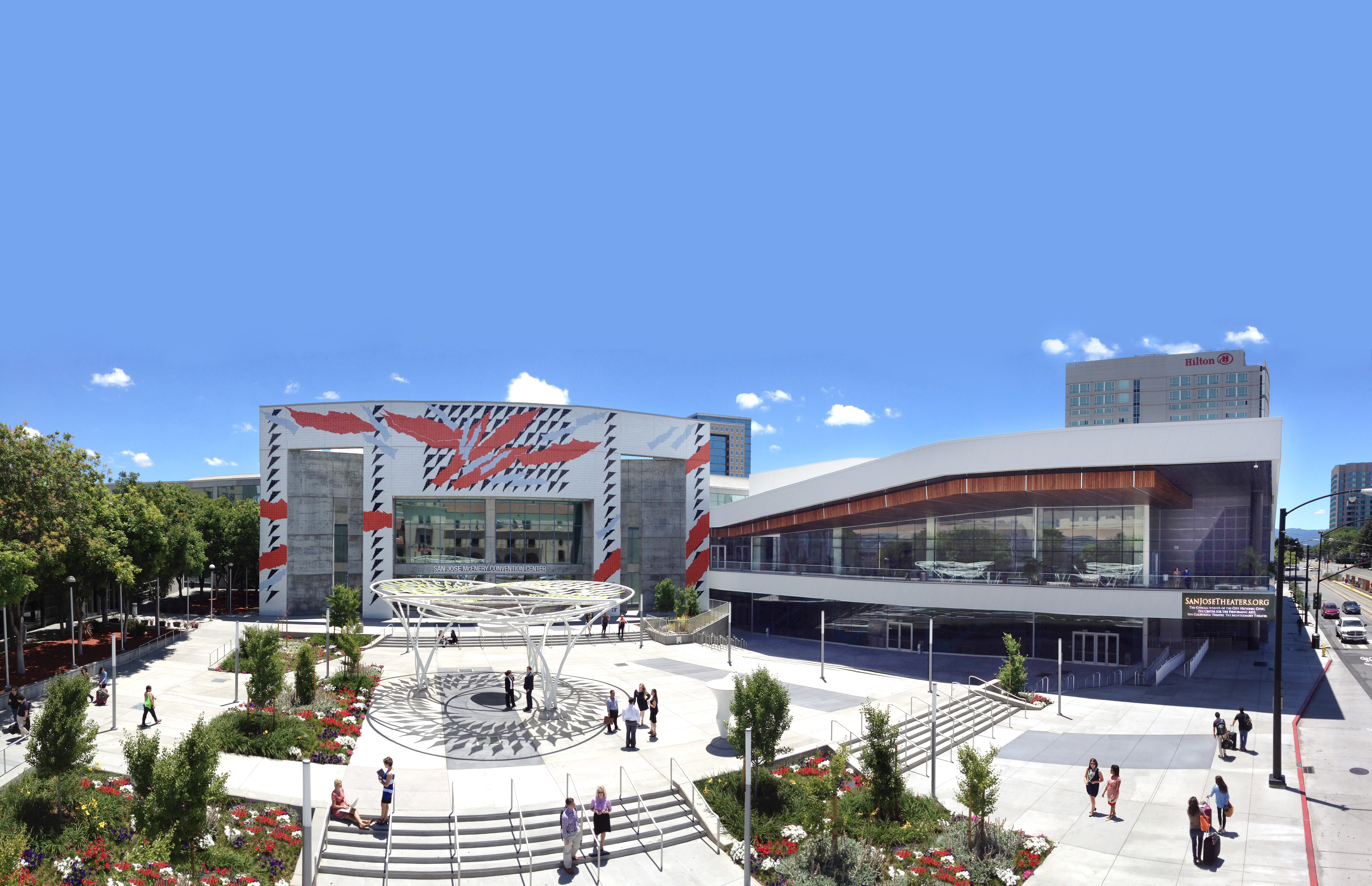
San Jose Convention Center

Utzon's early creations included brightly coloured textiles for Bagsværd Church (1975–1977). In the mid-1980s, she spent three years decorating the new Volvo headquarters in Gothenburg, Sweden, with a 36-metre wall and a 16-metre tapestry. In 1988, she completed a large red, white and black mural at the San Jose Convention Center resembling a flock of birds in flight. She has since decorated walls in the library of the Royal Veterinary and Agricultural College in Frederiksberg, and has added ceramic reliefs to the Finger B extension of Copenhagen Airport. Her creations have also included costumes and scenery for the Royal Danish Ballet.

Since the early 1990s, Utzon has been married to the blind French writer Hugues de Montalembert. The couple spend their time between Denmark, Paris and Can Feliz, the house on the island of Mallorca Utzon inherited from her father.
