= ID Sniper rifle =

Fictional hoax weapon

The ID Sniper rifle is an art project, a fictional, hoax weapon devised by artist Jakob S. Boeskov and industrial designer Kristian von Bengtson. The rifle supposedly shoots GPS chips, and the police force may tag persons with this rifle for later easy retrieval. It was produced by the fictional company Empire North.

According to its specs, "It will feel like a mosquito-bite lasting a fraction of a second. At the same time a digital camcorder with a zoom-lens fitted within the scope will take a high-resolution picture of the target. This picture will be stored on a memory card for later image-analysis."

The hoax was fictionalized in the 2010 film by Boeskov, Empire North.

== Unveiling ==
The design was presented in 2002 in Beijing at the China Police exhibition. Boeskov created an artistic project, "My Doomsday Weapon", a travelling exhibition of the ID Sniper rifle, in which he humorously describes his "infiltration" of China police. Boeskov says that a Chinese company offered venture capital and a location for manufacturing.

The news about the weapon was spread over the internet. When the news was "slashdotted", the Empire North website was hit with about 1.6 million viewers. Even Computerworld was hoaxed although they quickly withdrew the report.

Engadget published a brief comment about the hoax, together with a picture of the "weapon" shortly after the Computerworld article was released. Nevertheless, on March 7, 2007, Engadget posted further images and news of the "weapon" under the title "ID Sniper Rifle fires GPS tracking chip into unwitting humans" despite having denounced it as a hoax three years before.

On August 31, 2013, The Sydney Morning Herald reported that the ID Sniper Rifle had been referred to in a 2011 police paper titled "Microchipping of human subjects as a productivity enhancement and as a strategic management direction of NSW Police".
