= Empire North (film) =

- Release date: 2010
- Country: Denmark

Empire North is a 2010 film written and directed by Jakob Boeskov. The film follows Jakob Valdason (played by Jakob Boeskov) a cartoonist whose life changes drastically when he invents a fictional hi-tech weapon called the ID Sniper. The film is partly based upon the story of ID Sniper. The ID Sniper was an art project that took place in Copenhagen and Beijing August 2002.

== Fictional elements ==
Although Empire North contains documentary elements, it is a fiction film, filmed in studios with professional actors. Honey Hollmann (the daughter of Jack Nicholson), plays the girlfriend of the main character. In the film the weapons fair takes place in Qatar. In real life it took place in Beijing.

== Documentary elements ==
The film contains several documentary elements:

• Real footage of Jakob Boeskov at a weapons fair in Qatar

• Real emails and business offers from a range of international weapons dealers

• The real co-inventor of the ID Sniper, Kristian Von Bengtson plays himself in the film

== Awards ==
The film won the DANISH:DOX ^award at the 2010 CPH:DOX film festival.

== Misc. ==
Empire North has music by Sort Sol, Goodiepal, Timothy DeWit and Mads Heldtberg

== Literary references. ==
The film contains several literary references. Among them are references to: Vladimir Nabokov's Pale Fire, Klaus Mann's Mephisto, Guy Debord's The Society Of The Spectacle.
