= Songs of Repression =

- Film poster
- Directed by: Estephan Wagner; Marianne Hougen-Moraga
- Produced by: Signe Byrge Sørensen; Heidi Elise Christensen
- Release date: 18 March 2020 (CPH:DOX)
- Running time: 90 minutes
- Countries: Chile; Denmark; Netherlands
- Languages: German; Spanish

Songs of Repression is a 2020 internationally co-produced documentary film about the German colony Colonia Dignidad in Chile. The film premiered at 2020 the Copenhagen International Documentary Festival, where it won the Politiken:Danish:Dox Award and the CPH:DOX Award.
