= Jakob S. Boeskov =

Danish artist

- Born: 23 March 1973 (age 53); Elsinore, Denmark
- Known for: Conceptual art, film and music.

Jakob S. Boeskov is an artist, author and award-winning filmmaker based in New York. His work has been shown in museums such as New Museum and Stedelijk Museum. He is best known for infiltrating a Chinese weapons fair with his ID Sniper project.

== ID Sniper rifle ==
In 2002, Boeskov and industrial designer Kristian von Bengtson created a fake hi-tech weapon called the ID Sniper rifle. This fictive weapon could shoot off GPS chips into demonstrators so that the police later could locate them and "apply the punishment." Boeskov brought drawings of this weapon to a weapons fair in Beijing, China, where the weapon received positive reactions from real weapons dealers, politicians and policemen. Boeskov described the project "like being a sci-fi writer caught in his own novel" The project received much press and caused Boeskov to receive purchase orders from various security agencies from around the world.

== Other work ==
In 2009 Boeskov wrote and directed the film Empire North which won the 2010 Danish:DOX Award at the CPH:DOX film festival. In 2010 Boeskov collaborated with Creative Time in New York with a video created in Nigeria together with director Teco Benson. In 2025 Boeskov published the novel Wild Victim Unit.

== Bibliography ==
=== Fiction ===
- Wild Victim Unit (Synth Books, 2025)

=== Non-Fiction ===
- ID Sniper (A-Mock Book, 2015)
- Face Jager (A-Mock Book, 2016)

== Filmography ==
- Empire North (Interpretation Productions, 2010)
- Roy Camera (Ada Lauder Films, 2022)

== Discography ==
- Symbolic And Real Police (2017, S.I. Records)
- Lord Algorithm (2022, TapeLore)
- I Think I Scan EP (2012, w. Timothy DeWit of Gang Gang Dance, Pork Salad Press)
