= Koukan Kourcia =

- Directed by: Sani Elhadj Magori
- Screenplay by: Sani Elhadj Magori
- Produced by: SMAC MAGGIA Images
- Cinematography: Jean-François Hautin
- Edited by: Guillaume Favreau
- Release date: 2010
- Running time: 62 minutes
- Countries: France; Niger

Koukan Kourcia is a 2010 documentary film.

== Synopsis ==
The film portrays the voyage, from Niger to the Ivory Coast, of Hussey, an ageing Nigerian singer, and Sani Elhadj Magori, the director. He has asked Hussey to accompany him to the Ivory Coast to convince his father to return to his village. In the seventies, Hussey was a very well known singer and had the power to persuade young people to emigrate and try to make their fortune on the coasts of West Africa. Many young Nigerians, like the director's father, left never to come back. What sort of power does Hussey still have over the souls of men?

== Awards ==
- Fespaco 2011
- Milan 2011
