= Hugues de Montalembert =

French writer, painter and filmmaker

Hugues de Montalembert (born 1943), is a French writer, painter, and documentary filmmaker, who lost his sight in a New York apartment burglary in 1978. He continued being an artist but switched from painting primarily to sculpture.

== Biography ==
Hugues de Montalembert was born as the third of seven children into an aristocratic officer family from Normandy. His father Pierre Marie Charles François de Montalembert (1914–2009) was a retired Colonel of the French Army, and his mother Yolande FitzGerald (1916–2011) came from Ireland. Hugues de Montalembert grew up on the family estate, which has been family-owned for 300 years. He is the older brother of actor Thibault de Montalembert.

In Paris, he studied law, but left the university without a diploma in 1968. Instead of pursuing a career in the military or banking sector as expected, he went to New York. In January 1970 he married the writer Idanna Pucci di Barsento in Florence. The couple lived in Bali for two years before separating in 1974, and divorcing in 1979. In 1976 de Montalembert returned to New York from Benin, where he worked on a TV documentary on traditional African religion. On his travels, he made documentary films, including some about the dancers Rudolf Nureyev and Margot Fonteyn, as well as about war swords in Vietnam. He also occasionally sold some of his paintings.

On 26 May 1978 he encountered two burglars at his New York apartment in Greenwich Village. After one of the perpetrators sprayed solvent into his eyes during the attack, he became completely blind. He spent three months at St. Vincent's Hospital, where a corneal transplant was made in vain, and another ten months at the Rehabilitation Center for the Blind of the New York Association for the Blind Lighthouse in Manhattan, where he underwent mobility training, life skills education, and learned Braille to restore his independence. He also learned to play piano during this time. A year and a half later, he traveled alone for the first time, first to Indonesia, then to China, the north of Greenland, and on to the Himalayas in 1984.

He published several books, of which À perte de vue was awarded the Prix Ève Delacroix of the Académie française in 1991. His story became the basis of the documentary film Black Sun, written by de Montalembert himself. In his memoirs The meaning of life is life, he describes the process of blindness and his efforts to regain his independence. He described several trips to Indonesia and India, and his inner perception of the world. After his blindness, he also conceived a ballet at the Grand Theatre, Warsaw.

He has been living with the Danish artist Lin Utzon, daughter of architect Jørn Utzon, since 1992. The couple live in Paris, Denmark, and Mallorca.

== Works ==
- 1983: La Lumière assassinée, ISBN 3-7263-6498-6
- 1985: Eclipse: A Nightmare
- 1988: Buio
- 1991: À perte de vue, Prix Ève Delacroix of the Académie française
- 2006: Eclipse
- 2006: Black Sun
- 2010: Invisible: A Memoir, ISBN 978-3-8321-9645-5
- 2011: Regarder au-delà
