= Deming Chen =

American businesswoman

Ming Chen
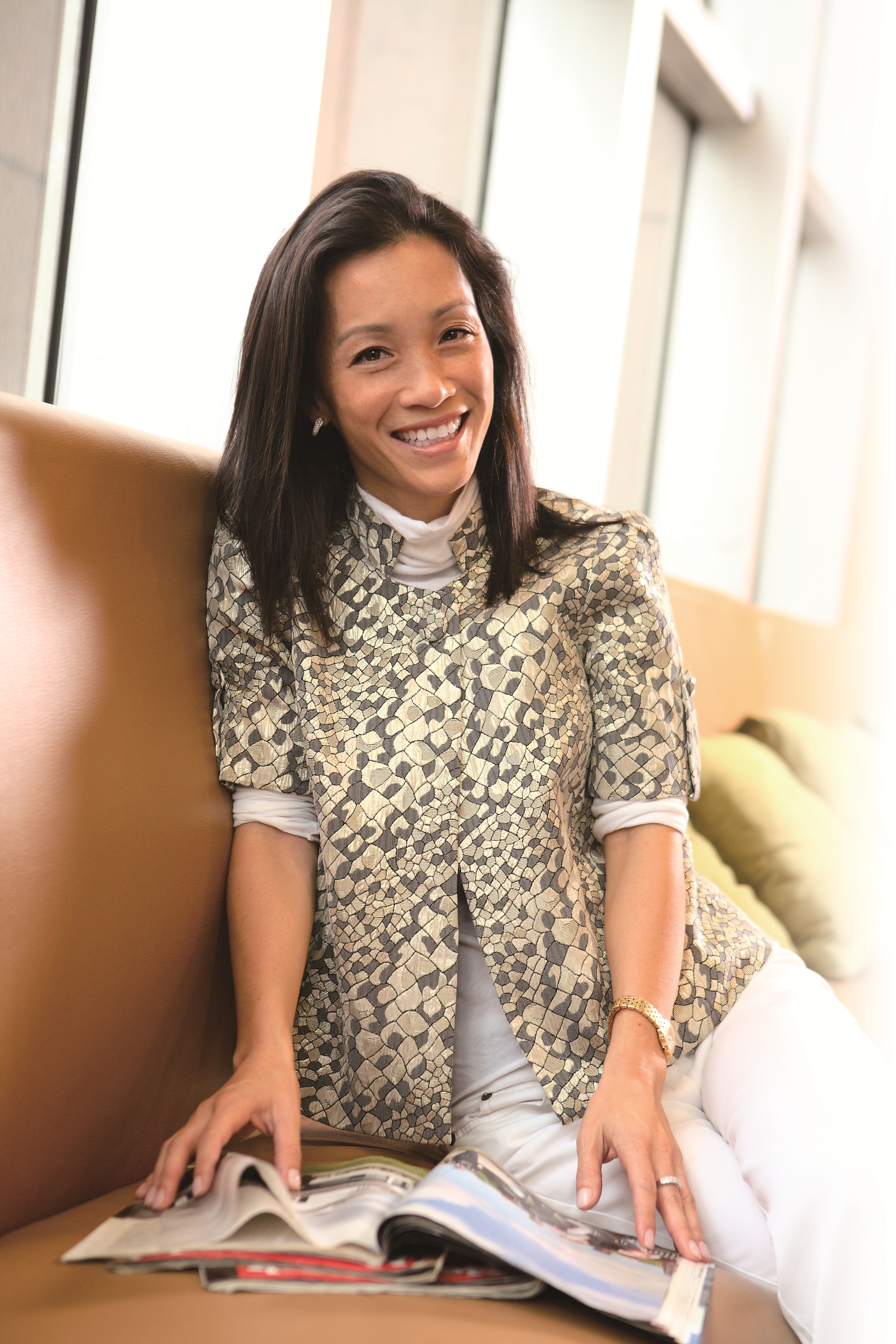
- Born: Deming Chen; November 18, 1970 (age 55); New York City, United States
- Occupations: Businesswoman, creative executive, author, television host
- Board member of: EF Education First; Keswick Foundation
- Relatives: Dehua Chen (sister); Detang Chen (brother)

Deming Chen, also widely known as M I N G (born November 18, 1970) is an American businesswoman, creative executive, author, long-distance runner, marathoner and former television host. She is Chief Culture Officer of EF Education First. She is also a board member of Keswick Foundation, a Hong Kong-based philanthropic organization and a brand ambassador of a London-based athletic wear company, Sweaty Betty. Ming serves on board of Hult International Business School and is on the Advisory Council of The Asian American Foundation.

== Early life and education ==
Chen was born in New York City. She grew up in Millburn, New Jersey and attended Millburn Senior High School. In 1988, she went to Harvard College and was elected Harvard Class Marshal of 1992. She earned her Bachelor of Arts in East Asian studies in 1992. She then began her career at an entertainment company, Media Assets, in Hong Kong. Later she attended Harvard Business School and received her Master of Business Administration (MBA) in 1998.

== Career ==
After graduating from Harvard College, Chen started her career in Hong Kong as a television host of News Corporation’s Star TV. She also worked in television as the co-host of the Children's Channel and then worked at Turner Broadcasting. Chen received her MBA from Harvard Business School upon which she joined EF Education First. She serves as EF's Chief Culture Officer. She has helped to launch the EF's English Proficiency Index and is on the board of, Hult International Business School.

=== Publications ===
"Sassparilla's New Shoes" is her first published children's book co-authored with her identical twin sister Dehua Chen. In 1999, the book was published by E.M. Press. The twin sisters co-authored another children's book named "Ling Ling Looked in the Mirror" illustrated by Mariko Jesse and published by Chameleon Press in 2001. Chen and her twin sister appeared as vampiric characters in Melissa de la Cruz’s Blue Bloods series as Deming Chen, Angel of Mercy, and Dehua Chen, Angel of Immortality. UK publisher Lantana Publishing has slated their third book, Escape: One Day We Had to Run for May 2021. "Escape; One Day We Had To Run" received a Kirkus starred review and is longlisted for a 2022 UK Literary Association Book Award.

=== Awards ===
Established in 2014, the Women of Hope (WOH) awards was established to recognize the influential women of Hong Kong who campaign and champion the calls for social justice that benefit women, children and the community at large. In 2016, the WOH honoured 8 women from different industries and Ming Chen has been honoured with an Award under Children's Advocate category.
