= Aliona van der Horst =

Dutch documentary film director

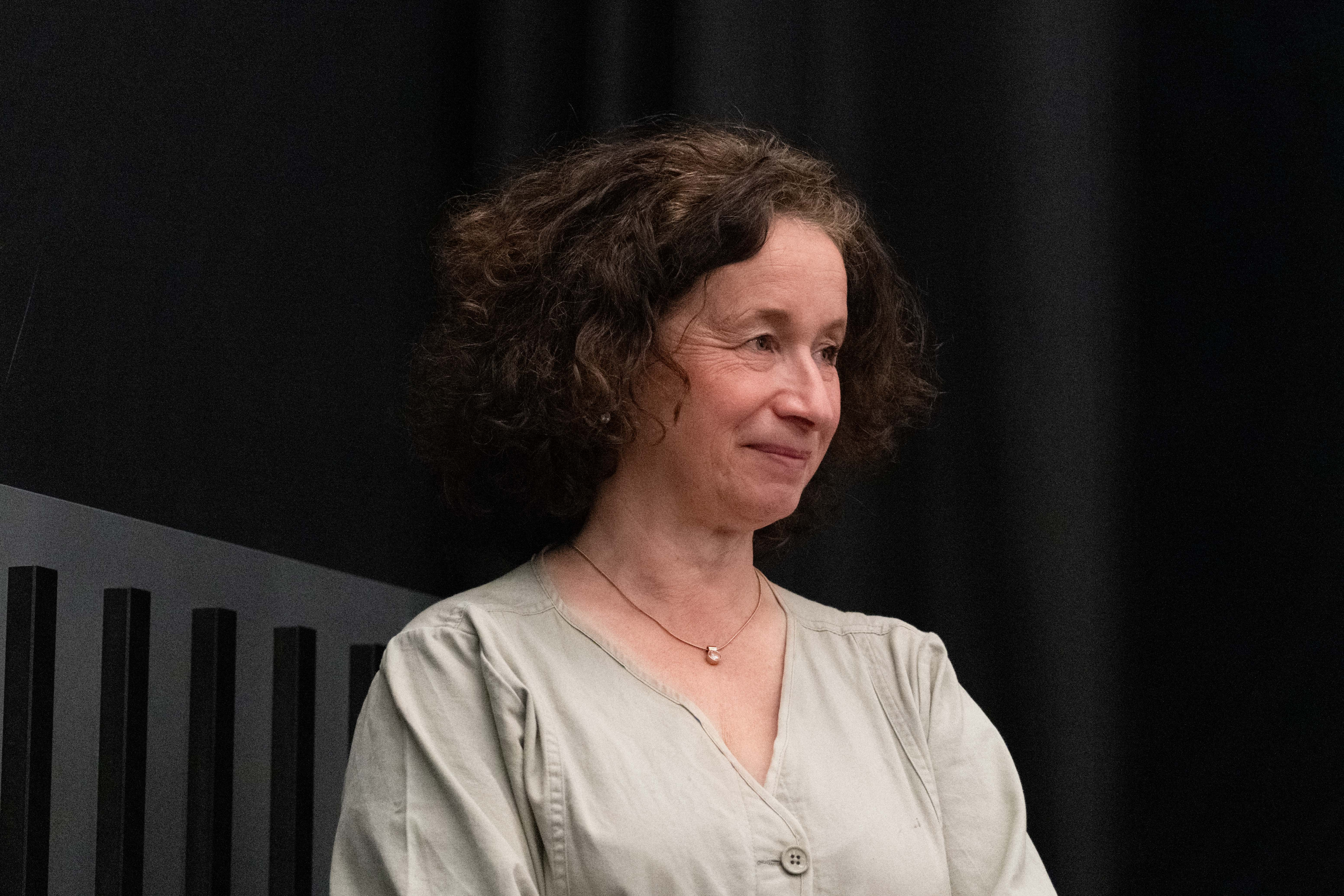
- Born: Aliona van der Horst; 1970 (age 55–56); Moscow, USSR

Aliona van der Horst (born 1970) is a Dutch documentary filmmaker, cinematographer and editor.

== Life ==
Aliona van der Horst was born to a Dutch father and a Russian mother and grew up in the Netherlands. She studied Russian literature at the University of Amsterdam (1988–1993) and completed documentary film directing at the Dutch Filmers Academy (1993–1997). She holds a master's degree in Russian Literature from the University of Amsterdam. During her studies, she worked as a Russian interpreter, which ultimately led her to pursue documentary direction at the Dutch Filmers Academy. She graduated in 1997 with The Lady with the White Hat,

She has made feature-length documentaries, including Gerlach (2023), Turn your body to the Sun (2021), Love is Potatoes (2017), Water Children (2011), Boris Ryzhy (2008) and Voices of Bam (2006). Her work is poetic and visually distinctive, often focussing on art, culture, and personal histories.

Her films have been screened at festivals such as the International Documentary Film Festival Amsterdam, Tribeca Festival (New York), True/False Film Festival (Columbia), Hot Docs Canadian International Documentary Festival (Toronto) CPH:Doc, (Copenhagen), Edinburgh International Film Festival (Scotland), Artdocfest (Moscow) and Dok Leipzig (Germany).

Van der Horst has had retrospectives of her films at Crossing Europe, Linz (2024), Docudays Kiev (2015), Beldocs international filmfestival (2017) and Filmacoteka de Catalunya (2013).

Van der Horst is a member of the documentary branch of the Academy of Motion Picture Arts and Sciences. She has been a guest tutor at IDFA Project Space Netherlands and International, DocNomads and the Duth Filmers Academy, and given masterclasses at universities and film festivals. She is one of the founders of Docmakers, a collectively-owned, all-female documentary production company.

== Critical reception ==
Dutch film critic and philosopher Dana Linsen has described Van der Horst's films as essayistic and classically documentary, emerging from research and collaboration, and noted the use of artistic interventions to explore absence and presence. Film critic Nicole Sante highlighted Van de Horst's ability to integrate image, sound, music, and dialogue in storytelling, and to find beauty in unexpected places.

== Filmography ==
=== Short films ===
- Memorabilia (1950, 10 min): explores people's earliest memories and their meanings.
- The Lady with the White Hat (1997, 47 min): Focuses on a Ukrainian language teacher who is involved in the dissident movement and punished with confinement in a mental institution.
- Kiev: The Dissident and the General (1998, 15 min): two former adversaries working together to heal the trauma of the Stalinist purges.
- The Little Red Box (1998, 20 min): a children's documentary about best friends who quarrel over a red box.
- After the Springs of '68, a Story About Love (2000, 58 min): about the filmmaker's parents and their experiences during the initial years of their marriage, set against the backdrop of the Cold War.
- A Passion for the Hermitage (2003, 6 x 25 min): a six-part series about the Hermitage Museum in St. Petersburg, focussing on how staff preserved artworks through war and oppression.
- Boris Ryzhy (2008, 59 min): about the poet Boris Ryzhy from Yekaterinburg. Geoffrey McNab in Screen Daily called it "one of the best liked films in the festival" (IDFA).
- 15 Attempts (2013, 50 min): follows artist Suchan Kinochita during a two-week art project in Brussels.

=== Feature films ===
- The Hermitage Dwellers (2006, 74 min), another film about the Hermitage Museum in St. Petersburg.
- Voices of Bam (2006, 90 min): co-directed with Maasja Ooms, documents the lives of residents in Bam, Iran after the 2003 earthquake. Jay Weissberg in Variety described it as an "essay on loss", saying "Shots of a grieving woman at her daughter's tomb are almost indecently exploitative, though general palimpsest of emotions creates a powerful elegy".
- Water Children (2011, 73 min): about artist Tomoko Mukaiyama and her installation of 12,000 white dresses in rural Japan. Gawie Keyser called it "even zinnelijk is als Werner Herzogs vroege films, of ál de films van Terrence Malick" [an unforgettable, claustrophobic work that is at times as sensual as Werner Herzog's early films, or all of Terence Malick's films]. De Volkskrant called it "deze bitterzoete documentaire" [this bittersweet documentary].
- Love Is Potatoes (2017, 90 min): A personal exploration of generational divides and emotional distances, set in the Moscow region within the cramped family home of Van der Horst's mother and aunts.
- Turn Your Body to the Sun (2021, 90 min): examines the Soviet legacy through one woman's search for her father's history. Peter Bradshaw, writing in The Guardian, said that the film "tells an impossibly painful and sad story from the second world war; it is an extraordinary tale, arguably worthy of Boris Pasternak and David Lean".
- Gerlach (2023, 74 min): a portrait of a farmer who has spent sixty years working near Amsterdam airport, surrounded by modern developments and threatened by property developers and climate change.

== Awards ==
- After the Spring of '68, a Story about Love (2000): Dutch Academy Award
- A Passion for the Hermitage (2003): Dutch Academy Award
- The Hermitage Dwellers (2006): Grand Prix, FIFA Montreal, Canada
- Voices of Bam (co-directed with Maasja Ooms, 2006): Special Jury Award, Tribeca International Film Festival
- Boris Ryzhy (2008): Silver Wolf Award, IDFA, Netherlands; Grand Prix, Edinburgh Film Festival; IDFA Midlength Doc Award
- Water Children (2011): DOXA Grand Prix
- Love Is Potatoes (2017): Interreligious Jury Award, Honorary Mention, DOK Leipzig; Golden Calf for Best Dutch Feature, Netherlands Film Festival (2018); Grand Prix, Artdocfest (Russia); Life Tales Award, Biografilm Festival (Italy); Dutch Directors Guild Award (2018); Awards in Ireland, Brazil, Lebanon, Croatia
- Turn Your Body to the Sun (2021): Golden Conch Award, Mumbai International Film Festival (India, 2022)
- Gerlach, the Last Farmer (co-directed with Luuk Bouwman, 2023): Best Dutch Documentary Award, IDFA
