= Translations (film) =

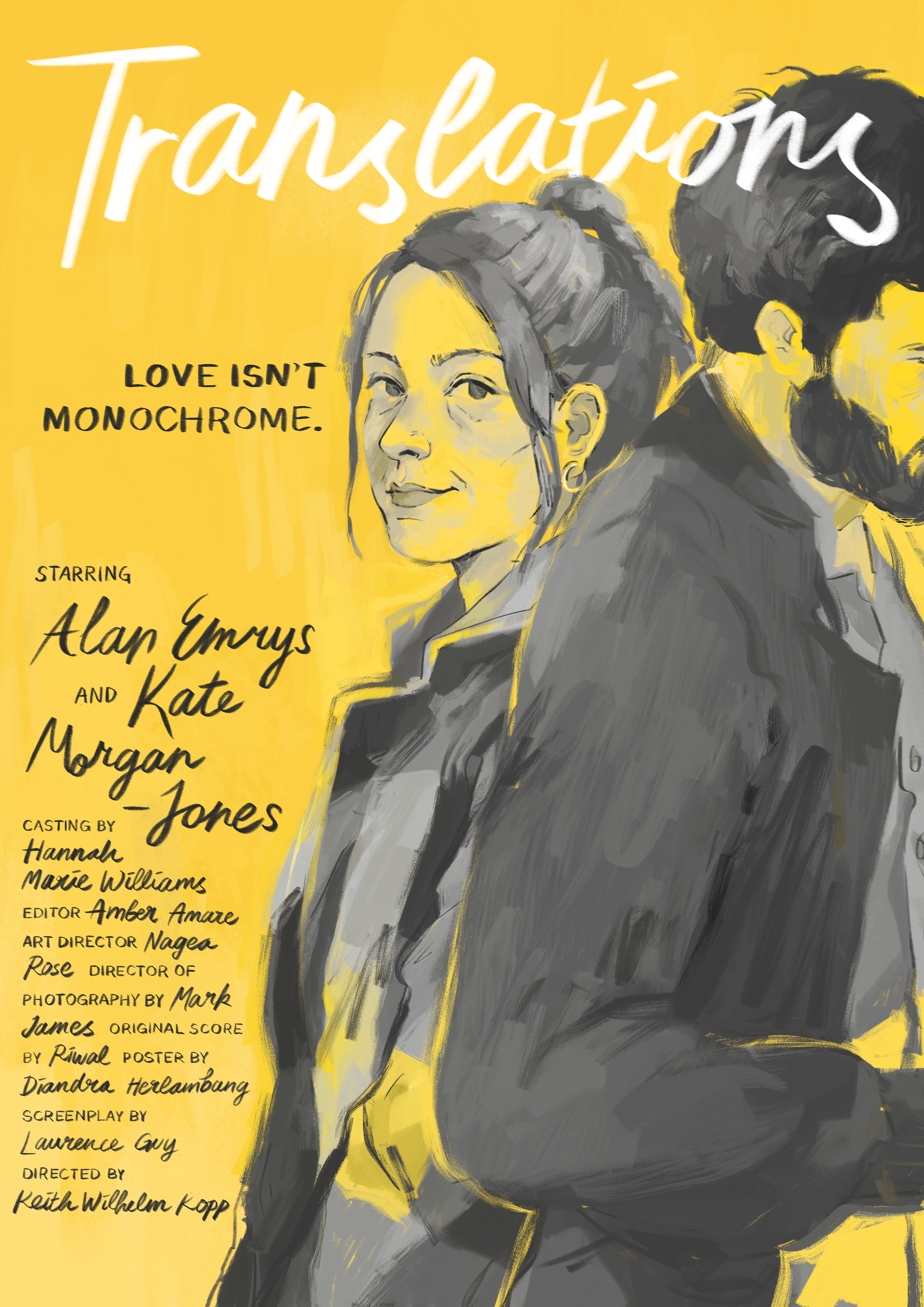
- Translations theatrical poster
- Directed by: Keith Wilhelm Kopp
- Written by: Laurence Guy
- Starring: Kate Morgan-Jones, Alan Emrys
- Cinematography: Mark James
- Edited by: Amber Amare
- Music by: Riwal
- Production company: Kopp Pictures
- Release dates: 23 April 2023 (Riverside International Film Festival); 2 June 2023 (UK)
- Running time: 84
- Country: United Kingdom
- Languages: British English, Welsh

Translations is a 2023 black-and-white romance drama feature film directed by Keith Wilhelm Kopp. The story follows Stef, an agoraphobic translator, as she reconnects with her late brother's best friend, Evan, uncovering shared trauma and exploring themes of grief, love, and healing.

The film is set in Wales and incorporates elements of Welsh language and culture.

== Plot ==
Stef has not left her house in a long time, struggling with the loss of her brother, Liam, and an overwhelming fear of the outside world. When Evan, Liam's best friend, arrives to give her Liam's journal, the two form an unexpected connection. As they confront their shared grief, they begin to question whether their bond is built on healing or simply their past. Torn between Evan's vision of the world beyond her walls and the story of lost love she is translating from a previous generation, Stef must decide what kind of future she wants—and whether Evan has a place in it.

== Production ==
The film was made during the first lifting of coronavirus lockdown in the UK in 2020, the cast and crew lived together and shot the film over nine days. Translations was made in Wales and England.

== Release ==
Translations premiered to generally positive reviews for its exploration of mental health and the complexities of relationships. The film won three awards at the Riverside International Film Festival, including Best Screenplay, Best Actress, and Audience Choice Award for Best Feature Film. Released in UK cinemas in 2023, the film is now available on streaming platforms.
