= He's My Brother (film) =

2021 Danish documentary film

He's My Brother is a 2021 Danish documentary film which explores the lives of Christine, one of the directors of the film, and her older brother, Peter, who was born deaf, blind, and autistic. As Peter turns 30, the family struggles in finding a care home that can adequately care for him. The film was directed by Cille Hannibal and Christine Hanberg.
