= Pul-e-Sokhta =

Pul-e-Sokhta پل سوخته
- Neighborhood of Kabul
- Country: Afghanistan
- Province: Kabul

Pul-e-Sokhta also spelled as Pule Sokhta or Puli Sokhta (Dari: پل سوخته) is a neighborhood located in the western part of Kabul, Afghanistan. The Kabul River, which originates in the Paghman mountains, passes through this area. The name of this area is taken from the big bridge in the center of this area. Most of the inhabitants of this region are Hazaras and other ethnic groups live in this region. Adjacent areas of this region are Koht-e Sangi, Pul-e-Sorkh, and Sarkariz.

== See also ==
- Neighborhoods of Kabul
