= Black Sun (2005 film) =

- Directed by: Gary Tarn
- Produced by: John Battsek
- Starring: Hugues de Montalembert
- Edited by: Gary Tarn
- Music by: Gary Tarn
- Distributed by: IndiePix Films
- Release date: 2005
- Running time: 70 minutes
- Country: United Kingdom
- Language: English

Black Sun is a documentary film directed by Gary Tarn. The film premiered at the 2005 Toronto International Film Festival. Tarn received a nomination for the Carl Foreman Award for Special Achievement by a British Director, Writer or Producer in their First Feature Film in 2007 from BAFTA.

Tarn explores the story of Hugues de Montalembert, a New York-based artist and filmmaker who was blinded by a vicious, unprovoked attack by two young assailants in 1978. After the attack, Montalembert learned to cope with his despair and to go through life a new way, seeking to make ordinary things extraordinary. Defying expectation, this remarkable artist continued to travel the world alone, learning to navigate life in a new and beautiful way. Through creative imagery and philosophical narration, director and composer Gary Tarn creates an image of both an extraordinary life without vision, and the idea of perception in general.

== See also ==
- Black Sun (alchemy)
