= Drum Theatre (musical group) =

British pop group

- Origin: United Kingdom
- Genres: Pop rock, synthpop
- Years active: 1985–1987
- Labels: Epic Records
- Past members: Myles Benedict; Kent Brainerd; Patrick Gallagher; Simon Moore; Paul Snook; Ronny Watson Gary Tarn

Drum Theatre were a British pop group, active in the mid-1980s. The band released four singles and one album, after which they disbanded.

In 2013, the label Cherry Red Records published a remastered version of the original album, Everyman. The remastered album included six additional tracks.

== Discography ==
=== Singles ===
- "Eldorado" (1985) – European number 1, UK number 44, ITA number 2, NL number 13
- "Living in the Past" (1985) – UK number 67, ITA number 25
- "Home (Is Where the Heart Is)" (1986) ITA number 27, UK number 91
- "Moving Targets" (1987)

=== Albums ===
- Everyman (1986)
- Everyman (2013) (Remastered version)
