= African Film Festival, Inc. =

U.S. non-profit organization

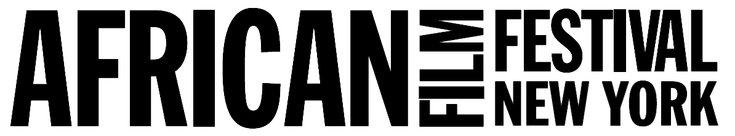
- Location: New York, NY
- Founded: 1990; 36 years ago
- Website: https://www.africanfilmny.org

African Film Festival, Inc. (AFF) is a non-profit cultural organization that presents an annual film festival and year-round community programs. Based in New York City, the organization was founded in 1990. The organization is dedicated to promoting greater understanding of African culture through film.

== Programming ==
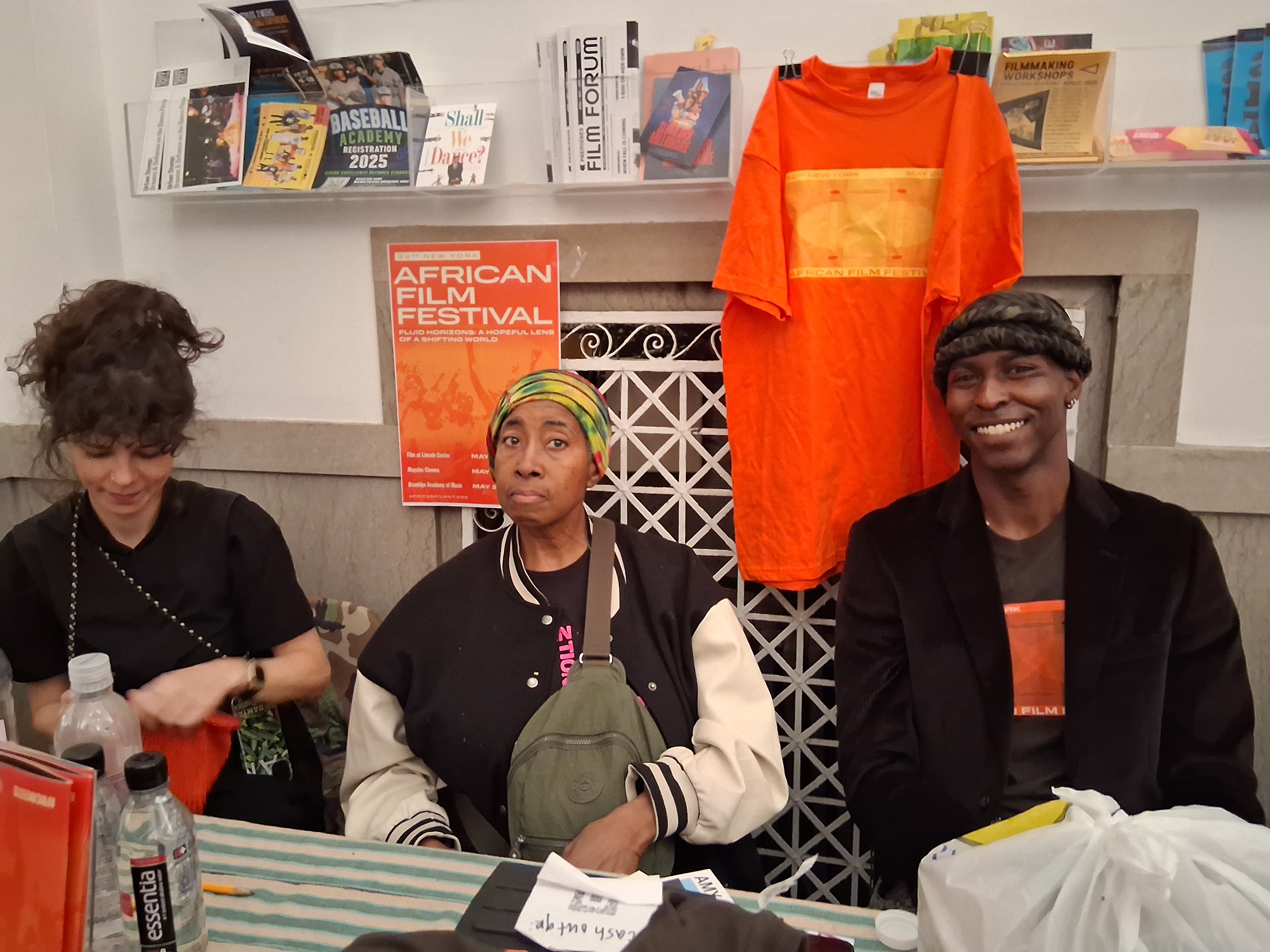
African Film Festival at Rose Cinema in Brooklyn, NY - Dance Africa 2025

AFF was established in 1990, by Mahen Bonetti and an ad hoc committee of African and American artists and scholars. AFF's flagship program, the New York African Film Festival (NYAFF) was launched in 1993 under the banner of "Modern Days, Ancient Nights". The festival was co-presented with the Film Society of Lincoln Center and in association with Brooklyn Museum. It showcased classic and contemporary works including films such as Udju Azul di Yonta by Flora Gomes, Yeelen by Souleymane Cissé, Kaddu Beykat by Safi Faye and Djibril Diop Mambéty's Badou Boy, among others. There was also a retrospective on the films of Ousmane Sembène. The festival has been held annually between the months of April and May.

The annual festival, co-presented with Film Society of Lincoln Center, includes film screenings, live performances, art exhibits, panel discussions, artist talkbacks, educational youth programs, master classes and workshops. In 2004, Brooklyn Academy of Music's BAMcinématek became a co-presenter of the NYAFF. In 2011, Maysles Cinema Institute launched a segment of the festival screenings and presentations. AFF has introduced to American audiences the works of many African filmmakers, including Abderrahmane Sissako, Lupita Nyong'o, Tunde Kelani among others. The festival runs for 8–14 days and showcases about 40 classic and contemporary films each year. The organization also hosts a National Traveling Series which consists of a package of short and feature films selected from the latest edition of the New York African Film Festival and is presented at institutions around the U.S.

AFF collaborates on year-round cultural and educational programs around New York City with city-based institutions and agencies such as Schomburg Center for Research in Black Culture, CityParks Foundation, Electronic Arts Intermix, MoCADA, The Trust for Governors Island, Queens Museum and Bronx Museum of the Arts. In addition, AFF also collaborates with festivals and organizations internationally.

Notable program attendees include, the late "Father of African Cinema", Ousmane Sembène, playwright, poet and Nobel Prize laureate, Wole Soyinka, late singer and civil rights activist Miriam Makeba and singer, songwriter, actor, and social activist, Harry Belafonte.

== Publications ==
In 2003, AFF published the anthology Through African Eyes: Dialogues with the Directors, which featured conversations with pioneer and emerging African filmmakers. In 2010, AFF released the second edition of the publication, featuring an overview of African cinema in the 20th and 21st centuries through essays and interviews with African directors. In 2013, to commemorate the 20th anniversary of the New York African Film Festival, AFF published an anniversary anthology, titled Looking Back, Looking Forward: 20 Years of the New York African Film Festival.

== Bibliography ==
- Bonetti, Mahen, and Prerana Reddy. Through African Eyes: Dialogues with the Directors. New York, NY: African Film Festival, 2003. ISBN 9780974014104
- Through African Eyes Conversations with the Directors, Volume 2. New York, NY: African Film Festival, Inc. 2010. ISBN 978-0615360904.
- Mahen Bonetti and Beatriz Leal Riesco (eds), Looking Back, Looking Forward: 20 Years of the New York African Film Festival, 2013.
