= Siad =

Siad or SIAD may refer to:

- Siad (name)
- Șiad, a village in Craiva, Romania
- Self-injury Awareness Day, a grassroots annual global awareness event on March 1
- Sierra Army Depot, California, United States
- Syndrome of inappropriate antidiuresis, a syndrome characterized by excessive unsuppressible release of antidiuretic hormone
- Surrey Institute of Art & Design, University College in the United Kingdom
- Supersonic Inflatable Aerodynamic Decelerator (SIAD), the main part of Low-Density Supersonic Decelerator
