= Siad (name) =

Siad may refer to the following notable people:

Given name

- Siad Barre (1919–1995), Somali politician
- Siad Haji (born 1999), Kenyan-born football player

Surname

- Fatima Siad (born 1986), Ethiopian-Somali fashion model
- Mohamed Siad, multiple people
- Patrick Erouart-Siad (born 1955), French writer
