= Savigny-sur-Orge =

Commune in Île-de-France, France

- Commune
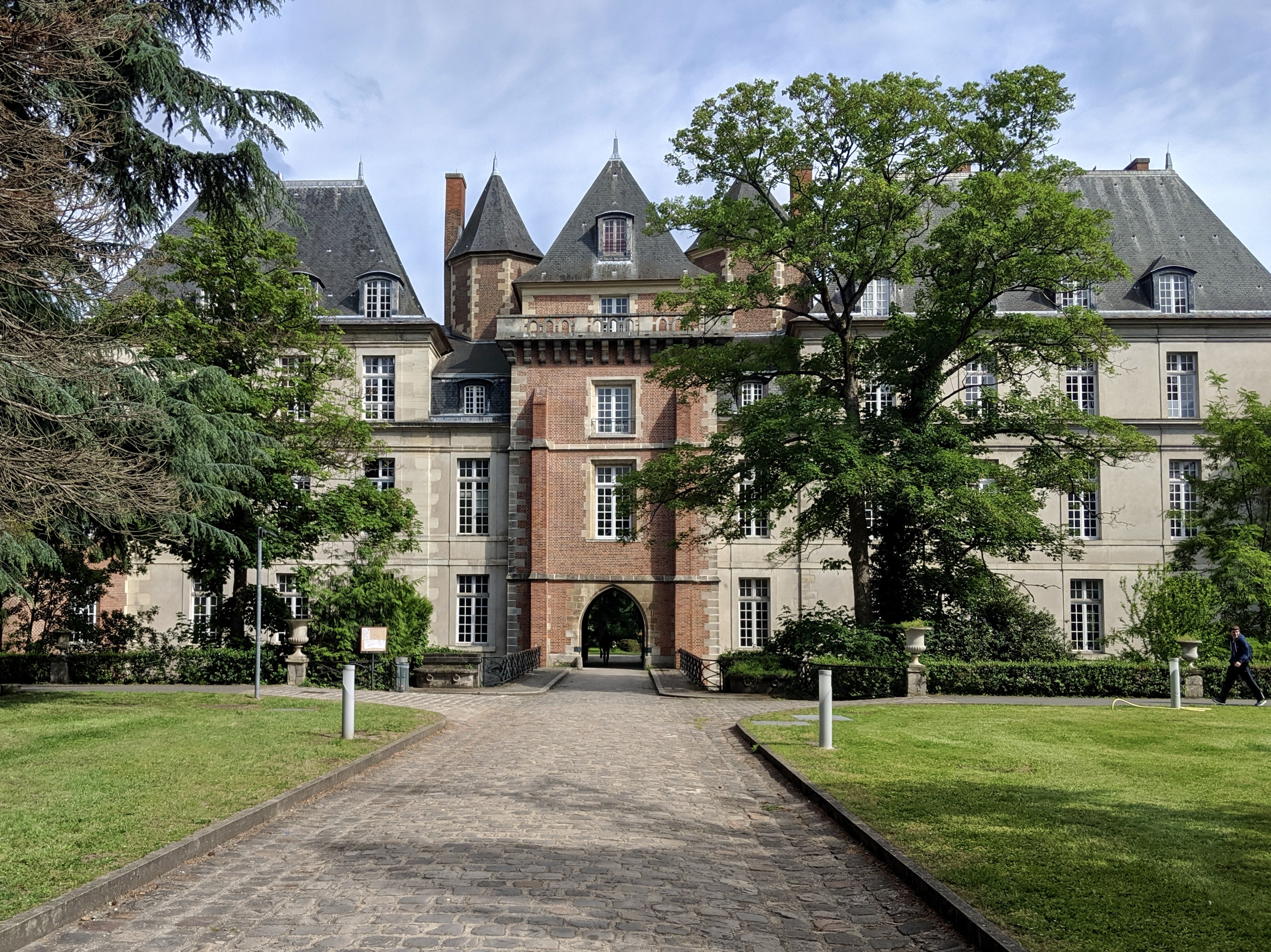
- The Château de Savigny, now the Lycée Corot

- Coat of arms

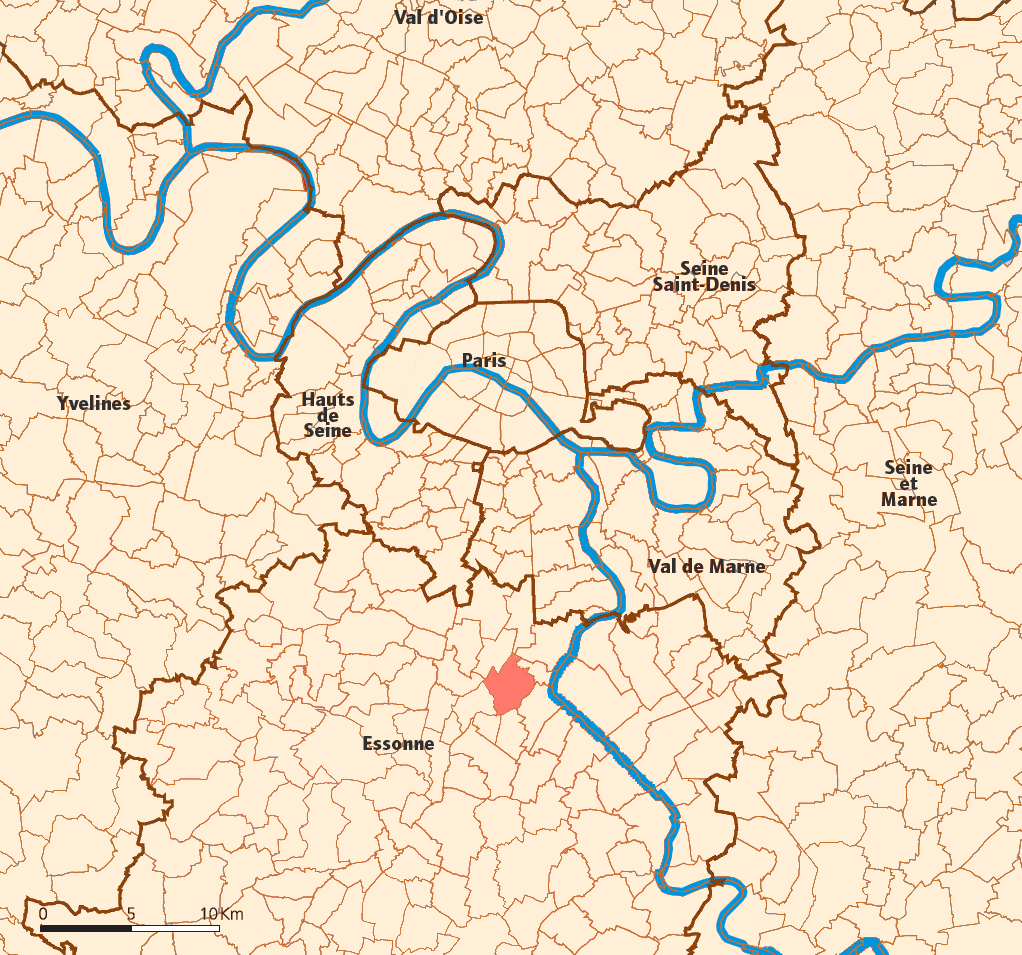
- Location (in red) within Paris inner and outer suburbs
- Location of Savigny-sur-Orge
- Location within France Location within Île-de-France (region)
- Coordinates: 48°40′47″N 2°20′45″E
- Country: France
- Region: Île-de-France
- Department: Essonne
- Arrondissement: Palaiseau
- Canton: Savigny-sur-Orge
- Intercommunality: Grand Paris

Government
  - Mayor (2021–2026): Alexis Teillet
- Area^{1}: 6.97 km^{2} (2.69 sq mi)
- Highest elevation: 99 m (325 ft)
- Lowest elevation: 33 m (108 ft)
- Population (2023): 37,601
  - Density: 5,390/km^{2} (14,000/sq mi)
- Demonym: Saviniens
- Time zone: UTC+01:00 (CET)
  - Summer (DST): UTC+02:00 (CEST)
- INSEE/Postal code: 91589 /91600
- Website: www.savigny.org
- ^{1} French Land Register data, which excludes lakes, ponds, glaciers > 1 km^{2} (0.386 sq mi or 247 acres) and river estuaries.

Savigny-sur-Orge (French pronunciation: [saviɲi syʁ ɔʁʒ]; lit. 'Savigny-on-Orge') or simply Savigny is a commune in the southern outer suburbs of Paris, France. It is located in the Essonne department, 19.1 km (11.9 mi) from the centre of Paris.

It is home to a renowned high school, the Lycée Jean-Baptiste Corot – Le Château, comprising a 15th-century château, which was the property of Louis-Nicolas Davout, Duke of Auerstaedt, Prince of Eckmühl, a marshal of France under Napoleon. Davout served as mayor, and the city's main square bears his name.

Inhabitants of Savigny-sur-Orge are known as Saviniens (masculine) and Saviniennes (feminine) in French. Writer Patrick Erouart-Siad (born 1955 in Savigny) won the 1993 Prix Ève Delacroix of the Académie Française. During the 2005 civil unrest, Savigny-sur-Orge was the first city to implement a curfew.

== Toponymy ==
The name Savigny derives from the Latin Sabiniacum, meaning the 'estate of Sabinius', a Gallo-Roman landowner.

== History ==
The Hôtel de Ville was completed in 1999.

== Population ==
Historical population

Year	Pop.	±% p.a.
1793	1,005	—
1800	823	−2.81%
1806	911	+1.71%
1821	895	−0.12%
1831	925	+0.33%
1836	882	−0.95%
1841	955	+1.60%
1846	932	−0.49%
1851	923	−0.19%
1856	1,016	+1.94%
1861	1,260	+4.40%
1866	1,246	−0.22%
1872	1,255	+0.12%
1876	1,348	+1.80%
1881	1,386	+0.56%
1886	1,472	+1.21%
1891	1,684	+2.73%
1896	1,667	−0.20%
1901	1,647	−0.24%

Year	Pop.	±% p.a.
1906	1,711	+0.77%
1911	1,848	+1.55%
1921	1,995	+0.77%
1926	5,593	+22.90%
1931	11,582	+15.67%
1936	13,039	+2.40%
1946	14,554	+1.11%
1954	17,608	+2.41%
1962	24,219	+4.07%
1968	31,956	+4.73%
1975	34,478	+1.09%
1982	32,502	−0.84%
1990	33,295	+0.30%
1999	36,258	+0.95%
2007	37,469	+0.41%
2012	37,135	−0.18%
2017	36,533	−0.33%
2023	37,601	+0.48%

Source: EHESS and INSEE (1968–2023)

== Sport ==
The city hosts a baseball team called The Lions of Savigny-sur-Orge which plays at a national level.

== Transport ==
Savigny-sur-Orge is served by Savigny-sur-Orge station on Line C of the Paris Réseau Express Régional (RER).

In May 1909 a venue for aviation races and exhibitions, Port-Aviation, opened to the public in neighbouring Viry-Châtillon as the world's first purpose-built aerodrome. Distinguished visitors arrived at Savigny-sur-Orge station, about 900 metres (980 yd) from Port-Aviation in Savigny-sur-Orge. This led the press and post card publishers occasionally to refer to Port-Aviation by the misnomer "Sauvigny Airfield." However, the general public attending events at Port-Aviation arrived from Paris by rail at Juvisy station in Juvisy-sur-Orge, just under a kilometre (0.6 mile) from the airfield, and the Juvisy railway station had a sign directing visitors to "Juvisy Airfield." As a result, the press and post card publishers more frequently — and just as inaccurately — referred to Port-Aviation as "Juvisy Airfield" or simply "Juvisy," which became the dominant misnomer for Port-Aviation.

== See also ==
- Communes of the Essonne department
