= Julie; or, The New Heloise =

1761 epistolary novel by Jean-Jacques Rousseau

Julie or the New Heloise
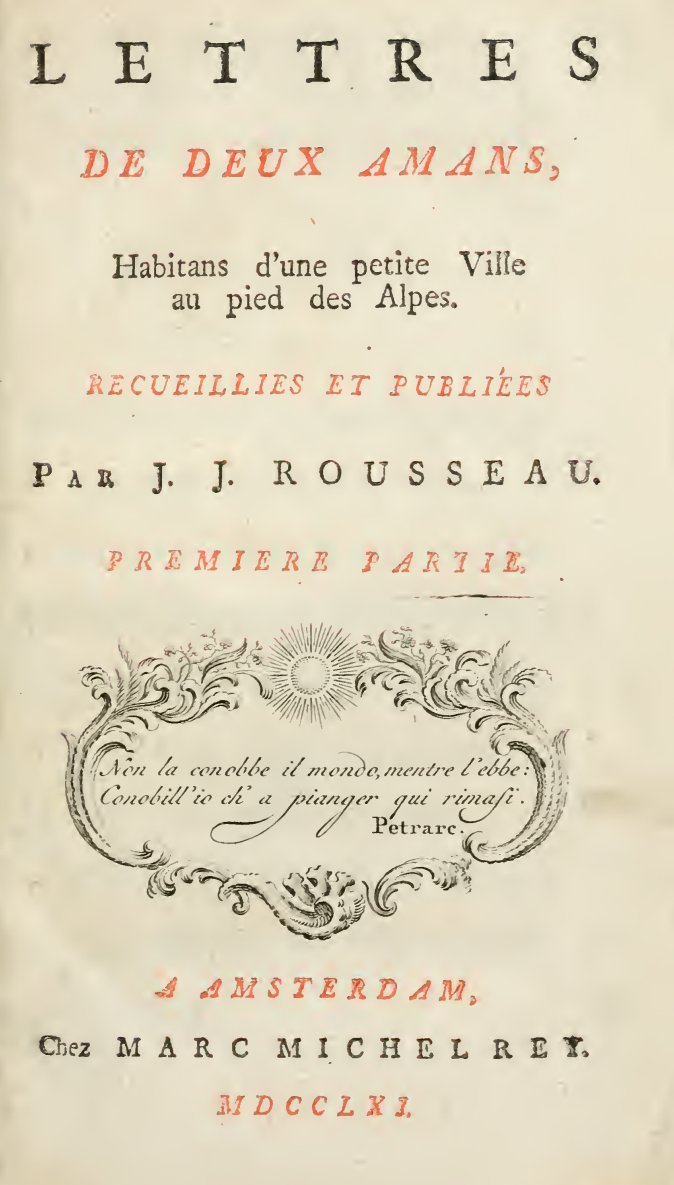
- First edition title page
- Author: Jean-Jacques Rousseau
- Original title: Lettres de Deux Amans, habitans d'une petite Ville au pied des Alpes
- Language: French
- Genre: Epistolary novel
- Publisher: Marc-Michel Rey
- Publication date: 1761
- Publication place: France
- Media type: Print

Julie or the New Heloise (French: Julie ou la nouvelle Héloïse), originally entitled Lettres de Deux Amans, Habitans d'une petite Ville au pied des Alpes (Letters from two lovers, living in a small town at the foot of the Alps), is an epistolary novel by Jean-Jacques Rousseau, published in 1761 by Marc-Michel Rey in Amsterdam. The novel's subtitle points to the history of Héloïse d'Argenteuil and Peter Abélard, a medieval story of passion and Christian renunciation.

== Overview ==
The plot, entirely related through letters, turns on the spontaneous love between Julie d'Étange, an aristocratic Swiss maiden living in Vevey on Lac Léman, and her tutor, a commoner who has no name but is given the pseudo-saint's name of St. Preux by Julie and her principal confidante, her cousin Claire. Although Rousseau wrote the work as a novel, a philosophical theory about virtue and authenticity permeates it. A common interpretation is that Rousseau valued the ethics of authenticity over rational moral principles, as he illustrates the principle that one should do what is imposed upon oneself by society only insofar as it would seem congruent with one's inner principles and feelings, being constituent of one's core identity. As this stood in conflict with the Church's authority, the book was listed on the Index Librorum Prohibitorum, prohibiting its distribution to Catholics.

Julie's eventual husband, the virtuous atheist Baron de Wolmar, is assumed to be based largely on Baron d'Holbach, given his friendship and generous sponsorship of Rousseau.

== Reception ==
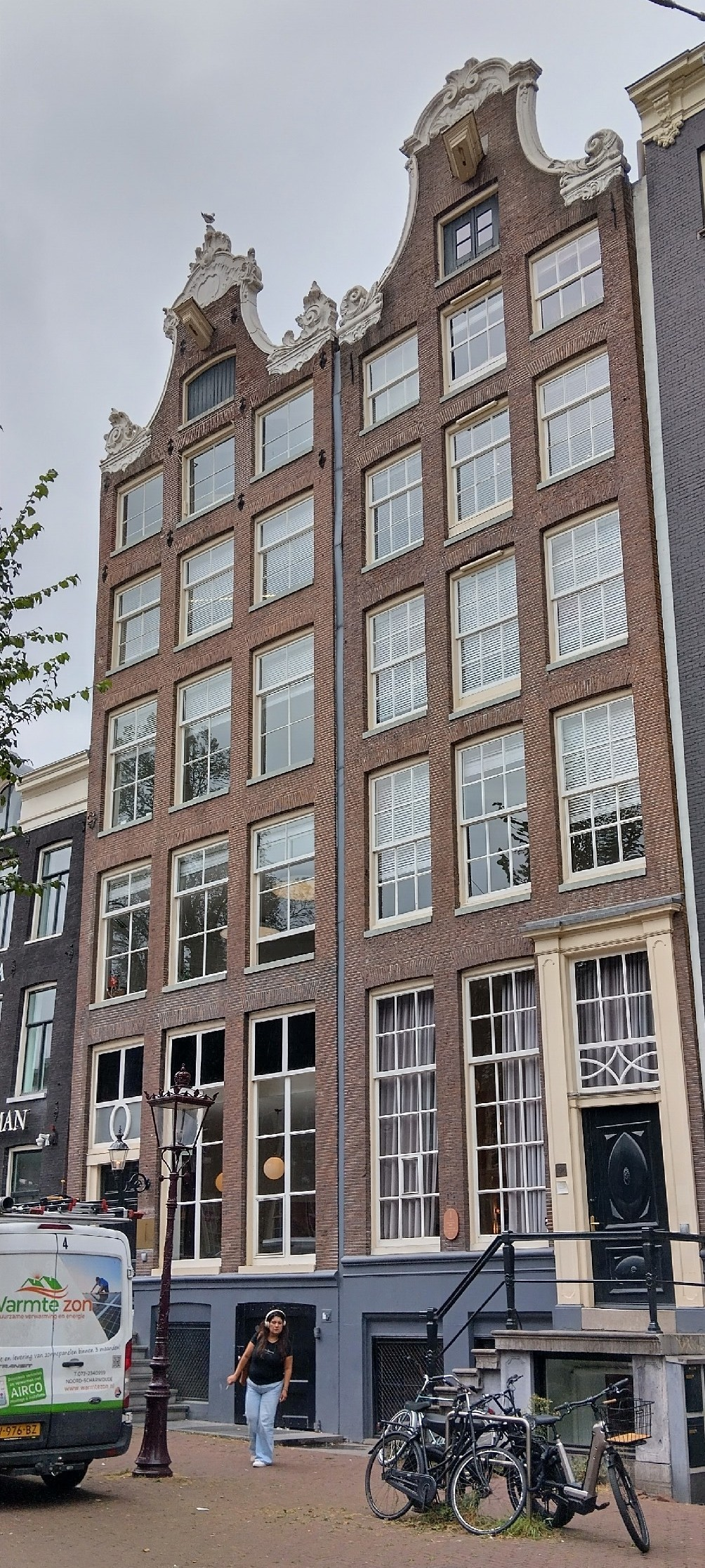
The house on the right NZ Voorburgwal 296, Amsterdam is where his principle publisher and friend Marc-Michel Rey lived and who urged Rousseau to put his memoirs in writing.

Arthur Schopenhauer called Julie one of the four greatest novels ever written, along with Tristram Shandy, Wilhelm Meister's Apprenticeship and Don Quixote. Julie was perhaps the best-selling novel of the 18th century. Some readers were so overcome that they wrote to Rousseau in droves, creating the first celebrity author. One reader claimed that the novel nearly drove him mad from excess of feeling while another claimed that the violent sobbing he underwent cured his cold. Reader after reader describes their "tears", "sighs", "torments" and "ecstasies" to Rousseau. Diane de Polignac wrote to Marie Madeleine de Brémond d’Ars after finishing the novel:

I dare not tell you the effect it had on me; no, I was past weeping; an intense pain took possession of me, my heart seized up; the dying Julie was no longer someone unknown to me, I became her sister, her friend, her Claire; I was so convulsed that had I not put the book down I would have been as overcome as all those who attended that virtuous woman in her last moments.

Some readers simply could not accept that the book was fiction. Madame Duverger wrote to Rousseau asking:

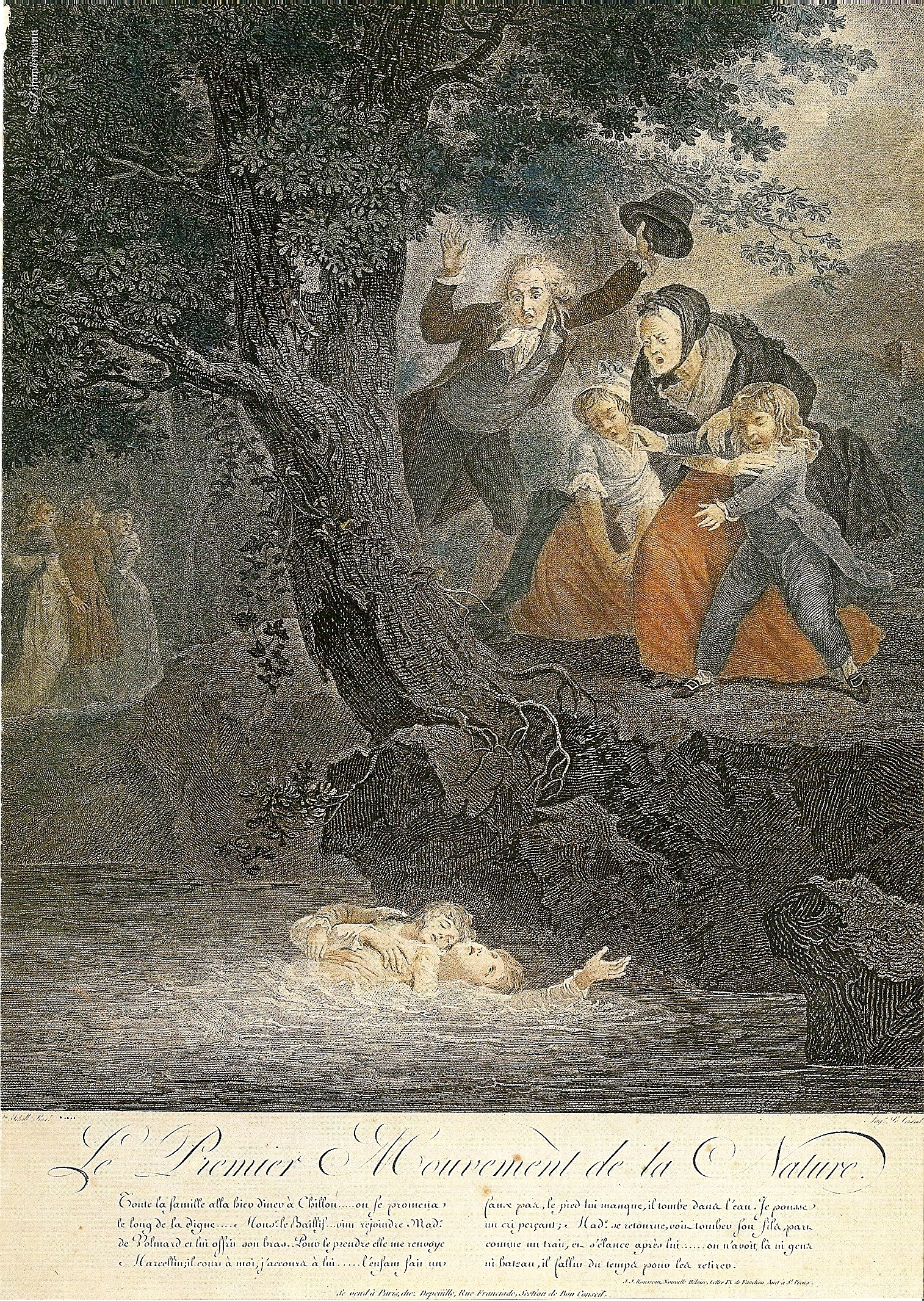
Le premier mouvement de la Nature (the first movement of Nature)

Many persons who have read your book, to whom I have spoken, have assured me that you thought it all up. This I cannot believe. Could a false reading n sensation comparable to what I felt in reading it? Once more, Monsieur, did Julie exist? Is St Preux still alive? In what part of this earth does he live? Did Claire, that tender Claire, follow her other half? Are M. de Wolmar, Mylord Edward, all those persons, only imaginary, as some try to persuade me? What is then the world where we live, where virtue is but an idea? Happy mortal, you alone perhaps know and practice it.

Others identified less with the individual characters and more with the nature of their struggles, seeing in Julie a story of temptation, sin and redemption that resembled their own lives.

Rousseau liked to tell of how one lady ordered her carriage to take her to the Opera, and then picked up Julie only to continue reading it until the next morning. So many women wrote to him offering their love that he speculated there was not a single high society woman whom he could not have bedded if he had wanted.

The novel made a strong impression on Napoleon in his youth, and he would often read either it or the Bible aloud to guests while he was a prisoner on St. Helena after dinner.

== See also ==
- Public opinion
- Bibliotherapy – Form of psychotherapy involving reading

== Bibliography ==
=== Translations ===
- William Kenrick (see links below)
- Julie, or the New Heloise, trans. Philip Stewart and Jean Vaché, Hanover NH: University Press of New England (The Collected Writings of Rousseau, vol. 6), 1997.

=== Books ===
- Santo L. Aricò, Rousseau's Art of persuasion in La nouvelle Héloïse, University Press of America, Lanham, 1994 ISBN 978-0-8191-9618-7
- (in French) Nouchine Behbahani, Paysages rêvés, paysages vécus dans La Nouvelle Héloïse de J.-J. Rousseau, Voltaire Foundation at the Taylor Institution, Oxford, 1989 ISBN 978-0-7294-0393-1
- (in French) L'Amour dans la nouvelle Héloïse : texte et intertexte : actes du colloque de Genève, 10-11-12 juin 1999, Éd. Jacques Berchtold, François Rosset, Droz, Genève, 2002 ISBN 978-2-600-00808-2
- (in French) Jean-Marie Carzou, La Conception de la nature humaine dans la Nouvelle Héloïse, Sauret, Paris, 1966
- (in French) Charles Dédéyan, Jean-Jacques Rousseau : la Nouvelle Héloïse, ou, l'éternel retour, Nizet, Saint-Genouph, 2002 ISBN 978-2-207-81269-3
- (in French) Charles Dédéyan, La Nouvelle Héloïse de Jean-Jacques Rousseau : étude d'ensemble, SEDES-CDU, Paris, 1990 ISBN 978-2-7181-2781-1
- Maurice R Funke, From saint to psychotic: the crisis of human identity in the late 18th century : a comparative study of Clarissa, La Nouvelle Héloise, Die Leiden des jungen Werthers, P. Lang, New York, 1983 ISBN 978-0-8204-0001-3
- James Fleming Jones, La Nouvelle Héloïse, Rousseau and utopia, Droz, Genève, 1977
- Peggy Kamuf, Fictions of Feminine Desire: Disclosures of Héloïse, U of Nebraska Press, Lincoln, 1982 ISBN 978-0-8032-2705-7
- (in French) François van Laere, Une Lecture du temps dans la Nouvelle Héloïse, La Baconnière, Neuchâtel, 1968
- (in French) Laurence Mall, Origines et retraites dans La Nouvelle Héloïse, P. Lang, New York, 1997 ISBN 978-0-8204-3349-3
- (in French) William Mead, Jean-Jacques Rousseau, ou le Romancier enchaîné; étude de la Nouvelle Héloïse, Presses universitaires de France, Paris, 1966
- (in French) Daniel Mornet, La Nouvelle Héloïse de J.-J. Rousseau : étude et analyse, Mellottée Paris, 1929
- (in French and German) Perry Reisewitz, L'Illusion salutaire : Jean-Jacques Rousseaus Nouvelle Héloïse als ästhetische Fortschreibung der philosophischen Anthropologie der Discours, Romanistischer Verlag, Bonn, 2000 ISBN 978-3-86143-103-9
- (in French) Yannick Séité, Du Livre au lire : La Nouvelle Héloïse, roman des lumières, Champion, Paris, 2002 ISBN 978-2-7453-0517-6
- (in French) Étienne Servais, Le Genre romanesque en France depuis l'apparition de la Nouvelle Héloïse jusqu'aux approches de la Révolution, M. Lamertin, Bruxelles, 1922
- (in French) Anne Tilleul, La Vertu du beau : essai sur La Nouvelle Héloïse, Humanitas nouvelle optique, Montréal, 1989 ISBN 978-2-89396-007-4

=== Articles ===
- (in French) Nouchine Behbahani, Paysages rêvés, paysages vécus dans La Nouvelle Héloïse de J. J. Rousseau, Voltaire Foundation at the Taylor Institution, Oxford, 1989, ISBN 978-0-7294-0393-1
- (in French) Jacques Berchtold, "L'Impossible Virginité du jardin verbal : les Leçons de la nature selon la Lettre IV, 11 de La Nouvelle Héloïse", Éd. et préf. Jürgen Söring, Peter Gasser, Rousseauismus: Naturevangelium und Literatur, Frankfurt, Peter Lang, 1999, pp. 53–83 ISBN 978-3-631-34916-8
- (in French) Nadine Bérenguier, "Le 'Dangereux Dépôt': Virginité et contrat dans Julie ou La Nouvelle Héloïse ", Eighteenth-Century Fiction, July 1997, n° 9 (4), pp. 447–63
- (in French) André Blanc, "Le Jardin de Julie", Dix-huitième Siècle, 1982, n° 14, pp. 357–76
- (in French) Luciano Bulber, "Jean-Jacques Rousseau, peintre de la nature-état d'âme dans La Nouvelle Héloïse", Kwartalnik Neofilologiczny, 1988, n° 35 (4), pp. 415–29
- (in French) Henri Coulet, "Couples dans La Nouvelle Héloïse", Littératures, Fall 1989, n° 21, pp. 69–81
- (in French) Catherine Cusset, "Cythère et Elysée: Jardin et plaisir de Watteau à Rousseau", Dalhousie French Studies, Winter 1994, n° 29, pp. 65–84
- (in French) Claude Labrosse, Éd. K. Kupisz, G.-A. Pérouse, J.-Y. Debreuille, "La Figure de Julie dans La Nouvelle Héloïse", Le Portrait littéraire, Lyon, PU de Lyon, 1988, pp. 153–58
- (in French) Michel Delon, "La Nouvelle Héloïse et le goût du rêve", Magazine Littéraire, Sept 1997, n° 357, pp. 36–38
- (in French) Arbi Dhifaoui, "L'Épistolaire et/ou la violence dans La Nouvelle Héloïse de Rousseau", Éd. et intro. Martine Debaisieux, Gabrielle Verdier, Violence et fiction jusqu'à la Révolution, Tübingen, Narr, 1998, pp. 357–66
- (in French) Jean Ehrard, "Le Corps de Julie", Éd. Raymond Trousson, Michèle Biblio. Mat-Hasquin, Jacques Lemaire, Ralph Heyndels, Thèmes et figures du siècle des Lumières : mélanges offerts à Roland Mortier, Genève, Droz, 1980, pp. 95–106
- (in French) Anne Srabian de Fabry, "L'Architecture secrète de La Nouvelle Héloïse", Australian Journal of French Studies, 1982 Jan.–Apr., n° 19 (1), pp. 3–10
- (in French) Anne Srabian de Fabry, "Quelques observations sur le dénouement de La Nouvelle Héloïse", French Review, Oct 1972, n° 46 (1), pp. 2–8
- (in French) R. J. Howells, "Désir et distance dans La Nouvelle Héloïse", Studies on Voltaire and the Eighteenth Century, 1985, n° 230, pp. 223–32
- (in French) R. J. Howells, "Deux histoires, un discours : La Nouvelle Héloïse et le récit des amours d'Émile et Sophie dans l'Émile", Studies on Voltaire and the Eighteenth Century, 1987, n° 249, pp. 267–94
- (in French) François Jost, "La Nouvelle Héloïse, Roman Suisse", Revue de Littérature Comparée, 1962, n° 35, pp. 538–65
- (in French) Tanguy L'Aminot, "L'Amour courtois dans La Nouvelle Héloïse", Piau-Gillot, Colette Éd. Desné, Roland Éd. L'Aminot, Tanguy Éd. Modernité et pérennité de Jean-Jacques Rousseau. Champion, Paris, 2002, pp. 241–57
- (in French) Claude Labrosse, "Nouveauté de La Nouvelle Héloïse," Eighteenth-Century Fiction, Jan–Apr 2001, n° 13 (2–3), pp. 235–46
- (in French) J.-L. Lecercle, "L'Inconscient et création littéraire : sur La Nouvelle Héloïse", Études Littéraires, 1969, n° 1, pp. 197–204
- (in French) Annie Leclerc, "Jean-Jacques Rousseau : l'Amour au pays des chimères", Magazine Littéraire, Par 1995, n° 331, pp. 31–34
- (in French) Pierre Rétat, Litteratures, "L'Économie rustique de Clarens", 1989 Fall; 21: 59–68
- Laurence Mall, "Les Aberrations de l'errance : le Voyage dans La Nouvelle Héloïse", Australian Journal of French Studies, 1994, n° 31 (2), pp. 175–87
- (in French) Francine Markovits, "Rousseau et l'éthique de Clarens : une économie des relations humaines", Stanford French Review, 1991, n° 15 (3), pp. 323–48
- (in French) Ourida Mostefai, Lectures de La Nouvelle Héloïse, N. Amer. Assn. for the Study of Jean-Jacques Rousseau, Ottawa, 1993 ISBN 978-0-9693132-3-6
  - (in French) Philip Knee, "Wolmar comme médiateur politique", pp. 117–27
  - (in French) Guy Lafrance, "L'Éthique de La Nouvelle Héloïse et du Vicaire Savoyard", pp. 141–50
  - Jim MacAdam, "Reading Julie Amour-propre-ly", pp. 107–16
  - (in French) Laurence Mall, pp. 163–73", "L'Intérieur et l'extérieur : Étude des lettres parisiennes dans La Nouvelle Héloïse", pp. 163–73
  - (in French) Jean Roussel, pp. 61–72", "La Nouvelle Héloïse et la politique : de l'écart à l'emblème", pp. 61–72
  - (in French) Teresa Sousa de Almeida, "La Circulation des lettres dans le roman ou le Partage des pouvoirs", pp. 175–84
  - (in French) Jean Terrasse, pp. 129–39", "Jean-Jacques, Saint-Preux et Wolmar : aspects de la relation pédagogique", pp. 129–39
  - (in French) Loïc Thommeret, "De La Nouvelle Héloïse aux Confessions, une triade infernale", pp. 213–21
  - (in French) María José Villaverde, "L'Égalité dans La Nouvelle Héloïse", pp. 73–84
- Ruth Ohayon, "Rousseau's Julie; Or, the Maternal Odyssey", College Language Association Journal, Sept. 1986, n° 30 (1), pp. 69–82
- (in French) Robert Osmont, "Expérience vécue et création romanesque : le sentiment de l'éphémère dans La Nouvelle Héloïse", Dix-huitième Siècle, 1975, n° 7, pp. 225–42
- (in French) Paul Pelckmans, "Le Rêve du voile dans La Nouvelle Héloïse", Revue Romane, 1982, n° 17 (1), pp. 86–97
- (in French) René Pomeau, "Le Paysage de La Nouvelle Héloïse : l'Asile, l'espace", The Feeling for Nature and the Landscape of Man, Éd. Paul Hallberg, Gothenburg, Kungl. Vetenskaps & Vitterhets-Samhället, 1980, pp. 132–42
- (in French) Jean Roussel, "La Douleur de Saint-Preux", Éd. Carminella Biondi, Carmelina Imbroscio, Marie-Josée Latil, Nadia Minerva, Carla Pellandra, Adriana Sfragaro, Brigitte Soubeyran, Paola Vecchi, La Quête du bonheur et l'expression de la douleur dans la littérature et la pensée françaises. Genève, Droz, 1995, pp. 371–79
- (in French) Jean Roussel, "La Faute, le rachat et le romanesque dans La Nouvelle Héloïse", Travaux de Littérature, 1995; 8: 209–20
- (in French) Timothy Scanlan, "Perspectives on the Nuits d'amour in Rousseau's La Nouvelle Héloïse", AUMLA, Nov 1993, n° 80, pp. 93–79
- (in French) Norbert Sclippa, "L'Idéal politique et l'idée de Nation dans La Nouvelle Héloïse", Jean-Jacques Rousseau, politique et nation, Intro. Robert Thiéry, Paris, Champion, 2001, XXIV, pp. 101–08
- (in French) Norbert Sclippa, "La Nouvelle Héloïse et l'aristocratie", Studies on Voltaire and the Eighteenth Century, 1991, n° 284, pp. 1–71
- (in French) Norbert Sclippa, "La Nouvelle Héloïse, la noblesse et la bourgeoisie", Studies on Voltaire and the Eighteenth Century, 1989, n° 265, pp. 1617–19
- (in French) Jean-Paul Sermain, "La Nouvelle Héloïse ou l'invention du roman-poème"", Éd. Colette Piau-Gillot, Roland Desné, Tanguy L'Aminot, Modernité et pérennité de Jean-Jacques Rousseau, Paris, Champion, 2002, pp. 227–40
- (in French) Jean Sgard, "De Cunégonde à Julie", Recherches et Travaux, 1996, n° 51, pp. 121–30
- (in French) Lieve Spaas, "D'un Clarens à l'autre : structures du désir sexuel dans La Nouvelle Héloïse", Studies on Voltaire and the Eighteenth Century, 1991, n° 284, pp. 73–82
- (in French) Jean Starobinski, "Jean-Jacques Rousseau : Jours uniques, plaisirs redoublés", Thèmes et figures du siècle des Lumières : mélanges offerts à Roland Mortier, Éd. Raymond Trousson Michèle Mat-Hasquin, Jacques Lemaire, Ralph Heyndels, Genève, Droz, 1980, pp. 285–97
- (in French) Raymond Trousson, "De Jacques à Jean-Jacques ou du bon usage de La Nouvelle Héloïse", Éd. Elio Mosele, Intro. Pierre Brunel, George Sand et son temps, I–III. Slatkine, Genève, 1994, pp. 749–66
- (in French) Raymond Trousson, "Le Rôle de Wolmar dans La Nouvelle Héloïse", Éd. Raymond Trousson, Michèle Mat-Hasquin, Jacques Lemaire, Ralph Heyndels, Thèmes et figures du siècle des Lumières : mélanges offerts à Roland Mortier, Genève, Droz, 1980, pp. 299–306
- (in French) Philip Stewart, "Half-title or Julie beheaded." Romanic Review 86:1 (1995), pp. 30–44.
- Jacques Lemaire, Ralph Heyndels, Thèmes et figures du siècle des Lumières : mélanges offerts à Roland Mortier, Genève, Droz, 1980, pp. 299–306
- (in French) Joseph Waldauer, "La Solitude et la communauté dans La Nouvelle Héloïse", Studies on Voltaire and the Eighteenth Century, 1989, n° 265, pp. 1271–74
- Hans Wolpe, "Psychological Ambiguity in La Nouvelle Héloise", University of Toronto Quarterly, 1959, n° 28, pp. 279–90
