= Édouard Georges Mac-Avoy =

French painter

- Born: 25 January 1905; Caudéran, Gironde
- Died: 26 September 1991 (aged 86); Saint-Tropez, Var
- Occupation(s): Artist; Portraitist

Édouard Georges Mac-Avoy (born 25 January 1905 – 26 September 1991) was a French artist and portraitist.

== Biography ==
=== Studies ===
Mac-Avoy's family descended from an Irish Catholic family that emigrated to France in the 17th century . Through his mother, Hélène de Cazalet, he also descended from a family of Huguenots from the Cévennes.

Mac-Avoy studied in Switzerland where he received his baccalauréat. His artistic talent caused a brief hesitation between theatre and painting, but having chosen the latter, he entered the Académie Julian at the age of 18 and studied there with Paul Albert Laurens. In Paris, he frequented the house of Félix Vallotton and met Bonnard and Vuillard who showed an interest in his work.

=== Career ===
Mac-Avoy sold his first painting to the government when he was only 19 years old. It was exhibited at the Musée du Luxembourg. He then branched out into landscapes, urban scenes and portraits, before devoting himself almost exclusively to the latter genre. At the Salon des Tuileries, in 1936, he exhibited only portraits in a style so distinctive and discordant to current fashions that he was compared to a Philippe de Champaigne.

In 1939, he married Anne Coquebert de Neuville, with whom he had three children. When the Second World War broke out, he was mobilized and joined the 5th Division of Motorized Infantry. Mac-Avoy received the Croix de guerre 1939-1945 and his experience of war is said to have influenced his style.

Mac-Avoy made portraits of many writers, artists and politicians including André Gide, Pierre Larousse, Honegger, Mauriac, Picasso, de Gaulle, Béjart, and Johnny Hallyday and Arthur Rubinstein

A friend of Henry de Montherlant, he illustrated several of that writer's luxury editions including La relève du Matin in 1952, La Ville dont le prince est un enfant in 1961 and Les Garçons in 1973.

Mac-Avoy's Paris studio was located at 102, rue du Cherche-Midi, in the 6th arrondissement.

For a time he was a teacher at the Académie de la Grande Chaumière.

=== Prizes and distinctions ===
- 1963: Grand Prix des peintres témoins de leur temps
- Président du Salon d'automne de Paris (succeeds Yves Brayer)
- 1989: Prix Ève Delacroix
- Officier Ordre des Arts et des Lettres
- Officier of the Légion d'honneur

=== Students ===
- Marguerite Bermond.
- Diane Esmond

== Sources ==
=== Bibliography ===
- Edouard Mac'Avoy, Le plus clair de mon temps : 1926-1987, Paris, Ramsay, 1988 OCLC 18563064, Prix Ève Delacroix of the Académie française.
- Hackley Art Museum, Mac Avoy, Muskegon, Hackley Art Museum, 1985 OCLC 24623756
- Rodolphe Pailliez, Mac Avoy, Paris, Éditions de Nesle, 1979 OCLC 6305323
- Galerie Motte, Mac'Avoy, Geneva, Galerie Motte, 1958 OCLC 82122373
