= Diane Esmond =

French painter

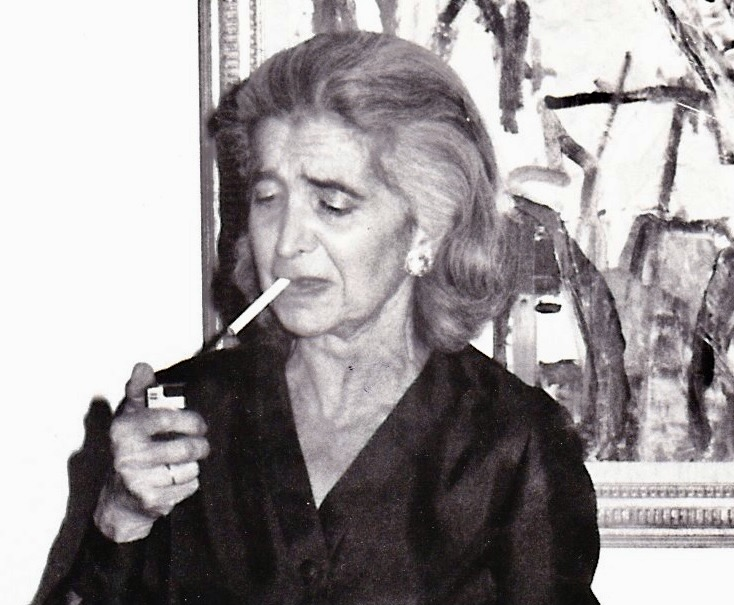
Diane Esmond, New York, 1973

Diane Esmond (16 April 1910 - 27 May 1981) was a French painter in the tradition of Post-Impressionism. Working mainly in or near Paris, she spent years during and after World War II in New York City. Her subjects included still lifes, cityscapes, and tropical forests. She also designed sets and costumes for theatrical productions.

== Life ==
Diane Esmond was born in London on 16 April 1910 and raised in Paris. Her parents were Edward Esmond (né Ezra), a native of British India descended from David Joseph Ezra, and Valentine née Deutsch de la Meurthe, who was French. She studied in the 1930s with the French artist Édouard Georges Mac-Avoy, and participated in group exhibitions in Paris in those years. Her paintings from that period were seized in 1941 by German occupying forces and removed to the Galerie Nationale du Jeu de Paume in Paris. Most of the seized works are listed as destroyed, although a few were rescued in 1944 after the liberation of Paris.

Diane Esmond lived in the United States between 1940 and the mid-1950s. She then returned to France, divorcing her husband Robert Wallis, whom she had married in 1937 and with whom she had two sons. She lived in or near Paris for the rest of her life. She married the cartoonist Jean Don in 1962.

Diane Esmond died in Paris on 27 May 1981.

== Work ==
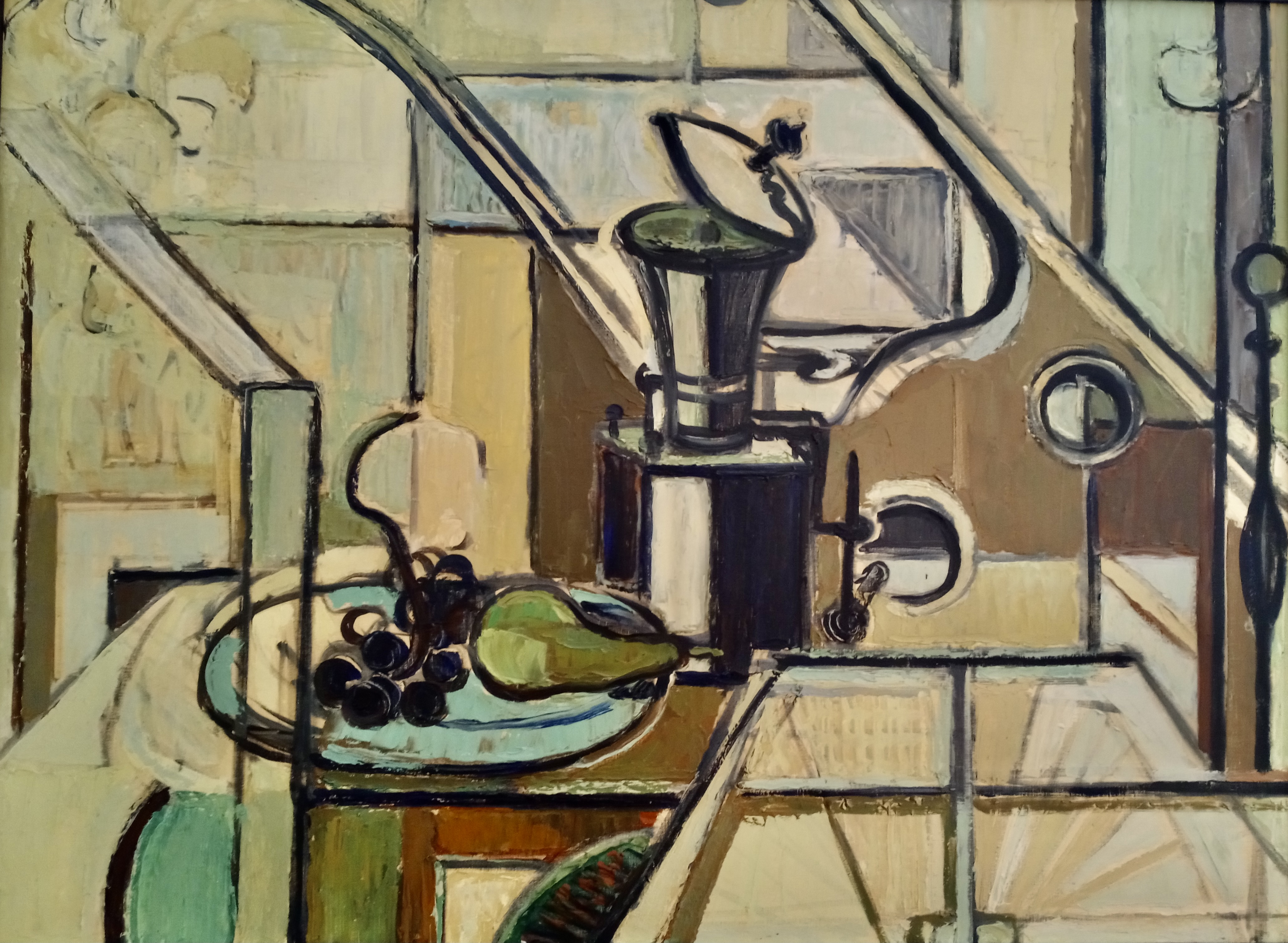
Still life, ca. 1960

Diane Esmond worked in the tradition of French impressionist and post-impressionist painters, including Cézanne, Gauguin, Matisse, Bonnard, and Braque. Her major subjects were landscapes and still lifes, although her subject matter extended also to scenes of barges on the Seine and of workingmen in cafés. In the 1950s her painting took a turn toward the dramatic, becoming more expressive and laying a greater emphasis on color. Her landscapes (oils, black-and-white ink drawings, and gouaches) were inspired by the French Provençal countryside and by the luxuriant vegetation of Caribbean tropical forests. At the culmination of her artistic career, she used luminous colors in semi-abstract compositions.

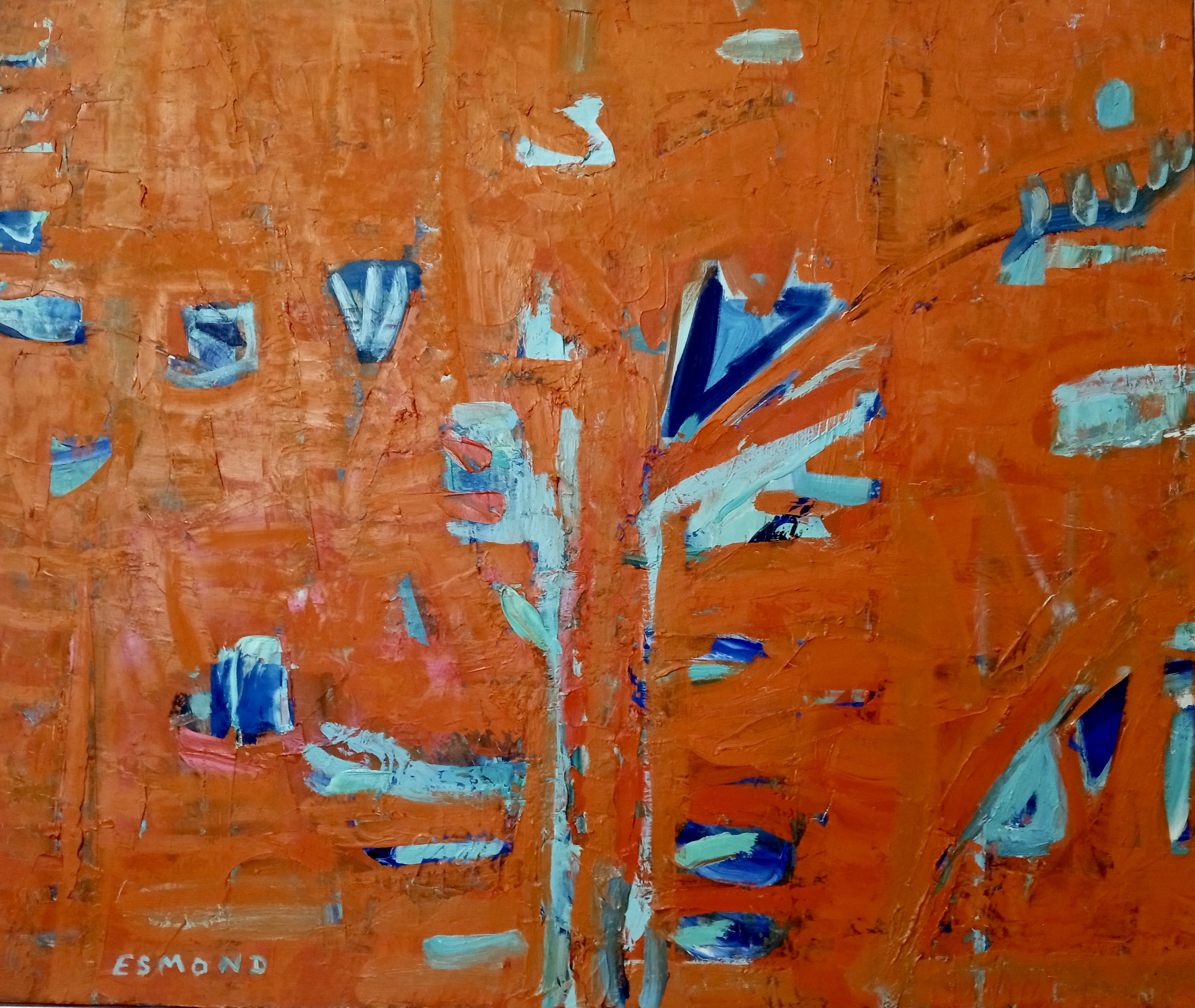
Abstract, ca. 1974

Diane Esmond also designed sets and costumes for performances of classic French theater, in collaboration with directors/actors Jean-Louis Barrault, Madeleine Renaud, and Marie Bell. In 1963 she designed the costumes and stage sets for a performance on Broadway of Jean Racine’s Bérénice, performed by the Marie Bell Company.

The group exhibitions in which she participated in Paris in the 1930s included the Salon of French Artists in 1936, the Salon d’Automne in 1935 and the Salon Indépendant National in 1938. From 1950 to 1978 she had solo showings of her paintings in Geneva, New York, Paris, and London, in galleries such as Carstairs, Chardin, Hammer, Knoedler, and Wildenstein.

== Bibliography and reviews of exhibitions ==
- Elks, Sonia, “National Trust’s Stately Home Clandon Park Gutted by Fire,” The London Times, April 30, 2015 (loss by fire of a work by Diane Esmond held by the British National Trust).
- Gaunt, William, “Diane Esmond at the Wildenstein,” The Times, July 27, 1978, p. 13 (solo exhibition at the Wildenstein, London).
- Laprade, Jacques de, “Le Salon national indépendant,” Beaux-arts, April 29, 1938: 4 (group exhibition).
- Lecuyer, Raymond, “Le Salon national indépendant a ouvert ses portes,” Le Figaro, April 25, 1938: 2 (group exhibition).
- P.B., “Diane Esmond,” Art Digest, March 15, 1953, Vol. 27:20 (solo exhibition at Carstairs, NYC).
- Poulin, Gaston, “Le Salon: la peinture de la Société des Artistes Français,” Comedia, April 30, 1935: 1 (group exhibition).
- Preston, Stuart, "Chiefly Modern: American Contemporaries, the Tried and True,” New York Times, March 8, 1953, Section X, p. 10 (solo exhibition at Carstairs, NYC).
- “Questions aux exposants du salon d’automne,” L’Amour de l’art, 1936: 373–4 (group exhibition).
- "Le Salon des artistes français,"Beaux-Arts (Paris), May 1, 1936: 8 (group exhibition).
- "Le Salon d'automne," Beaux-Arts (Paris), Nov. 1, 1935: 7 (group exhibition).
- “Le Salon des Tuileries,” Beaux-Arts, May 22, 1936: 5 (group exhibition).
- Roger-Marx, Claude, “Le Salon d’automne,” Le Jour, Oct. 31, 1935: 2 (group exhibition).
- R.D. "Autour des cimaises," L’Aube (Paris), November 29, 1950: 2 (solo exhibition at Galerie Chardin, Paris).
- R.V., “Reviews and Previews: Diane Esmond," Art News, March 1953, Vol. 52: 39 (solo exhibition at the Knoedler, NYC).
- R.V., “Diane Esmond,” Art News, March 1956, Vol. 55:64 (solo exhibition at Knoedler's, NYC).
- Saradin, Edouard, “Le Salon d’automne,” Journal des Débats, Nov. 17, 1935: 4 (group exhibition).
- Shepard, Richard, “Theater,” New York Times, Oct. 30, 1963: 46 (review of Bérénice on Broadway).
- Wright, Barbara, “London Reviews,” Arts Review, Vol 30 No. 12, June 1978: 311 (solo exhibition at the Wildenstein, London).

== Encyclopedia entries ==
- Benezit, "Diane Esmond," in Dictionary of Artists (Paris: Gründ, 2006), Vol. 5, p. 293.
- Bénézit, Emmanuel, "Diane Esmond," in Dictionnaire critique et documentaire des peintres, sculpteurs, dessinateurs et graveurs de tous les temps et de tous les pays par un groupe d'écrivains spécialistes franc̦ais et étrangers, new ed. Jacques Busse (Paris: Gründ, 1999), Vol. 5, p. 182.

== Theater records at the French National Archives ==
- Bérénice (Play) / directed by André Barsacq; tragedy in 5 acts by Jean Racine; sets and costumes by Diane Esmond; interpreted by the Marie Bell acting company; performed in Paris at the Théâtre du Gymnase, October 1, 1963. Notice n° FRBNF39466327.
- Les Choutes (Play) / directed by Jean Wall; sets by Diane Esmond; performed in Paris at the Théâtre des nouveautés, 1959. Notice n° FRBNF14678349; Identifier: ark:/12148/cb146783499

== Paintings confiscated during WWII ==
The online database of the Reichsleiter Rosenberg Taskforce lists 57 items stolen from the Esmond house in Paris that were kept at the Jeu de Paume Nazi sorting house. Of these, several are paintings by Diane Esmond slated for destruction, but some of these are illustrated with photographs. A few were recovered but the majority remain missing. Photographs taken in the 1940s can be viewed on the "ERR project" website:

| title | date | ERR record |
|---|---|---|
| Self-portrait with palette | 1935 | 50010 |
| Ballet before the performance | 1938 | 18367 |
| Still Life with Grapes | 1935 | 51359 |
| Green Landscape | 1936 | 51376 |
| Woman's portrait in a white blouse | 1936 | 51374 |
| Negro child | 1935 | 50009 |
| Portrait of a woman playing cards | 1936 | 18357 |
| Clown | 1936 | 18357 |
| Men in a Bar | 1937 | 18366 |
| Female nude from the back | 1935 | 18356 |
| Woman with monkey | 1935 | 51375 |
| Male nude from the back | 1935 | 18358 |
| Cabaret | 1940 | 51377 |

- Deprez, Guillaume, “Rose Valland: Art Historian Turned Spy to Save Art from Nazis,” The Collector, June 14, 2020.
- Heuss, Anja, Kunst und Kulturgutraub: eine vergleichende Studie zur Besatzungspolitik der Nationalsozialisten in Frankreich und in der Sowjetunion (Heidelberg: Universitätsverlag C. Winter, 2000), p. 122.
- Bundesarchiv, B323/853, in Koblenz, Germany: Cultural Plunder by the Einsatzstab Reichsleiter Rosenberg: Database of Art Objects at the Jeu de Paume.
- Masurovsky, Marc, “What happened to the collection of Edouard Esmond?”
