= Roger d'Amécourt =

French writer and publisher

Roger d'Amécourt is a French writer and publisher.

== Selected works ==
- 1987: Le Mariage de mademoiselle de La Verne : les avatars de la vertu, Prix Ève Delacroix 1988.
