= Étienne de Montety =

French writer and journalist

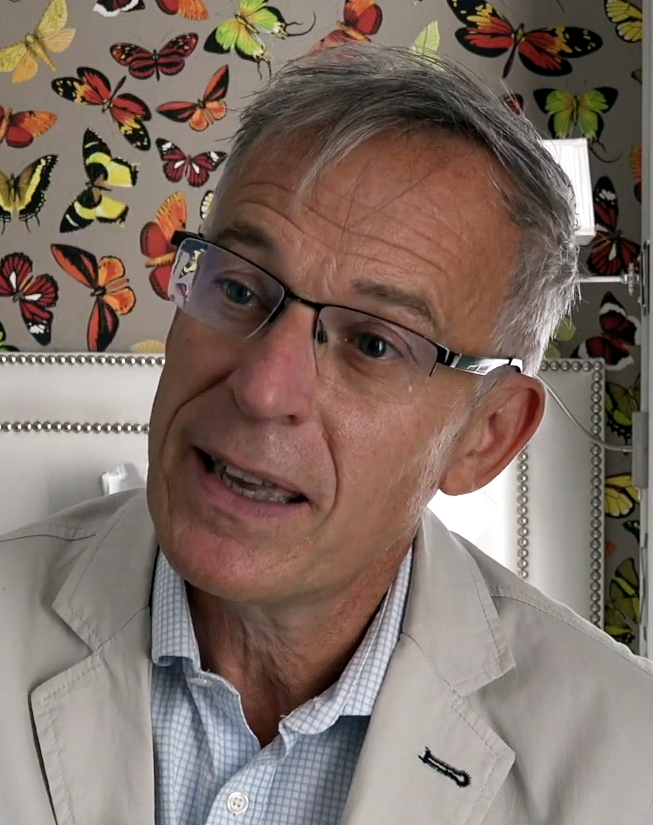
Étienne de Montety in 2020

Étienne de Montety (born 2 May 1965 in 15th arrondissement of Paris) is a French writer and journalist.

== Biography ==
Étienne de Montety studied at the University of Paris X-Nanterre, where he obtained a master's degree in law and political science and a postgraduate degree in political science. Deputy Editor-in-chief of Le Figaro and director of the Figaro littéraire (Supplement published on Thursday) since 2006, he led the pages "Debates Opinions" of the daily between 2008 and 2012. He runs a daily chronicle on the vocabulary entitled "Un Dernier mot".

== Works ==
- 1994: Thierry Maulnier, biography, Éditions Julliard
- 1996: Salut à Kléber Haedens, Éditions Grasset
- 2001: Honoré d'Estienne d'Orves, un héros français, Éditions Perrin – Prix littéraire de l'armée de terre - Erwan Bergot, 2001
- 2006: Des hommes irréguliers, Perrin
- 2009: L'Article de la mort, novel, Éditions Gallimard – Prix Ève Delacroix
- 2013: La Route du salut, novel, Gallimard – Prix des Deux Magots
- 2013: Encore un mot : billets du « Figaro », Points
- 2015: Un dernier mot : billets du Figaro, Points
- 2017: L'Amant noir, novel, Gallimard – Prix Jean-Freustié
- 2020: La grande épreuve, 2020, Stock – Grand prix du roman de l'Académie française
