= Morangis, Essonne =

Commune in Île-de-France, France

Morangis
- Commune
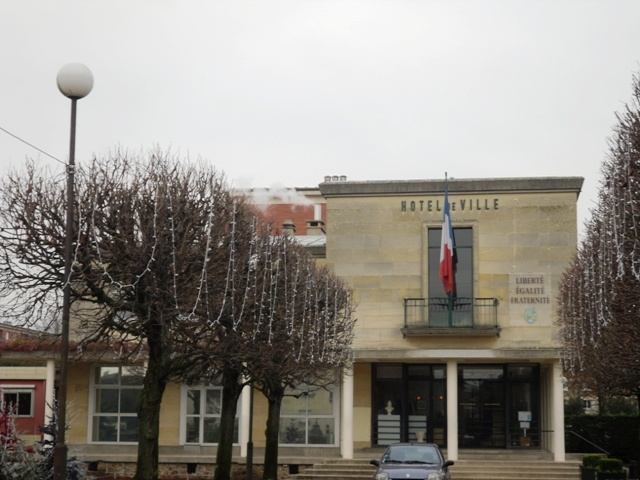
- The town hall in Morangis

- Coat of arms
- Location of Morangis
- Location within France Location within Île-de-France (region)
- Coordinates: 48°42′20″N 2°19′57″E
- Country: France
- Region: Île-de-France
- Department: Essonne
- Arrondissement: Palaiseau
- Canton: Savigny-sur-Orge
- Intercommunality: Grand Paris

Government
  - Mayor (2020–2026): Brigitte Vermillet
- Area^{1}: 4.80 km^{2} (1.85 sq mi)
- Highest elevation: 100 m (330 ft)
- Lowest elevation: 47 m (154 ft)
- Population (2023): 14,129
  - Density: 2,940/km^{2} (7,620/sq mi)
- Time zone: UTC+01:00 (CET)
  - Summer (DST): UTC+02:00 (CEST)
- INSEE/Postal code: 91432 /91420
- ^{1} French Land Register data, which excludes lakes, ponds, glaciers > 1 km^{2} (0.386 sq mi or 247 acres) and river estuaries.

Morangis (French: [mɔʁɑ̃ʒis]) is a commune in the Essonne department in the southern suburbs of Paris, France. It is located 18 kilometres from the center of Paris. A portion of Paris Orly Airport is in Morangis.

== Population ==
Inhabitants of Morangis are known as Morangissois in French.

Historical population
Year	Pop.	±% p.a.
1968	6,874	—
1975	8,492	+3.07%
1982	9,416	+1.49%
1990	10,043	+0.81%
1999	10,611	+0.61%
2007	11,511	+1.02%
2012	12,476	+1.62%
2017	13,729	+1.93%
2023	14,129	+0.48%
Source: INSEE

== Transport ==
The nearest train station is Chilly-Mazarin station on Paris RER line C. The A6 autoroute passes through the commune and Paris Orly Airport is nearby.

== Education ==
Public primary schools include:

- Ecole maternelle Les Acacias (preschool)
- Ecole maternelle Les Hirondelles (preschool)
- Ecole élémentaire Edouard Herriot
- Ecole élémentaire Louis Moreau
- Ecole primaire Nelson Mandela

There is a public junior high school, Collège Michel Vignaud; a public senior high school/sixth-form college, Lycée Marguerite Yourcenar; and a private school, Ecole privée Saint-Joseph.

== Twins cities ==
- Plaidt, in Germany
- Chard, Somerset, in England

== See also ==
- Communes of the Essonne department
