= Canton of Savigny-sur-Orge =

Coordinates: 48.68°N 2.35°E

The canton of Savigny-sur-Orge is an administrative division of the Essonne department, Île-de-France region, northern France. Its borders were modified at the French canton reorganisation which came into effect in March 2015. Its seat is in Savigny-sur-Orge.

It consists of the following communes:

1. Morangis
2. Savigny-sur-Orge
3. Wissous
