= Claude Kayat =

Franco-Swedish writer, dramatist and painter

Claude Kayat (born 24 July 1939, Sfax, Tunisia) is a Franco-Swedish writer, dramatist and painter. Since 1958, he lives in Stockholm, Sweden, where he completed his studies; He got married, had children, and worked as a teacher of French and English.

At the same time, he pursued a career as a novelist in French, a language he has always considered his mother tongue without ever having lived in the country.

In his writing Claude Kayat often explores concepts like identity. He has also written 28 plays in French and Swedish.

== Bibliography ==
- 1981: Mohammed Cohen, Éditions du Seuil, prix Afrique méditerranéenne 1982
- 1987: Les Cyprès de Tibériade, La Table Ronde, Grand prix du Rayonnement de la langue française
- 1989: Le Rêve d’Esther, La Table Ronde
- 1997: L'Armurier, Le Seuil, prix Ève Delacroix of the Académie française
- 2000: Hitler tout craché, L’Âge d’Homme
- 2002: Le Treizième Disciple, Éditions de Fallois
- 2007: La Synagogue de Sfax, Punctum
- 2012: Le Café de Mme Ben Djamil
- 2019: La Paria

== Exhibitions ==
- 2008: Galerie Paname, Stockholm
- 2009: Håfors Galerie
- 2009: Cosmopolitan Galleri, Göteborg
- 2010: Rönnells, Stockholm
- 2011: Chaikhana, Stockholm
