= Hôtel de Ville, Savigny-sur-Orge =

Town hall in Savigny-sur-Orge, France

Hôtel de Ville
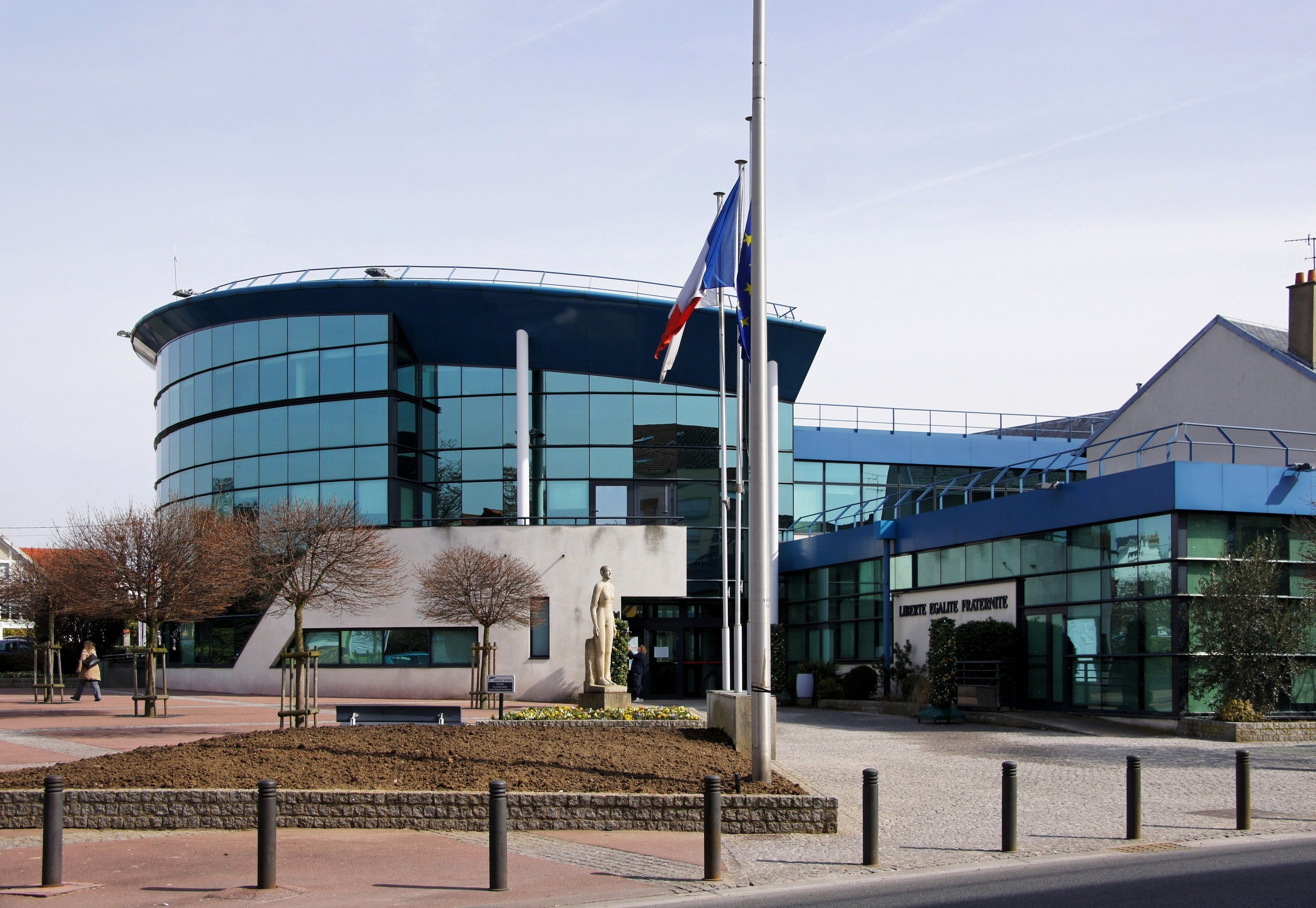
- The main frontage of the Hôtel de Ville in March 2010
- Interactive map of the Hôtel de Ville area

General information
- Type: City hall
- Architectural style: Modern style
- Location: Savigny-sur-Orge, France
- Coordinates: 48.6798°N 2.3455°E
- Completed: 1999

Design and construction
- Architects: Claude Liverato and Jean-Louis Chentrier

The Hôtel de Ville (French pronunciation: [otɛl də vil], City Hall) is a municipal building in Savigny-sur-Orge, Essonne, in the southern suburbs of Paris, standing on Avenue Charles de Gaulle.

== History ==
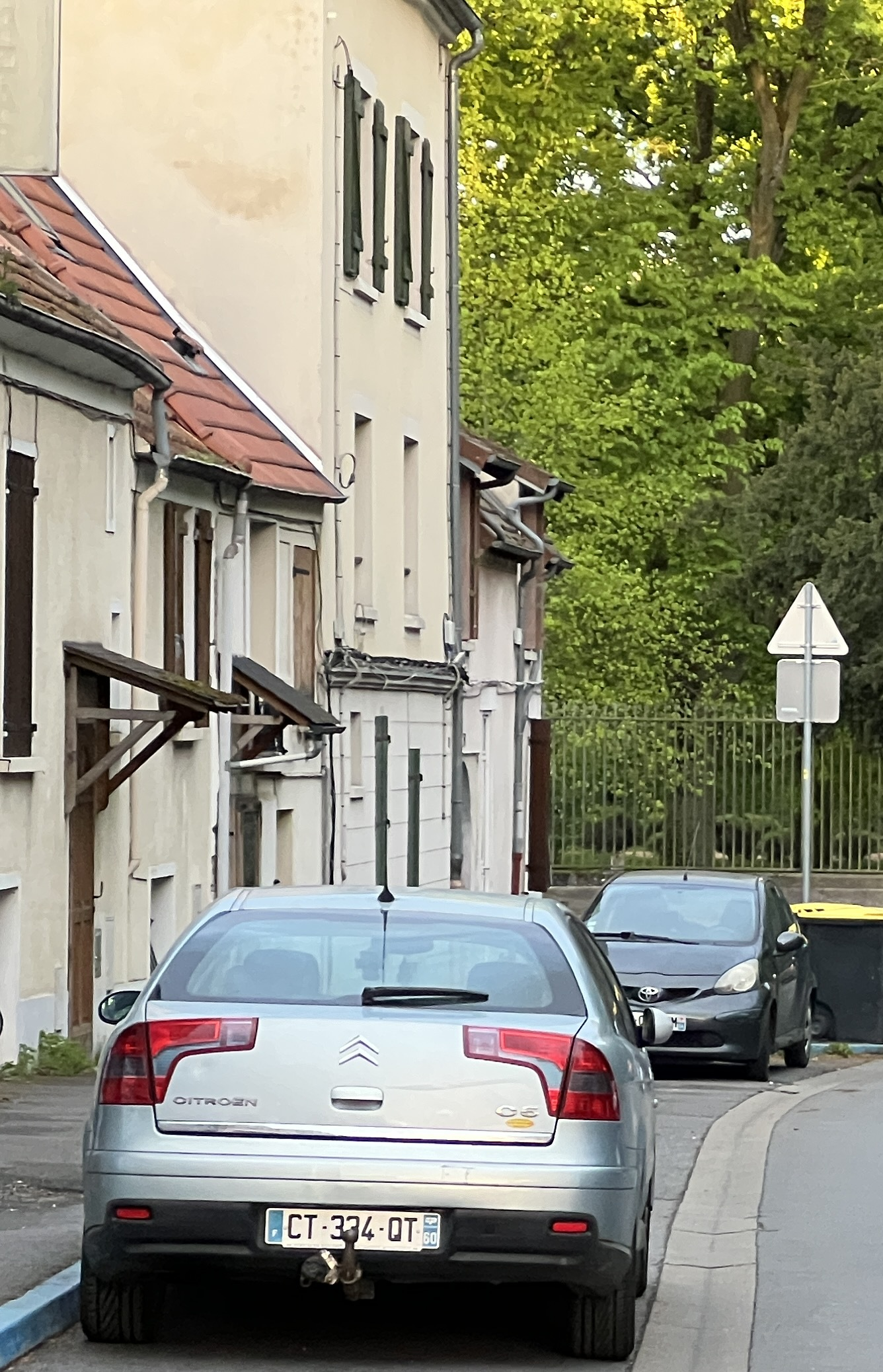
The first town hall (the last building on the left)

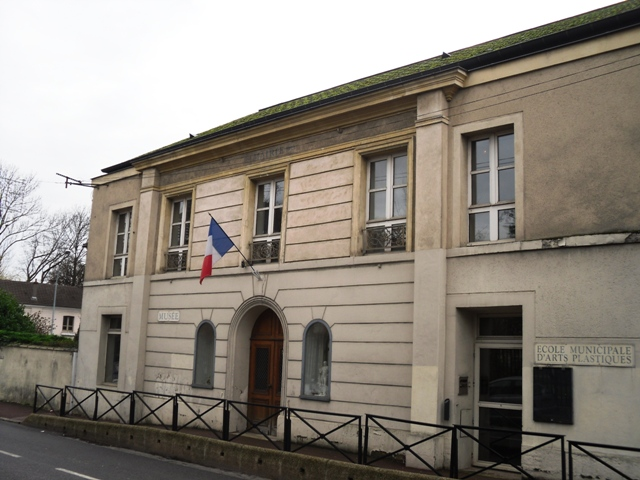
The second town hall (now the École Municipale d'Arts Plastiques)

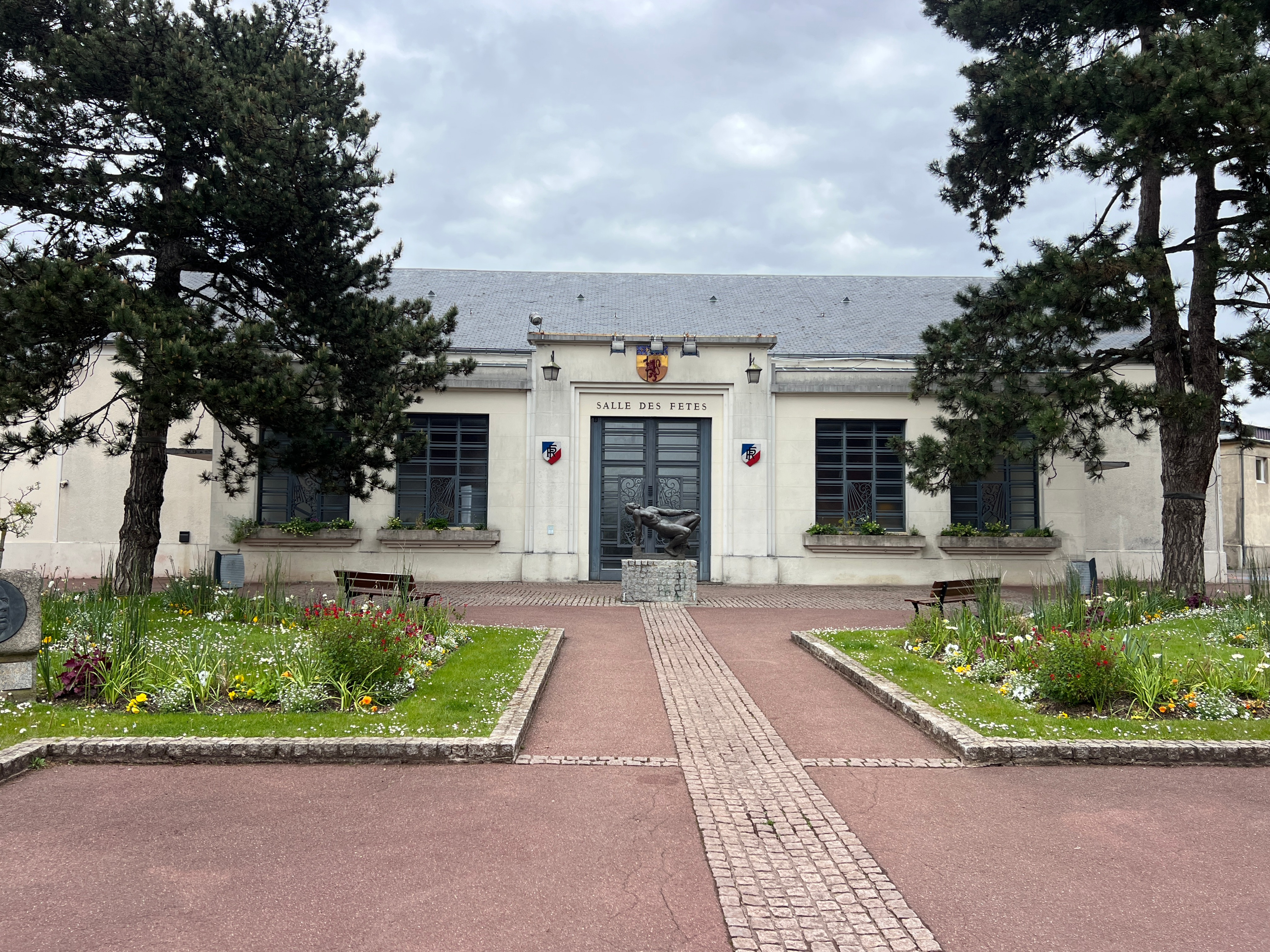
The Salle des Fêtes on Avenue Charles-de-Gaulle

The first municipal building was commissioned to accommodate the local school which had been established by the local priest, Nicolas Jolly, in the Church of Saint-Martin in 1728. The site selected was on the northeast side of Rue Vieille (now Rue Charles Rossignol). The new school building, which was a basic two-storey structure with an archway in the left-hand bay, was completed in January 1732. One of the rooms in the school was designated for municipal use in 1834. After ceasing to operate as a school, the building was converted for private residential use.

In 1846, after the first building became cramped, the local seigneur, Marshal Louis-Nicolas Davout, led an initiative to establish a new combined school and town hall. The building he selected was on the south side of Rue de l'Église. The building was converted to a design by Sieur Laforest in the neoclassical style, refaced in ashlar stone, and was officially opened in November 1848.

The design involved a symmetrical main frontage of five bays facing onto Rue de l'Église. The central section of three bays, which was rusticated on the ground floor, featured a round headed doorway with a archivolt and a keystone, flanked by a pair of round-headed windows with keystones. The central section was flanked by full-height pilasters and fenestrated by three casement windows with moulded surrounds and iron railings on the first floor. The left-hand end bay was fenestrated with casement windows on both floors, while the right-hand end bay contained a doorway on the ground floor and a casement window on the first floor. In 1883, after the school relocated to Avenue de la Gare (now Avenue Charles-de-Gaulle), the council converted the former classrooms in the building on Rue de l'Église for municipal purposes. After ceasing to operate as a municipal building, it became the École Municipale d'Arts Plastiques (the Municipal School of Plastic Arts).

In the late 1920's, the council acquired the Dorgère Farm on Avenue de la Gare (now Avenue Charles-de-Gaulle) and, in the 1930s, after erecting several new buildings there, collocated most of its administrative functions onto that site. The structures erected at that time included a single-storey building containing the Salle des Fêtes (ballroom) which faced onto Avenue de la Gare (now Avenue Charles-de-Gaulle). On 17 August 1944, during the Second World War, amidst rising tensions as the allied armies swept across France, the German troops who had occupied the Salle des Fêtes set it alight. This was just seven days before the liberation of the town on 24 August 1944.

In the mid-1990s, following significant population growth, the town council led by the mayor, Jean Marsaudon, decided to refurbish the 1930s buildings and to erect a new administrative building to the northwest of the Salle des Fêtes. The new building was designed by Claude Liverato and Jean-Louis Chentrier in the modern style, built in concrete and glass and was completed in 1999. The design involved a semi-circular structure clad in plate glass.

The Musée Davout (Davout Museum) was established in a small building in front and to the right of the Salle des Fêtes in 2008. Exhibits put on display included a bust of Davout, and a painting depicting the Battle of Jena–Auerstedt on 14 October 1806, when the 28,000 men of the French III Corps, commanded by Davout, defeated a Prussian formation of 60,000 troops.

During the Nahel Merzouk riots, on 27 June 2023, the town hall was attacked, doors were broken and there was fire damage to the entrance hall.
