= Prix Ève Delacroix =

Le prix Ève-Delacroix is one of the prizes bestowed by the Académie française. The award which was established in 1977 by the Ève-Delacroix foundation is intended "for the author of a work (essay or novel) combining literary qualities with the meaning of the dignity of man and the responsibilities of the writer".

== Laureates ==
- 2016 - Gilles Thomas, Les Catacombes. Histoire du Paris souterrain
- 2014 - Marcel Cohen, Sur la scène intérieure. Faits
- 2013 - Michèle Audin, Une vie brève
- 2012 - Ali Magoudi, Un sujet français and Gang Peng, Artiste du peuple (silver medal)
- 2011 - Michel Meulders, William James (silver medal) and Olivia Rosenthal, Que font les rennes après Noël ?
- 2010 - Étienne de Montety, L’Article de la mort (silver medal) and Eugène Green, La Bataille de Roncevaux
- 2009 - Stéphane Hoffmann, Des garçons qui tremblent and Arnaud Teyssier, Charles Péguy. Une humanité française (silver medal)
- 2008 - Sara Yalda, Regard persan,
- 2007 - Eugène Ébodé, Silikani (silver medal) and Jacqueline Risset, Traduction et mémoire poétique
- 2006 - Jean-Paul Sermain, Le Conte de fées du classicisme aux Lumières
- 2005 - Roger Kempf, L’indiscrétion des frères Goncourt
- 2004 - Jacqueline Duchêne, Place Royale
- 2003 - André Burgos, Les cours d’adultes de Pierre Sacreste, instituteur de la IIIe République (silver medal) and Jean-Paul Mulot, Le Prince qui voulait être jardinier, Charles-Joseph de Ligne
- 2002 - Julie Wolkenstein, Colloque sentimental
- 2001 - Marcel Schneider, Les Gardiens du secret
- 2000 - Roger Bichelberger, Celle qui gardait toute chose en son cœur and Véronique Gély-Ghédira, La Nostalgie du moi (silver medal)
- 1999 - Marcel Gauchet, La Religion dans la démocratie. Parcours de la laïcité and Abdallah Laroui, Islam et Histoire
- 1998 - Maurice Herzog, L’Autre Annapurna
- 1997 - Claude Kayat, L’Armurier and Claude Pichois, Auguste Poulet-Malassis, l’éditeur de Baudelaire (silber medal)
- 1996 - Philippe Le Guillou, Livres des guerriers d’or and Robert Rousse, Lumière sur la voie (bronze medal)
- 1995 - Hélène Guisan-Démétriadès, La Tierce présence
- 1994 - Jean Schmitt, Mes dix mille plus belles années
- 1993 - Patrick Erouart-Siad, Océanie
- 1992 - Christian Combaz, Bal dans la maison du pendu, and all his work as novelist
- 1991 - Hugues de Montalembert, À perte de vue
- 1990 - Jean-Marc Varaut, Poètes en prison
- 1989 - Édouard Georges Mac-Avoy, Le plus clair de mon temps
- 1988 - Roger d'Amécourt, Le mariage de Mademoiselle de la Verne
- 1987 - Philippe Seringe, Les symboles dans l’art, dans les religions et dans la vie de tous les jours
- 1986 - Michel Breitman, Le témoin de poussière
- 1985 - Roger Chapelain-Midy, Comme le sable entre les doigts
- 1984 - Louis Nucéra, Le kiosque à musique
- 1983 - Paul Savatier, Le Photographe
- 1982 - Georges Suffert, Un royaume pour une tombe
- 1981 - not attributed
- 1980 - Florence Delay, L’Insuccès de la fête
- 1979 - Philippe Beaussant, Le Biographe
- 1978 - Jean Lods, La part de l’eau
- 1977 - Yves Bertho, Ingrid
- 1960 - Jean Lartéguy, Les Centurions
