= Mohamed Siad =

Mohamed Siad may refer to:

- Mohamed Siad Barre, Somali military dictator and President of the Somali Democratic Republic from 1969 to 1991
- Mohammed Said Hersi Morgan, son-in-law of Siad Barre and minister of defense of Somalia
- Mohamed Siad, alleged Toronto drug dealer involved in Toronto Mayor Rob Ford's video scandal
- Yusuf Mohammed Siad, Somali warlord, Islamist and former minister
