= Patrick Erouart-Siad =

French writer (born 1955)

Patrick Erouart-Siad, real name Patrick Erouart (born 16 January 1955, Savigny-sur-Orge) is a French writer.

== Biography ==
Born of a French father and a Somali mother of Djibouti, he spent his early years in Djibouti, then returned to France in the Paris region, spent two years in Madagascar and four years in Senegal before traveling around the world.

He was a resident of the Villa Médicis from 1989 to 1991, and has been living in New York city since 1996.

He works with director Jacques Sarasin on a DVD and a film about Joseph Stiglitz. He has collaborated with magazines Géo, Corto Maltese, Actuel, Cent idées, Vogue, l'Écho des savanes, etc.

He was a journalist and proofreader for Libération (1979–1984).

== Works ==
- 1965: Cahier de poésies
- 1985: Afrique du Sud : « Blanc honoraire », Ramsay
- 1987: Cahiers de la Mort-Colibri, novel, Éditions du Seuil
- 1988: East Africa with Tim beddow
- 1992: Océanie, prix Ève Delacroix of the Académie française.
- 1995: La Guinée-Bissau aujourd'hui, 2nd ed.
- 1997: Le fleuve Powhatan, novel, Flammarion
- 1991: Djibouti with Patrick Frilet
- 2002: Une Enfance Outremer under the direction of Leilla Sebbar, Points Seuil
- 2001: Autour de Nicolas Bouvier, Éditions Zoé
- 2006: L'appel du Bronx with father Pierre Raphaël
- 2007: Maroc

== Articles ==
- 2006: Chroniques in "French Morning" online magazine de New York
- 2005–2004: Articles for EchoPolyglot.com
- 2004: Guide de New York National Geographic Magazine de NYU
- 2004: Black Renaissance The Great Wall
- 2002: Special issue on New York by Geo
- 2002: Report in Somaliland with illustrations by the author

== Television ==
- 1994: 52 minutes documentary, Sauvé des eaux, a hydroelectric dam in the Guyanese forest o fPetit Saut, prod. Gedeon
