= Jean-Paul Sermain =

French academic

Jean-Paul Sermain is a French academic teaching at the University of Paris III: Sorbonne Nouvelle. A specialist of the eighteenth century, his research concerns the 18th-century French literature, the poetics of the novel and fairy tales. He also leads studies on works by Marivaux, Prévost and Diderot.

== Bibliography ==
- 1999: Le Singe de don Quichotte : Marivaux, Cervantes et le roman postcritique, Oxford : Voltaire Foundation
- 2002: Métafictions 1670-1730. La réflexivité dans la littérature, Paris, Éditions Honoré Champion
- 1985: Rhétorique et roman au dix-huitième siècle : l’exemple de Prévost et de Marivaux (1728–1742), Oxford, Voltaire Foundation at the Taylor Institution
- 2005: Le conte de fées du classicisme aux lumières, Paris, Desjonquères, ISBN 2843210763, Prix Ève Delacroix.
- 2009: Les Mille et une nuits entre Orient et Occident, Paris, Desjonquères
